= Rissa Municipality =

Former municipality in Sør-Trøndelag, Norway

Rissa Municipality Rissa kommune
- Former municipality
- Rissen herred (historic name)
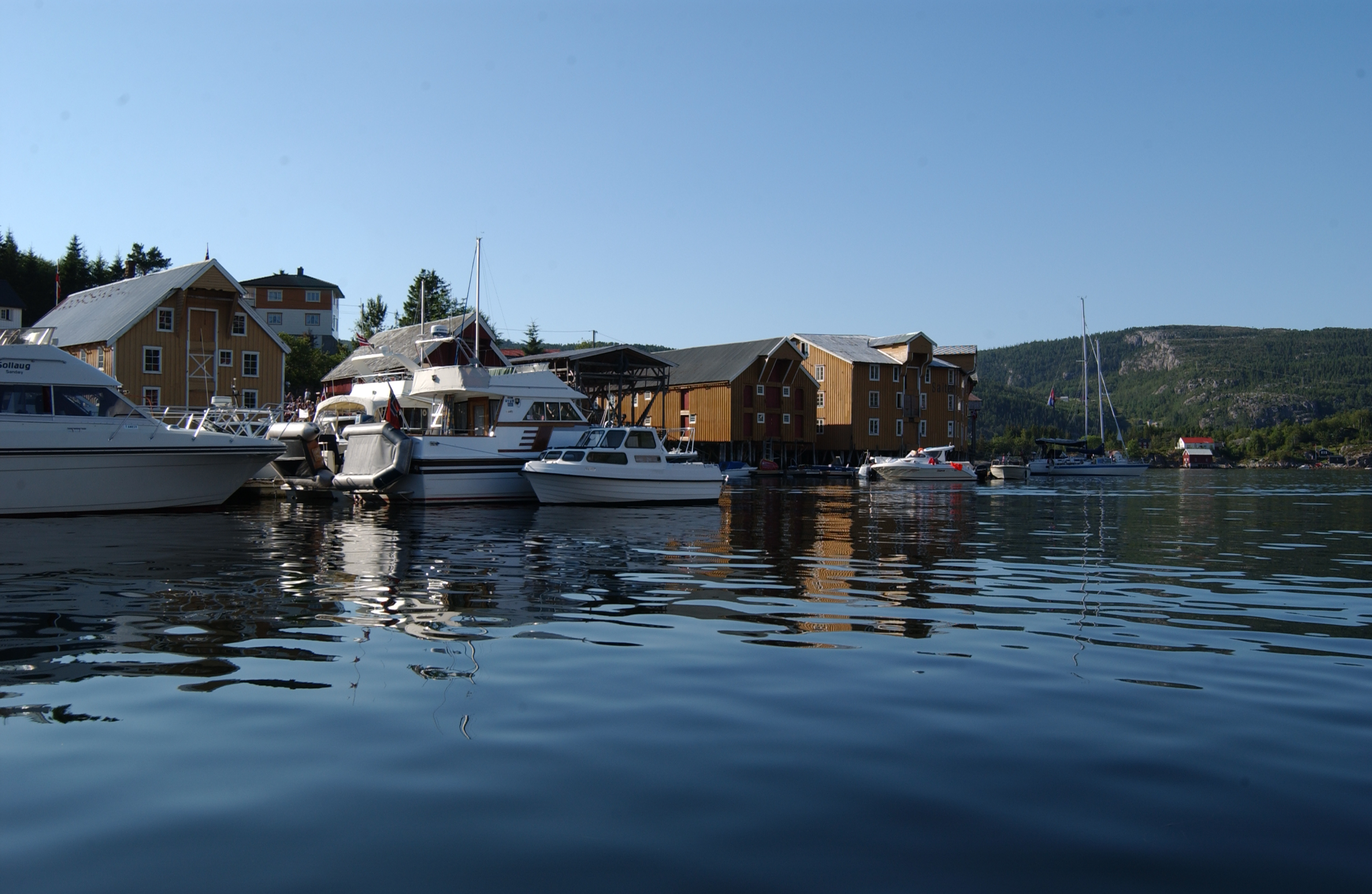
- View of the harbour at Råkvåg

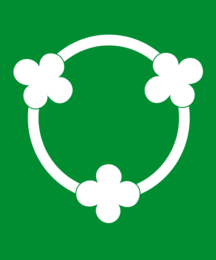
- Flag Coat of arms

- Sør-Trøndelag within Norway

- Rissa within Sør-Trøndelag
- Coordinates: 63°39′20″N 10°02′23″E
- Country: Norway
- County: Sør-Trøndelag
- District: Fosen
- Established: 1860
  - Preceded by: Stadsbygd Municipality
- Disestablished: 1 Jan 2018
  - Succeeded by: Indre Fosen Municipality
- Administrative centre: Årnset

Government
  - Mayor (2017-2017): Liv Darell (Sp)

Area (upon dissolution)
  - Total: 621.37 km^{2} (239.91 sq mi)
  - Land: 587.85 km^{2} (226.97 sq mi)
  - Water: 33.52 km^{2} (12.94 sq mi) 5.4%
  - Rank: #179 in Norway
- Highest elevation: 623 m (2,044 ft)

Population (2017)
  - Total: 6,628
  - Rank: #158 in Norway
  - Density: 10.7/km^{2} (28/sq mi)
  - Change (10 years): ▲ +4.1%
- Demonym: Rissværing

Official language
  - Norwegian form: Neutral
- Time zone: UTC+01:00 (CET)
  - Summer (DST): UTC+02:00 (CEST)
- ISO 3166 code: NO-1624

Rissa is a former municipality in the old Sør-Trøndelag county in Norway in the Fosen region. The municipality existed from 1860 until its dissolution on 1 January 2018 when it became part of the newly created Indre Fosen Municipality in Trøndelag county. The administrative centre of the municipality was the village of Årnset. Other villages in the municipality included Askjem, Hasselvika, Husbysjøen, Rørvika, Råkvåg, Sørfjorden, and Stadsbygd.

Prior to its dissolution in 2018, the 621-square-kilometre (240 sq mi) municipality was the 179th largest by area out of the then 426 municipalities in Norway. Rissa Municipality was the 158th most populous municipality in Norway with a population of 6,628. The municipality's population density was 11.3 inhabitants per square kilometre (29/sq mi) and its population had increased by 4.1% over the last decade.

== General information ==
=== Municipal history ===
The former municipality of Rissen was established in 1860 when it was separated from the large Stadsbygd Municipality. Initially, Rissen Municipality had 3,733 residents. The spelling of the name was later changed to Rissa Municipality. On 1 January 1905, the southwestern district of the municipality (population: 1,019) on the west side of the Trondheimsfjord was separated to form the new Lensvik Municipality. This left Rissa Municipality with 3,394 residents. During the 1960s, there were many municipal mergers across Norway due to the work of the Schei Committee. On 1 January 1964, most of Stadsbygd Municipality (except for the Ingdalen area) and the southern part of Stjørna Municipality were merged with Rissa to form a new, larger Rissa Municipality.

On 1 January 2018, Rissa Municipality and its neighbor Leksvik Municipality were merged to form the newly created Indre Fosen Municipality which became part of the new Trøndelag county on the same date.

=== Toponymy ===
The municipality (originally the parish) was historically named "Rissen", or more recently spelled "Rissa" (Old Norse: Rissi). This was probably the old name of the brackish basin of Botn (literally "the bottom" of the fjord). Even though this is a heavily land-locked fjord with a river-like inlet from the Trondheimsfjord (it was probably a shallow bay in prehistoric times). The name is probably derived from the verb rísa which means "raise" or "rise". (The average water level of Botnen is today about 1.7 metres (5 ft 7 in) above mean sea level and the surface water is almost fresh from accumulated internal runoff.) Historically, the name of the municipality was spelled Rissen. On 3 November 1917, a royal resolution changed the spelling of the name of the municipality to Rissa.

=== Coat of arms ===
The coat of arms was granted on 23 January 1987 and it was in use until 1 January 2018 when the municipality was dissolved. The official blazon is "Vert, a chaplet of three quatrefoils argent" (Norwegian: I grønt en sølv rosekrans). This means the arms have a green field (background) and the charge is a chaplet (crown) with three quatrefoils. The charge has a tincture of argent which means it is commonly colored white, but if it is made out of metal, then silver is used. The crown design was chosen to symbolize a similar crown of Skule Bårdsson that is depicted on an old tombstone at the Nidaros Cathedral. Bårdsson was the founder of Rein kloster at the Rein estate (which he also owned) in Rissa. The crown is a typical headdress used by the medieval Norwegian dukes. Typically, there are five quatrefoils on a crown like this, but Rissa has only three to symbolize the three municipalities that were merged in 1964 to form Rissa (Rissa, Stadsbygd, and Stjørna). The arms were designed by Oscar Bergsaune. The municipal flag has the same design as the coat of arms.

== Geography ==
The municipality was located on the southern end of the Fosen peninsula along the Trondheimsfjord and the Stjørnfjord. The large lake Storvatnet was located on the eastern border with Leksvik Municipality. To the north was Åfjord Municipality, to the east was Bjugn Municipality. Ørland Municipality was located to the northwest, and Leksvik Municipality was to the east. The highest point in the municipality was the 623-metre (2,044 ft) tall mountain Ytter Skurvhatten. The Flakk–Rørvik Ferry crosses the Trondheimsfjord connecting the village of Rørvika with the city of Trondheim.

=== Landslide ===
On 29 April 1978, a major quick-clay landslide occurred south of Rissa at 63.55624°N 9.9446978°E. An area of 330,000 m^{2} (3,600,000 sq ft), 6,000,000 m^{3} (7,800,000 yd^{3}) of quick clay slid down into the shores of Botn. The landslip caused a tsunami to strike the north shore at Leira, which destroyed a saw mill and flooded several houses. Out of the 40 people who were in the area at the time of the slide, one person died. A large portion of the slide was recorded on film by two amateur photographers. Almost four years after the event, a new road and stabilisation work in the area had removed most traces of the slide. The area being returned to agricultural use.

== Governance ==
While it existed, Rissa Municipality was responsible for primary education (through 10th grade), outpatient health services, senior citizen services, welfare and other social services, zoning, economic development, and municipal roads and utilities. The municipality was governed by a municipal council of directly elected representatives. The mayor was indirectly elected by a vote of the municipal council. The municipality was under the jurisdiction of the Frostating Court of Appeal.

Rissa joined the inter-municipal waste management agency Fosen Renovasjon when it was created in 1997. It had its head office in Årnset.

=== Municipal council ===
The municipal council (Kommunestyre) of Rissa Municipality was made up of 23 representatives that are elected to four year terms. The tables below show the historical composition of the council by political party.

Rissa kommunestyre 2015–2017
Party name (in Norwegian)	Number of representatives
Labour Party (Arbeiderpartiet)	5
Progress Party (Fremskrittspartiet)	1
Green Party (Miljøpartiet De Grønne)	1
Conservative Party (Høyre)	7
Christian Democratic Party (Kristelig Folkeparti)	1
Pensioners' Party (Pensjonistpartiet)	2
Centre Party (Senterpartiet)	4
Socialist Left Party (Sosialistisk Venstreparti)	1
Liberal Party (Venstre)	1
Total number of members:	23
Note: On 1 January 2018, Rissa Municipality became part of Indre Fosen Municipality.

Rissa kommunestyre 2011–2015
Party name (in Norwegian)	Number of representatives
Labour Party (Arbeiderpartiet)	5
Progress Party (Fremskrittspartiet)	2
Conservative Party (Høyre)	8
Christian Democratic Party (Kristelig Folkeparti)	1
Pensioners' Party (Pensjonistpartiet)	1
Centre Party (Senterpartiet)	4
Socialist Left Party (Sosialistisk Venstreparti)	1
Liberal Party (Venstre)	1
Total number of members:	23

Rissa kommunestyre 2007–2011
Party name (in Norwegian)	Number of representatives
Labour Party (Arbeiderpartiet)	11
Progress Party (Fremskrittspartiet)	2
Conservative Party (Høyre)	2
Christian Democratic Party (Kristelig Folkeparti)	2
Pensioners' Party (Pensjonistpartiet)	1
Centre Party (Senterpartiet)	6
Socialist Left Party (Sosialistisk Venstreparti)	2
Liberal Party (Venstre)	1
Total number of members:	27

Rissa kommunestyre 2003–2007
Party name (in Norwegian)	Number of representatives
Labour Party (Arbeiderpartiet)	10
Progress Party (Fremskrittspartiet)	2
Conservative Party (Høyre)	2
Christian Democratic Party (Kristelig Folkeparti)	2
Centre Party (Senterpartiet)	7
Socialist Left Party (Sosialistisk Venstreparti)	3
Liberal Party (Venstre)	1
Total number of members:	27

Rissa kommunestyre 1999–2003
Party name (in Norwegian)	Number of representatives
Labour Party (Arbeiderpartiet)	15
Progress Party (Fremskrittspartiet)	1
Conservative Party (Høyre)	4
Christian Democratic Party (Kristelig Folkeparti)	4
Centre Party (Senterpartiet)	9
Socialist Left Party (Sosialistisk Venstreparti)	2
Liberal Party (Venstre)	2
Total number of members:	37

Rissa kommunestyre 1995–1999
Party name (in Norwegian)	Number of representatives
Labour Party (Arbeiderpartiet)	12
Progress Party (Fremskrittspartiet)	1
Conservative Party (Høyre)	3
Christian Democratic Party (Kristelig Folkeparti)	4
Centre Party (Senterpartiet)	13
Socialist Left Party (Sosialistisk Venstreparti)	2
Liberal Party (Venstre)	2
Total number of members:	37

Rissa kommunestyre 1991–1995
Party name (in Norwegian)	Number of representatives
Labour Party (Arbeiderpartiet)	10
Conservative Party (Høyre)	4
Christian Democratic Party (Kristelig Folkeparti)	4
Centre Party (Senterpartiet)	13
Socialist Left Party (Sosialistisk Venstreparti)	5
Liberal Party (Venstre)	1
Total number of members:	37

Rissa kommunestyre 1987–1991
Party name (in Norwegian)	Number of representatives
Labour Party (Arbeiderpartiet)	13
Progress Party (Fremskrittspartiet)	1
Conservative Party (Høyre)	5
Christian Democratic Party (Kristelig Folkeparti)	4
Centre Party (Senterpartiet)	10
Socialist Left Party (Sosialistisk Venstreparti)	2
Liberal Party (Venstre)	2
Total number of members:	37

Rissa kommunestyre 1983–1987
Party name (in Norwegian)	Number of representatives
Labour Party (Arbeiderpartiet)	13
Conservative Party (Høyre)	6
Christian Democratic Party (Kristelig Folkeparti)	5
Centre Party (Senterpartiet)	9
Socialist Left Party (Sosialistisk Venstreparti)	1
Liberal Party (Venstre)	2
Local list for South-Stjørna (Bygdeliste for Sør-Stjørna)	1
Total number of members:	37

Rissa kommunestyre 1979–1983
Party name (in Norwegian)	Number of representatives
Labour Party (Arbeiderpartiet)	12
Conservative Party (Høyre)	6
Christian Democratic Party (Kristelig Folkeparti)	5
Centre Party (Senterpartiet)	9
Socialist Left Party (Sosialistisk Venstreparti)	1
Liberal Party (Venstre)	1
Local list for South-Stjørna (Bygdeliste for Sør-Stjørna)	3
Total number of members:	37

Rissa kommunestyre 1975–1979
Party name (in Norwegian)	Number of representatives
Labour Party (Arbeiderpartiet)	10
Conservative Party (Høyre)	3
Christian Democratic Party (Kristelig Folkeparti)	6
New People's Party (Nye Folkepartiet)	1
Centre Party (Senterpartiet)	12
Socialist Left Party (Sosialistisk Venstreparti)	1
Liberal Party (Venstre)	1
Local list for South-Stjørna (Bygdeliste for Sør-Stjørna)	3
Total number of members:	37

Rissa kommunestyre 1979–1975
Party name (in Norwegian)	Number of representatives
Labour Party (Arbeiderpartiet)	13
Conservative Party (Høyre)	3
Christian Democratic Party (Kristelig Folkeparti)	5
Centre Party (Senterpartiet)	11
Socialist People's Party (Sosialistisk Folkeparti)	1
Liberal Party (Venstre)	4
Total number of members:	37

Rissa kommunestyre 1967–1971
Party name (in Norwegian)	Number of representatives
Labour Party (Arbeiderpartiet)	12
Conservative Party (Høyre)	4
Christian Democratic Party (Kristelig Folkeparti)	5
Centre Party (Senterpartiet)	9
Socialist People's Party (Sosialistisk Folkeparti)	1
Liberal Party (Venstre)	6
Total number of members:	37

Rissa kommunestyre 1963–1967
Party name (in Norwegian)	Number of representatives
Labour Party (Arbeiderpartiet)	14
Conservative Party (Høyre)	3
Christian Democratic Party (Kristelig Folkeparti)	6
Centre Party (Senterpartiet)	10
Liberal Party (Venstre)	4
Total number of members:	37

Rissa herredsstyre 1959–1963
Party name (in Norwegian)	Number of representatives
Labour Party (Arbeiderpartiet)	5
Conservative Party (Høyre)	1
Christian Democratic Party (Kristelig Folkeparti)	3
Centre Party (Senterpartiet)	6
Liberal Party (Venstre)	3
Local List(s) (Lokale lister)	3
Total number of members:	21

Rissa herredsstyre 1955–1959
Party name (in Norwegian)	Number of representatives
Labour Party (Arbeiderpartiet)	6
Conservative Party (Høyre)	1
Christian Democratic Party (Kristelig Folkeparti)	3
Farmers' Party (Bondepartiet)	6
Liberal Party (Venstre)	3
Local List(s) (Lokale lister)	2
Total number of members:	21

Rissa herredsstyre 1951–1955
Party name (in Norwegian)	Number of representatives
Labour Party (Arbeiderpartiet)	6
Conservative Party (Høyre)	2
Christian Democratic Party (Kristelig Folkeparti)	2
Farmers' Party (Bondepartiet)	5
Liberal Party (Venstre)	4
Local List(s) (Lokale lister)	1
Total number of members:	20

Rissa herredsstyre 1947–1951
Party name (in Norwegian)	Number of representatives
Labour Party (Arbeiderpartiet)	5
Christian Democratic Party (Kristelig Folkeparti)	3
Farmers' Party (Bondepartiet)	4
Liberal Party (Venstre)	5
Local List(s) (Lokale lister)	3
Total number of members:	20

Rissa herredsstyre 1945–1947
Party name (in Norwegian)	Number of representatives
Labour Party (Arbeiderpartiet)	5
Communist Party (Kommunistiske Parti)	1
Christian Democratic Party (Kristelig Folkeparti)	2
Farmers' Party (Bondepartiet)	4
Liberal Party (Venstre)	5
Local List(s) (Lokale lister)	3
Total number of members:	20

Rissa herredsstyre 1937–1941*
Party name (in Norwegian)	Number of representatives
Labour Party (Arbeiderpartiet)	3
Conservative Party (Høyre)	1
Farmers' Party (Bondepartiet)	6
Liberal Party (Venstre)	6
Local List(s) (Lokale lister)	4
Total number of members:	20
Note: Due to the German occupation of Norway during World War II, no elections were held for new municipal councils until after the war ended in 1945.

=== Mayors ===
The mayor (Norwegian: ordfører) of Rissa Municipality was the political leader of the municipality and the chairperson of the municipal council. Here is a list of people who held this position:

- 1860–1863: Henrik Horneman
- 1864–1865: Svend Busch Schmidt
- 1866–1869: Eiler Hagerup Nannestad
- 1870–1873: Svend Busch Schmidt
- 1874–1875: Thomas Horneman
- 1876–1881: Ebbe Bakøen
- 1882–1895: Torger Halten (V)
- 1896–1897: Ole H. Rokseth (H)
- 1898–1898: Torger Halten (V)
- 1899–1902: Fredrik Horneman (H)
- 1903–1904: Ole H. Rokseth (H)
- 1905–1907: Bernt Johannes Ræder (V)
- 1908–1910: Andreas H. Berg (V)
- 1911–1916: Bernt Johannes Ræder (V)
- 1917–1919: Johan A. Dybdahl (V)
- 1920–1922: Elias Aalmo (V)
- 1923–1925: Peter L. Kimo (Bp)
- 1926–1928: Elias Aalmo (V)
- 1929–1931: Peter L. Kimo (Bp)
- 1932–1934: Gustav J. Krognes (Bp)
- 1935–1941: Peter L. Kimo (Bp)
- 1942–1945: Martin Aalmo (NS)
- 1945–1945: Peter L. Kimo (Bp)
- 1946–1947: Martin Skaug (V)
- 1948–1954: Henrik O. Grenne (Bp)
- 1955–1955: Petter Åsarød (V)
- 1956–1959: Marentzius Selven (LL)
- 1960–1967: Andreas Fallin (Sp)
- 1968–1971: Arne Holten (V)
- 1972–1979: Magnar Indseth (Sp)
- 1980–1985: Johan Arnt Sannan (H)
- 1986–1991: Olav Lindgaard (Sp)
- 1992–1995: Ivar Dybdahl (Sp)
- 1995–1998: Astrid Rathe (V)
- 1998–2011: Per Skjærvik (V)
- 2011–2017: Ove Vollan (H)
- 2017–2017: Liv Darell (Sp)

== Economy ==
=== Fosen Yards ===
One major employer in Rissa is Fosen Yard AS. Opened in 1972 as Fosen Mekaniske Verksteder, it has built a number of vessels used in Norway and abroad:

- MV Blue Puttees - ferry with Marine Atlantic
- MV Highlanders - ferry with Marine Atlantic
- MV Leif Ericson - ferry with Marine Atlantic

The company was originally Frengen Slip and Motorverksted (c. 1918) located in Fevåg and moved to Fosen by Jens Petter Bye who acquired Frengen Slip and Motorverksted in 1962.

== Culture ==
=== Churches ===
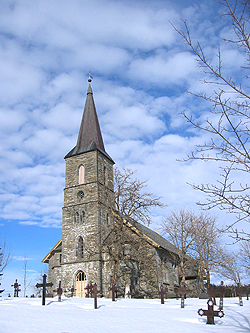
Rissa Church was built in the 19th century for the Church of Norway.

The Church of Norway had four parishes (sokn) within Rissa Municipality. It was part of the Fosen prosti (deanery) in the Diocese of Nidaros.

Churches in Rissa Municipality
Parish (sokn)	Church name	Location of the church	Year built
Hasselvika	Hasselvika Church	Hasselvika	1951
Rissa	Rissa Church	Leira	1888
Rissa	Rein Church	Reinsgrenda	1932
Stadsbygd	Stadsbygd Church	Stadsbygd	1842
Sør-Stjørna	Ramsvik Church	Råkvåg	1909
Sør-Stjørna	Frengen Church	Frengen	1972

== See also ==
- List of former municipalities of Norway
