= Rissa =

Rissa may refer to:

== Animals ==
- Rissa (bird), genus of birds known as kittiwakes
- Rissa brevirostris, also known as the red-legged kittiwake
- Rissa tridactyla, also known as the black-legged kittiwake

== People ==
- Rissa (artist) (born 1938), German artist and wife of Karl Otto Götz

== Places ==
- Rissa Municipality, a former municipality in the old Sør-Trøndelag county, Norway
- Rissa, also known as Årnset, a village in Indre Fosen Municipality in Trøndelag county, Norway
- Rissa Church, a church in Leira in Indre Fosen Municipality in Trøndelag county, Norway

== Other ==
- SS Rissa, a Finnish merchant ship in service 1955-61
- Rissa IL, a Norwegian sports club from Rissa, Norway
