= Leira, Trøndelag =

Village in Indre Fosen Municipality, Norway

Leira
- Village
- Interactive map of Leira
- Location within Trøndelag Location within Norway
- Coordinates: 63.6000°N 10.0007°E
- Country: Norway
- Region: Central Norway
- County: Trøndelag
- District: Fosen
- Municipality: Indre Fosen
- Elevation: 11 m (36 ft)
- Time zone: UTC+01:00 (CET)
  - Summer (DST): UTC+02:00 (CEST)
- Post Code: 7100 Rissa

Leira is a village in Indre Fosen Municipality in Trøndelag county, Norway. It is located about 1.5 kilometres (0.93 mi) north of the village of Årnset, along the north shore of the lake Botn. It is about 7 kilometres (4.3 mi) west of the lake Storvatnet. Rissa Church is located on the south side of Leira.

== Name ==
The name is derived from the Old Norse word leira which means "clay" or "muddy shore". Leira is a common name of rivers in many places in Norway.
