= Vanvikan =

Village in Indre Fosen Municipality, Norway

- Village
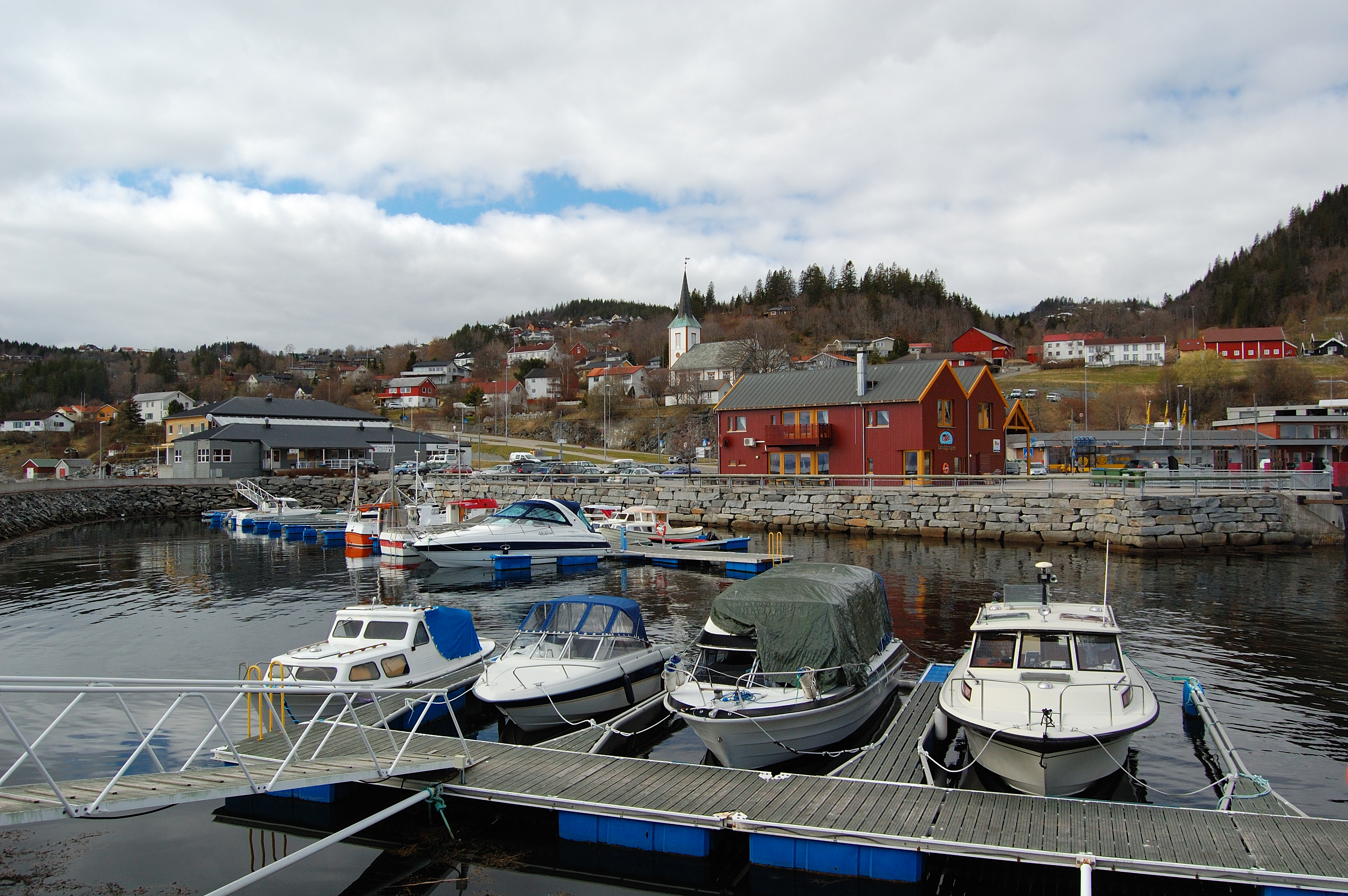
- View of the village
- Interactive map of Vanvikan
- Location within Trøndelag Location within Norway
- Coordinates: 63.5534°N 10.2215°E
- Country: Norway
- Region: Central Norway
- County: Trøndelag
- District: Fosen
- Municipality: Indre Fosen

Area
  - Total: 0.58 km^{2} (0.22 sq mi)
- Elevation: 4 m (13 ft)

Population (2024)
  - Total: 742
  - Density: 1,279/km^{2} (3,310/sq mi)
- Time zone: UTC+01:00 (CET)
  - Summer (DST): UTC+02:00 (CEST)
- Post Code: 7125 Vanvikan

Vanvikan is a village in Indre Fosen Municipality in Trøndelag county, Norway. It is located along the Trondheimsfjord in the southeastern part of the municipality. The village of Seter lies about 10 kilometres (6.2 mi) northeast of Vanvikan and the lake Storvatnet lies about 4 kilometres (2.5 mi) north of the village. One of the schools in the municipality, Vanvikan Skole is located in the village of Vanvikan. Stranda Church is also located in the village.

The 0.58-square-kilometre (140-acre) village has a population (2024) of 742 and a population density of 1,279 inhabitants per square kilometre (3,310/sq mi).

The village is an industrial centre with the various technology industries that are part of Lyng Industrier. Vanvikan is connected to the city of Trondheim by means of a fast passenger boat route across the Trondheimsfjord. The Flakk–Rørvik Ferry (car ferry) is accessed at Rørvika about 7 kilometres (4.3 mi) to the southwest. The Norwegian County Road 755 connects it with other villages to the northeast.
