= Staværing =

Staværing is a demonym in Norwegian, that may refer to:

- Someone from Stadsbygd
- Someone from Stavern
