= Stranda Church (Leksvik) =

Church in Trøndelag, Norway

- Stranda kirke
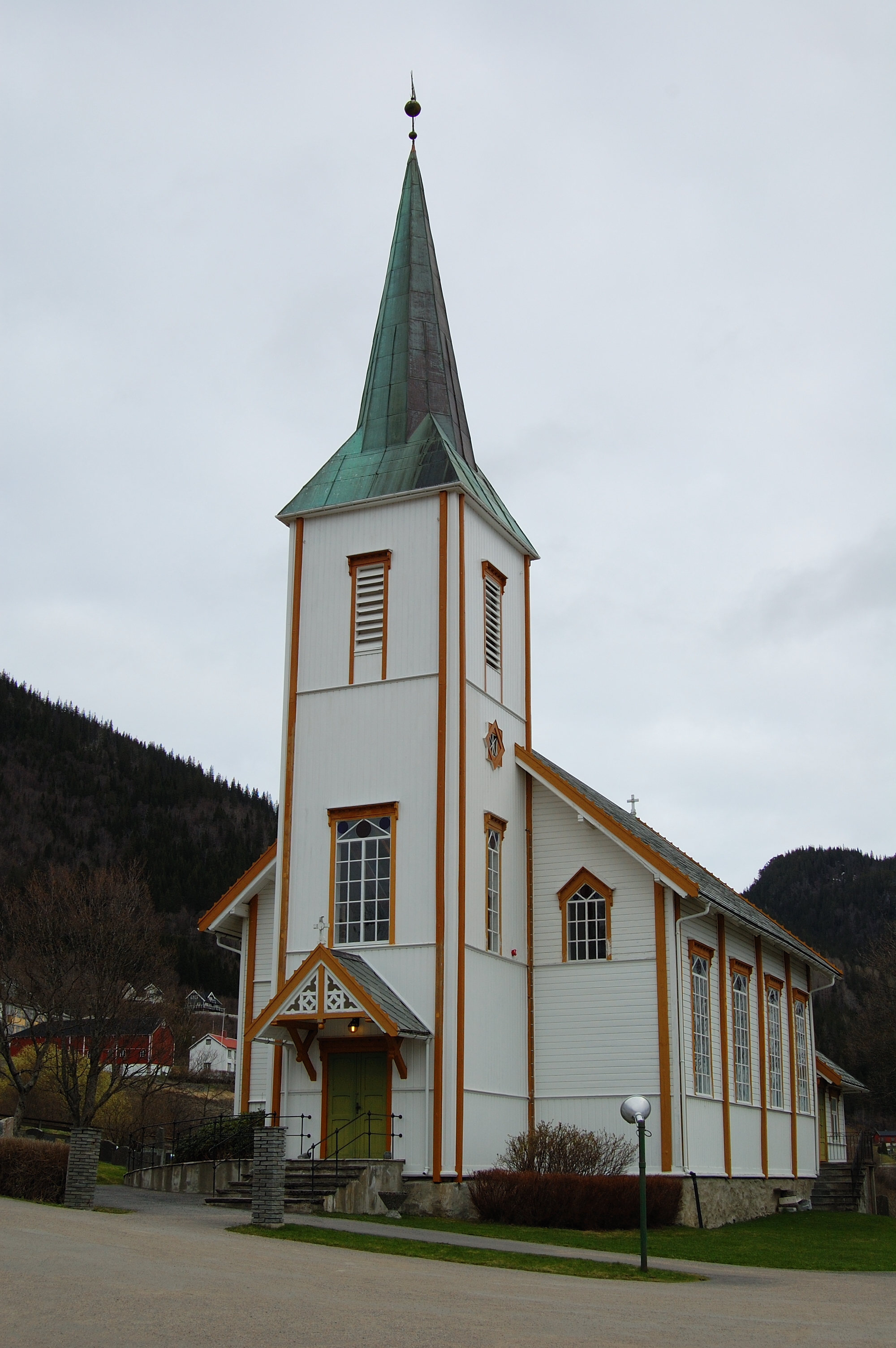
- View of the church
- Stranda Church
- 63.55355067°N 10.22040858°E
- Location: Indre Fosen Municipality, Trøndelag
- Country: Norway
- Denomination: Church of Norway
- Churchmanship: Evangelical Lutheran

History
- Former name: Hindrum kirke
- Status: Parish church
- Founded: 13th century
- Consecrated: 4 May 1897
- Events: Church site moved (1897)

Architecture
- Functional status: Active
- Architect: Knut Guttormsen
- Architectural type: Long church
- Completed: 1897 (129 years ago)

Specifications
- Materials: Wood

Administration
- Diocese: Nidaros bispedømme
- Deanery: Fosen prosti
- Parish: Stranda
- Norwegian Cultural Heritage Site
- Type: Church
- Status: Listed
- ID: 85596

Stranda Church (Norwegian: Stranda kirke) is a parish church of the Church of Norway in Indre Fosen Municipality in Trøndelag county, Norway. It is located in the village of Vanvikan, on the shore of the Trondheimsfjorden. It is the church for the Stranda parish which is part of the Fosen prosti (deanery) in the Diocese of Nidaros. The white, wooden church was built in a long church style in 1897 using plans drawn up by the architect Knut Guttormsen. The church, which seats about 300 people, was consecrated on 4 May 1897.

== History ==
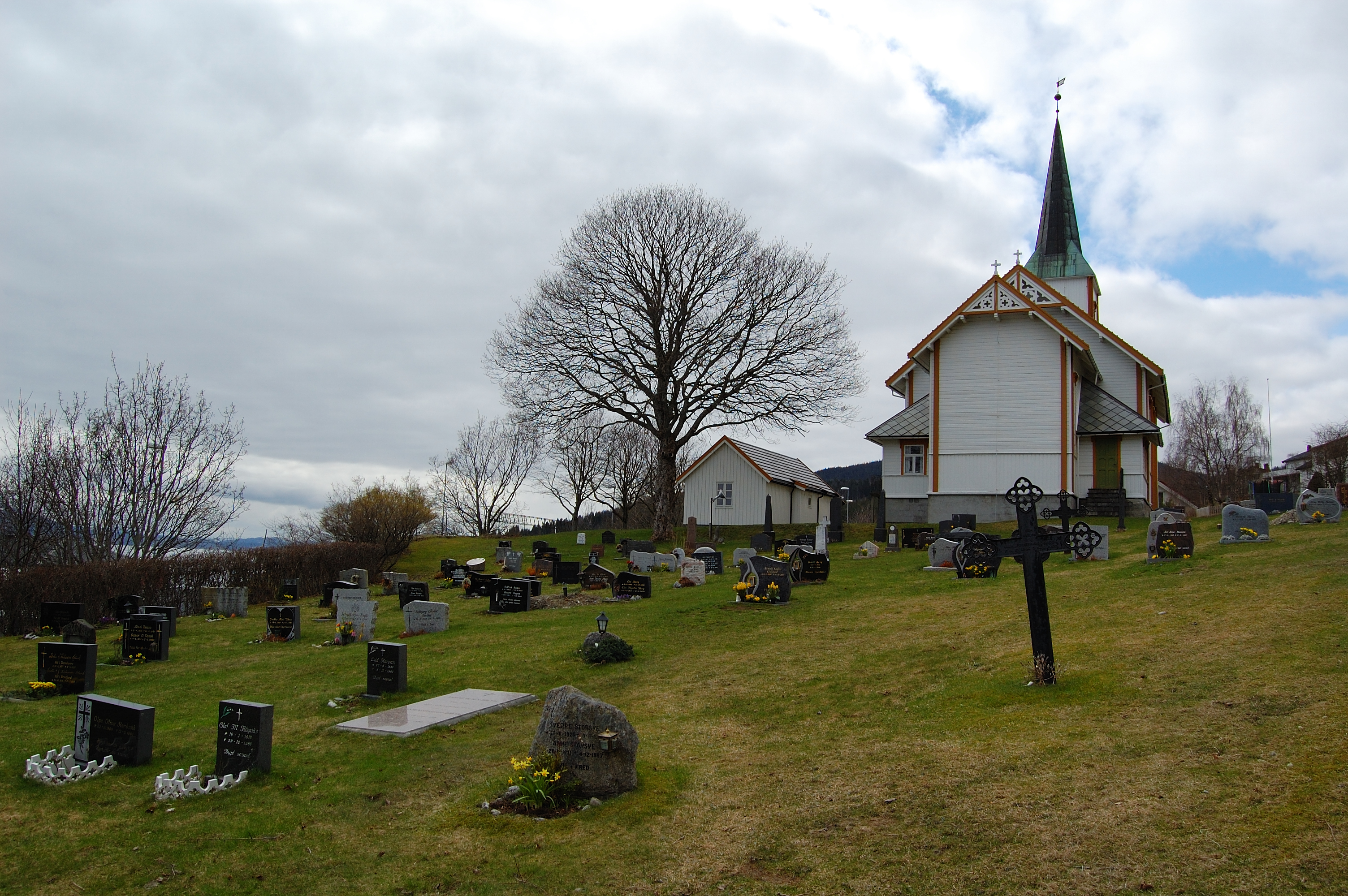
Churchyard surrounding the church

The earliest existing historical records of the church date back to the year 1589, but the old stave church was not new that year. Originally, the church was located at Hindrum, near the present-day village of Seter, about 12 kilometres (7.5 mi) northeast of the present site of the church. The church was likely built during the 1200s. The old church at Hindrum was used for centuries. In the mid-1600s, the old church was rebuilt in stages. In 1648, the old choir was torn down and completely rebuilt with new lumber by the architect Ole Jonsen Hindrum. Several years later, the old nave was torn down and rebuilt with new lumber as well. There is a metal spire on top of the tower on the roof with the date 1653, so that is possibly the year that the rest of the church was rebuilt. After it was rebuilt it was described as a small, timber-framed long church.

In 1897, it was decided to move the church from Hindrum to Vanvikan so it would be closer to where most of the parish's residents lived. A new church was built in Vanvikan and it was re-named Stranda Church. The new church was designed by K. Guttormsen and it was consecrated on 4 May 1897. The old church was torn down in December 1897.

In January 2010, a group of local residents began construction on a new stave church at the old church site of Hindrem. The little new church was designed very similarly to the Haltdalen Stave Church. The new stave church at Hindrem was consecrated on 9 September 2012. It sits adjacent to the centuries-old church cemetery.

== See also ==
- List of churches in Nidaros
