= Seter, Indre Fosen =

Village in Indre Fosen Municipality, Norway

Seter
- Village
- Interactive map of Seter
- Location within Trøndelag Location within Norway
- Coordinates: 63.5731°N 10.4021°E
- Country: Norway
- Region: Central Norway
- County: Trøndelag
- District: Fosen
- Municipality: Indre Fosen
- Elevation: 43 m (141 ft)
- Time zone: UTC+01:00 (CET)
  - Summer (DST): UTC+02:00 (CEST)
- Post Code: 7125 Vanvikan

Seter is a village located along the Trondheimsfjord in Indre Fosen Municipality in Trøndelag county, Norway. The Norwegian County Road 755 connects it to the village of Vanvikan to the southwest and to the villages of Leksvik and Dalbygda to the northeast.
