= Indre Fosen Municipality =

Municipality in Trøndelag, Norway

Indre Fosen Municipality Indre Fosen kommune
- Municipality
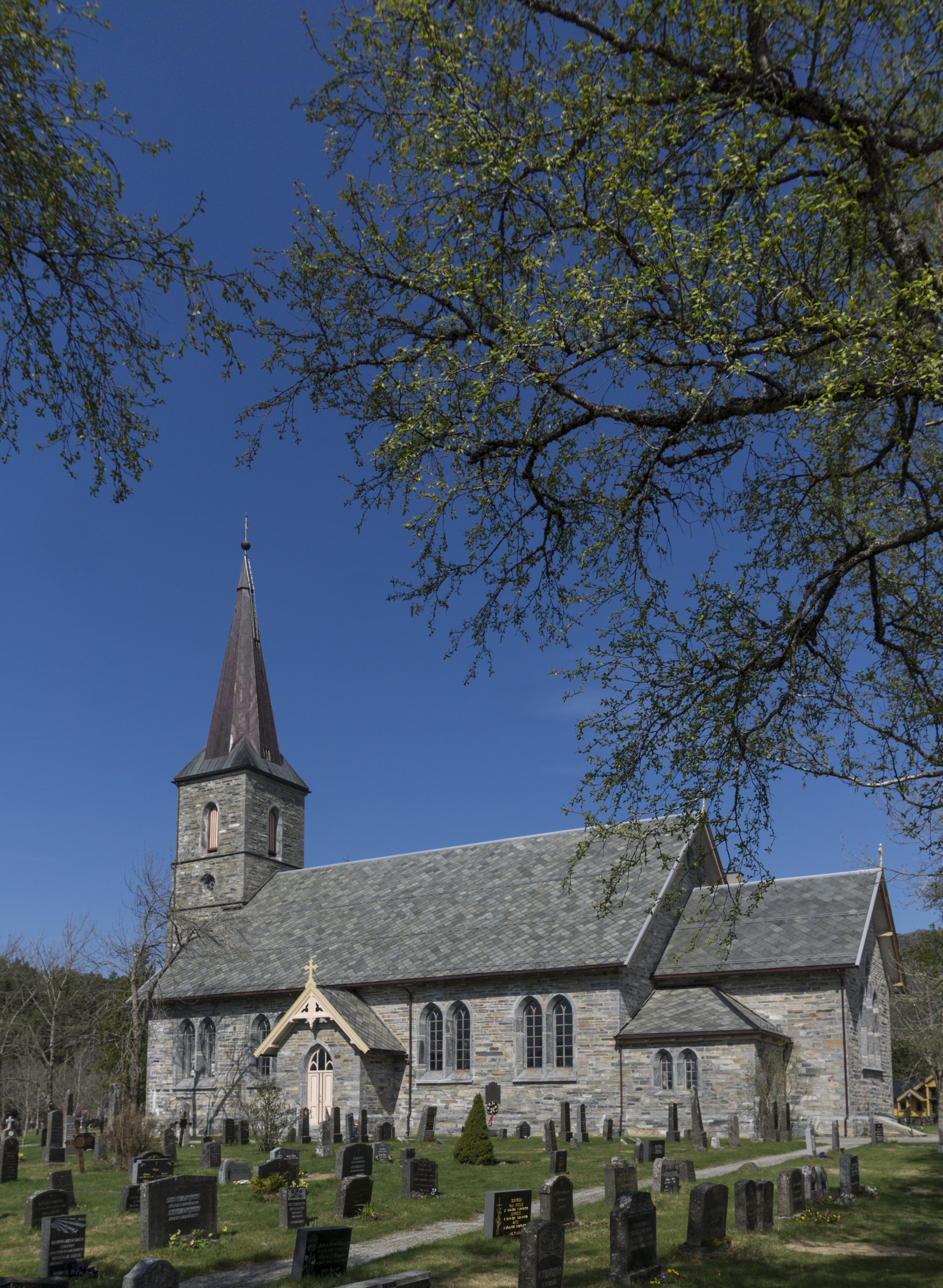
- View of the Rissa Church

- Flag Coat of arms

- Trøndelag within Norway

- Indre Fosen within Trøndelag
- Coordinates: 63.64382°N 10.18707°E
- Country: Norway
- County: Trøndelag
- District: Fosen
- Established: 1 Jan 2018
  - Preceded by: Rissa Municipality and Leksvik Municipality
- Administrative centre: Årnset

Government
  - Mayor (2023): Oskar Småvik (H)

Area
  - Total: 1,095.97 km^{2} (423.16 sq mi)
  - Land: 1,030.41 km^{2} (397.84 sq mi)
  - Water: 65.56 km^{2} (25.31 sq mi) 6%
  - Rank: #102 in Norway
- Highest elevation: 622.5 m (2,042 ft)

Population (2024)
  - Total: 10,023
  - Rank: #113 in Norway
  - Density: 9.1/km^{2} (24/sq mi)
  - Change (10 years): ▼ −1.7%
- Demonym: Indre Fosning

Official language
  - Norwegian form: Neutral
- Time zone: UTC+01:00 (CET)
  - Summer (DST): UTC+02:00 (CEST)
- ISO 3166 code: NO-5054
- Website: Official website

Indre Fosen is a municipality in Trøndelag county, Norway. It is located in the traditional district of Fosen. The administrative centre of the municipality is the village of Årnset. Other villages in Indre Fosen include Askjem, Dalbygda, Hasselvika, Husbysjøen, Leira, Leksvik, Råkvåg, Rørvika, Seter, Stadsbygd, Sørfjorden, Verrabotn, and Vanvikan. The Norwegian County Road 755 runs through the municipality.

The 1,096-square-kilometre (423 sq mi) municipality is the 102nd largest by area out of the 357 municipalities in Norway. Indre Fosen Municipality is the 113th most populous municipality in Norway with a population of 10,023. The municipality's population density is 9.1 inhabitants per square kilometre (24/sq mi) and its population has decreased by 1.7% over the previous 10-year period.

Economy: in January 2024, a shipyard that employed 132, went bankrupt.

== General information ==
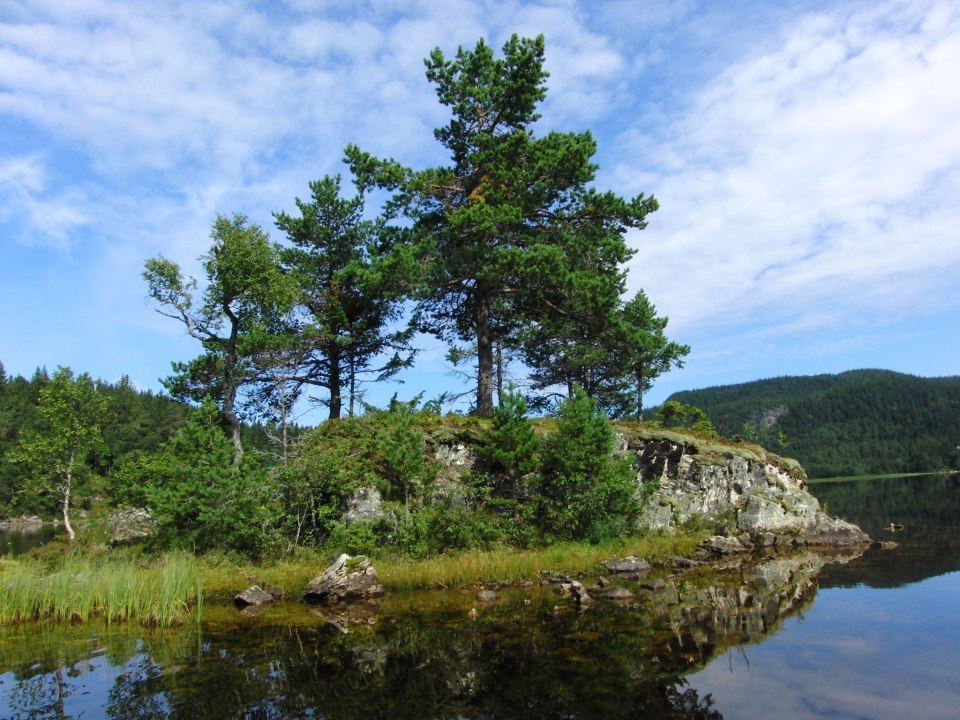
The Gjeldbukkholmen island in the lake Tørstadvatnet

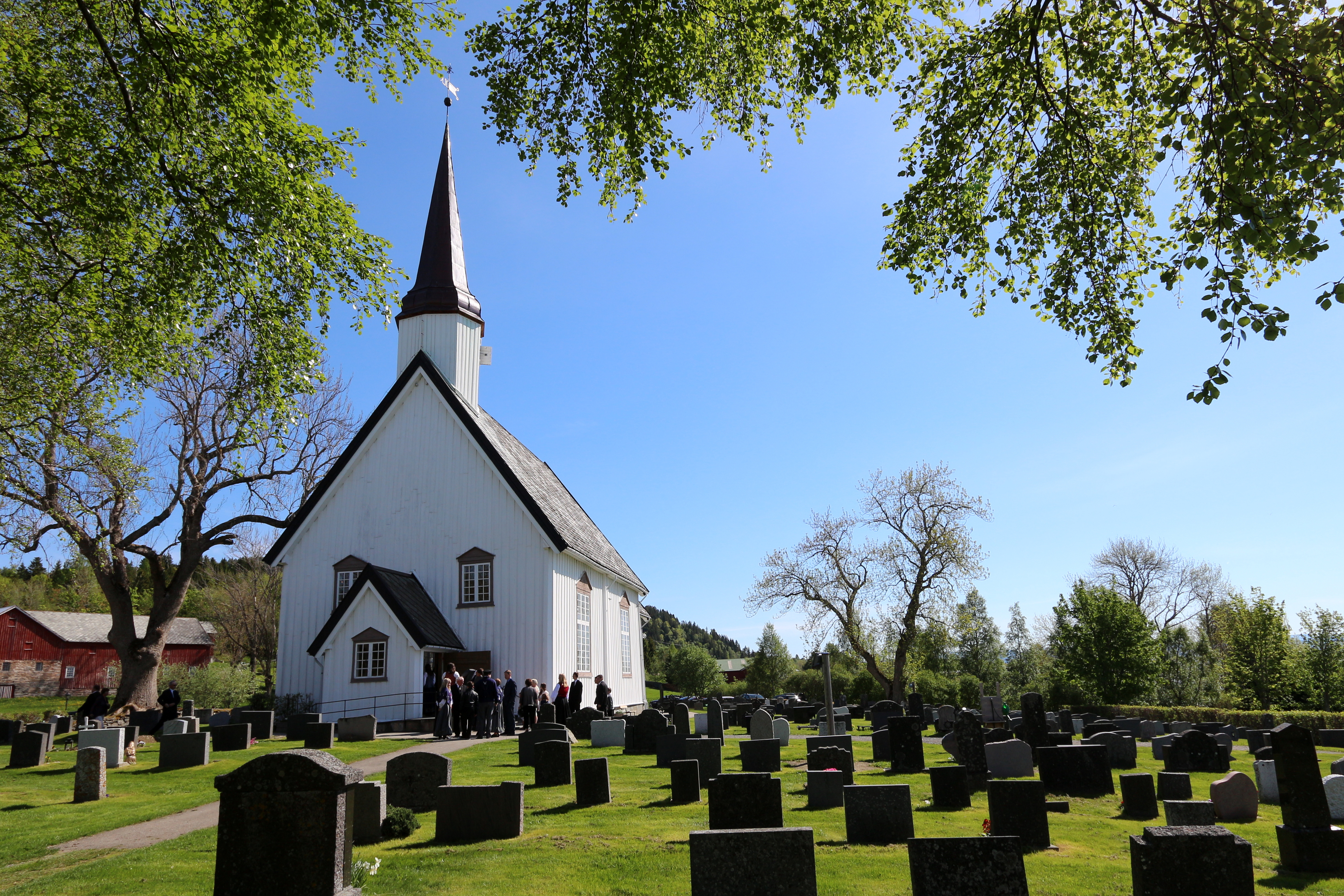
Leksvik Church

The municipality was established on 1 January 2018, the same day that Trøndelag county was established. Indre Fosen Municipality straddles the former county border, as it was formed by the unification of Leksvik Municipality (formerly in Nord-Trøndelag) and Rissa Municipality (formerly in Sør-Trøndelag).

On 1 January 2020, the Verrabotn area from the neighboring Verran Municipality was transferred to Indre Fosen Municipality.

=== Name ===
The municipality is named after the traditional district of Fosen in which it is located. The first element is indre which means "inner" in the Norwegian language. The last element is Fosen (Old Norse: Fólgsn) which means "hiding place" or "hidden port". Thus, the name refers to the inner part of the Fosen district. The district is named after the island of Storfosna ("Big Fosen") in Ørland Municipality.

=== Coat of arms ===
The coat of arms was adopted in 2017 for use starting on 1 January 2018 when the new municipality was established. These arms were originally granted to the old Leksvik Municipality on 28 September 1990 and then they were re-adopted for the new Indre Fosen Municipality after the merger of Leksvik Municipality and Rissa Municipality. The official blazon is "Per chevron embowed azure and argent point ending in trefoil" (Norwegian: I blått en innbøyd sølv spiss som ender i et kløverblad). This means the arms have a field (background) that is divided by a line in the shape of a chevron with curved sides that meet at a point. A trefoil is located on top of this point. The background above the line is blue and the background below this line has a tincture of argent which means it is commonly colored white, but if it is made out of metal, then silver is used. The blue part represents the Trondheimsfjord and the white/silver part represents the land, particularly the Amborneset peninsula where King Sverre Sigurdsson fought his last sea battle on 8 June 1198. There is a clover/trefoil design at the end of the silver part which represents life and growth. The arms were designed by Einar H. Skjærvold.

=== Churches ===
The Church of Norway has six parishes (Norwegian: sogn, which is both singular and plural) within the municipality. Together with the other municipalities on the Fosen peninsula (Osen, Ørland, and Åfjord), Indre Fosen is part of the Fosen prosti (deanery) in the Diocese of Nidaros.

Churches in Indre Fosen Municipality
Parish (sokn)	Church name	Location of the church	Year built
Hasselvika	Hasselvika Church	Hasselvika	1951
Leksvik	Leksvik Church	Leksvik	1670
Rissa	Fines Church	Verrabotn	1913
Rissa	Rissa Church	Leira	1888
Rissa	Rein Church	Reinsgrenda	1932
Stadsbygd	Stadsbygd Church	Stadsbygd	1842
Stranda	Stranda Church	Vanvikan	1897
Sør-Stjørna	Frengen Church	Frengen	1972
Sør-Stjørna	Ramsvik Church	Råkvåg	1909

== History ==
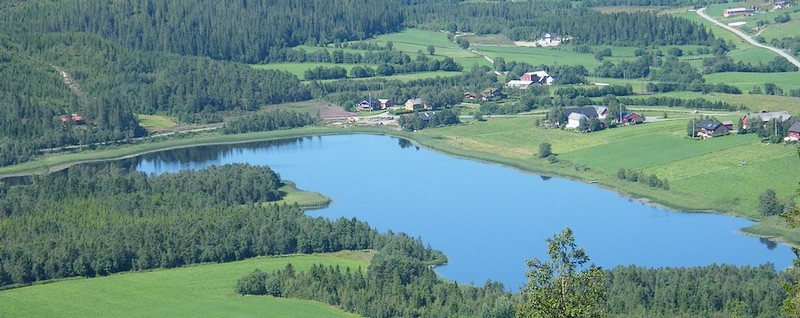
Rissa landscape

The first inhabitants are believed to have moved to this area some 3,000 years ago. They left several pieces of cutting tools which are now placed in museums. The Leksvik area does not appear in recorded history before the Viking Age when the villages of Leksvik and Hindrem became quite important in the local area. In both Leksvik and Hindrem there have been found great tombs and ruins of buildings and longboats. On Borgen, there is a hill between Hindrem and Seter that may have been a great Viking fortress, but this could also be tracks made by the glaciers during the last ice age. After the Black Death struck Norway in 1349, Leksvik fell into silence for some 300 years.

In more modern history, Leksvik and Hindrem are small and relatively isolated villages, north of Trondheimsfjord. Two churches stood here, a church in Leksvik and a stave church in Hindrem, but this broke down in 1655 and was replaced by a modern wooden church. In the 19th century, the church of Hindrem was demolished, and the new Stranda Church was built in Vanvikan. Leksvik became well known for its goats and had 5,000 of them at their peak number.

During World War II, Leksvik was settled by German troops with the main camp on the top of Våttåhaugen, a hill north of the village of Leksvik. But as a small and isolated village, nothing of great importance happened there during the war, and it was mostly peaceful although bombs fell over Trondheim, on the south side of the fjord. After electric power first came to Leksvik, Bjørn Lyng founded the first industry in Vanvikan and Leksvik. After the first road was finally finished in the early 1960s, industry grew rapidly and replaced the goats.

In April 1978, the Rissa area in what is now Indre Fosen was home to a quick-clay landslide which encompassed an area of 330,000 square metres (3,600,000 sq ft) and sent 6,000,000 cubic metres (7,800,000 yd^{3}) of clay from the Årnset area on the shore into the Botn lake, causing a miniature tsunami on the north shore in the village of Leira. This slide is particularly famous because a large portion of the slide happened to be recorded on film by two amateur photographers.

== Geography ==
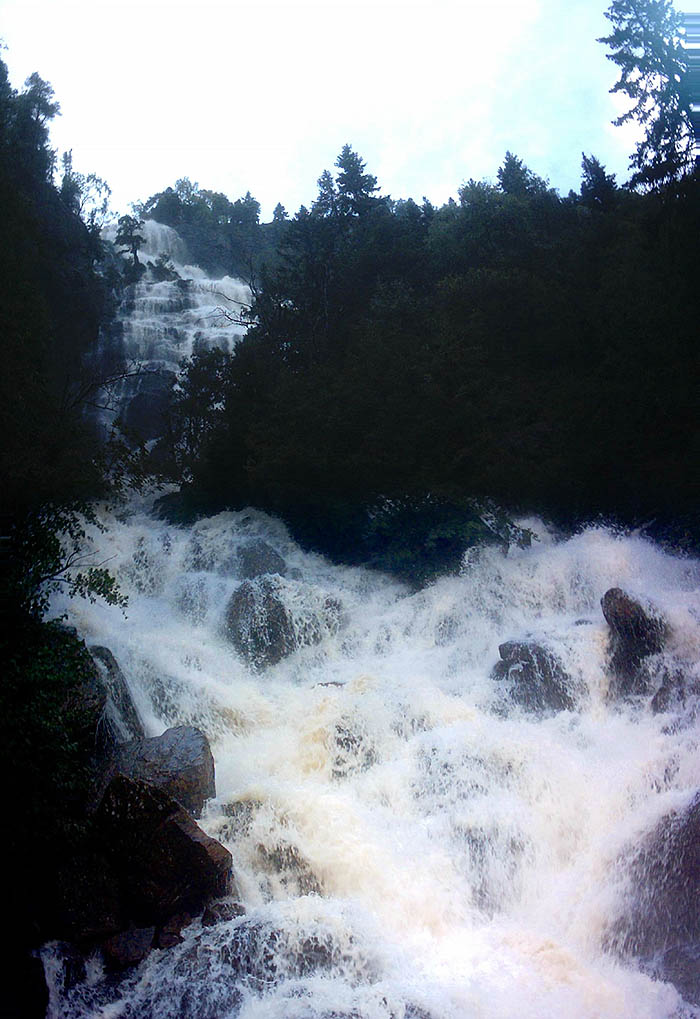
View of the Bjørnåa river and falls

Indre Fosen Municipality is located on the southern part of the Fosen peninsula along the coast of Trondheimsfjorden and the Stjørnfjorden, surrounding the municipality on three sides by water. There are several large lakes located in Indre Fosen Municipality including Storvatnet, Meltingvatnet, and Botn. The municipalities of Åfjord, Steinkjer, and Inderøy lie to the north and Ørland Municipality lies to the west. The highest point in the municipality is the 622.5-metre (2,042 ft) tall mountain Skorven.

The Flakk–Rørvik Ferry crosses the Trondheimsfjord connecting the village of Rørvik to the city of Trondheim to the south.

== Government ==
Indre Fosen Municipality is responsible for primary education (through 10th grade), outpatient health services, senior citizen services, welfare and other social services, zoning, economic development, and municipal roads and utilities. The municipality is governed by a municipal council of directly elected representatives. The mayor is indirectly elected by a vote of the municipal council. The municipality is under the jurisdiction of the Trøndelag District Court and the Frostating Court of Appeal.

Fosen Renovasjon is a intermunicipal waste management agency based at Årnset, established in 1997. It provided waste services in Rissa, while Leksvik had its services provided by Innherred Renovasjon. Fosen Renovasjon took over for the whole of Indre Fosen from 2020.

=== Municipal council ===
The municipal council (Kommunestyre) of Indre Fosen Municipality is made up of 27 representatives. The tables below show the current and historical composition of the council by political party.

Indre Fosen kommunestyre 2023–2027
Party name (in Norwegian)	Number of representatives
Labour Party (Arbeiderpartiet)	6
Progress Party (Fremskrittspartiet)	2
Conservative Party (Høyre)	5
Industry and Business Party (Industri‑ og Næringspartiet)	1
Christian Democratic Party (Kristelig Folkeparti)	1
Pensioners' Party (Pensjonistpartiet)	3
Centre Party (Senterpartiet)	5
Socialist Left Party (Sosialistisk Venstreparti)	1
Municipal List (Kommunelista)	3
Total number of members:	27

Indre Fosen kommunestyre 2019–2023
Party name (in Norwegian)	Number of representatives
Labour Party (Arbeiderpartiet)	6
Progress Party (Fremskrittspartiet)	2
Green Party (Miljøpartiet De Grønne)	1
Conservative Party (Høyre)	5
Christian Democratic Party (Kristelig Folkeparti)	1
Pensioners' Party (Pensjonistpartiet)	4
Centre Party (Senterpartiet)	10
Socialist Left Party (Sosialistisk Venstreparti)	2
Municipal List (Kommunelista)	6
Total number of members:	37

Indre Fosen kommunestyre 2018–2019
Party name (in Norwegian)	Number of representatives
Labour Party (Arbeiderpartiet)	15
Progress Party (Fremskrittspartiet)	3
Green Party (Miljøpartiet De Grønne)	1
Conservative Party (Høyre)	12
Christian Democratic Party (Kristelig Folkeparti)	2
Pensioners' Party (Pensjonistpartiet)	2
Centre Party (Senterpartiet)	9
Socialist Left Party (Sosialistisk Venstreparti)	2
Liberal Party (Venstre)	2
Total number of members:	48
Note: Rather than have new elections when the new Indre Fosen Municipality and its council were originally formed in 2018, members were carried over onto the new council. This council was essentially a merger of the old municipal councils of Leksvik Municipality and Rissa Municipality, with all members of the old serving on the new council.

=== Mayors ===
The mayor (Norwegian: ordfører) of Indre Fosen Municipality is the political leader of the municipality and the chairperson of the municipal council. Here is a list of people who have held this position:

- 2018–2019: Steinar Saghaug (H)
- 2019–2023: Bjørnar Buhaug (Sp)
- 2023–present: Oskar Småvik (H)

== Notable people ==
- Nils Waltersen Aasen (1878 in Stadsbygd – 1925), an arms inventor who developed the modern hand grenade and land mine just prior to WWI
- Anders John Aune (1923 in Stjørna – 2011), a Norwegian politician and county governor of Finnmark from 1974-1989
- Oddmund Raudberget (born 1932 in Stadsbygd), a Norwegian artist, painter, and sculptor
- Ingebjørg Karmhus (1936 in Leksvik – 2009), a Norwegian politician and Mayor of Leksvik from 1986 to 1999
- Villy Haugen (born 1944 in Leksvik), a former speed skater and bronze medallist at the 1964 Winter Olympics
- Einar Strøm (born 1945), a Norwegian politician and Mayor of Leksvik in 2007
- Bente Kvitland (born 1974), a Norwegian former footballer and Olympic champion with the Norway women's national football team; grew up in Skaugdalen
