= Dalbygda =

Village in Indre Fosen Municipality, Norway

- Village
- Interactive map of Dalbygda
- Location within Trøndelag Location within Norway
- Coordinates: 63.7092°N 10.6362°E
- Country: Norway
- Region: Central Norway
- County: Trøndelag
- District: Fosen
- Municipality: Indre Fosen
- Elevation: 210 m (690 ft)
- Time zone: UTC+01:00 (CET)
  - Summer (DST): UTC+02:00 (CEST)
- Post Code: 7120 Leksvik

Dalbygda is a village in Indre Fosen Municipality in Trøndelag county, Norway. It is located about 5 kilometres (3.1 mi) to the northeast of the village of Leksvik, along the Norwegian County Road 755. The area had its own school until 1966 when it was closed and the students now go to Leksvik school. The village lies in a valley that is assumed to have been a glacial lake that eventually drained into the sea. The flat area is a typical farming village with agriculture and livestock.
