= Motvind Norge =

Norwegian organization

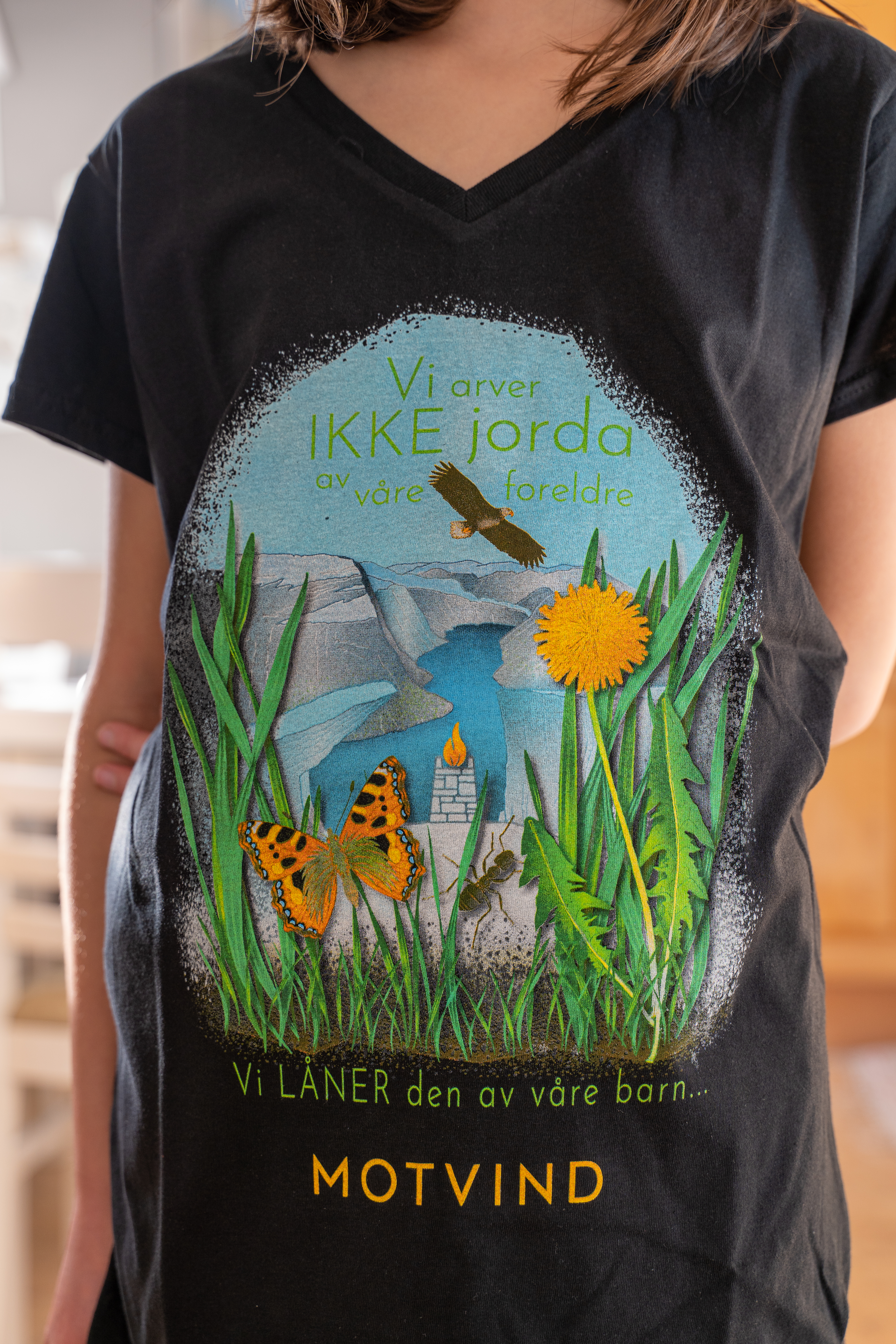
- Founded: 7 September 2019
- Type: forening/lag/innretning
- Headquarters: Oslo
- Location: Norway
- Website: motvind.org

Motvind Norge (transl. Headwind Norway, abbreviated MN) is a Norwegian organization that fights against wind power development in Norway. The organization's purpose is to stop the development of wind power plants in Norway, regardless of planning and development status, and "transl. wishes to help homeowners and land owners who feel run over by the wind power developers".

MN was established on 7 September 2019, and had its first national meeting in Frøya Municipality on 16 November 2019, as an association of local action groups.

Rune Haaland was employed as the organization's first general secretary. The organization refers to wind power projects as an "transl. assault on nature, the environment and local communities, and a violation of people's sense of justice."

== Actions ==
During the coronavirus pandemic in 2019–2020, Motvind Norge blocked County Road 465 in Kvinesdal Municipality with chains. The police had to intervene and one person was fined.

In May 2020, the development of a wind power plant was tried in court for the first time. The case was between Motvind Norge and the Vardafjellet Wind Power Plant, and Motvind Norge wanted to stop the development through a temporary injunction. The court noted that it is not a superior administrative body with conversion competence, and Motvind Norge lost the case and had to pay court costs of 1,366,934 NOK (≈ 126,072 USD).

In July 2023, demonstrators in Fosen were removed by the police. The Supreme Court ruled in 2021 that the concession for the wind power plants at Storheia and Roan were illegal, and the demonstrators protested that the state did not follow up on the verdict.
