= Per Skjærvik =

Norwegian politician (born 1953)

Per Skjærvik (born 16 May 1953 on Stokkøya in the Åfjord Municipality) is a Norwegian politician for the Labour Party.

He served as a deputy representative in the Parliament of Norway from Sør-Trøndelag during the term 2005–2009.

On the local level Skjærvik was mayor of Rissa Municipality between 1998 and 2011.
