= Stadsbygd =

Village in Indre Fosen Municipality, Norway

Stadsbygd Askjem
- Village
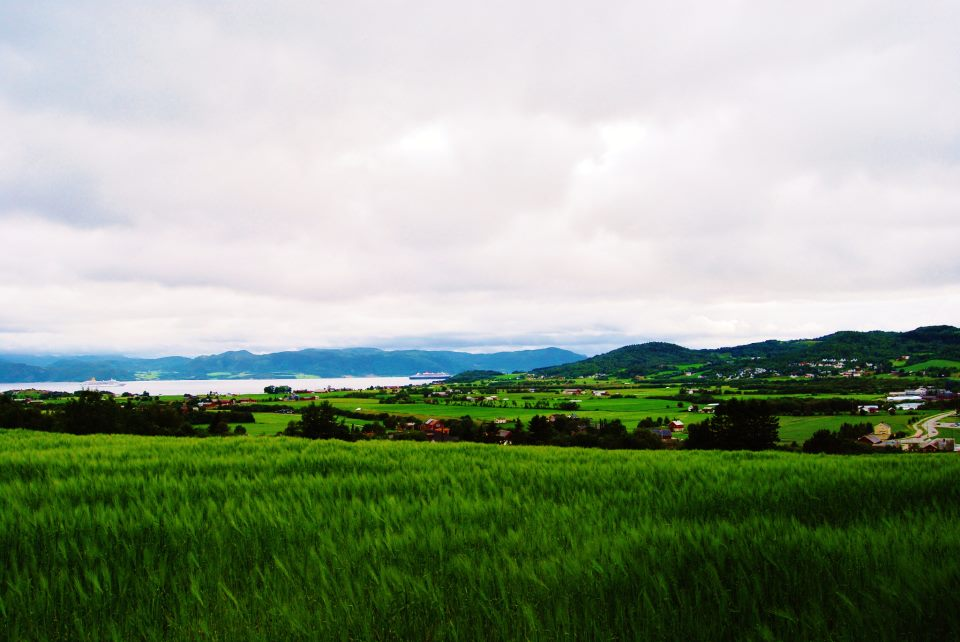
- View of the village area in the distance
- Interactive map of Stadsbygd
- Location within Trøndelag Location within Norway
- Coordinates: 63.5104°N 10.0169°E
- Country: Norway
- Region: Central Norway
- County: Trøndelag
- District: Fosen
- Municipality: Indre Fosen

Area
  - Total: 0.37 km^{2} (0.14 sq mi)
- Elevation: 30 m (98 ft)

Population (2024)
  - Total: 319
  - Density: 862/km^{2} (2,230/sq mi)
- Time zone: UTC+01:00 (CET)
  - Summer (DST): UTC+02:00 (CEST)
- Post Code: 7105 Stadsbygd

Stadsbygd or Askjem is a village in Indre Fosen Municipality in Trøndelag county, Norway. The village is located at the southern end of the Fosen peninsula in a wide, flat valley along the north side of the Trondheimsfjord. The village of Rørvika lies about 8 kilometres (5.0 mi) to the east, and that is where the Flakk–Rørvik Ferry links the area with the city of Trondheim to the southeast. The municipal centre of Årnset lies about 12 kilometres (7.5 mi) to the northwest.

The 0.37-square-kilometre (91-acre) village has a population (2024) of 319 and a population density of 862 inhabitants per square kilometre (2,230/sq mi).

The village was the administrative centre of the old Stadsbygd Municipality that existed until 1964. The main church for the village and surrounding area is Stadsbygd Church, located just south of the village of Stadsbygd. Prior to 2021, Statistics Norway titled the village Askjem, after the farm area on the western side of the village, but since 2022, Statistics Norway has named the area Stadsbygd, after the historic name for the village area.

== Notable residents ==
- Nils Waltersen Aasen (1878–1925), a Norwegian inventor
- Oddmund Raudberget (born 1932), an artist, painter, and sculptor

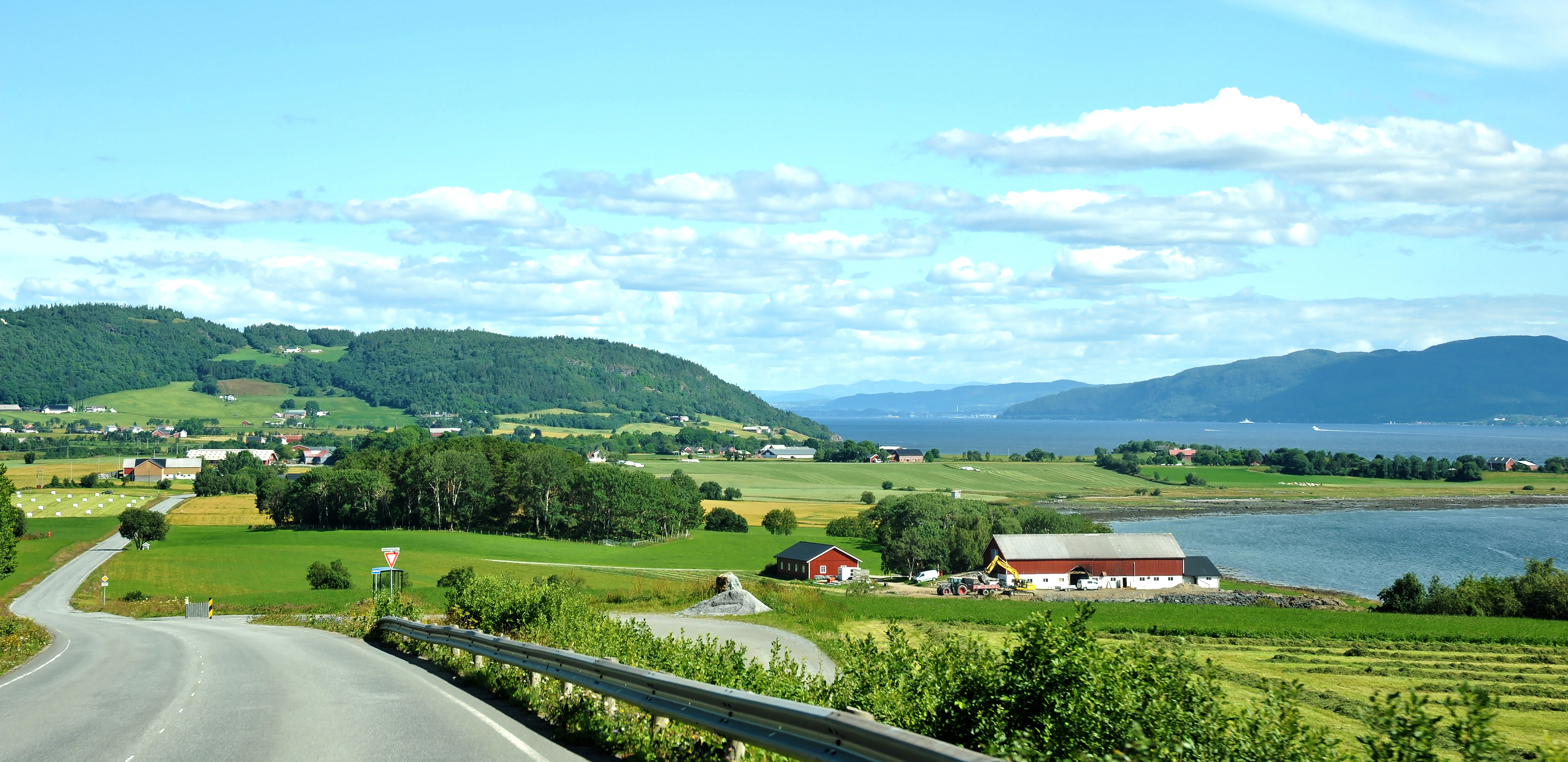
Stadsbygd with Trondheimsfjord and Byneset in the background
