= Rørvika, Trøndelag =

Village in Indre Fosen Municipality, Norway

Rørvika
- Village
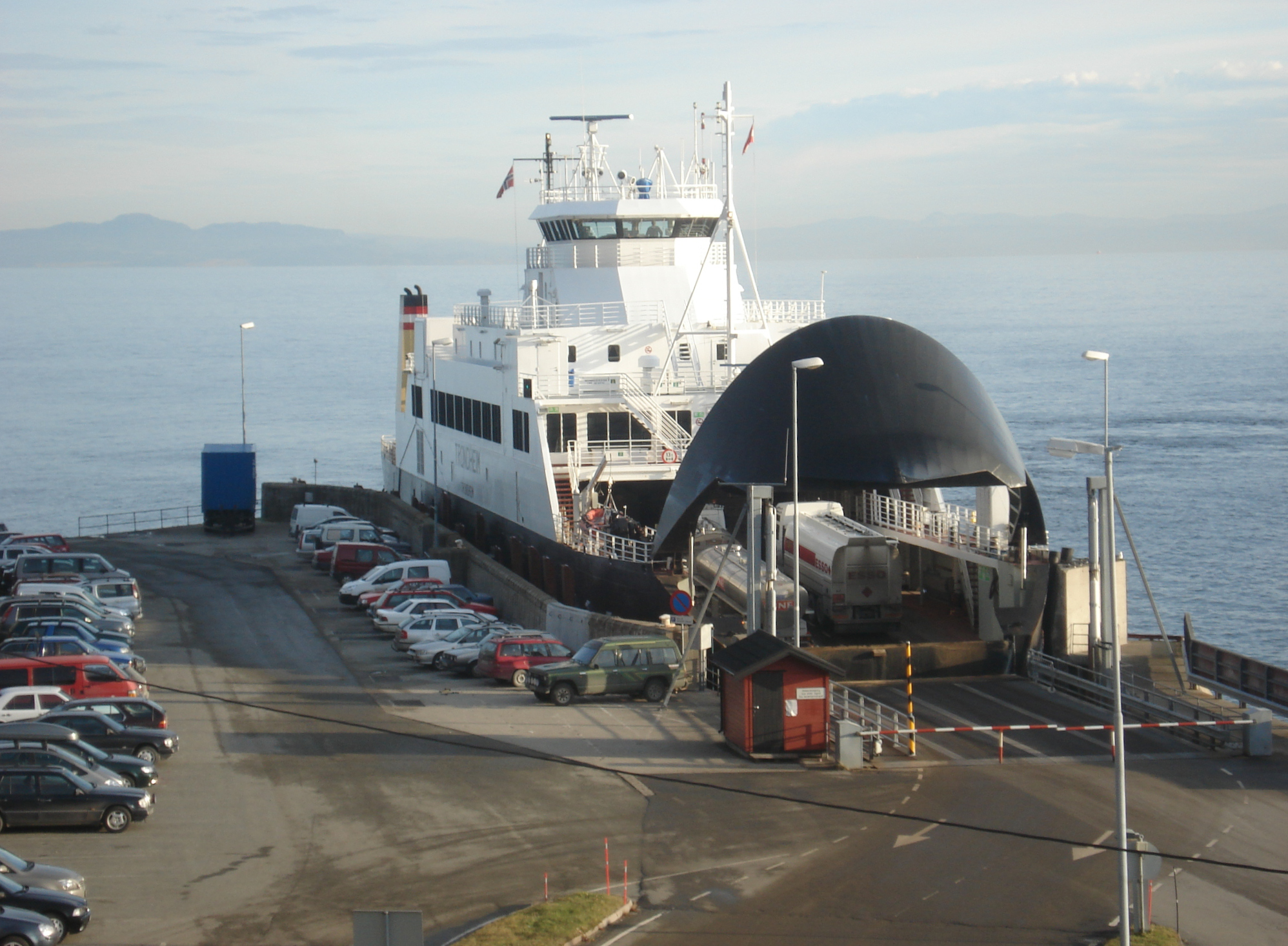
- View of the village ferry port
- Interactive map of Rørvika
- Location within Trøndelag Location within Norway
- Coordinates: 63.5091°N 10.1333°E
- Country: Norway
- Region: Central Norway
- County: Trøndelag
- District: Fosen
- Municipality: Indre Fosen
- Elevation: 31 m (102 ft)
- Time zone: UTC+01:00 (CET)
  - Summer (DST): UTC+02:00 (CEST)
- Post Code: 7105 Stadsbygd

Rørvika is a village in Indre Fosen Municipality in Trøndelag county, Norway. It is located along the Trondheimsfjord about 7.5 kilometres (4.7 mi) east of the village of Stadsbygd and the smaller neighboring hamlet of Askjem. The lake Storvatnet lies about 9 kilometres (5.6 mi) north of the village.

Norwegian County Road 715 and Norwegian County Road 717 meet at Rørvik, and Fv 715 continues across the Trondheimsfjord as part of the Flakk–Rørvik Ferry, which has one terminus at Rørvika.
