= Hasselvika Church =

Church in Trøndelag, Norway

- Hasselvika kirke
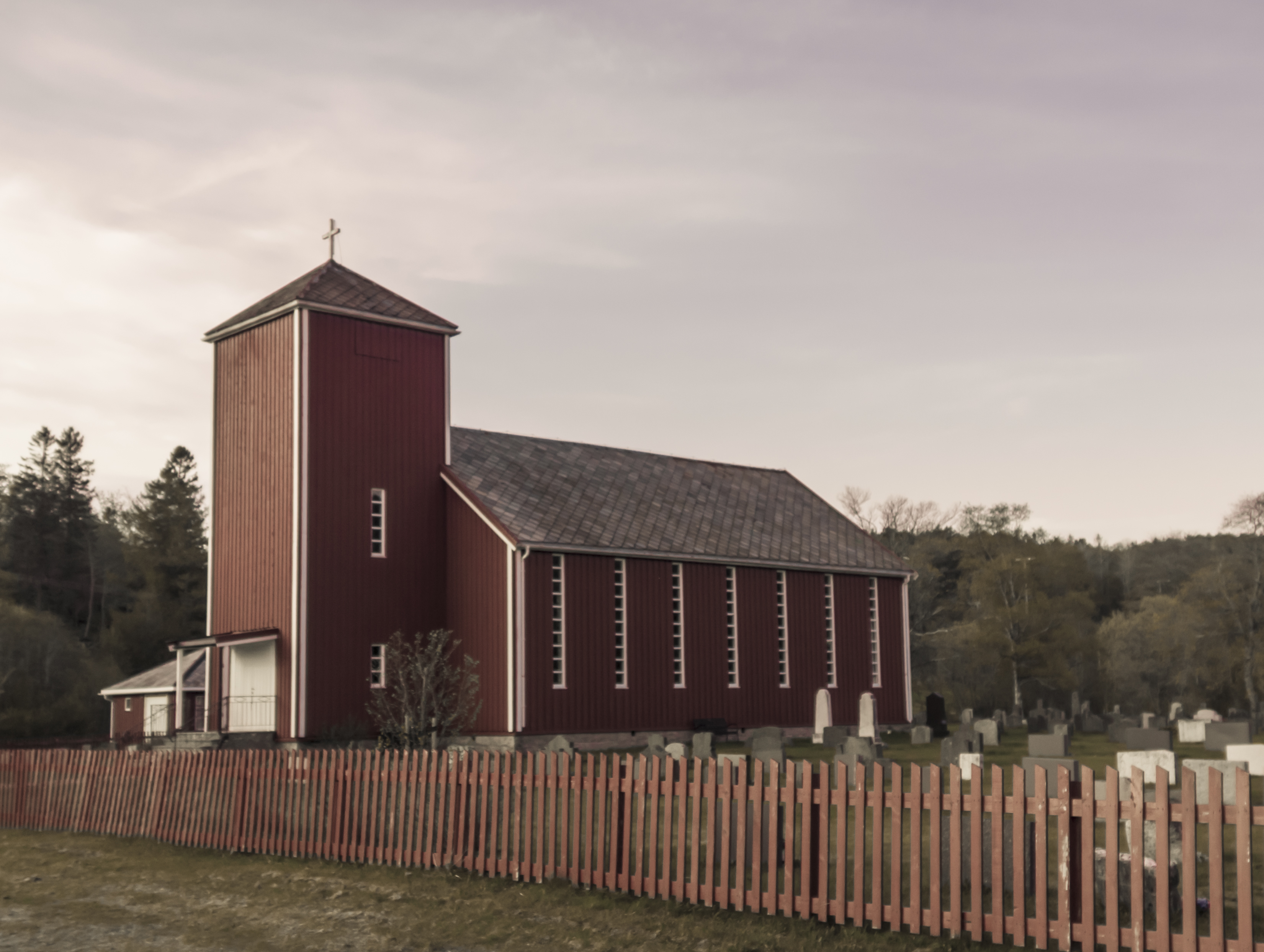
- View of the church
- Hasselvika Church
- 63.63135292°N 09.840102195°E
- Location: Indre Fosen, Trøndelag
- Country: Norway
- Denomination: Church of Norway
- Churchmanship: Evangelical Lutheran

History
- Status: Parish church
- Founded: 1951
- Consecrated: 1951

Architecture
- Functional status: Active
- Architect: Claus Hjelte
- Architectural type: Long church
- Completed: 1951 (75 years ago)

Specifications
- Capacity: 200
- Materials: Wood

Administration
- Diocese: Nidaros bispedømme
- Deanery: Fosen prosti
- Parish: Hasselvika
- Norwegian Cultural Heritage Site
- Type: Church
- Status: Not protected
- ID: 84491

Hasselvika Church (Norwegian: Hasselvika kirke) is a parish church of the Church of Norway in Indre Fosen Municipality in Trøndelag county, Norway. It is located in the village of Hasselvika, along the Stjørnfjorden. It is the church for the Hasselvika parish which is part of the Fosen prosti (deanery) in the Diocese of Nidaros. The red, wooden church was built in a long church style in 1951 using plans drawn up by the architect Claus Hjelte (1884–1969). The church seats about 200 people.

== See also ==
- List of churches in Nidaros
