= Botn (Trøndelag) =

Inland fjord in Indre Fosen, Norway

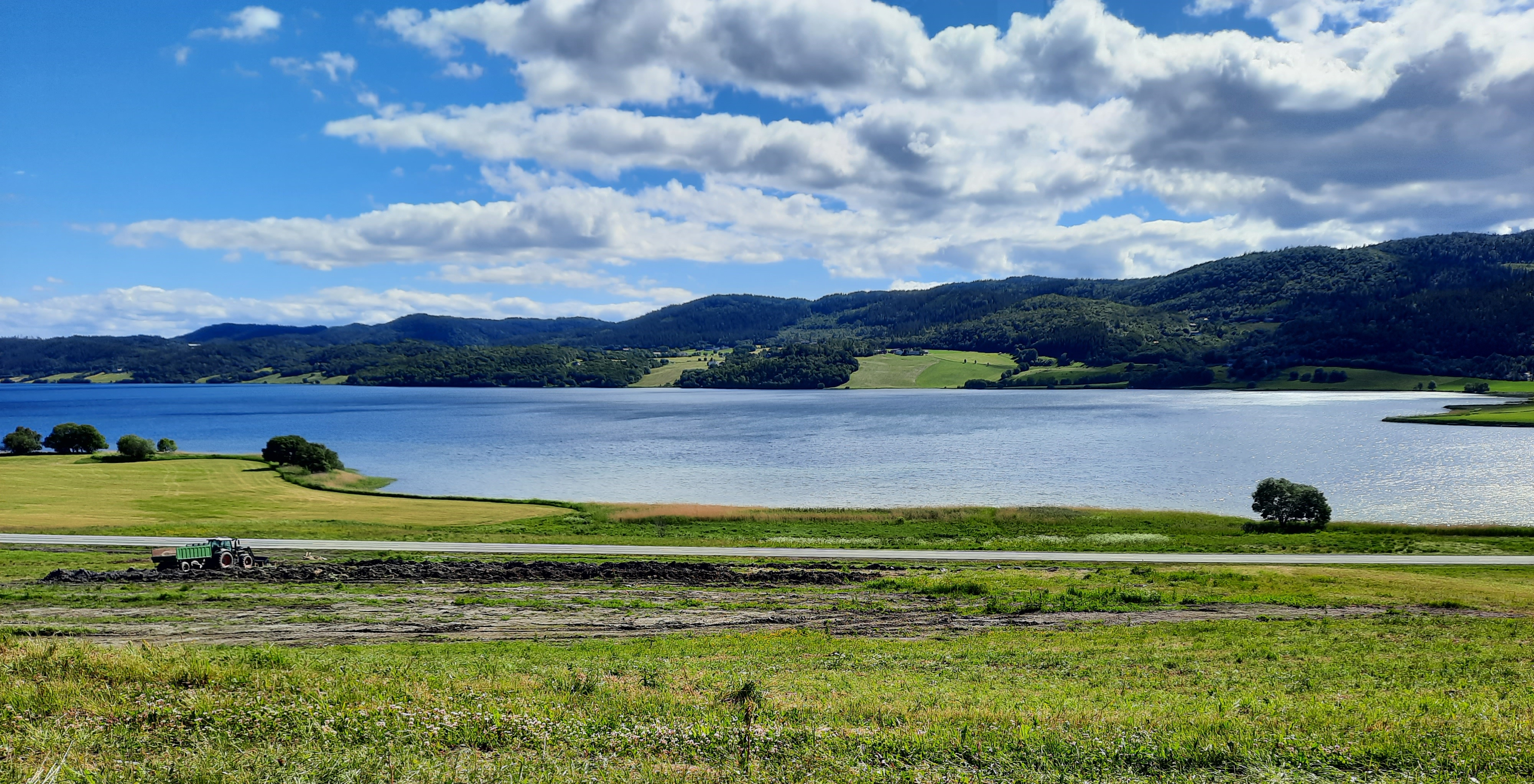
- Interactive map of the lake
- Location: Indre Fosen, Trøndelag
- Coordinates: 63.5749°N 09.9646°E
- Primary outflows: Strømmen
- Basin countries: Norway
- Max. length: 5.5 kilometres (3.4 mi)
- Max. width: 1.4 kilometres (0.87 mi)
- Surface area: 5.52 km^{2} (2.13 sq mi)
- Average depth: 21 metres (69 ft)
- Max. depth: 45 metres (148 ft)
- Water volume: 0.112 cubic kilometres (146,000,000 yd^{3})
- Shore length^{1}: 13.11 kilometres (8.15 mi)
- Surface elevation: 2 metres (6 ft 7 in)
- References: NVE
- ^{1} Shore length is not a well-defined measure.

Botn (nicknamed: Rissa-Botn) is an inland fjord in Indre Fosen Municipality in Trøndelag county, Norway. It flows through a short, small river into the Sundsbukta, a small bay off the Trondheimsfjorden. The village of Årnset lies on the north shore of Botn.

== Hydrography and water quality ==
The extraordinarily shallow, narrow, and long inlet restrains the water exchange severely. The daily tidal amplitude is in the order of centimetres, about 1/10 of the tidal amplitude of the supplying Trondheimsfjord. The shallow river connecting Botn to the Trondheimsfjord blocks out more than half of the tidal wave, making the moon-phase driven tidal flood height cycles the primal driving force for the internal water level, with an abnormally small neap flood effect (zero has been observed during lowest neap tides and meteorologically suppressed sea level).

In addition, the inlet is connected to a secluded bay sheltered from the strong tidal currents in the main fjord. This leads to accumulation and recycling of the exported surface brackish water, heavily reducing the sea water portion of imported water that can sink in and refresh the deeper waters, thus giving a natural stratification with stagnant (uninhabitable) water below a depth of 7 to 10 metres (23 to 33 ft), and a poisonous rotten bottom water beneath 30 metres (98 ft). As another unusual anomaly, this hydrographic blocking of seawater seems to persist in calm periods even in the winter, denying import of the usual winterly bottom water renewal that otherwise is normal in fjords, and leading to a decrease in Botn's deep water oxygen levels during winter.

With a gradually descending bottom slope beneath the inlet, the basin lacks strong internal thresholds (abruptly steepening slopes) that often isolates the deep of fjord basins from imported tidal currents, thus leaving the Botn basin 'hydrodynamically open' (with very weak topographical stratifications). Thus, the annually induced stagnation depth varies with the volume and energy of the tidal instream in the critical time when the spring flood dilutes the incoming water rapidly, and accumulating differences along the current shear creates the stratification. Naturally there is also a bottom water stratification between semi-ventilated deep water (uninhabitable but not rotten) and totally isolated poisonous bottom water.

The long and 'river-like' inlet with streaming water makes ideal growing conditions for seaweed and mussels, which was scraped for use as angling bait up until the end of World War II. Late in the 1970s, increasing agricultural eutrophication and further reduced water exchange from the growing mussel banks in the inlet led Botn to an ecological crisis with surface algal blooms and lifting of very poisonous rotten bottom water. To improve conditions in Botn, the old Rissa Municipality council (the predecessor to Indre Fosen Municipality) restricted the eutrophication in the drainage area and installed a bubbler facility (like in an aquarium but bigger) at a depth of 30 metres (98 ft) to distribute more of the water exchange to deeper levels.

== The Great Quick Clay Slide of 1978 ==
On 29 April 1978, a big quick clay slide eradicated several farms on the southeast corner of Botn, killing only one person. Many inhabitants fled from the scene as the edge ate its way inward from the shore. Two local teenagers made a famous 8 mm film of the cracking, sliding, and collapsing of the clay landscape. A 3-metre (9.8 ft) high tsunami caused some destruction on the northern shore of Botn.

== See also ==
- List of lakes in Norway
