= Storvatnet (Indre Fosen) =

Lake in Indre Fosen, Norway

Storavatnet
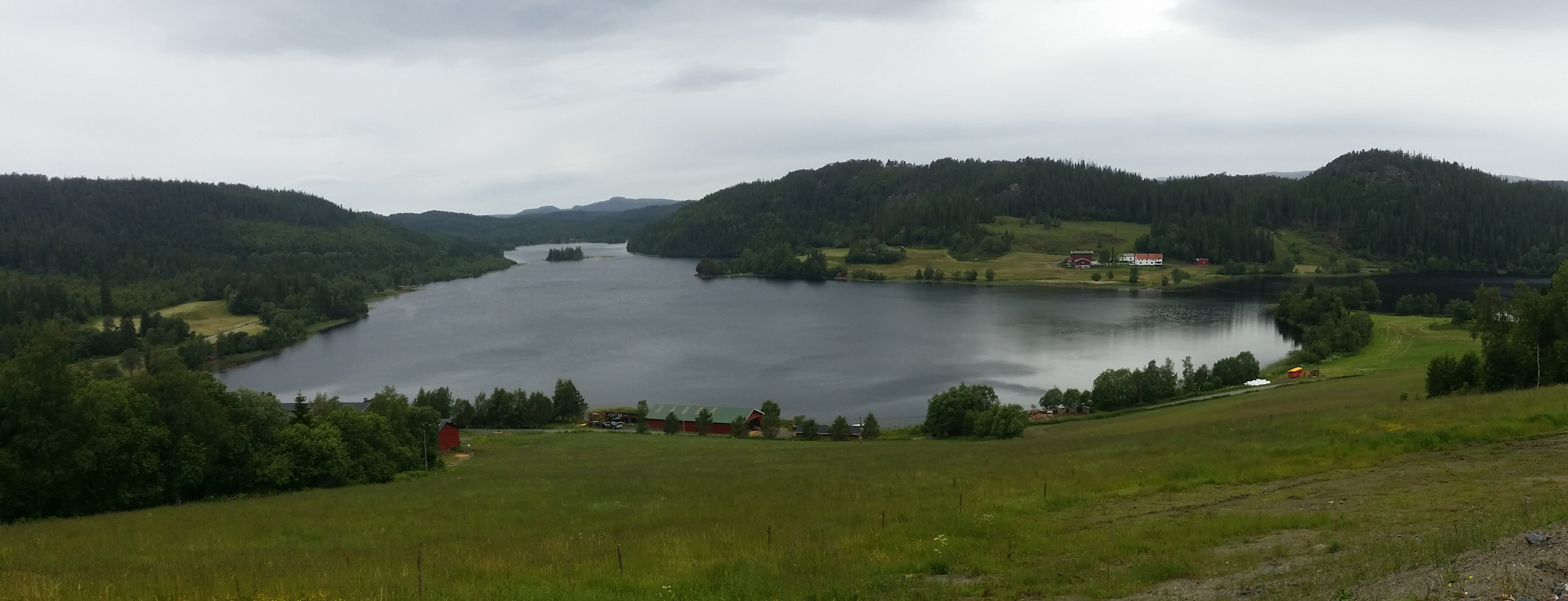
- A portion of Storvatnet lake
- Interactive map of the lake
- Location: Indre Fosen, Trøndelag
- Coordinates: 63.6202°N 10.1960°E
- Basin countries: Norway
- Max. length: 9 kilometres (5.6 mi)
- Max. width: 4 kilometres (2.5 mi)
- Surface area: 15.78 km^{2} (6.09 sq mi)
- Shore length^{1}: 75.6 kilometres (47.0 mi)
- Surface elevation: 132 metres (433 ft)
- References: NVE
- ^{1} Shore length is not a well-defined measure.

Storvatnet is a lake in Indre Fosen Municipality in Trøndelag county, Norway. The 15.78 square kilometres (6.09 sq mi) lake is located about 10 kilometres (6.2 mi) east of the village of Årnset and about 5 kilometres (3.1 mi) north of the village of Vanvikan. It is the largest lake on the Fosen peninsula.

== See also ==
- List of lakes in Norway
