= Oddmund Raudberget =

Norwegian artist, painter, and sculptor (born 1932)

Oddmund Raudberget (born July 12, 1932) is a Norwegian artist, painter, and sculptor.

Raudberget was born in Stadsbygd and as an adult has lived in Oslo, Asker, and Drammen. From 1951 to 1954, Raudberget attended the Trondheim Academy of Fine Art. From 1953 to 1954 he also studied stone cutting at Nidaros Cathedral. From 1954 to 1957, Raudberget studied at the Norwegian National Academy of Fine Arts under Per Palle Storm, where he also took fresco classes from 1957 to 1958, and he attended the Royal Danish Academy of Fine Arts in 1959. Raudberget's works are displayed at the National Museum of Art, Architecture and Design and other institutions, and are also included in many public and private collections.

Raudberget debuted as a sculptor in 1955 with his work Guttehode (Boy's Head) in fired clay. His early work, such as his portrait of Nils Kærup Bjørneboe, shows good characterization and a strong surface technique. Eventually, simplification in his surface technique became apparent. The half-figure Martine is also one of Raudberget's best works. As a sculptor, Raudberget uses a figurative approach and is considered representative of the classical orientation in postwar sculpture. He has worked extensively with portraits and medals.

Raudberget started drawing animals as a child and has he retained his interest in them as a sculptor. He has created many animal sculptures, often executed in hammered and driven metal. Since the mid-1970s horses' heads and horse figures have been an increasing part of his work. Among other works, his horse sculptures stand in his hometown of Rissa, in Oslo's Bjerkebanen neighborhood, and at the Hå Museum in Jæren. Raudberget's Hest og mann (Horse and Man) along the main road in Horgen in Nedre Eiker also well known.

In addition to his sculptures, Raudberget has also produced many drawings and paintings.
