= Frengen Church =

Church in Trøndelag, Norway

- Frengen kirke
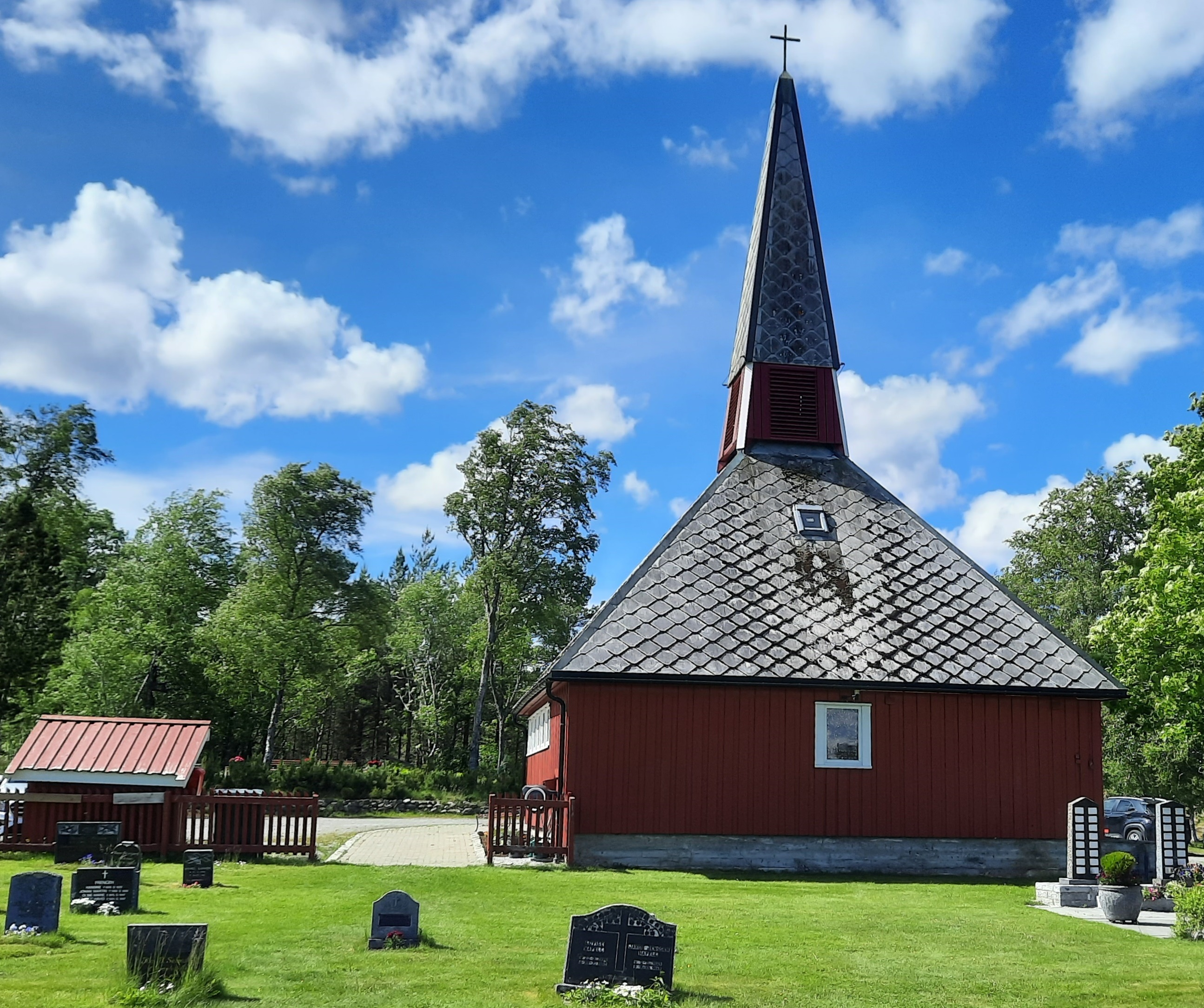
- View of the church
- Frengen Church
- 63.6962878°N 09.9107854°E
- Location: Indre Fosen, Trøndelag
- Country: Norway
- Denomination: Church of Norway
- Churchmanship: Evangelical Lutheran

History
- Status: Chapel
- Founded: 1972
- Consecrated: 1972

Architecture
- Functional status: Active
- Architect: Torgeir Sund
- Architectural type: Rectangular
- Completed: 1972 (54 years ago)

Specifications
- Capacity: 90
- Materials: Wood

Administration
- Diocese: Nidaros bispedømme
- Deanery: Fosen prosti
- Parish: Sør-Stjørna

Frengen Church (Norwegian: Frengen kirke) is a chapel in Indre Fosen Municipality in Trøndelag county, Norway. It is located in the village of Frengen on the south shore of the Stjørnfjorden. It is an annex chapel for the Sør-Stjørna parish which is part of the Fosen prosti (deanery) in the Diocese of Nidaros. The white, wooden church was built in a rectangular style in 1972 using plans drawn up by the architect Torgeir Sund. Originally, it was the chapel for the cemetery, but it was later expanded and made into a church. The church seats about 90 people.

== See also ==
- List of churches in Nidaros
