= Stadsbygd Church =

Church in Trøndelag, Norway

- Stadsbygd kirke
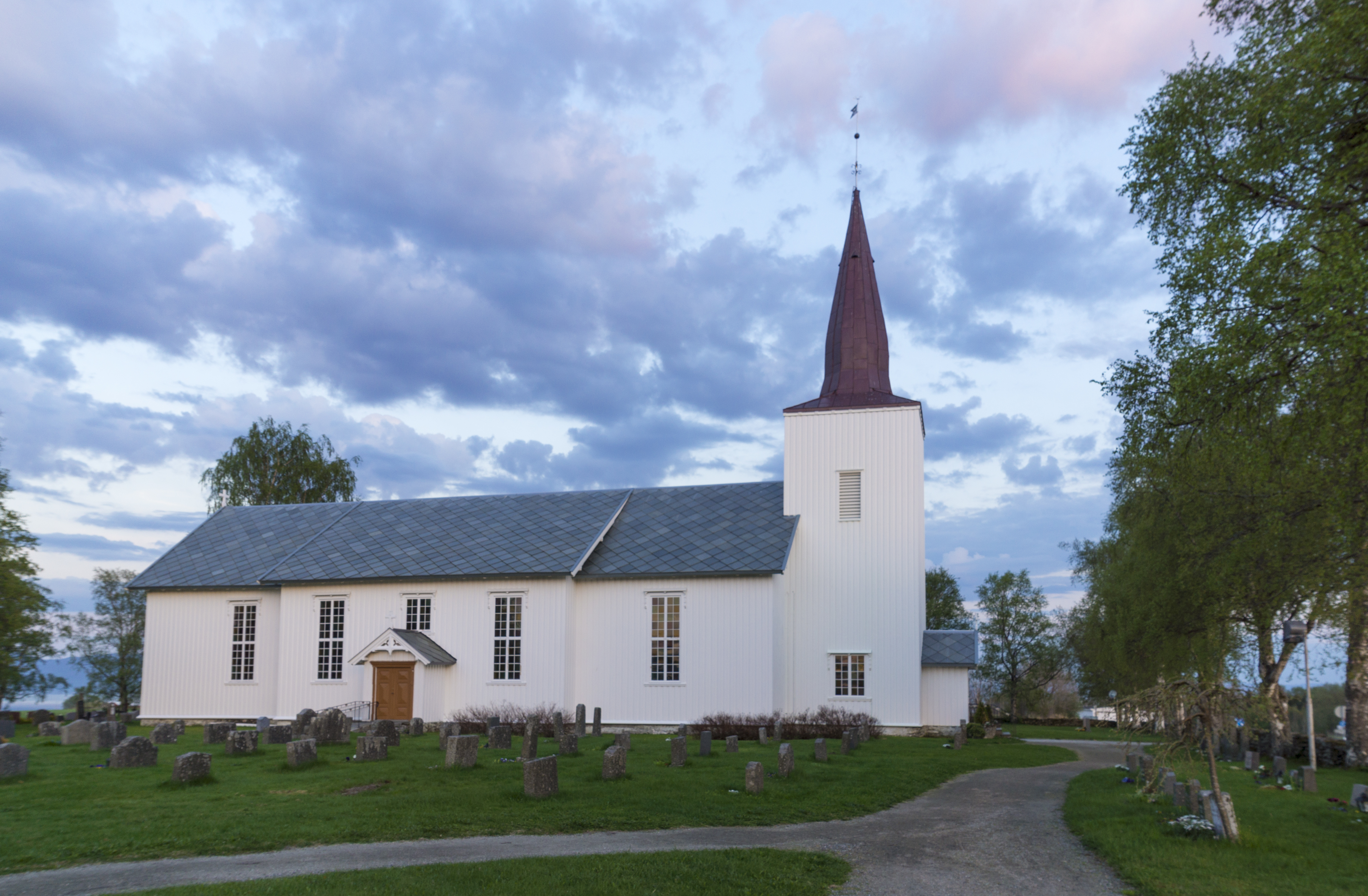
- View of the church
- Stadsbygd Church
- 63.49836577°N 10.00940859°E
- Location: Indre Fosen Municipality, Trøndelag
- Country: Norway
- Denomination: Church of Norway
- Churchmanship: Evangelical Lutheran

History
- Status: Parish church
- Founded: 12th century
- Consecrated: 31 July 1842

Architecture
- Functional status: Active
- Architect: Theodor Christian Broch
- Architectural type: Long church
- Completed: 1842 (184 years ago)

Specifications
- Capacity: 470
- Length: 34 metres (112 ft)
- Width: 12.5 metres (41 ft)
- Materials: Wood

Administration
- Diocese: Nidaros bispedømme
- Deanery: Fosen prosti
- Parish: Stadsbygd
- Norwegian Cultural Heritage Site
- Type: Church
- Status: Automatically protected
- ID: 85540

Stadsbygd Church (Norwegian: Stadsbygd kirke) is a parish church of the Church of Norway in Indre Fosen Municipality in Trøndelag county, Norway. It is located on the south side of the village of Stadsbygd. It is the church for the Stadsbygd parish which is part of the Fosen prosti (deanery) in the Diocese of Nidaros. The white, wooden church was built in a long church style in 1842 using plans drawn up by the architect Theodor Christian Broch. The church seats about 470 people.

== History ==
The first church in Stadsbygd was located at Lille-Rein. This stave church was built during the 1100s and it is mentioned in the Sturlunga saga where it talks about a priest named Ingemund who served at the church in 1184. Around the same time, there was also an annex chapel for the church a short distance to the west at Alshaug (the present location of the church). This smaller annex chapel was also a stave church design. The main church at Lille-Rein was closed and torn down during the late 1400s or early 1500s, but the annex chapel at Alshaug remained in use serving the parish.

After the first church on Alshaug was torn down around the year 1658, the construction of a new church began immediately afterwards. This new church was blown over in a storm before it was completely finished. The construction resumed soon after and the timber-framed long church was finally completed in 1660. It had an entry porch on the west end of the building with a small tower on the western end of the roof. A sacristy was located on the east end of the building. The church from 1660 stood about 180 metres (590 ft) south of the old (and current) church site, just west of the rectory, where the site and the cemetery are still visible. Maintenance work was carried out on the church in 1674. On 20 October 1837, the church was struck by lightning and burned to the ground.

After the fire, the old church was torn down and plans for a new church were made. It was decided to build the new church on the site of the medieval church, about 180 metres (590 ft) to the north of the site of the previous church. The new church would be based on standardized church plans made by Hans Linstow, edited by the engineer Theodor Christian Broch who oversaw the construction. Borch allegedly combined the nave from one church model with the tower from another. The lead builder was Erik Johnsen Trotland. The construction took place from 1840 to 1842 during a period of conflict between the private church owner and the local parish priest. The church was consecrated on 31 July 1842. In 1859, the parish purchased the church from the private owner. Until the 1860s, the church had a red-painted nave and a white-painted tower. Since then, the church has been painted white. The church was restored and refurbished several times: 1888–1892, 1962–1963, and in 1992.

== Media gallery ==
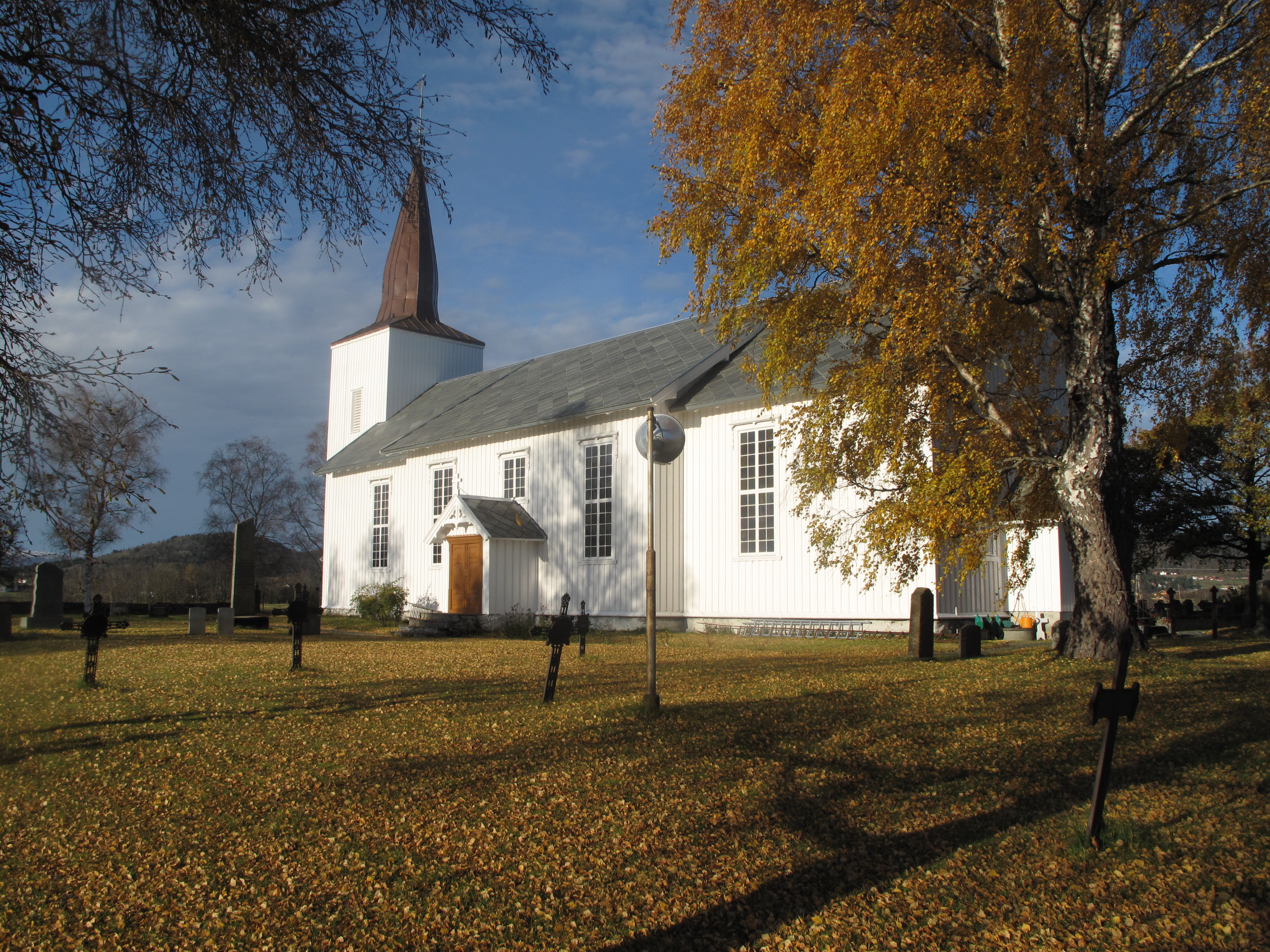

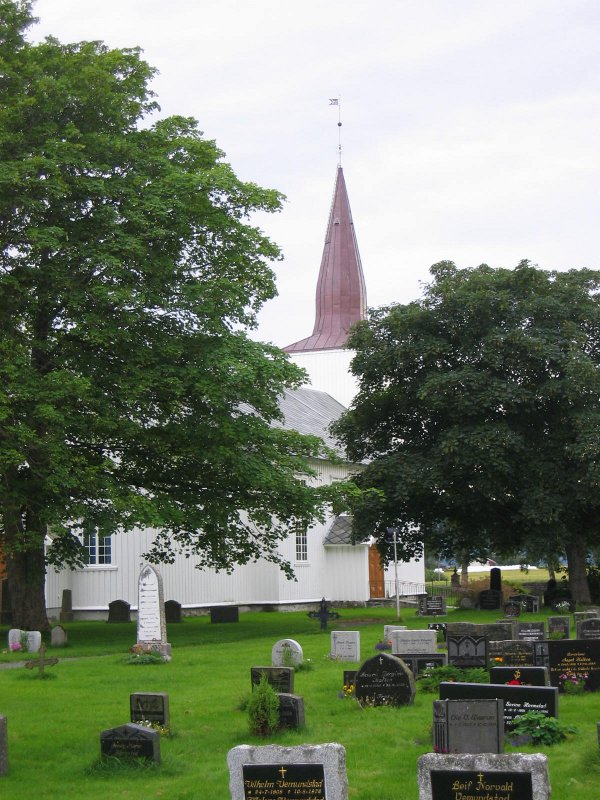

== See also ==
- List of churches in Nidaros
