= Rissa Church =

Church in Trøndelag, Norway

- Rissa kirke
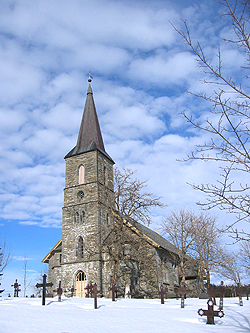
- View of the church
- Rissa Church
- 63.60587411°N 10.012420714°E
- Location: Indre Fosen Municipality, Trøndelag
- Country: Norway
- Denomination: Church of Norway
- Churchmanship: Evangelical Lutheran

History
- Status: Parish church
- Founded: 1888
- Consecrated: 26 Oct 1888

Architecture
- Functional status: Active
- Architect: Carl J. Bergstrøm
- Architectural type: Long church
- Completed: 1888 (138 years ago)

Specifications
- Capacity: 650
- Materials: Wood

Administration
- Diocese: Nidaros bispedømme
- Deanery: Fosen prosti
- Parish: Rissa
- Norwegian Cultural Heritage Site
- Type: Church
- Status: Listed
- ID: 85303

Rissa Church (Norwegian: Rissa kirke) is a parish church of the Church of Norway in Indre Fosen Municipality in Trøndelag county, Norway. It is located in the village of Leira, just northeast of the village of Årnset. It is one of the churches for the Rissa parish which is part of the Fosen prosti (deanery) in the Diocese of Nidaros. The gray, stone church was built in a long church style in 1888 using plans drawn up by the architect Carl Julius Bergstrøm (1828–1898). The church seats about 650 people.

== History ==
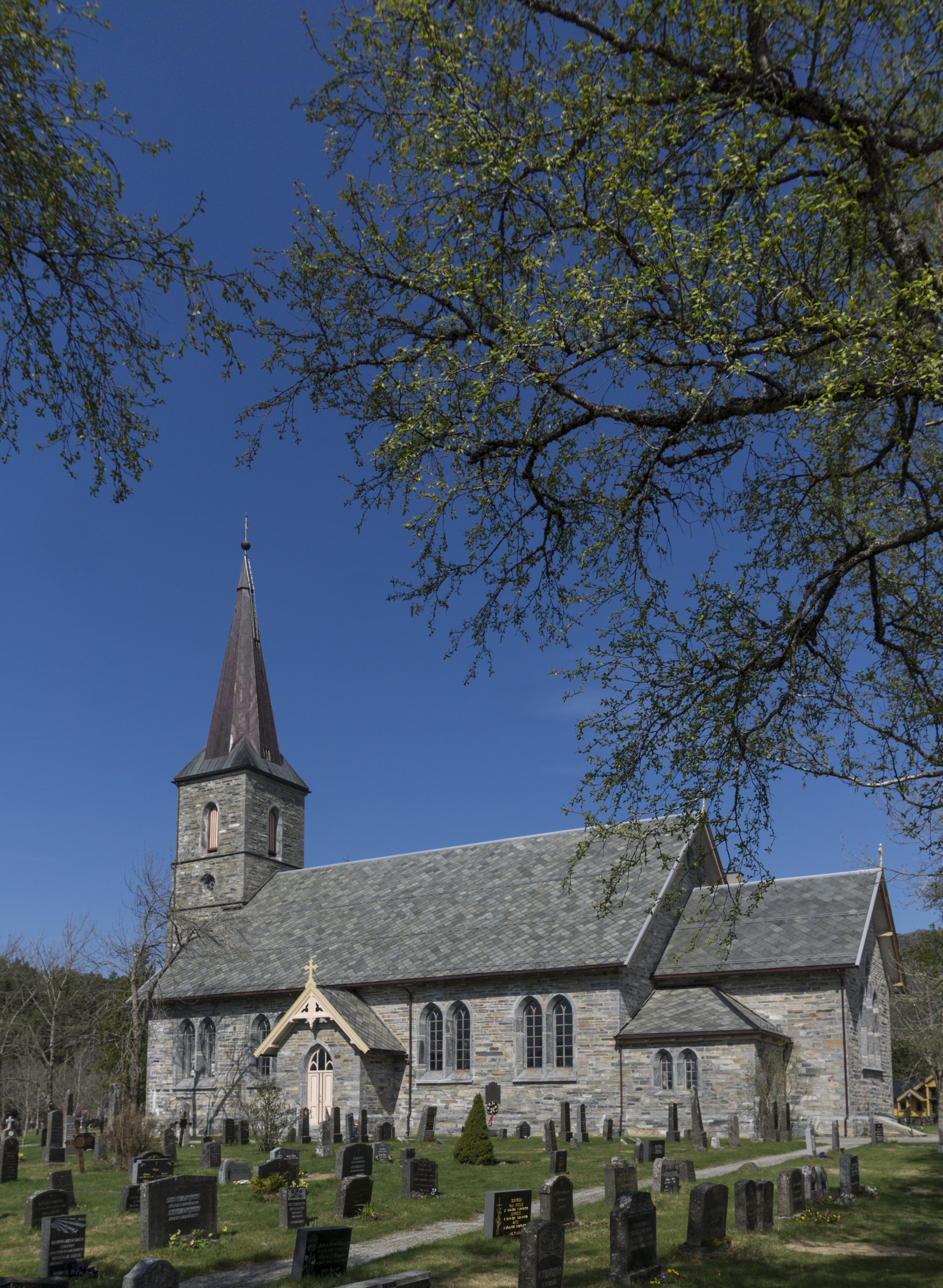
Rissa Church

The church for the Rissa parish was Rein Church for many centuries. In 1888, the parish decided to tear down the old church and to build a new church at Årnset, about 6 kilometres (3.7 mi) northeast of the old church. The new church would be called Rissa Church. This new church was built out of stone and it was consecrated on 26 October 1888. It has an entry porch with a tower on the west end and a choir flanked by two small sacristies on each side on the east end of the building. Later, in 1931, a new Rein Church was built on the site of the old church.

== See also ==
- List of churches in Nidaros
