= Flakk–Rørvik Ferry =

Ferry route in Trøndelag, Norway

Coordinates: 63°28′40″N 10°10′33″E

Flakk–Rørvik
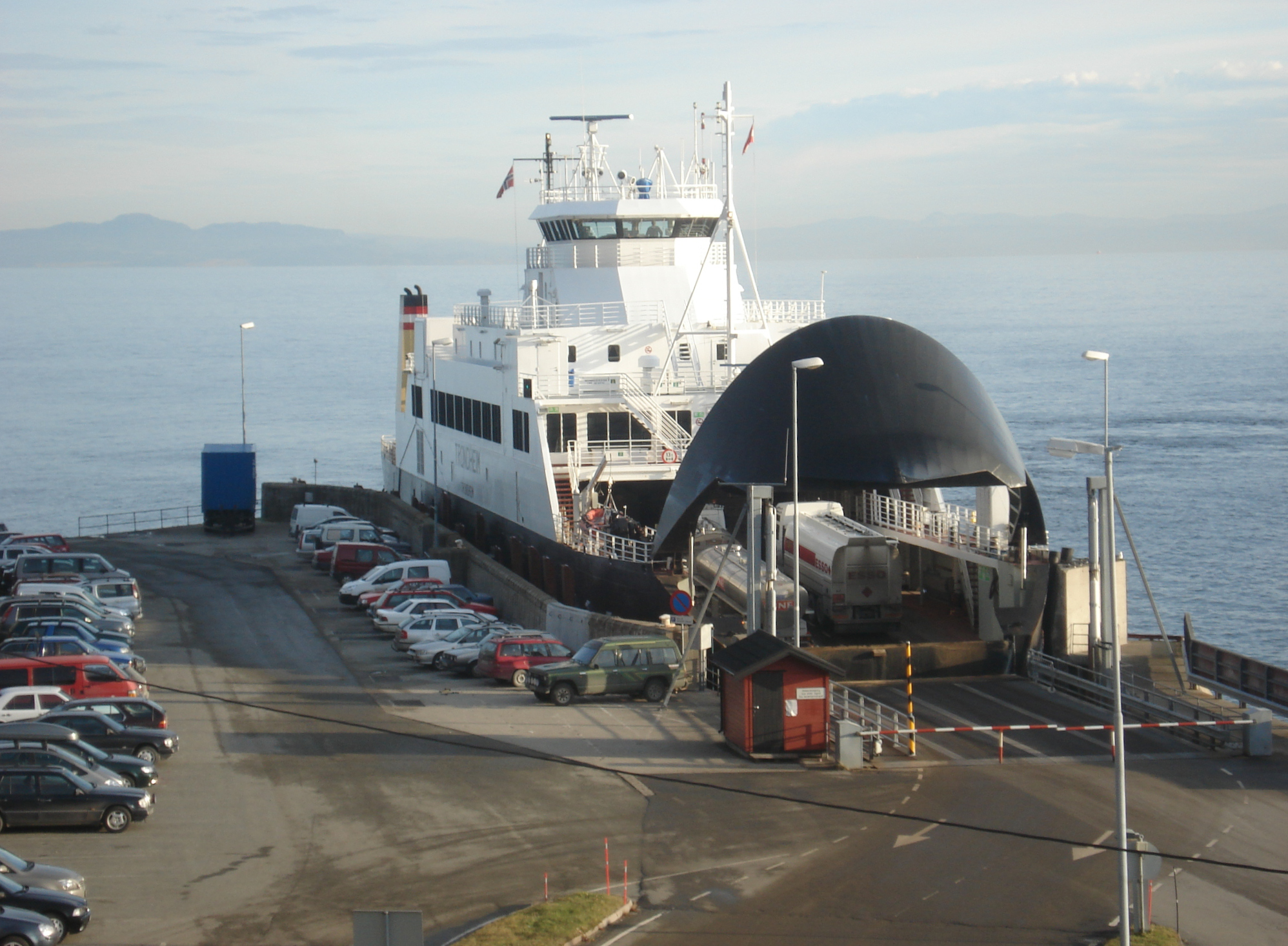
- Ferry at Rørvik
- Waterway: Trondheimsfjorden
- Transit type: Double-ended
- Route: Fv715
- Carries: Automobiles and passengers
- Terminals: Flakk; Rørvik
- Operator: Fosen Trafikklag
- Authority: Norwegian Public Roads Administration
- Began operation: 1978
- Predecessor: Skansen–Vanvikan Ferry
- Travel time: 25 min
- Frequency: 32 / day
- No. of vessels: MF Lagatun, MF Munken, MF Trondheim
- Daily vehicles: 2081 (2007)
- Connections at Flakk
- Bus: Line 450, (Rissa/Råkvåg/Hasselvika - Trondheim S), Line 350 (Osen/Åsen/Åfjord - Trondheim S), Line 75 (Spongdal - Trondheim S), Line 76, (Spongdal -Flakk)
- Road: Fv715 Fv707
- Connections at Rørvik
- Road: Fv715

The Flakk–Rørvik Ferry is an automobile ferry in Trøndelag county, Norway. The line is part of Norwegian County Road 715, which connects the Fosen peninsula with the city of Trondheim. The crossing of Trondheimsfjord is performed with the two - three double-ended ferries; MF Lagatun, MF Munken, which are Hybrid Electric, and MF Trondheim and operated by FosenNamsosSjø, contracted by the Public Transport Operator of Trøndelag, AtB. The Crossing takes 25 Minutes, and has a length of 7.4 kilometres (4.6 mi) running between Rørvik in Indre Fosen Municipality and Flakk in Trondheim Municipality.

== History ==
The ferry line was created in 1978 when it replaced the Skansen–Vanvikan Ferry from 1955, that operated from downtown Trondheim. In 2005, the line was the first ferry to take into use the electronic toll collection system AutoPASS used on most toll roads in Norway.

In 2007, the Norwegian Public Roads Administration has made the line subject to public service obligation (PSO), the first contract to be valid from 1 January 2011 to 31 December 2018 with requirements to operate three liquefied natural gas ferries. Four bids were presented, with subsidy bids ranging from NOK 33–355 million. Fjord1 MRF won the bid at NOK 32 million less than Fosen Trafikklag. In 2016 a new contract was awarded to FosenNamsosSjø by AtB to operate the crossing from 2019.

== Fleet ==
MF Trondheim was launched from Fosen Mekaniske Verksted on 17 December 1992. The 97-metre (318 ft) long ship has a capacity of 124 cars and 315 people.

MF Lagatun was launched from Myklebust Verft in 2018, and is 107,5 metres long and has a capacity of 130 cars and 399 people.

MF Munken, the sister vessel of MF Lagatun was also launched from Myklebust Verft in 2018, and is 107,5 metres long and has a capacity of 130 cars and 399 people.
