= Årnset =

Village in Indre Fosen Municipality, Norway

Årnset Rissa
- Village
- Interactive map of the village
- Coordinates: 63.5903°N 09.9598°E
- Country: Norway
- Region: Central Norway
- County: Trøndelag
- District: Fosen
- Municipality: Indre Fosen

Area
  - Total: 0.87 km^{2} (0.34 sq mi)
- Elevation: 65 m (213 ft)

Population (2024)
  - Total: 1,250
  - Density: 1,437/km^{2} (3,720/sq mi)
- Time zone: UTC+01:00 (CET)
  - Summer (DST): UTC+02:00 (CEST)
- Post Code: 7100 Rissa

Årnset or Rissa is the administrative centre of Indre Fosen Municipality in Trøndelag county, Norway. It is located on the north shore of the lake Botn about 10 kilometres (6.2 mi) south of the village of Hasselvika and about 12 kilometres (7.5 mi) north of the villages of Stadsbygd and Askjem.

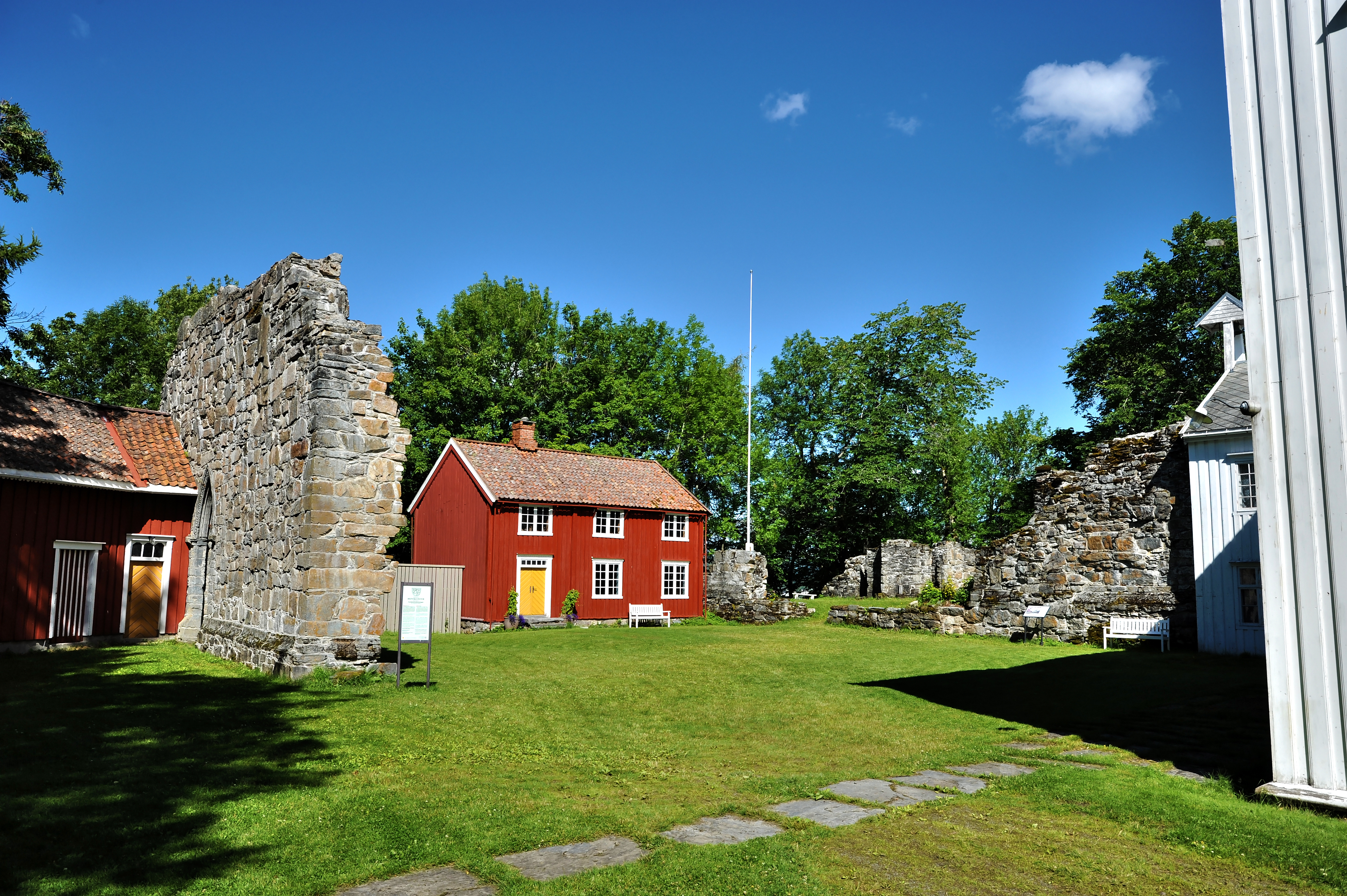
View of the Reins abbey

The 0.87-square-kilometre (210-acre) village has a population (2024) of 1,250 and a population density of 1,437 inhabitants per square kilometre (3,720/sq mi).

Rissa Church, Rein Church, and Rein Abbey are all located in and around Årnset. Prior to 2020, the village was the administrative centre of the old Rissa Municipality (which is why the village is known as Rissa). On 1 January 2020, Rissa Municipality became part of Indre Fosen Municipality, and the village became the administrative centre of the new municipality. The head office of the intermunicipal waste management agency Fosen Renovasjon is situated in Årnset.
