= Fosen =

Geographical area in Trøndelag, Norway

Coordinates: 63°43′N 10°15′E

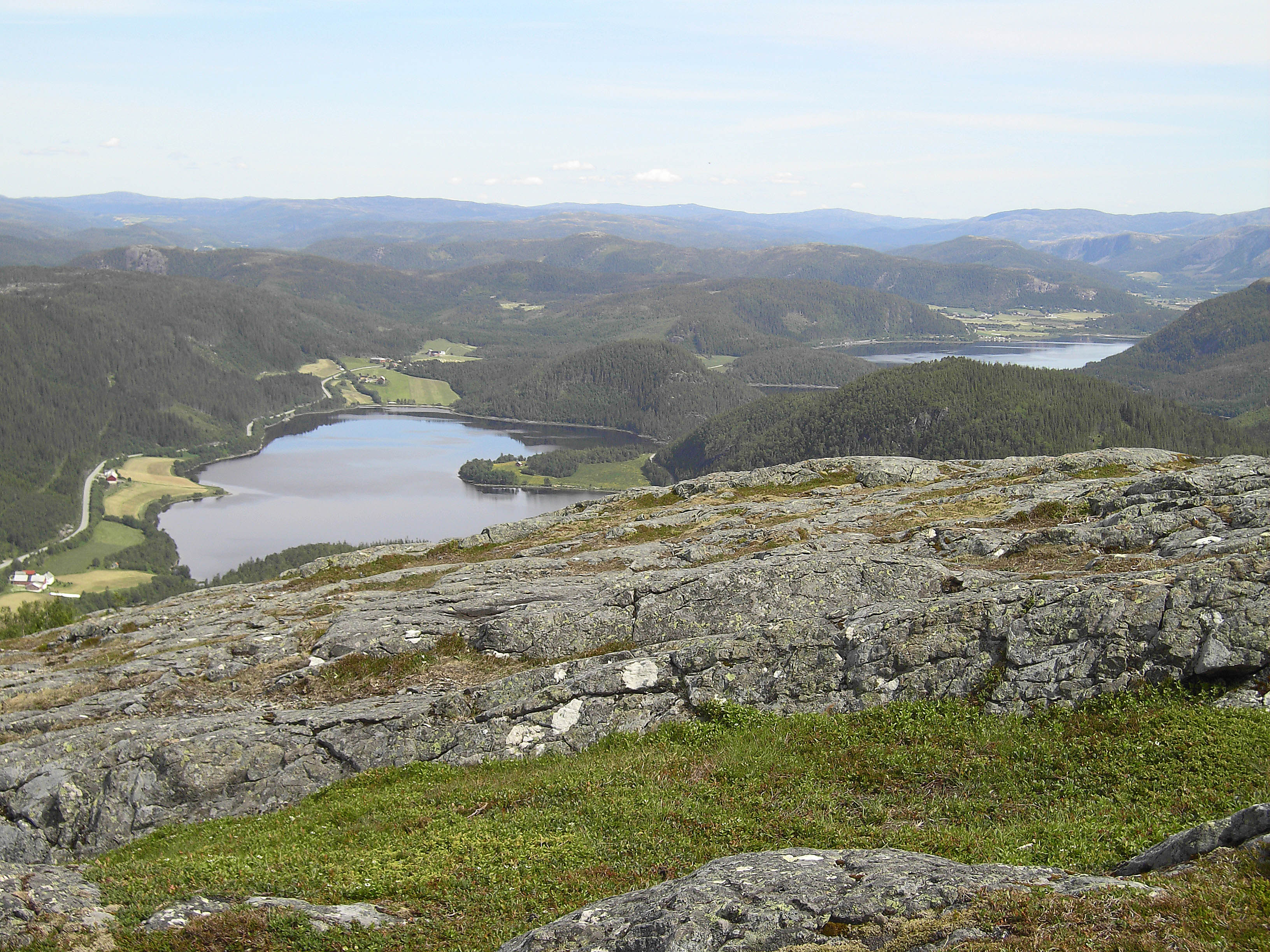
Fosen landscape view; Åfjord.

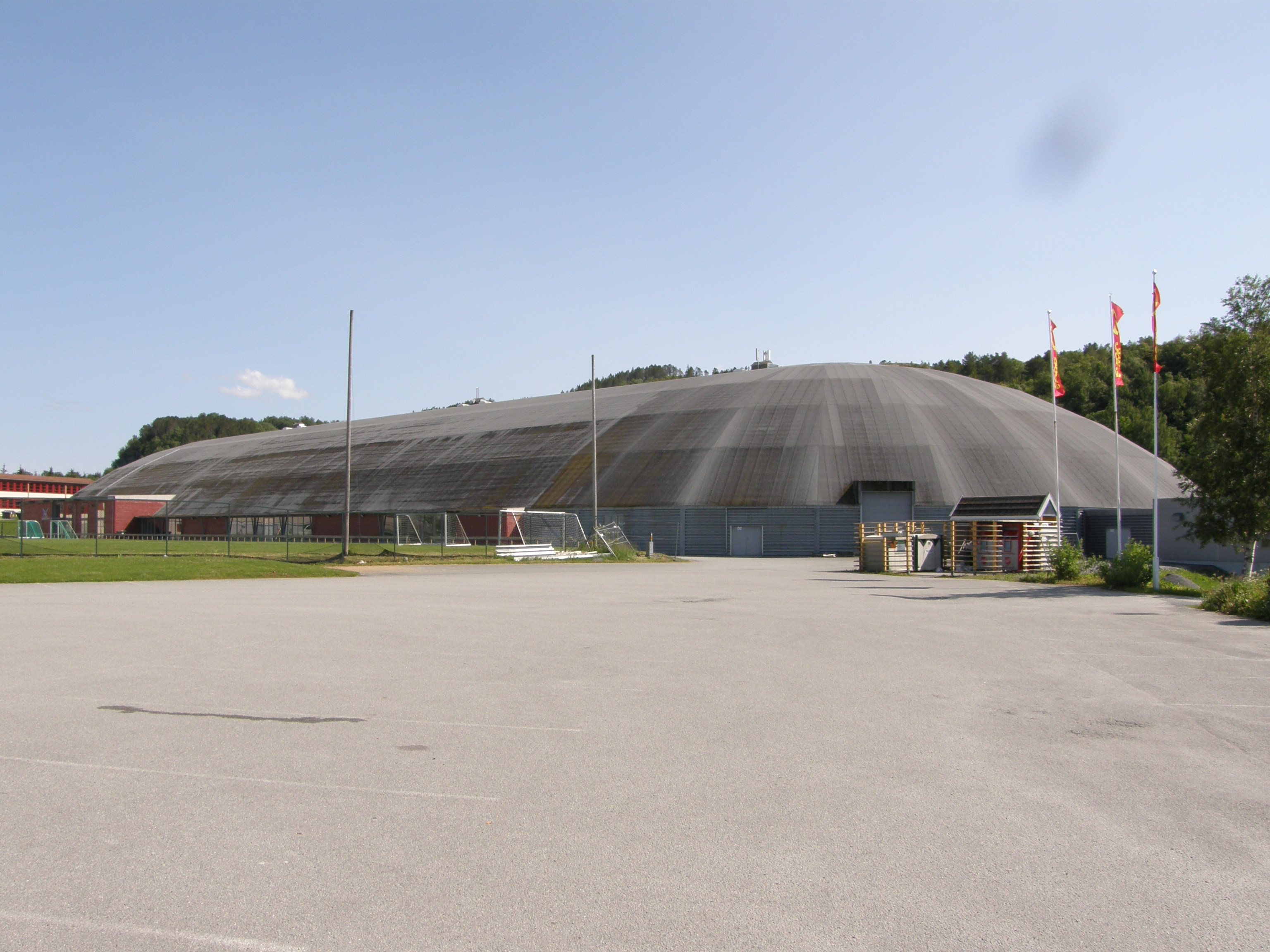
Fosenhallen, indoor speed skating rink in Botngård

Fosen is a traditional district in coastal Trøndelag county, Norway. The district consists of the municipalities Osen, Åfjord, Ørland, Indre Fosen, Orkland, Heim, Hitra, and Frøya. In colloquial speech, Fosen also refers to the Fosen peninsula, (Indre Fosen, Åfjord, and Osen) with the peninsula also having the Southern Sami name Fovsa. In the early 20th century, the region became a site of environmental conflict and activist attention over a wind turbine farm that encroached on reindeer herders of the Sámi people. The Norwegian supreme court ruled in 2021 that the wind farm violated Sámi indigenous rights.

== Geography ==
The district is dominated by forested valleys, lakes, coastal cliffs but also shallow areas, and in the interior mountains reaching up to 675 metres (2,215 ft) in elevation. The western coast has many skerries and some islands, such as Stokkøya in Åfjord. There are some good salmon rivers, and sea eagles and other sea birds are very common along the coast, notably on the shallow area near Ørland (Grandefjæra). The west coast has mild winters, and some locations (just west of the mountains) receive on average more than 2,000 millimetres (79 in) of precipitation per year. Part of the Scandinavian coastal conifer forests (Norwegian: Kystgranskog) are located in the valleys of the peninsula, and smaller areas are classified as temperate rainforest with 67 nature reserves. The largest nature reserve is the 5,316 hectares (20.53 mi^{2}) Øyenskavele, with many nature types including undisturbed forest, some of it classified as rainforest.

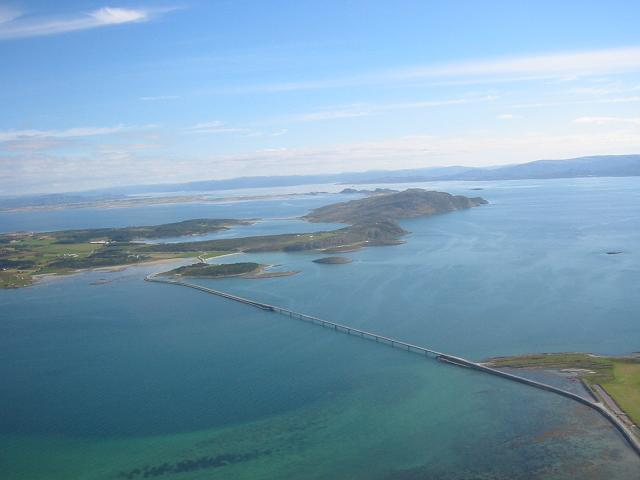
The Kråkvåg bridge connecting the two islands Storfosna and Kråkvåg, Ørland municipality.

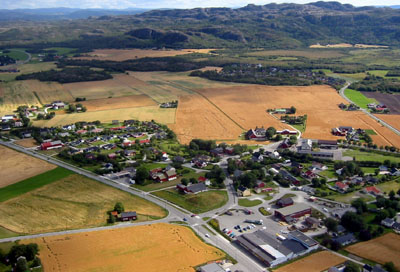
Opphaug in Ørland Municipality is the only area dominated by flat lowland on the peninsula

== Education ==
Fosen also has a folk high school, Fosen Folkehøgskole. It teaches unusual subjects such as sailing and building traditional Norwegian boats (close to Viking ships), organic agriculture, traditional Norwegian arts and crafts, nature life, etc.

== Fosen conflict ==
The Fosen conflict is an ongoing conflict regarding environmentalism. The Supreme Court ruled that two wind turbine parks in Åfjord Municipality, specifically Roan and Storheia, have been built unlawfully. The Supreme Court of Norway ruled in October 2021 that the wind turbine parks violate the indigenous rights of the Sámi people, as the areas form part of official seasonal reindeer herding paths.

The conflict is almost universally referred to as being in the Fosen peninsula as a whole, although only inland central parts of Åfjord contain the involved parks.

=== Protests in Oslo ===
The Fosen Conflict has resulted in civil disobedience; in 2023, Greta Thunberg and others were blocking entrances to government ministries in Oslo; the police moved them out of the way. On March 2, 2023, protesters were blocking entrances to government ministries in Oslo; protesters were arrested, brought to the Oslo central arrest and given a fine.

On March 26, 2023, media said that the plans for protests (as of 2 March 2023) included blocking the entrances to the Royal Palace, Oslo; the Norwegian Police Service found out about the plans, and warned that there would be mass arrests; the three main leaders of the protest had doubts that the protests could be kept non-violent if there were mass arrests. instead the protests made a "symbolic blockade", by only blocking the main access road to the palace, so that the attendees of the March 3 government meeting - had to use one of the back entrances.

On 12 October 2023, Sami activists, Natur og Ungdom, Greta Thunberg and others were protesting in Oslo. By 13 October, protesters had set up 3 tents (Lavvo) on the grounds of the royal palace in Oslo.

=== Protests elsewhere ===
On Svalbard, students at the folk high school protested the visit in March 2023 of prime minister Jonas Gahr Støre; and walls at the school were covered with messages of protest.

As of Q1 2023, the reindeer owners at Fosen are still willing to negotiate a time period in which the wind turbines would be allowed to stay (before being disassembled); a time period of less than 25 years (since construction), is something the reindeer owners are willing to consider.

On 26 June 2023, demonstrators were blocking the roads to the wind turbines at Roan (at Fosen); [the vehicles of] maintenance personnel (for the turbines), are being denied access.

On 6 September 2024, there were protests at Fosen.

=== Legal problems and mediation ===
In October 2023, Økokrim (a prosecuting authority) said that all the police reports against the developers at Fosen, will be considered together; the developers on the mountains Storheia and Roan were reported to police by Motvind Norge, Norges Miljøvernforbund, and the northern group of owners of reindeer herds on Fosen; the police report claims that illegal production of power, and illegal use of land, has happened, in part because the operators of the facilities, do not have the concession permit (konsesjon); the decision regarding if the cases will get passed on to police investigators, do not have a set date; Two municipalities have been reported to the police in regard to receiving stolen goods (money) and money laundering.

On 24 November 2023, mediator Mats Wilhelm Ruland met with the reindeer owners of North Fosen; which representatives of the government were supposed to take part in the meeting of. The lawyer representant for the reindeer owners at North Fosen said before the meeting, that there will be no more mediation after that meeting. As of mid-November 2023, the "southern group" of reindeer owners on the peninsula, are participating in a process of mediation.

=== Political process and visiting the king, and acquittal of protesters ===
In the afternoon of 2 March 2023, the president of the Sami Parliament (Norway) and the Minister of Energy had a meeting; they held a press conference, following the meeting; the minister said that he apologised on behalf of the Norwegian government for the violation of human rights, that had happened, in regard to [the decisions resulting from the case work,] konsesjonsvedtakene. The same afternoon, Jonas Gahr Støre wrote that today the government is apologising to the Sami practitioners at Fosen of reindeer husbandry (reindriftsamene), for the violations of their human rights, because of the significant negative impact on those practitioners' opportunities to practice their culture. In the evening, the prime minister met (in a church), with some of the young[er] protesters. Later that evening, the spokeswoman for the attending protesters Elle Nystad, said that there are "demands of ours" that must be fulfilled immediately; furthermore, a final decision has to be made, and "our demand" is that the wind turbines (at Fosen) be dismantled, and [the use of] the land, returned to the Sami at Fosen, she said.

The prime minister invited the Sami practitioners (at Fosen) of reindeer husbandry, for a breakfast the following morning on 3 March; practitioners (from Fosen), the prime minister, and a few other politicians had a breakfast meeting at the Office of the Prime Minister). Around 15 minutes after the end of the breakfast meeting, one of the leading protesters, called off the 8-day long protest; however, [a few hundred people,] activists [and supporters] gathered at "royal palace's square" for a sit-in. On 3 March, the prime minister admitted that a violation of human rights, is going on. On 9 March, during the prime minister's visit to the Sami Parliament (in Norway), the prime minister said that he will take the Fosen Conflict seriously, (moving) forward.

Later that day, media said that "Fosen protesters" have been formally invited to be received inside the royal palace to King Harald V; the reception happened on 16 October 2023, and Haakon, Crown Prince of Norway was present (alongside the king).

In December 2024, a trial of 13 protesters was going on in an appellate court. In January 2025, an appellate court acquitted 13 protesters. However, the government sent the case to the supreme court, in February 2025. In April 2025, media said that there will be a trial in the supreme court; the prosecutor has not yet been informed about the trial dates, but the court can even choose to not send the case to trial. On June 27, 2025, media said that the protesters that were previously fined, were acquitted by the supreme court. Earlier (June 19, 2025), the supreme court heard the case; a verdict might be handed down c. three weeks later.

Reactions to the Fosen conflict, include an article in Dagsavisen (October 2023), which suggested that Norway has changed radically if the Cabinet is able to decide that grand political projects, trump [decisions from] the Supreme Court. Later that month, two researchers from the University of Oslo (both of them scholarship stipend recipients), said in an article on NRK.no, that the (Norwegian) authorities are "permitting a subversion of [our] society [, a society] based on" laws and rules.

During protest rallies in 2023, many demonstrators are wearing Gákti; however, those clothes are often being worn inside-out (while the Fosen conflict has been escalating since 2023's first quarter). That act has a symbolic meaning in more than one context: something is (very) wrong.

== Transport ==
The peninsula has one airport, Ørland Airport, which does not handle international flights as of 30 January 2024.

Commuter ferries sail from Trondheim to Brekstad and Vanvikan daily.

== The name ==
The district is named after the island Storfosna ('Big Fosen') in Ørland Municipality. The Old Norse form of the name was Fólgsn. For the meaning see Kristiansund.

== See also ==
- Fosenlinjen
