= Nidaros Cathedral West Front =

Final portion of the Nidaros Cathedral in Trondheim, Norway

Coordinates: 63°25′37″N 10°23′45″E

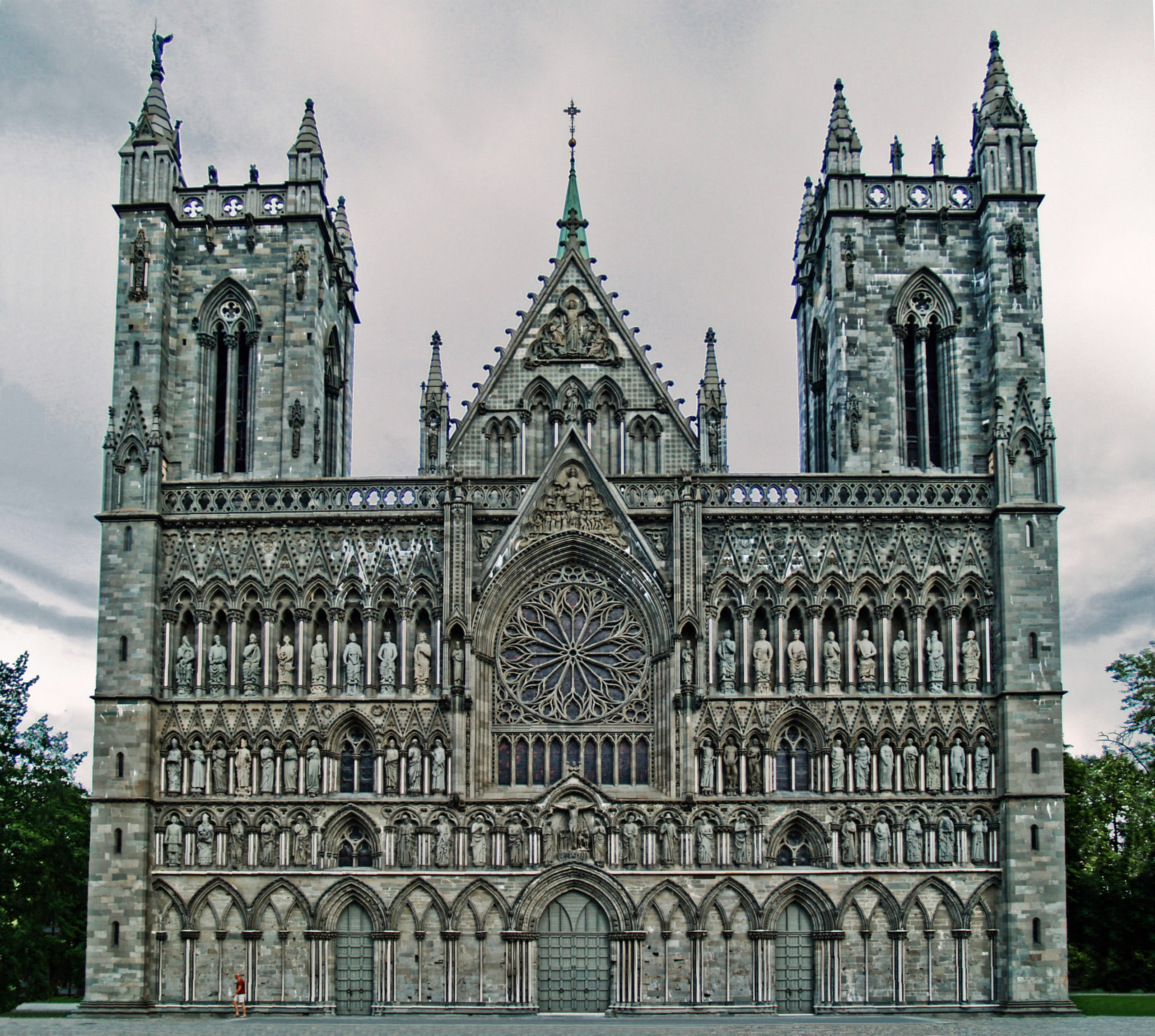
Nidaros Cathedral West Front.

The Nidaros Cathedral West Front (Norwegian: Nidarosdomens Vestfront), which includes multiple sculptures, was the final portion of the Nidaros Cathedral in Trondheim, Norway that was restored. Nidaros Cathedral is the world's northernmost medieval cathedral and Norway's national sanctuary. The West Front is the cathedral's main façade and one of the most beautiful and ornate portions of the church. The restoration of the West Front took from 1905 to 1983 and was worked on by a large number of sculptors. In 1869, the Nidaros Cathedral Restoration Workshop was founded with the purpose of restoring the Cathedral, and celebrated a 150 years Anniversary in 2019.

A picture of the West Front from 1661 shows extensive deterioration, with only the bottom sections left standing. Only five statues from the Middle Ages have survived. The restoration of the West Front took from 1905 to 1983 and was worked on by a large number of sculptors.

The largest church bell in Norway hangs in the West Front's north tower. Installed in 1964, it weighs 2,400 kilograms (5,300 lb), and people say that it can be heard in Melhus Municipality, about 30 kilometres (19 mi) away, when the wind is in the right direction. The church has three bells. The 'Great Bell' is the oldest and was cast in Hoorn in the Netherlands in 1751.

This part of the church is also the most recent of the original cathedral constructions; archbishop Sigurd Eindrideson laid the cornerstone for the west front in 1248. The construction was not yet complete when the church was burnt in 1328. The original design for the west face is not known, but one can assume that it was never built to those original plans; it is reasonable to assume that a screen front similar to that used elsewhere was planned on the west. Screen fronts were often rectangular and served as a cover to conceal the rest of the church. English cathedrals from the same period, among others Lincoln Cathedral, Wells Cathedral and Salisbury Cathedral, had similar fronts. The west front had three entrances and is flanked by two smaller towers on each side of the façade.

== Reconstruction ==
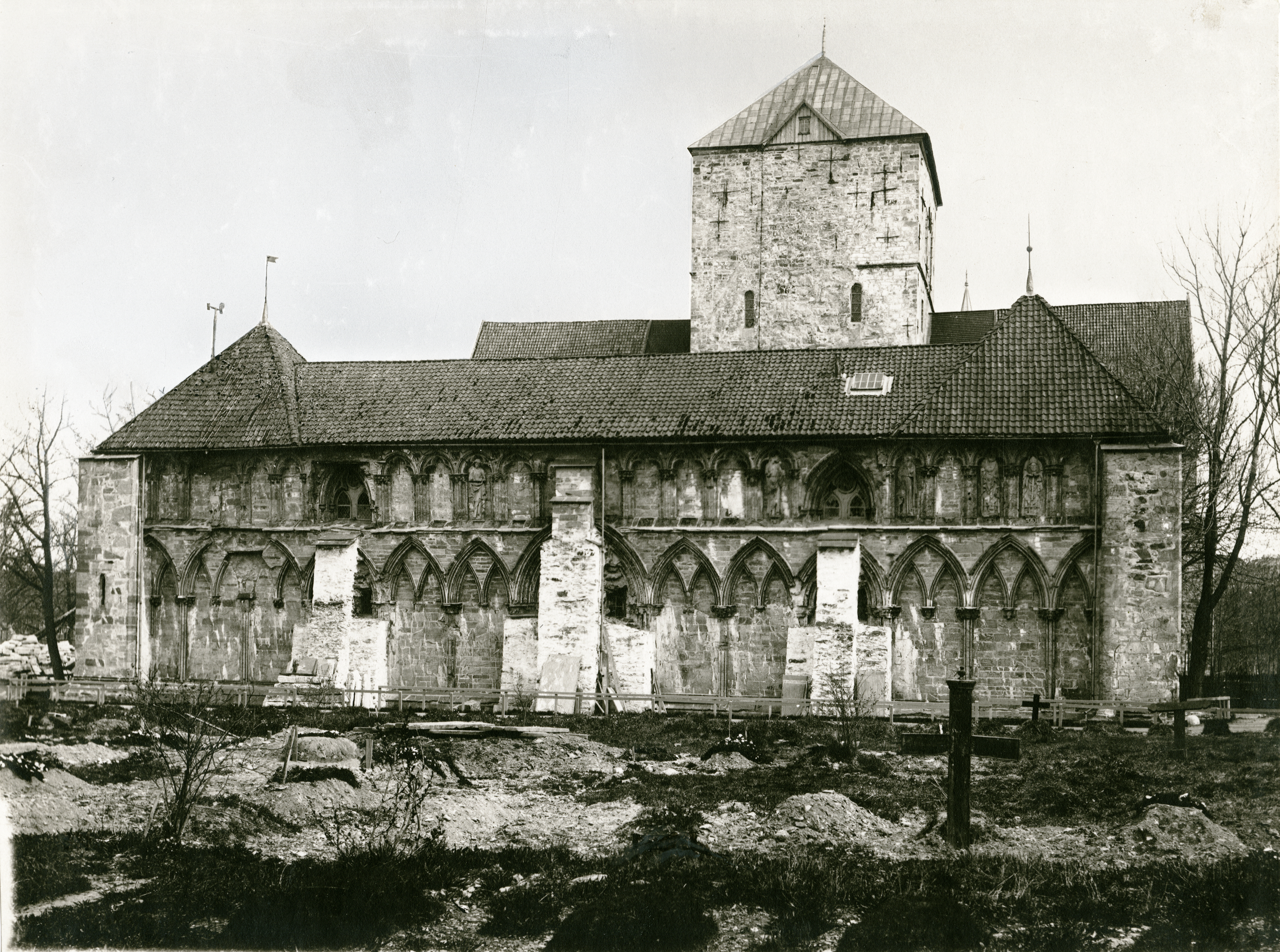
The West Front in the late 19th century

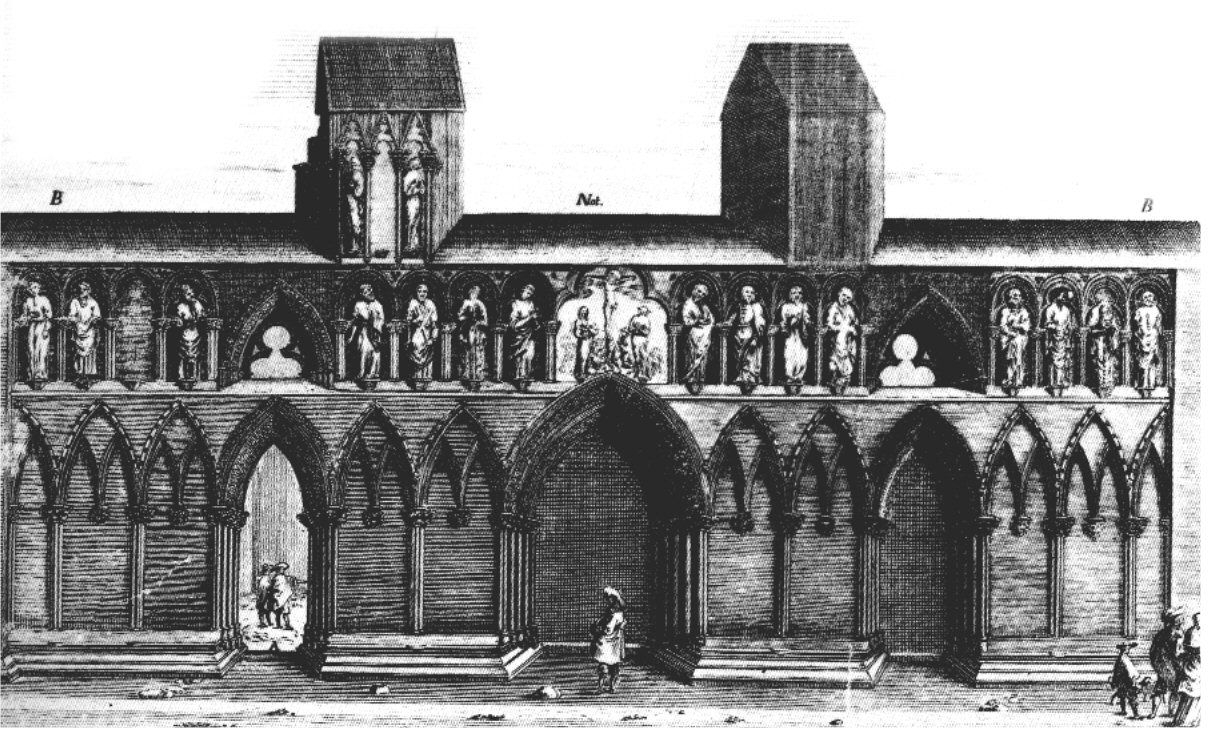
Maschius' print from 1661.

Of the overall Nidaros Cathedral restoration, reconstruction of the west front stirred the most debate. The Nidaros Cathedral had not been well maintained and the west front was among the most deteriorated parts of the church in 1869. The difficulty in restoration was exacerbated by the fact that it was the portion of the church which was the most complex, least well documented, and most difficult to reconstruct. The initial condition was so bad that many professionals opposed any attempt to restore without major reconstruction.

There is limited documentation of the west front, as it was rebuilt after the fire in the 1328 and later fires. The oldest known depiction of the west front is a print prepared by Jacob Mortensson Maschius (~1630–78) from 1661, which shows two full floors and part of the third floor. Evidence indicates that there was a window on the third floor, as in Lincoln Cathedral. Here it is inset a curved tip rose window in Gothic style. Written sources document that Nidaros Cathedral had such a rose window:

... therefore haffuer and King Oluff Kyrre directed construction of a stately rose window in gable at the cathedral, which haffuer faithfully gilded with the best gold.

Absalon Pederssøn Beyer (1528–75) recorded around 1560. Gunnar Danbolt (1940–) citing a different source from 1500 in his book Nidarosdomen, fra Kristkirke til nasjonalmonument (Nidarosdomen, from Christian church to national monument) published in 1997, quoted:

......in the church gable there is a large rose formed of stone, which was gold gilded, and inset within the center was a large red stone, set such that as the sun shone there, one could not fasten eyes thereupon for the glory which there shone.

There is such a "karfunkelsten" or carbuncle (an older term for any red-precious stones) in the center of the rose window today; it traditionally symbolizes Christ.

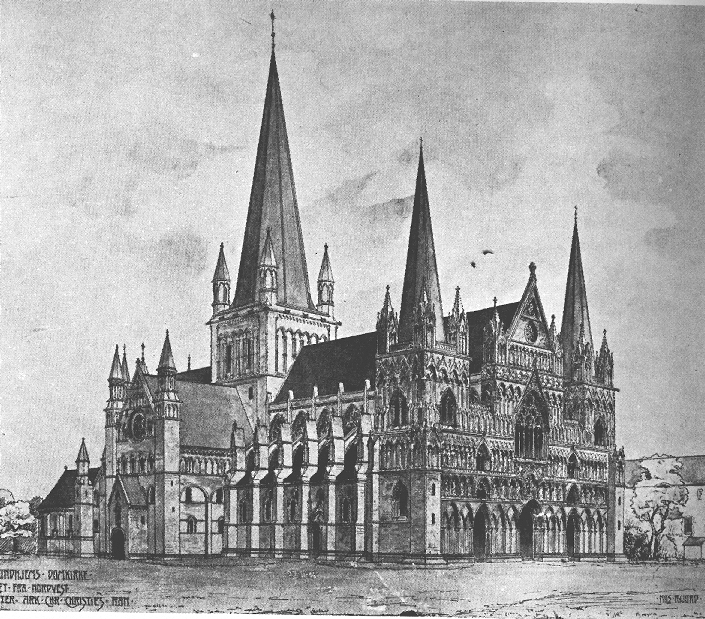
Proposal by Nils Ryjord 1907.

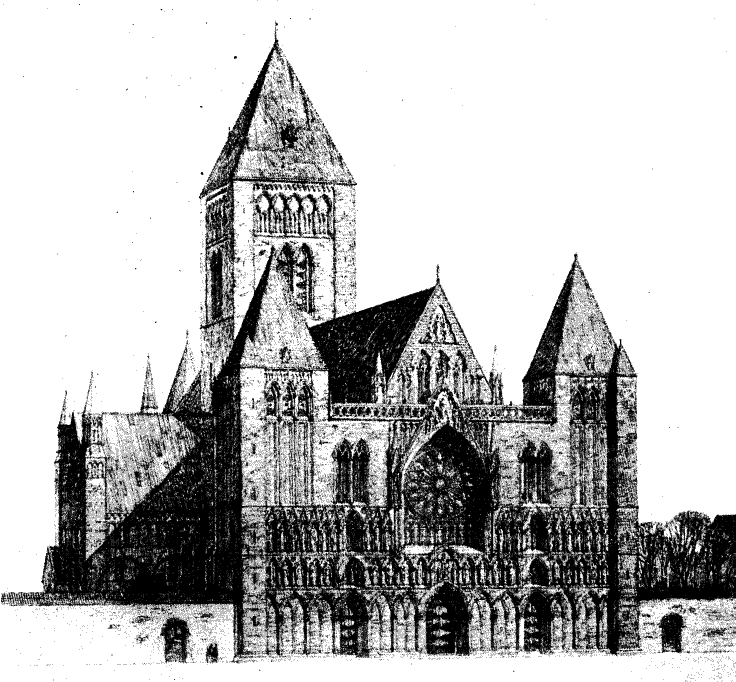
Nordhagen's proposal from 1916.

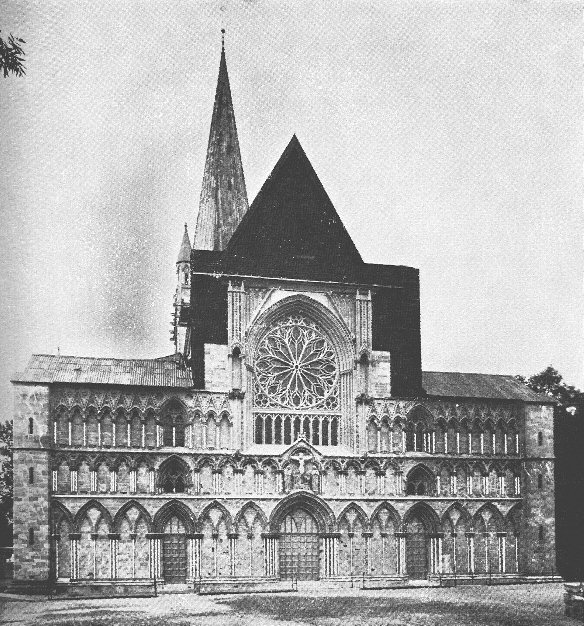
The west face undergoing restoration in 1930.

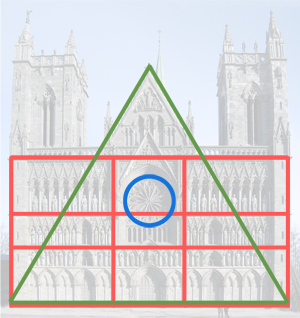
The geometry of the west front..

=== Architect Christian Christie ===
Since there was limited documentation on the original west front layout, there was an extensive discussion of what was appropriate for the restoration in 1903. The cathedral architect, Christian Christie was uncertain whether the Gothic style or a practical, functional structure was preferable. In his sketch of 1903 the west face did not include a rose window, for which he was subjected to criticism.

The restoration of the west front did not begin before his death in 1906. Nils Ryjord took over temporarily after Christie's death.

=== Architect Olaf Nordhagen ===
After Christies death, an architectural competition was held for design of the west front, and the shared first prize went to Olaf Nordhagen and Henrik Bull. In 1909 Nordhagen was employed, and his sketch of the west front prepared in 1913, which contained the front screen, rose window and side tower, was approved by the Norwegian Parliament. However, in 1915 he made radical changes in the drawings, while the historian Macody Lund proposed a completely different configuration for the west face and west gable, based on the golden ratio. This conflict of views led to significant delays in the restoration, culminating in convening an international expert commission, which rejected Macody Lunds proposed approach in 1923. In 1930, five years after Nordhagen's death, only the first three floors and the rose window completed.

=== Architect Helge Thiis ===
In 1929, a new architectural competition was held, and the proposal that won, Kongespeilet was prepared by Helge Thiis. This started the last phase in the restoration of the west front. Thiis was appointed as the cathedral architect, a position he held from 1930 until his death in 1972. He believed that the work on the west front was essentially an artistic exercise in the spirit and form of Gothic architecture and of the Church as a whole, than a reconstruction. His work has much in common with Nordhagen's approved sketch, and represents the west front as it appears today.

== Construction ==
This concluded that the front should be built following a rhythmic proportional system: "The seated statues have the same height as the first pictorial series, the deep niches as second pictorial series, and in height from cornice band under the royal floor up to the tip of the arch is equal to twice the lower height." The rectangular screen fronts baseline dimensions are based on the principle of the golden ratio. The two columns on each side of the rose window are placed according to this principle, the same is the position of the horizontal delineations between the second and third and between the third and fourth alcove openings. These lines are most clearly visible on the side towers.

The rectangular baseline also provides the baseline of an equilateral triangle with a vertex in the west gable front, which was completed in 1963. The rose window forms a circle in the triangle. A circle in an equilateral triangle is often regarded as the symbol for "God's eye."

== The rose window ==
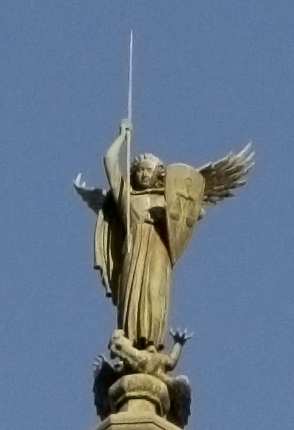
The archangel Michael

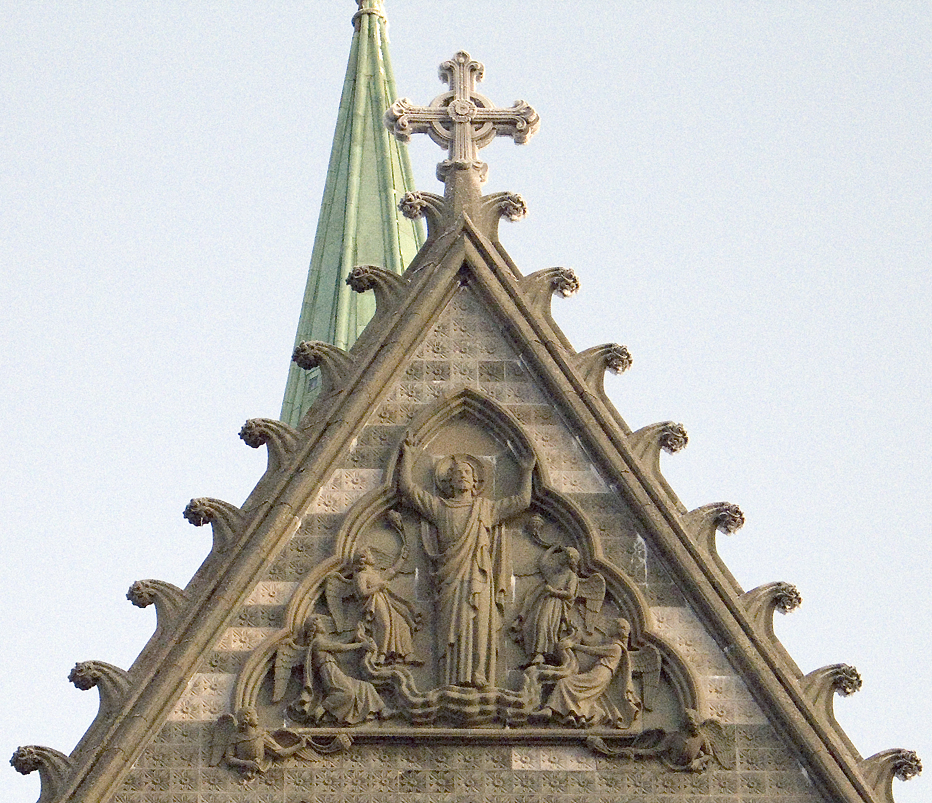
The relief Kristus i triumf (Christ triumphant) on the gable of the west face.

None of the Nidaros Cathedral's original stained glass windows were intact when the restoration work started in 1869. The concept followed was to reconstruct the church in the Gothic style, and as a result the new stained glass windows should also have standard medieval themes. In 1907 the architect Gabriel Kielland (1871–1960) won a competition for new paintings for Nidaros Cathedral's southern gable. In addition Kielland delivered proposals to all of the church windows, and received the commission to create the stained glass windows. The paintings are iconographic imagery which were produced in collaboration with Oluf Kolsrud (1885–1945), professor of church history. The themes are from the Bible stories and Saint's legends, the windows on the north side of the church have a blue background and shows predominantly scenes from the Old Testament, the windows on the south side of the church have a red background and shows a corresponding predominance of scenes of the New Testament, while the rose window motif that faces the sunset (west), symbolizes doomsday. The rose window's structural layout followed the design by cathedral architect Olaf Nordhagen, and the diameter is built up around an eightfold symmetry with the innermost parts proportioned such that the diameter is formed of 16 sheets.

The window expresses how things move outward from Christ and converge back to him by doomsday. In the middle is a red gem, which symbolizes Christ. The rays outward represent yellow flames in a blue background. Angels are located at the end of each flame; those on the upper half are singing and playing while those on the lower half are six winged. In the outermost ring are the angels of the judgment. Between the angels of judgment are the symbols for the four Evangelists. In the upper left is the Matthew the Evangelist as an angel with a written scroll. In the upper right is John the Evangelist represented as an eagle. In the bottom right is Luke the Evangelist as an ox. In the bottom left is Mark the Evangelist as a lion. The painted glass in the window consists of over 10,000 pieces. The rose window was presented as a gift from the women of Norway for St. Olav's anniversary in 1930, it was completed the same year and is regarded as Kielland's masterpiece.

== Sculptures ==
The sculptures on the west front are partially based on Maschius' drawings, on guesswork and on pure fantasy. Originally, the wall was framed with two side towers, and had a series of sculptures. The few of them that survived clearly show a French influence, particularly traceable to the cathedral in Reims. It is unknown how many rows of sculptures there originally were – only the bottom row survived the fires and decay of the late Middle Ages; the five remaining sculptures are in poor condition. These sculptures are now in the museum in the Archbishop's Palace. Work on the sculptures started in 1929. The sculptures depict both biblical and historical characters.

The two lower rows of sculpture, proposed by Professor Oluf Kolsrud in 1928, are based on the engraving by Jacob Maschius. Kolsrud was an historical adviser on the church's restoration, and prepared an iconography for the sculptures. His proposal to place statues on the "royal floor" – although without evidence of historical precedent – was approved in 1935. It was assumed that the medieval sculptures were based on living models, and to a large extent, this concept is applied to the new sculptures. Thus the sculpture of Bishop Sigurd borrowed features from the poet Aasmund Olavsson Vinje, and Kristofer Leirdal's statue of the Archangel Michael on the top of the northwest tower was based, according to the sculptor, on the face of Bob Dylan – inspired by Dylan's opposition to the Vietnam War.

Above the row of kings, on top of each column that separates the niches containing sculptures of kings and prophets of the Old Testament, there are smaller sculptures that symbolize the twelve months in a year. These small sculptures, Gothic in style, were modeled by Odd Hilt in 1937–1938 and represent different tasks appropriate to the corresponding month of the year. Only one of them, the September sculpture representing the apple harvest, is female. Similar figures appropriate to the months can be found in several major European cathedrals dating from the Middle Ages, especially those in France.

The central axis of the west front is dominated by Jesus Christ, to whom the Nidaros Cathedral is dedicated. Christ comprises the stem of a tree, and the rows of sculptures represent branches of the tree. At the bottom of the middle axis lies a sculpted group of motifs from the crucifixion - the crucified Christ is based on a model by Wilhelm Rasmussen. Above the rose window is a relief with the same theme as the window's subject – doomsday – with Christ sitting in judgment; the relief was designed by Stinius Fredriksen. At the top of the west gable is a relief with Christ triumphant - the transfigured Christ, designed by Kristofer Leirdalen. Danbolt discusses these sculptures in his works about Nidarosdomen, noting that:

The crucifixion represents the possibility of salvation. In the doomsday sequence it is clear how this possibility is developed. And Christ triumphant draws our attention upward to the sky, which again represents realizing the possibility of salvation. This illustrates the second article of the Christian declaration of faith, "Christ has risen."

The sculptures spread from the center span toward each side. The top row contains the images of Christ's spiritual and physical ancestors. The middle row shows the Expulsion from Paradise and the Annunciation, on opposite sides of the rosette, as well as the Norwegian saints and their virtues. The bottom row of sculptures shows the Apostles, along with Saints and Kings who spread Christianity throughout Europe.

Additionally, the western façade is replete with lesser sculptures, masks, angels, gargoyles, and a large collection of fauna: bears, donkeys, elephants, cocks and bees. This wealth of sculpture is intended to represent the divine work of God's creation. In addition, there are reliefs, ornaments, arches and columns topped by ornate, richly carved capitals. Helge Thiis said that "no human eye can apprehend from the ground all the rich details contained in this Church".

Many of Norway's leading sculptors joined in creating the western façade, working for several decades. These include Gustav Vigeland (1869–1943), Wilhelm Rasmussen (1879–1965), Dyre Vaa (1903–1980), Stinius Fredriksen (1902–1977), Nic Schiøll (1901–1984), Arne Kvibergskaar, Odd Hilt (1915–1986), Knut Skinnarland (1909–1993), Tone Thiis Schjetne (1928–2010), Sivert Donali (1931-), Kristofer Leirdal (1915–2010), Arnold Haukeland (1920–1983), Anne Raknes (1914–2001), Helge Thiis and August Albertsen.

=== Details of sculptures ===
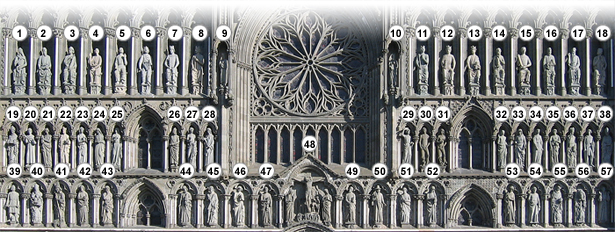
Portion of the west face illustrating the 3 tiers of statues.

==== Top row: kings and prophets of the Old Testament ====
The kings and prophets from the kingdom of Judah who prophesied the coming of the Christ - Christ's spiritual and physical ancestors. The series includes five prophets and three kings on each side. In addition, John the Baptist and Moses are found in the smaller niches on each side of the rose window.

1. Patriarch Abraham

2. Prophet Samuel

3. Prophet Isaiah

1. Patriarch Abraham
Abraham was a descendant of Noah, and the sacrifice of his son Isaac is seen in Christian theology as a forerunner of Christ's sacrifice. The sculpture was shaped by Knut Skinnarland and sculpted by Steffen Krogstad and shows Abraham lifting a knife against Isaac. The motif on the shelf shows the sheep, which was eventually accepted as a substitute for a human offering.

2. Prophet Samuel
Samuel was the first and one of the most important prophets mentioned in the Bible. It was he who anointed David as King of Israel. The sculpture of Samuel, modeled by Kristofer Leirdal, shows a knife in his right hand and a lamb to be sacrificed on the left. It was sculpted by Leirdal together with Josef Ankile.

3. Prophet Isaiah
Isaiah was a prophet who lived during the times of the kings Uzziah Jotham Ahaz and Hezekiah. It is based on a model by Stinius Fredriksen, and carries a twig in each hand, a symbol of the prophecies of the Book of Isaiah, which marks the coming of the Messiah as a descendant of a branch of the family of King David. Steffen Krogstad was responsible for carving the image.

4. Prophet Ezekiel
Ezekiel is one of the four great biblical prophets. He was imprisoned in Babylon and was considered a great mystic and seer. The image depicts the prophet with two wheels in hand, intertwined with each other, a motif from the Book of Ezekiel. It was designed by Tone Thiis Schjetne and carved by Gunnar Sundet.

5. Prophet Jonah
The Book of Jonah tells that Jonah defied the word of God and was punished by being swallowed by a whale, where he lived for three days and three nights. His experience is seen as a foreshadowing of the death and resurrection of Jesus. The sculpture is a design of Odd Hilt, and carved by Per Jensen and Erling Ola Moumen Nygård in 1982. At the base a whale is represented.

6. King David
King David is one of the main characters of the Old Testament and in the Christian tradition, an ancestor of Jesus. Kristofer Leirdal designed his image with a harp in his hands to symbolize his interest in music. At the base there is a temple with the Lion of Judah at the entry. The piece was sculpted by Gunnar Sundet between 1973 and 1976.

4. Prophet Ezekiel

5. Prophet Jonah

6. King David

7. King Jehoshaphat

8. King Hezekiah

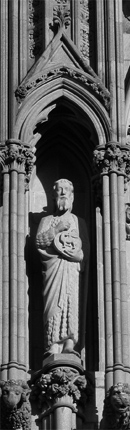
9. John the Baptist

7. King Jehoshaphat
Jehoshaphat was a king of Judah and one of the ancestors of Jesus mentioned in the Gospel of Matthew. Jehoshaphat, who holds a scepter, was modeled by Kristofer Leirdalen and hewn by Bård Sagfjæra,

8. King Hezekiah
Hezekiah has been judged as one of the most prominent kings of Judah. In his hands he holds a scepter, and his foot is an image based on the Second Book of Kings 19:35, where Hezekiah, aided by God, defended his kingdom against the Assyrian's: And it came to pass that night, that the angel of the LORD went forth, and smote in the camp of the Assyrians a hundred fourscore and five thousand; and when men arose early in the morning, behold, they were all dead corpses. The statue was designed by Knut Skinnarland and the sculpture is the work of Ola Moum.

9. John the Baptist
John the Baptist prophesied the coming of the Messiah. His statue, based on a model by Knut Skinnarland, show him wearing a camelhair cloak and holding to his chest Agnus Dei, the Lamb of God, symbolizing Jesus' shedding of his blood to take away the sins of the world (Cf. John 1:29). Gunnar Sundet carved this statue.

10. Moses
Moses is a Biblical Hebrew religious leader, lawgiver, and prophet, to whom the authorship of the Pentateuch is traditionally attributed. He is modeled holding the stone tablets containing the Decalogue, given to Moses on Mount Sinai (Exodus 19:23) in his hands. The model is the work of Arnold Haukeland, and the statue is carved by Axel Rönninge.

11. King Josiah
Josiah was king of Judah and is remembered for having driven all traces of idolatry from the kingdom. He reintroduced the Passover celebration after many years of absence. The statue was modeled by Knut Skinnarland and carved by Per Jensen. At the base the slaughter of the lamb for the Passover holiday is shown.

12. King Azariah
Azariah was one of the most prominent kings of Judah, both politically and militarily. In the right hand he holds a defensive tower, which symbolizes the defense of Jerusalem. The statue was created by Sivert Donali, and is modeled on the appearance of Gerhard Fischer, an archaeologist who performed research at the Nidaros Cathedral for several years. At the base there are women in labor, which represents the work of Fischer's wife, Dorothea Fischer, at the cathedral, since her husband suffered from acrophobia. Axel Rönninge was responsible for sculpting the work.

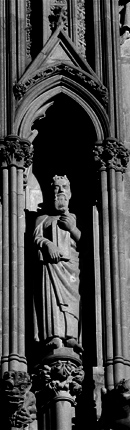
10. Moses

11. King Josiah

12. King Azariah

13. King Solomon

14. Prophet Zechariah

15. Prophet Daniel

13. King Solomon
King Solomon, was a ruler of Israel and son of King David who was considered a very wise man; kings and queens came from around the world to hear his counsel. In the image he holds a temple, an allusion to his construction of the Temple of Jerusalem. At the base there is a scene of the famous Solomon trial, with two women claiming motherhood of single child. It is based on a model by Stinius Fredriksen and carved by Steffen Krogstad.

14.Prophet Zechariah
Zechariah was one of the twelve minor prophets of the Bible. After the exile in Babylon he was a driving force behind the reconstruction of the Temple of Jerusalem, which is why his statue has a temple at the base. He too prophesied the coming of the Messiah, poor and riding on the back of a donkey. The image of the prophet holds "the stone with the seven eyes". Sivert Donali is responsible for the model and the carving was the work of Jan Ankile.

15. Prophet Daniel
Daniel was a prominent prophet. and interpreter of dreams in Babylon. He prophesied the Messiah's kingdom and his victory over the kingdoms of the earth. His image, by Odd Hilt, was designed showing parchment in his hand, while the base represents Daniel in the lions den. It was carved by Rolf Johansen.

16. Prophet Jeremiah
Jeremiah suffered greatly as a result of his prophecies about the downfall of Jerusalem and his suffering is viewed as a foreshadowing of the torment of Jesus. He lived at the time when the Temple of Solomon was destroyed and Judea fell into the hands of Babylon. The sculpture represents him holding a cross with halo before his breast — a symbol of Jesus Christ. At the base the scene showing his stoning can be found. The sculpture was based on a model by Sivert Donali as sculpted by Ola Moumen.

17. Prophet Elijah
The prophet Elijah is one of the more notable prophets. remembered for having ascended into heaven aboard a chariot of fire pulled by horses of fire in a whirlwind. This is seen as foreshadowing the Ascension of Christ. That scene appears on the pedestal upon which the statue rests. It is based on a design by Fredriksen Stinius as carved by Per Jensen.

18. Patriarch Jacob
Jacob was the son of Rebecca and Isaac and the twin brother of Esau. His hands hold the ladder that appeared in his dream, which rose to heaven and upon which the angels ascended and descended, a common biblical theme in the Middle Ages. Jacob, blind and on his deathbed, blessed Efraim before his elder brother, Manasseh; giving Efraim rank over Manasseh, by placing his hands in the form of a cross during the blessing. This was interpreted to mean that Jesus at the cross would replace the sinful people with a new people of God. The base shows the scene of the struggle between Jacob and an angel. The image was shaped by Sivert Donali and carved by Gunnar Sundet.

16. Prophet Jeremiah

17. Prophet Elijah

18. Patriarch Jacob

==== Middle row: Norwegian Saints to the left side ====
19. Archbishop Øystein

20. Saint Hallvard

19. Archbishop Øystein
The archbishop Saint Øystein was one of the main drivers of the construction of the Nidaros Cathedral, inspired by the Gothic Canterbury Cathedral. He was born circa 1120, died 1188 and was declared a saint in 1229. In the sculpture, Archbishop Øystein holds a model of the cathedral in miniature in his hands. The statue was based on a model by Stinius Fredriksen and carved by Fredriksen Stinius by Oscar Lynum.

20. Saint Hallvard
Hallvard is a Norwegian saint, and is patron saint of the city of Oslo. Born around 1020, he was killed for helping a fugitive woman, an event that by tradition occurred on 15 May 1043. His body was sunk in Drammensfjord with a millstone tied round his neck, but he miraculously came out alive and with the stone around his neck. He was considered a martyr and was canonized as a saint. The sculpture is based on a model by Nic Schiøll and was carved by Jakob Skaufel, representing the saint with the arrows and a mill wheel characteristic of his travail in his hands.

21. Saint Sunniva
Saint Sunniva was an Irish princess who fled to Norway, where she was killed by the enemies of King Olaf I in the 10th century. She was the first canonized saint of Norway and a central figure for the Christianization of the country. Stinius Fredriksen, who designed the sculpture, represented her with a rock in her hands. The image was carved by Gunnar Olsen.

22. Saint Olaf
St. Olaf was a king of Norway who died at the Battle of Stiklestad in 1030 while strongly promoting Christianity in Norway. After his death, his tomb was opened and the body was found incorrupt. He was canonized in 1031 and later buried at the site that is currently the main altar of the Cathedral of Nidaros. He is a leading Nordic saint. His statue is shown with a war axe in one hand and an orb in the other. Olaf's sculpture stands on a dragon-shaped creature with a human head, representing Paganism. It is Stinius Fredriksen's design as carved by Per Jensen.

21. Saint Sunniva

22. Saint Olav

==== Middle row: the three theological virtues ====
On the left side of the rosette-shaped window sculptures are three women, representing three theological virtues: Faith, Hope, and Love or Charity. These virtues provide the foundation for, as well as characterizing and encouraging, Christian morality. The theological virtues are related to the four cardinal virtues located on the right side of the cathedral's rose window.

23. Charity

24. Hope

25. Faith

23. Charity
Charity is the virtue by which we love God above all else and our neighbor as ourself. And now remain faith, hope, and charity, these three: but the greatest of these is charity. (Corinthians 13:13). The image of the charity was based on a model by Odd Hilt and carved by Johannes Opdahl.

24. Hope
Hope is the virtue of those who yearn for the kingdom of heaven and eternal life, as well as those who believe in the promises of Christ and in divine help. Hope is based on a model by Arnold Haukeland, was carved by Arfinn Weiseth.

25. Faith
Faith is the virtue of those who believe in the word and the revelations of God. The statue holds a cross with hand stuck to the chest. It is the work based on a model by Stinius Fredriksen as carved by Gunnar Olsen.

==== Middle row: Annunciation ====
The Annunciation was the moment when Mary received the news that she was to be the mother of Jesus. This represents to opposite of the expulsion from paradise, which appears on the opposite side of the rose window. The alliance with God was broken by the expulsion, but the contact was reestablished through the Annunciation. The group of sculptures is based on a model by Stinius Fredriksen.

26. Prophet Isaiah
Isaiah foresaw the birth of Jesus: "Therefore the Lord himself shall give you a sign: Behold, a virgin shall be with child; she will bear a son and his name shall be Immanuel." (Isaiah 7, 14). The statue is based on a model by Stinius Fredriksen and hewn by Gunnar Olsen.

27. Archangel Gabriel
Gabriel came to Mary. And the angel said unto her, Fear not, Mary: for thou hast found favor with God. And, behold, thou shalt conceive in thy womb, and bring forth a son, and shalt call his name Jesus. (Luke 1, 30-31). The image was sculpted by Arne Kvidbergskår.

28. Virgin Mary
Virgin Mary was chosen by God to bear his son. She accepted and contributed as the servant of the Lord in an exemplary manner to fulfill the plans of God. Mary is contrasted with Eve on the opposite of the rose window: while Eve was seduced by sin Mary followed the will of God and restored the damage of original sin. The statue is based on a model by Stinius Fredriksen and hewn by Oscar Lynum.

26. Prophet Isaiah

27. Archangel Gabriel

28. Virgin Mary

==== Middle row: Expulsion from Paradise ====
The sculptural group of the expulsion from paradise, is located just to the right side of the rosette from across from the Annunciation on the left side. The error of sin and the expulsion was reversed by Jesus' birth and crucifixion. The three sculptures in this series were based on models by Nic Schiøll.

29. Angels

30. Adam

31. Eve

29. Angel
Angels or cherubim are shown guarding the gates of paradise based on the story of the expulsion: So he drove out the man; and he placed at the east of the garden of Eden Cherubims, and a flaming sword which turned every way, to keep the way of the tree of life.. The Statue is based on a model by Nic. Schiøll as carved by Arne Kvidbergskår.

30. Adam
Upon expulsion from paradise, God said to Adam: "Because thou hast hearkened unto the voice of thy wife, and hast eaten of the tree, of which I commanded thee, saying, Thou shalt not eat of it: cursed is the ground for thy sake; in sorrow shalt thou eat of it all the days of thy life" (Genesis 3:17). The statue was modeled by Nic. Schiøll, showing Adam covering himself with a grape leaf, and at his feet is a representation of Tree of Knowledge of Good and Evil as carved by Jakob Skaufel.

31. Eve
The serpent seduced Eve to eat of the tree of knowledge. ... when the woman saw that the tree was good for food, and that it was pleasant to the eyes, and a tree to be desired to make one wise, she took of the fruit thereof, and did eat, and gave also unto her husband with her; and he did eat... The statue was based on a model by Nic. Schiøll and carved by Gunnar Olsen.

==== Middle row: the four cardinal virtues ====
On the right side of the middle row are the four cardinal virtues represented by simply dressed women. These human virtues are related to the saints who appear in the same row of sculptures. They are also mentioned in Ephesians 5, 9: …the fruit of the Spirit is in all goodness and righteousness and truth. They complement the sculptures to the left side of the rosette-shaped window, who are three women representing the three theological virtues. The four sculptures are based on models developed and carved by Odd Hilt.

32. Truth
The virtue of truth extends to honesty and sincerity with regard to reality. The statue of the truth is represented as a woman who raises her hand in oath, is based on a model by Odd Hilt as carved by Ola Moumen.

33. Compassion
Compassion is one of the Christian virtues, and is related to justice and morality. The sculpture is a woman with open arms, based on a model by Odd Hilt as carved by Jakob Skaufel.

34. Peace
Peace is the absence of conflict and the statue bears a palm leaf in her hand, the symbol of peace, but also of the victory of Christianity. The statue is based on a model by Odd Hilt as hewn by Oscar Lynum.

35. Justice
Justice is one of the four cardinal virtues and it follows a life morally correct. The statue carries a sword and a scale, the traditional symbols of justice. The statue is based on a model by Odd Hilt as hewn by Josef Ankile.

32. Truth

33. Compassion

34. Peace

35. Justice

==== Middle row: Norwegian saints on the right side ====
37. Saint Magnus

38. Bishop Erlend

36. Bishop Torlak
Bishop Thorlákr Thorhallsson is the national saint of Iceland. He was born in 1133 and was appointed bishop to Iceland in 1174 by the Archbishop Øystein. He died in 1193 and was declared a saint by the Althing in 1198. Saint Torlak was based on a model by Anne Raknes and is represented with a book in his left hand (a sign of his scholarship) while signing a blessing with his right hand. At has foot a man is being trampled by the Bishop, in allusion to the struggle Torlak launched against local heathen chieftains. The sculpture was carved by Gunnar Olsen.

37. Saint Magnus
Saint Magnus was Earl of Orkney in the early 12th century, and is considered the national saint of the islands. Born circa 1076, he was a man noted for his piety and his death by treacherous action of Haakon Paulsson in 1115 was considered a martyrdom. He was canonized much later, in 1898. St. Magnus Cathedral in Kirkwall is dedicated to him. The sculpture was modeled by Stinius Fredriksen and sculpted by Oscar Lynum.

38. Bishop Erlend
Erlendur was bishop of the Faroe Islands from 1269 until his death in 1308. He is an important figure in the history of the islands, and the founder of the diocese of Kirkjubøur. His statue is based on a model by Odd Hilt, as executed by Oscar Lynum.

==== Bottom row (left): Evangelistic Kings and Saints ====
39. Olaf Tryggvason
Olaf Tryggvason of Olaf I of Norway was born circa 968 and died in the battle of Svolder in 1000. He is considered the second Christian king of Norway. He also founded the city of Nidaros in 997, where he built a church. Between the statue's feet one can see the head of Tormod Kark, a slave who slew his pagan master, Haakon Jarl. The statue is based on a model by Stinius Fredriksen as sculpted by Gunnar Sundet.

40. Bishop Sigurd
Bishop Sigurd came with Olav Tryggvason from England to Christianize the country and is the first to canonize a Norwegian Saint, Saint Sunniva. According to tradition, the evangelist then proceeded to Sweden, where his three nephews were decapitated and their heads arranged in a bowl and thrown into the river. The statue of Bishop Sigurd bears in his hand a bowl with three heads of his nephews. According to legend he found them floating in the water, and they told him of the foul deed. The features of Bishop Sigurd are modeled by Dyre Vaa based on the Norwegian poet Aasmund Olavsson Vinje. The heads in the bowl have the appearance of the architects instrumental in the reconstruction of the cathedral: Gudolf Blakstad, Herman Munthe-Kaas and Helge Thiis. The statue was sculpted by Kristofer Leirdal.

41. Saint Clement
Saint Clement, also known as Saint Clement of Rome, was one of the first Bishops of Rome. He was the first Apostolic Father of the early Christian church. He was martyred, being thrown into the sea with an anchor attached to his neck. He is the patron saint of sailors, and the first church in Norway, built in Nidaros, was devoted to him. The statue is based on a model by Dyre Vaa based on the features of the nynorsk poet Olav Aukrust, as sculpted by Tore Skjørestad.

39. Olav Tryggvason

40. Bishop Sigurd

41. Saint Clement

==== Bottom row (left): Apostles ====
42. Saint Philip

43. Saint Thomas

44. Saint Bartholomew

42. Saint Philip
Philip the Apostle or Saint Philip was one of the first followers of Jesus and a missionary in Asia Minor. He is represented with a Latin cross in his hands. The statue is based on a model by Nic. Schiøll as sculpted by Josef Ankile.

43. Saint Thomas
Thomas the Apostle or Saint Thomas, is known for his reluctance to accept the resurrection of Jesus. According to legend, he preached in the India, where he founded a church. He carries in his hand a builder's ruler. The statue is based on a model by Stinius Fredriksen as sculpted by Jakob Skaufel.

44. Saint Bartholomew
Bartholomew the Apostle or Saint Bartholomew was a witness to the risen Jesus as well as witness of the Ascension. He is represented a knife in one hand and a human skin in the other, a symbol that he was skinned alive. The statue is based on a model by Arne Kvidbergskår as sculpted by Josef Ankile.

45. Saint Andrew
Andrew the Apostle was the brother of Peter and one of the early followers of Jesus. In his hands he holds a cross in the form of X, symbolizing that he was crucified for his faith. The statue is based on a model by Stinius Fredriksen based on an earlier work in Macshius' print from 1661, and was sculpted by Tore Skjærestad and Arne Kvidbergskår.

46. Saint John
John the Apostle was the youngest disciples and one of the disciples closest to Jesus. The sculpture, which represents John with a book in their hands, is a restored copy of a work dating from the medieval period (circa 1270 -1300) and is one of the few preserved from the original cathedral, and is considered the masterpiece of Gothic art in Norway. The statue is based on a reconstruction by Kristofer Leirdal as sculpted by Odd Kalvå. The original stands in the Archbishop's Palace museum.

47. Saint Peter
Saint Peter was a leader of the early Christian church, who features prominently in the New Testament Gospels and the Acts of the Apostles. According to Biblical accounts, he was one of Twelve Apostles, chosen by Jesus from his first disciples. He was the first Pope, founder of the first seat of Christianity in Rome. He holds the keys to heaven in his right hand. The statue is based on a model by Stinius Fredriksen as sculpted by Tore Skjørestad.

45. Saint Andrew

46. Saint John

47. Saint Peter

==== Bottom row (middle): crucifixion ====
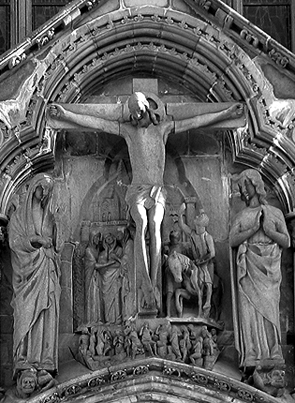
48. Crucified Jesus flanked by Mary and John

48. Crucifixion group: Mary, Jesus and John
This sculpture group of the crucifixion is located just below the rose window and consists of images of Mary, Jesus and St. John. The crucified Christ is the first of the three groups on the west front's center axis, which also consists of the day of judgement and the Christ Triumphant at the top of the. It is a reconstruction of a similar medieval work.. The statue was a gift from the king Haakon VII and Queen Maud in commemoration of his coronation in 1906, and was based on a model by Wilhelm Rasmussen as sculpted by Tore Skjørestad.

==== Bottom row (right): Apostles ====
49. Saint Paul
Saint Paul, along with Saint Peter, is considered one of the leading apostles. Although at first he was a persecutor of Christians, he later became the first great missionary and wrote most of the New Testament epistles. He is represented with a book and a sword in his hands, the latter attribute on account of his martyrdom in Rome. The statue is based on a model by Nic Schiøll as sculpted by Jakob Skaufel.

50. St. James the Greater
Saint James the Greater was a preacher and martyr of Christianity. Christian tradition places his remains in Santiago de Compostela. His image is a design by Nic Schiøll and shows the apostle pilgrim dress with staff a bag of shells scallops. The statue was sculpted by Jakob Ankile.

51. Apostle Simon
Apostle Simon was a preacher in Egypt and companion of St. Jude in Persia and Armenia. The image, in the traditional iconographic representation, shows a carpenter's saw in his hand. The statue is based on a model by Stinius Fredriksen as sculpted by Oscar Lynum.

49. Saint Paul

50. Saint James the Greater

51. Saint Simon

52. Saint Matthew

53. Saint James the Less

54. Saint Jude

52. Saint Matthew
Saint Matthew was a tax collector before becoming one of Jesus' disciples and one of the four evangelists. He ended his days as a martyr in Ethiopia. The sculpture is a reconstruction of the few original sculptures that were preserved. The original statue was missing the head and hands when reconstruction began, and today it can be viewed at the Archbishop's Palace. The replacement statue is based on a model by Stinius Fredriksen as sculpted by Gunnar Olsen.

53. St. James the Less
Apostle James the Less's mother was half sister of the Virgin Mary, and he was the brother of Saint Simon and Saint Jude. It is believed that he was the first bishop of Jerusalem. He was beaten to death with sticks by a mob; this is represented by the stick which he carries in his hand. It is one of the few statues which remained from earlier times. The statue was sculpted by Arne Kvidbergskår. The original statue dated from about 1270-1300 and now stands in the Archbishop's Palace .

54. Saint Jude
Saint Jude was one of Jesus' relatives. He is credited with authorship of the last epistle of the New Testament, and therefore is represented with a book in his hand. The statue is based on a model by Nic Schiøll as sculpted by Oscar Lynum.

==== Bottom row (right): Evangelistic Kings and Saints ====
55. Saint Nicasius
Saint Nicasius was archbishop of Reims, and was beheaded by the Vandals on the steps of his church in 407. The statue is based on a reconstructed model by Stinius Fredriksen (based on the original statue's torso) as sculpted by Josef Ankile. The remains of the original statue stands in the nearby Archbishop's Palace museum.

56. Saint Denis
Saint Denis is the patron saint of France and served as the bishop of Paris. He was martyred by beheading in Montmartre in 258 and according to the Golden Legend, after his head was chopped off, Denis picked it up and walked two miles, preaching a sermon the entire way. He is shown carrying his head. The sculpture is a copy of one of the few original works and, together with the image of Saint John, is considered among the greatest works of Gothic art in Norway. The statue was sculpted by Josef Ankile based on the original which stands in the nearby Archbishop's Palace museum.

57. Saint Francis of Assisi
Francis of Assisi renounced his wealth to found the mendicant order of the Franciscans in the 13th century. In the sculpture he carries his simple monk's habit. The statue was sculpted by Johannes Opdahl.

55. Saint Nicasius

56. St. Denis

57. Saint Francis

== Literature ==
- Adresseavisen (1969). Nidaros katedralens gjenreisning, en hundreårig prosess (Nidaros Cathedral reconstruction, a One Hundred Year Process). særtrykk av Adresseavisen (offprints of the newspaper Adresseavisen).
- Bakken, Arne (1997). Nidarosdomen – en Pilegrimsvandring (Nidaros Cathedral - a Pilgrimage). Aschehoug, Oslo. ISBN 82-03-22186-6.
- By, Sverre (1946). Nidarosdomen (Nidaros Cathedral). Fabritius og sønners forlag, Oslo.
- Danbolt, Gunnar (1997). Nidarosdomen, fra Kristkirke til nasjonalmonument (Nidaros Cathedral, from Christian Church to National Monument). Andresen og Butenschøn, Oslo. ISBN 82-7694-024-2.
- Ekroll, Øystein (1995). Nidaros domkirke og erkebispegården (Nidaros Cathedral and the Archbishop's Manor Museum). Trondheim: Nidaros Domkirkes Restaureringsarbeiders forlag. ISBN 82-7693-015-8.
- Ekroll, Øystein (2006). Nidarosdomen - Vestfrontens skulpturer (Nidaros Cathedral - West Front Sculptures). Trondheim: Nidaros Domkirkes Restaureringsarbeiders forlag. ISBN 82-7693-061-1.
- Gunnarsjaa, Arne. Nidaros Domkirke og dens arkitektoniske symbolspråk (Nidaros Cathedral and its Architectural Symbolism). Religion og livssyn nr. 4. pp. 5–11.
- Havgar, Torgeir Jebsen (1973). Glassmaleriene i Nidarosdomen (Stained Glass Artists in Nidaros Cathedral). Nidaros og Trøndelagen, Trondheim.
- Larsen, Irgens, B. (1963). De gotiske skulpturer i Trondheim Domkirke (Gothic Sculpture in the Nidaros Cathedral). Oslo.
- Kirkhusmo, Anders (1972). Trondheim i 1000 år (Trondheim at 1000 years). F. Bruns Bokhandels forlag, Trondheim.
- Mathisen, Henrik (1926). Domkirken i Trondhjem og det norske folk (Nidaros Cathedral in Trondhjem and the Norwegian people). Oslo.
- Nidaros Domkirkes Restaureringsarbeider, Hvem er hvem på vestfronten, folder, Trondheim 2005
- Schütz, Bernhard (2002). Great Cathedrals. New York: Harry N. Abrams Inc.
- Schønning, Gerhard (2004) [1762]. Beskrivelse over Dom-Kirken i Throndhjem 1762 [Writings about Nidaros Cathedral in Trondheim in 1762]. Trondheim. ISBN 82-519-2007-8.
- Suul, Torgeir (1983). Nidarosdomen - glassmaleriene (Nidaros Cathedral stained glass). Trondheim: Nidaros Domkirkes Restaureringsarbeider. ISBN 82-90536-00-3.
- Suul, Torgeir (1980). Nidarosdomen - Vestfrontens skulpturer (Nidaros Cathedral - West Front Sculptures). Trondheim. ISBN 82-7693-036-0.
- Thiis, Helge (1974). Nidarosdomen i billeder (Nidaros Cathedral in pictures). Trondheim: F. Bruns bokhandels forlag.
