= Danbolt =

Danbolt is a surname. Notable people with the surname include:

- Erling Danbolt (1904–2002), Norwegian Lutheran priest
- Gunnar Danbolt (born 1940), Norwegian art historian
- Lars Johan Danbolt (1895–1981), Norwegian Lutheran priest
- Niels Christian Gauslaa Danbolt (1900–1984), Norwegian professor of medicine
