= Rein Church =

Church in Trøndelag, Norway

- Rein kirke
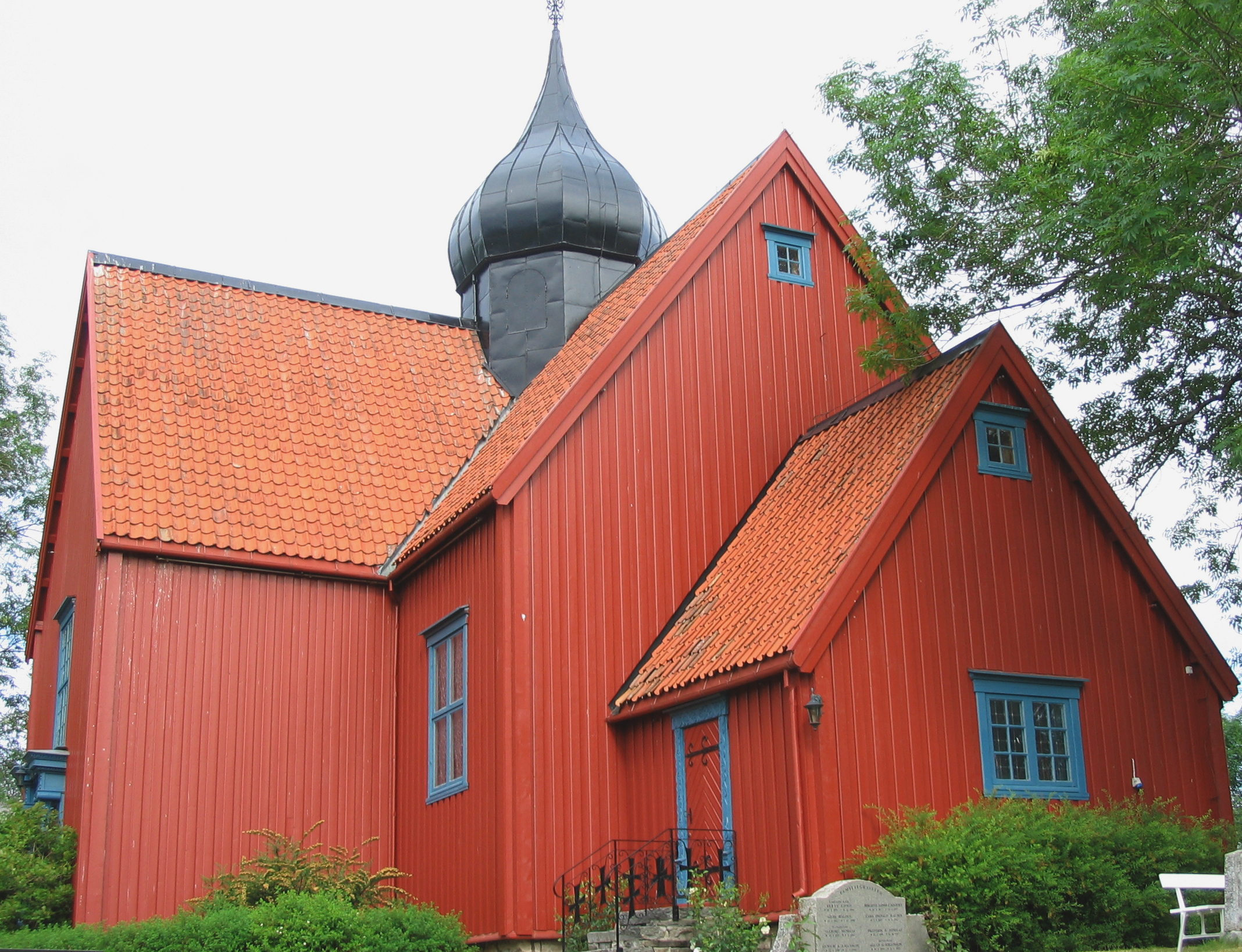
- View of the church
- Rein Church
- 63.56457664°N 09.92575988°E
- Location: Indre Fosen Municipality, Trøndelag
- Country: Norway
- Denomination: Church of Norway
- Churchmanship: Evangelical Lutheran

History
- Status: Parish church
- Founded: 13th century
- Consecrated: 24 Aug 1932

Architecture
- Functional status: Active
- Architect: Helge Thiis
- Architectural type: Cruciform
- Completed: 1932 (94 years ago)
- Closed: 1888-1932

Specifications
- Capacity: 400
- Materials: Wood

Administration
- Diocese: Nidaros bispedømme
- Deanery: Fosen prosti
- Parish: Rissa
- Norwegian Cultural Heritage Site
- Type: Church
- Status: Listed
- ID: 85279

Rein Church (Norwegian: Rein kirke) is a parish church of the Church of Norway in Indre Fosen Municipality in Trøndelag county, Norway. It is located in the village of Reinsgrenda, which is situated just south of the village of Årnset. It is one of the churches for the Rissa parish which is part of the Fosen prosti (deanery) in the Diocese of Nidaros. The red, wooden church was built in a cruciform style in 1932 by the architect Helge Thiis. The church seats about 400 people.

== History ==
The earliest existing historical records of the church date back to the year 1433, but the church was likely built during the 13th century. The first church was a stave church. By the mid-1600s, the church was described as "dilapidated". In 1649, the old church was torn down and replaced with a new building on the same site. The new church was a timber-framed building with a cruciform design that was built by Palle Joenssønn. Already on 24 January 1650, records show that the new church already had several shortcomings that needed to be finished including the lack of a pulpit, altarpiece, baptismal font, and entry porch. Another inspection in 1656 shows that the pulpit and second floor seating gallery had not yet been finished. During the night of 12 December 1689, the tower blew down in a storm, causing some roof damage as well.

In 1814, this church served as an election church (Norwegian: valgkirke). Together with more than 300 other parish churches across Norway, it was a polling station for elections to the 1814 Norwegian Constituent Assembly which wrote the Constitution of Norway. This was Norway's first national elections. Each church parish was a constituency that elected people called "electors" who later met together in each county to elect the representatives for the assembly that was to meet at Eidsvoll Manor later that year.

By the late 1800s, the church was in fairly poor condition. On 28 August 1886, permission was granted to demolish the church and build a new church at Årnset, about 6 kilometres (3.7 mi) to the northeast. The new Rissa Church was consecrated in 1888, and later that same year, the old Rein church was demolished. The people who lived near the old Rein Church were not happy about losing their local church, however. Within 30 years, this led to a local push to build a new Rein Church. The author Johan Bojer lead the initiative for a new church to be built and in 1932 the church was completed. It was a copy of the old church that had been torn down in 1888. The new church was consecrated on 24 August 1932. Bojer also established a fund for its continued maintenance called Johan Bojers Legat For Rein Kirke.

== Media gallery ==
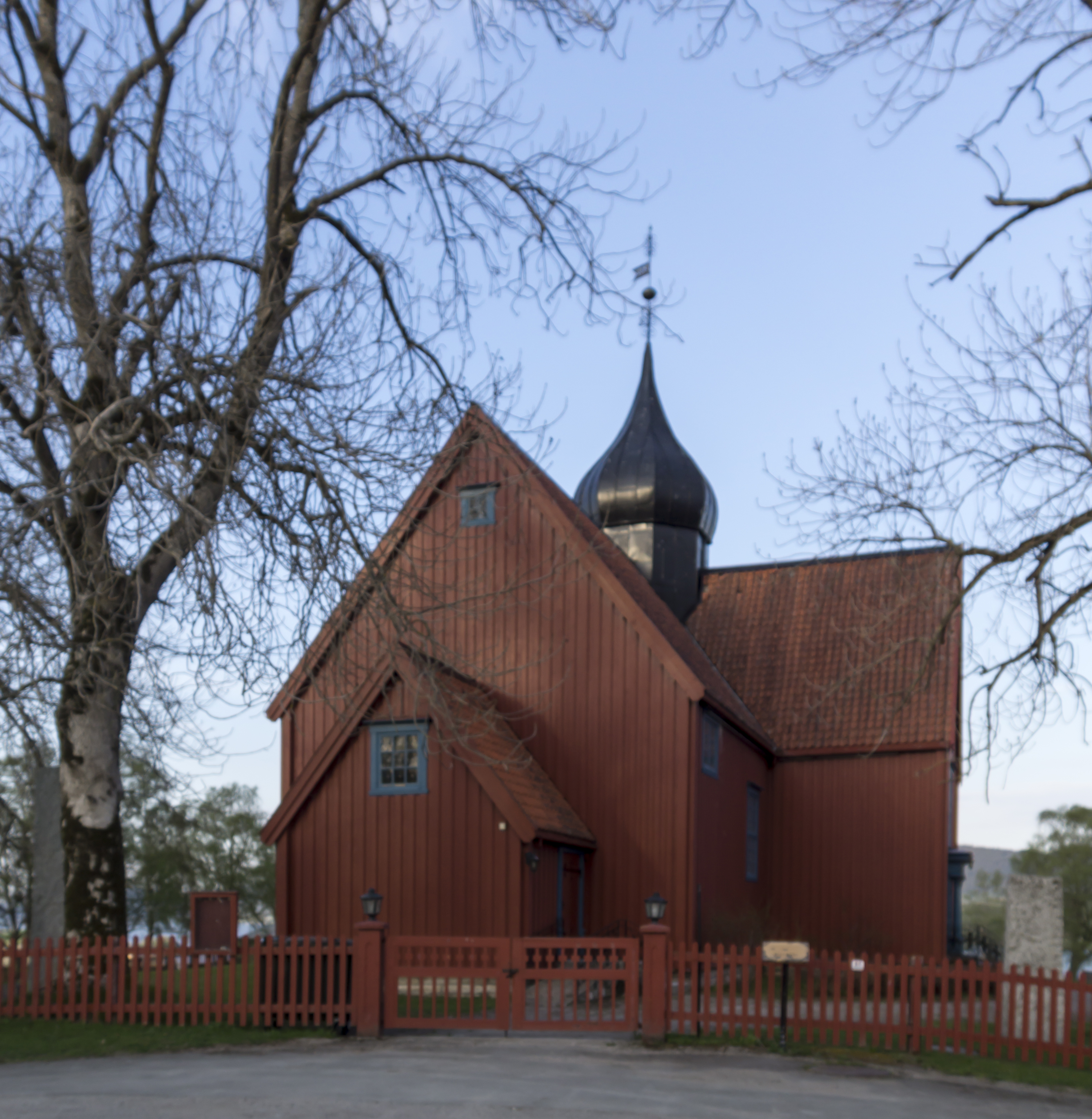

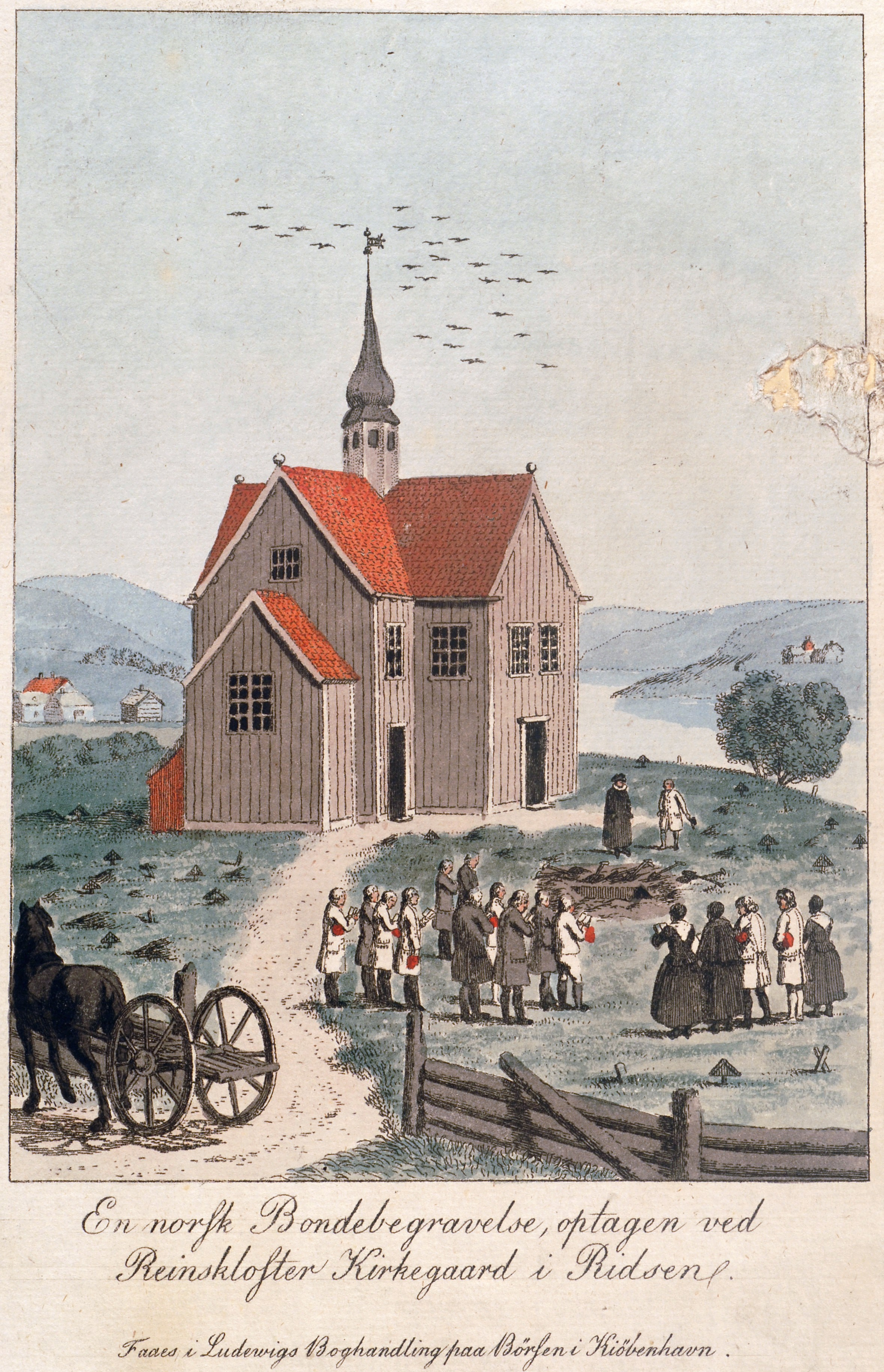

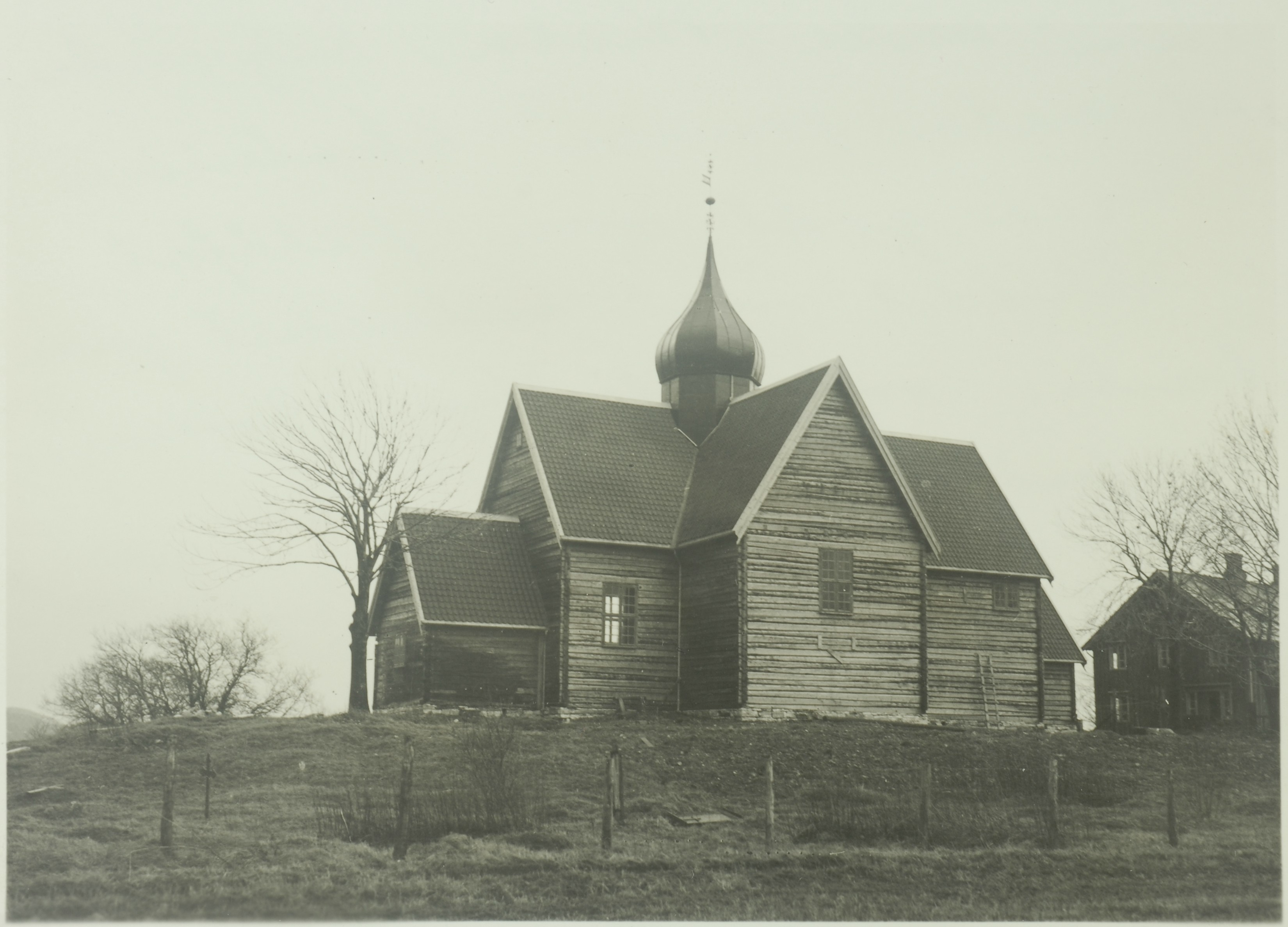

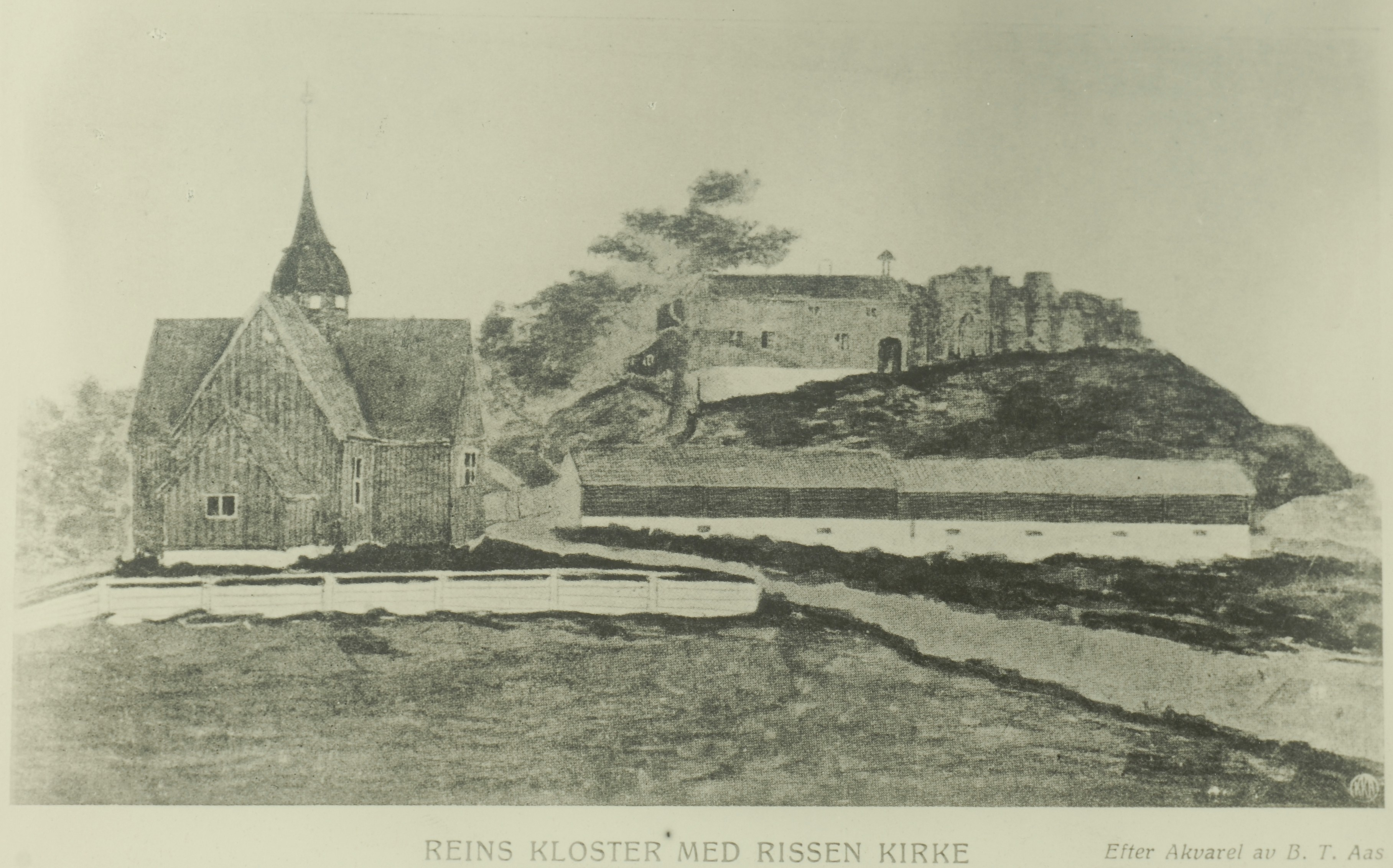

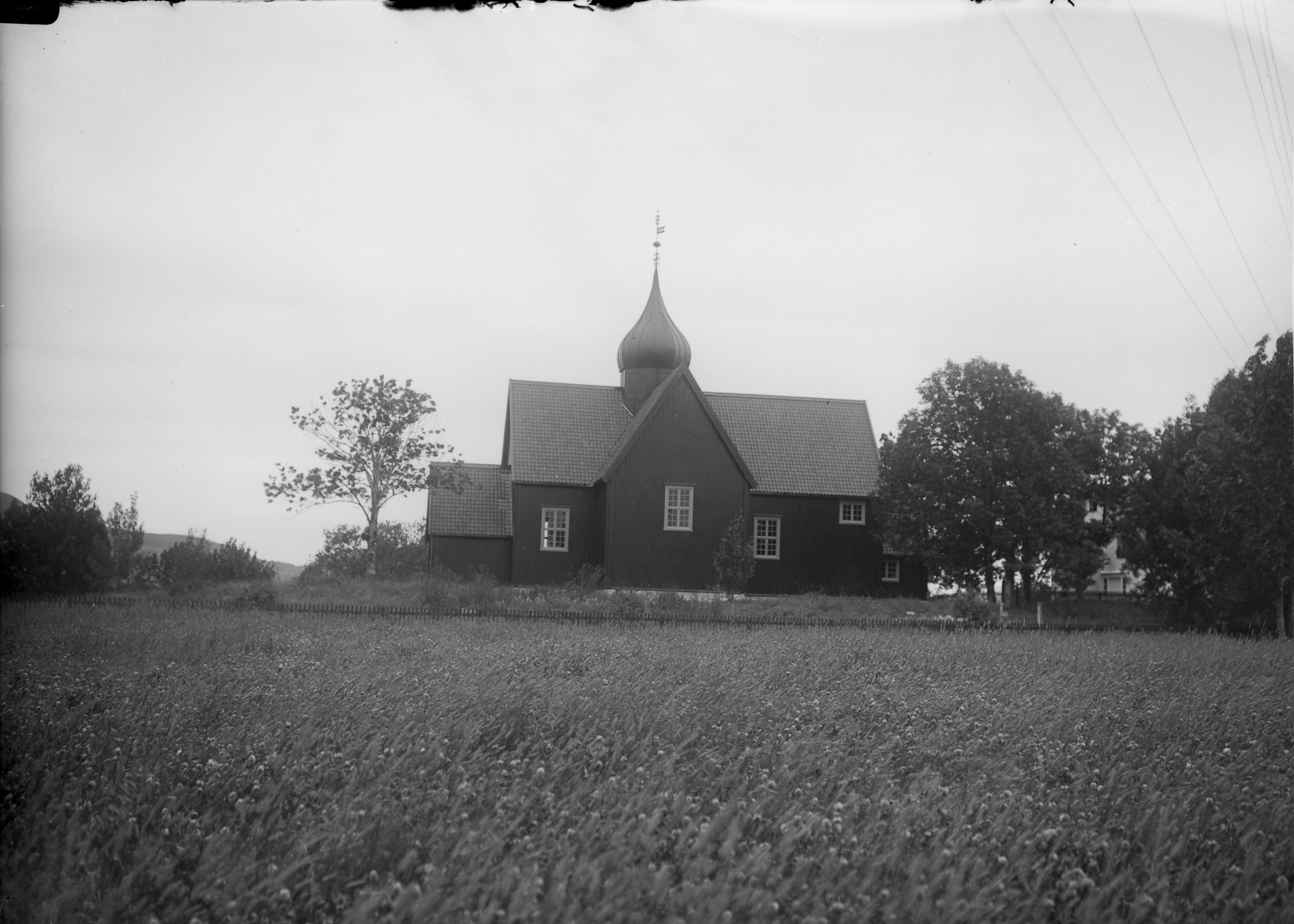

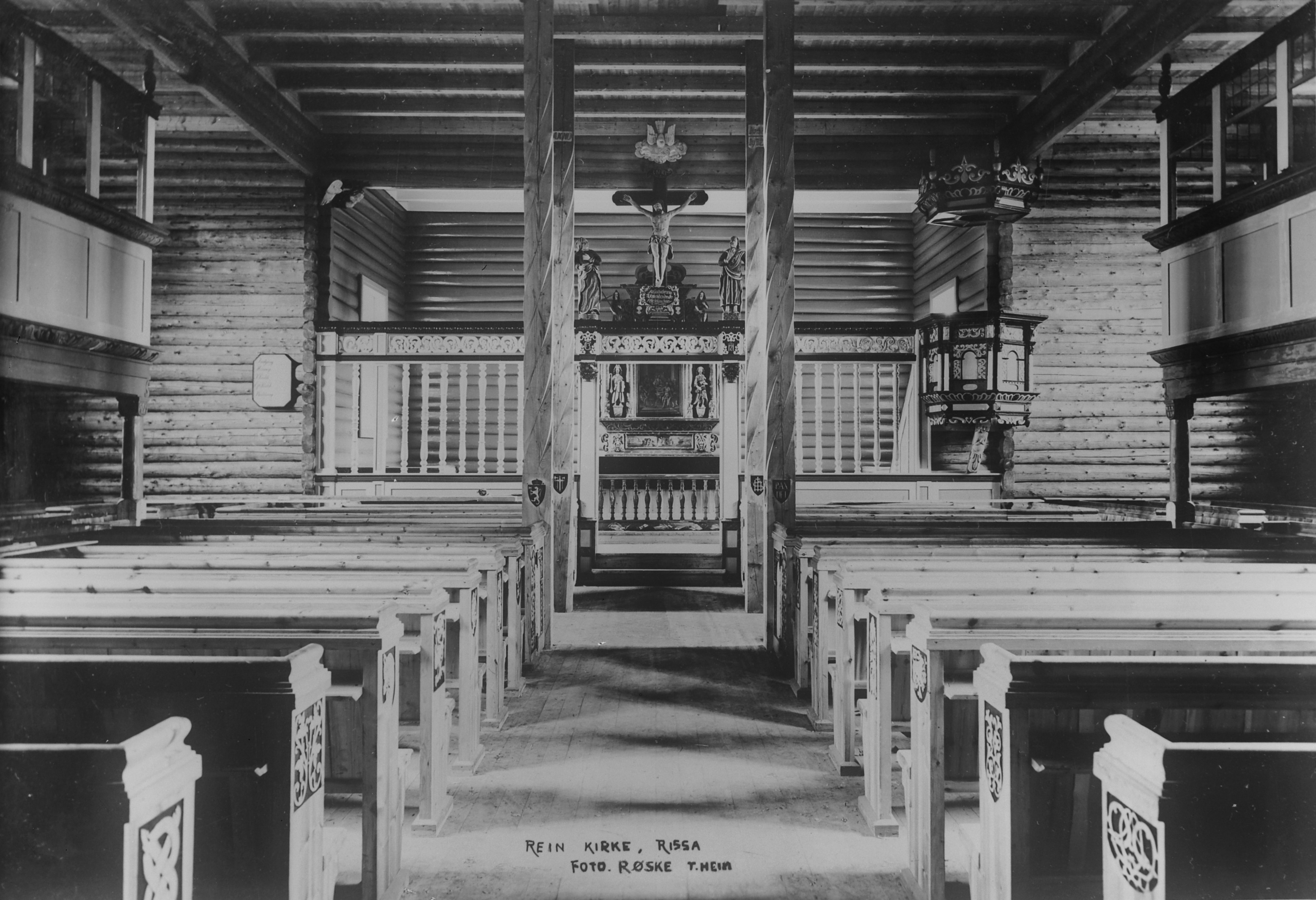

== See also ==
- List of churches in Nidaros
