= Gabriel Kielland =

Norwegian artist (1871–1960)

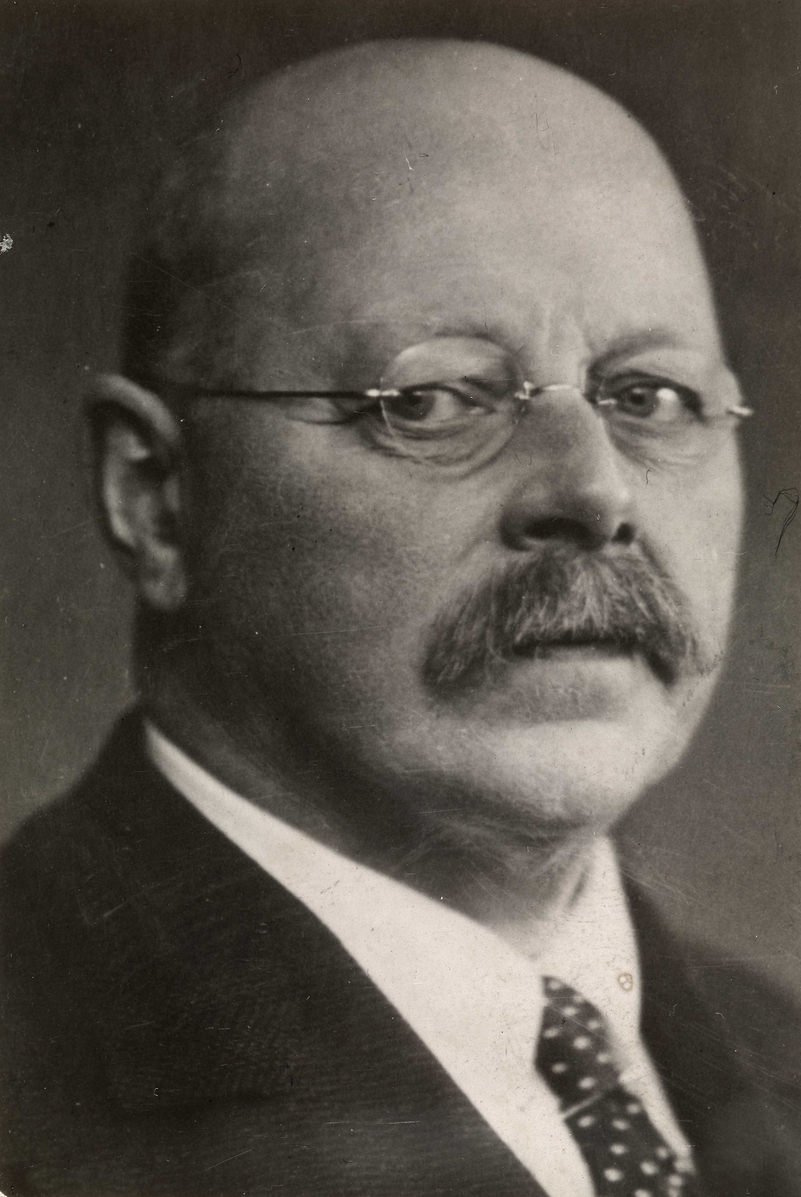
Gabriel Kielland, ca. 1930–1935. From the City History Collection at the Oslo Museum.

Gabriel Kielland (6 July 1871 – 28 September 1960) was a Norwegian Painter, architect and designer.

== Biography ==
Gabriel Kielland was born in Trondheim, Norway. Kielland is one of the many notable alumni of the Trondheim Katedralskole. Kielland later studied to become an architect in Hanover and then went to Munich in 1892 to study painting. He was a pupil in Weimar during 1894 and later studied with Alfred Philippe Roll in Paris.

From 1896 he worked for a time as an architect in Trondheim, in a rigorous and constructive Art Nouveau style, but also painted landscapes, portraits and several altarpieces. As an architect he designed, among other things, Trondheim electricity primary station at Øvre Leirfoss, Finnes orphanage and Dr. Cureas clinic in Trondheim. He later became a teacher of freehand drawing at Norwegian Institute of Technology in Trondheim 1899–1902.

Kielland is best known as the creator of the Rose Window (Rosevinduet i Nidarosdomen) in the Nidaros Cathedral in Trondheim. In 1908 he won the competition for the stained glass windows for the reconstruction of the Nidaros Cathedral's southern gable. In addition, Kielland delivered proposals to design all of the church windows and received the commission to create the stained glass windows. The paintings are iconographic imagery which were produced in collaboration with Oluf Kolsrud (1885–1945), professor of church history.

The Rose Window motif faces west into the sunset and symbolizes doomsday. The rose window's structural layout followed the design by cathedral architect Olaf Nordhagen, and the diameter is built up around an eightfold symmetry with the innermost parts proportioned such that the diameter is formed of 16 sheets. The painted glass in the window consists of over 10,000 pieces. The Rose Window was presented as a gift from the women of Norway for the anniversary of the death of St. Olav in 1930 and is regarded as Kielland's masterpiece.

== See also ==
- Nidaros Cathedral West Front
