= Tone Thiis Schjetne =

Norwegian sculptor (1928–2015)

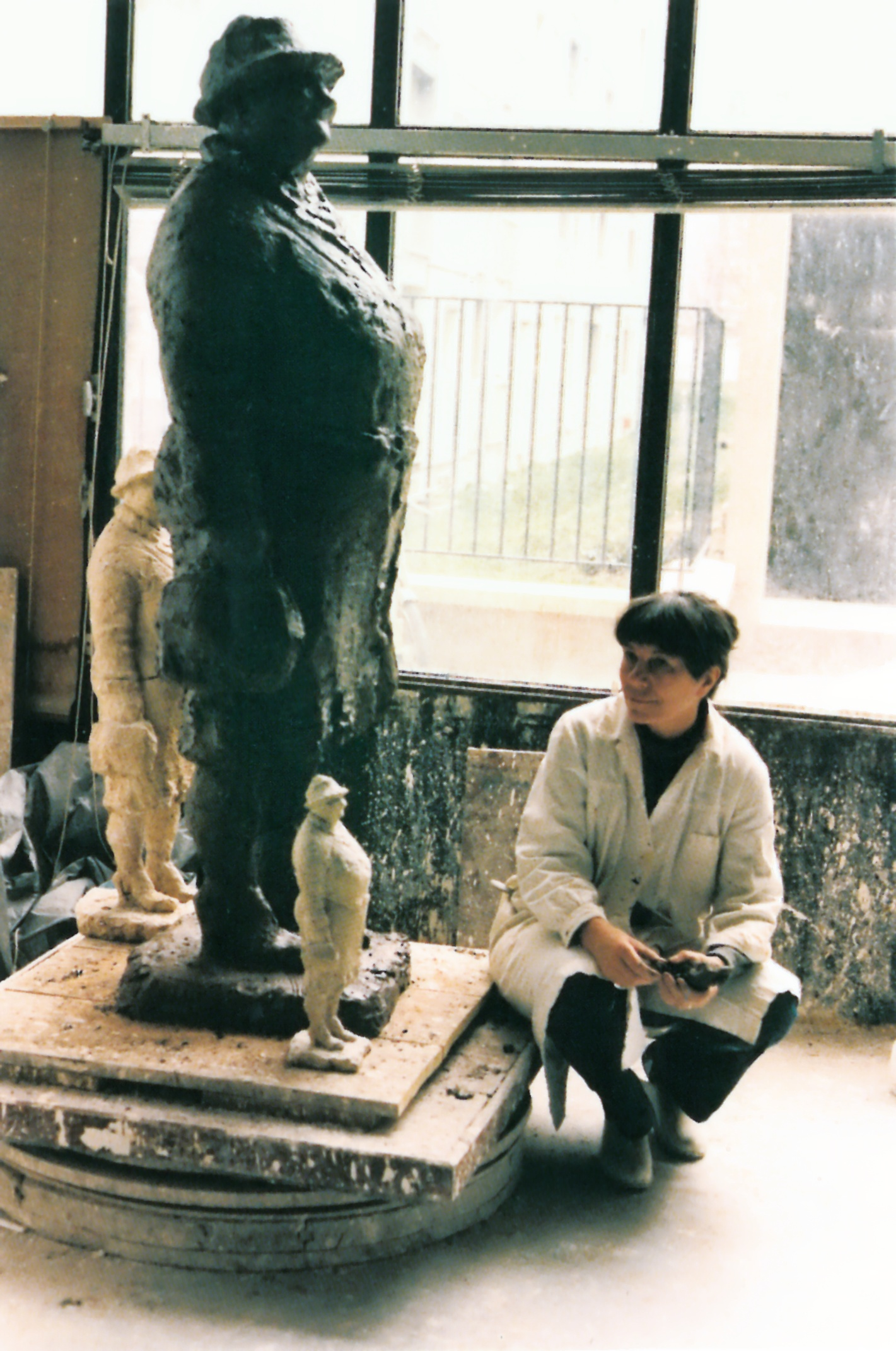
- Tone Thiis Schjetne working on the statue Go'dagen (1980)
- Born: 19 July 1928; Oslo, Norway
- Died: 2 September 2015 (aged 87)
- Education: Oslo National Academy of the Arts; Royal Danish Academy of Fine Arts
- Occupation: sculptor
- Parent: Helge Thiis
- Relatives: Kristofer Leirdal (brother-in-law)
- Awards: Ingeborg og Per Palle Storms ærespris

Tone Thiis Schjetne (19 July 1928 – 2 September 2015) was a Norwegian sculptor. She is represented in the National Gallery of Norway and other galleries, contributed several works to the Nidaros Cathedral, and made decorations to Vadsø Church. Among her best known public works is the bronze sculpture Go'dagen in Oslo, Trondheim and Stavanger.

== Personal life ==
Schjetne was born in Oslo, Norway to architect Helge Thiis (1897–1972) and painter Greta Swenborg Thiis (1896–1982). Her grandfather was museum director Jens Thiis (1870–1942). Her aunt Ragna Thiis Stang (1909–1978) was a historian. Her elder sister Aina is a ceramist, who was married to sculptor Kristofer Leirdal from 1947. Schjetne was married to physician Per Gunnar Schjetne; they settled in Sandnessjøen and had three children.

== Career ==
Schjetne was a student of Kristofer Leirdal at the Trondheim Academy of Fine Art from 1946 to 1947. She trained under Per Palle Storm at the Norwegian National Academy of Fine Arts in 1947-49 and with Einar Utzon-Frank at the Royal Danish Academy of Fine Arts in Copenhagen.

She debuted at the Autumn Exhibition (Høstutstillingen) in Oslo in 1950. For many years she was sculptor at Nidaros Cathedral in Trondheim. She is represented in the National Gallery of Norway and other galleries. She contributed a sculpture of Saint Peter the apostle at Vadsø Church in Finnmark. Her public works include Høylandsfrisen (1975) at the municipal hall for Sandnes Municipality, the bronze bust honoring the poet and novelist Tarjei Vesaas (1986) in Åmot in Vinje Municipality, and the sculptures Klovn and To klovner (1992) at Grønlands torg in Oslo.

Her most widely recognized work is the bronze statue Go'dagen (1980) which appears in Stavanger and Trondheim. The sculpture was modeled after Anna Kornelia Holm (1885–1962) who had worked as a maid and in retirement was frequently seen at Torvet, Trondheim's market square, where her standard greeting was go' day (Go'dagen).

Schjetne was awarded the Lorch-Schives legat in 1954 and the Conrad Mohrs legat in 1956. She was awarded the Ingeborg og Per Palle Storms ærespris in 2001 and made a Knight 1st Class in the Order of St Olav in 2004.

== Selected works ==
- Go'dagen I (Bronze. 1956) National Gallery
- Berit Olaug (Bronze. 1955) National Gallery
- Italienerinne (Bronze. 1955) National Gallery
- Morgenkåpen II (Bronze. 1976) National Gallery
