= Niels Christian Gauslaa Danbolt =

Norwegian professor of medicine

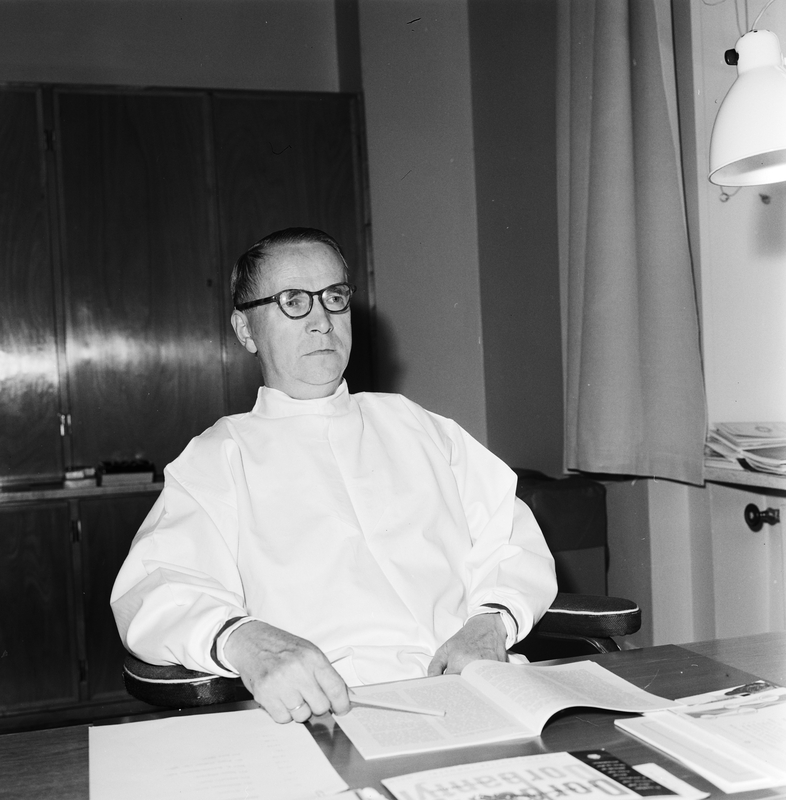
Niels Christian Gauslaa Danbolt

Niels Christian Gauslaa Danbolt (5 November 1900 – 4 September 1984) was a Norwegian professor of medicine who was a specialist in skin diseases. Danbolt-Closs syndrome (acrodermatitis enteropathica) was named after him and Karl Philipp Closs.

Danbolt was born in Bergen, Norway. He was the son of Ole Dominicus Danielsen (1863-1941) and Gesine Gauslaa (1866-1964). He was the brother of the missionary priest Lars Johan Danbolt and theology professor Erling Danbolt. He was the uncle of professor Ole Danbolt Mjøs and professor Gunnar Danbolt . His sister Johanna Sophie Danbolt was married to Bishop Olav Hagesæther.

Danbolt was cand.med. in 1925 and took the dr.med. degree at the University of Oslo in 1932. He studied in Zurich in 1934, Freiburg in 1936 and in the United States in 1946. He served multiple years as chairman of the Norwegian Dermatological Association. He served as a chief physician at Rikshospitalet as well as professor at the University of Oslo from 1936 to 1970.
