= Sivert Donali =

Norwegian sculptor

Sivert Donali (19 April 1931 – 6 December 2010) was a Norwegian sculptor.

== Biography ==
He was born in Oppdal Municipality in Sør-Trøndelag, Norway. He was the son of Marit Vekve (1899–1987) and Hans Donali (1898–1991). He studied at art school in Trondheim from 1948 to 1950 where his teachers included Kristofer Leirdal. He attended the Norwegian National Academy of Fine Arts from 1950 to 1953 where he studied under Per Palle Storm. From 1953 to 1954, he was enrolled at the Royal Danish Academy of Fine Arts studying under Einar Utzon-Frank and Mogens Bøggild.

He made his debut at the Autumn Exhibition in 1953 with a bust. From 1953 to 1954 he stayed in Copenhagen, where he studied at the Royal Danish Academy of Fine Arts under Einar Utzon-Frank and Mogens Bøggild. In 1963 Donali moved to the artist colony at the Oslo suburb of Bøler.

He became best known for his work with the Nidaros Cathedral. From 1957 to 1968, he had helped in the restoration of the cathedral while attending school in Trondheim. In 1957, he traveled under scholarship to England and France in order to study Gothic sculpture. He worked at Nidaros until 1968. He lived in Feiring in Akershus from 1973.

He was awarded the Benneches legat in 1952 and Lorch-Schives legat in 1955. He received the Nidaros Cathedral gold medal (Nidaros domkirkes gullmedalje) in 1969.

== Selected works ==
- Prophet Sakarias - Nidaros Cathedral (1959)
- Prophet Jeremiah - Nidaros Cathedral (1960)
- Prophet Usias - Nidaros Cathedral (1965)
- Prophet Jacob - Nidaros Cathedral (1965)
- Bergmann Monument - Røros Municipality (1963–65)
- Johan Falkberget - Røros Municipality (1975–78)
- Mann og hund - National Gallery (1978)
- Solskinn og sang - Ringsaker Municipality (1989)
- Birkebeinere - Lillehammer Municipality (1992)
- Alf Prøysen -Trubaduren - Nittedal Municipality (2001)
