= Helge Thiis =

Norwegian architect

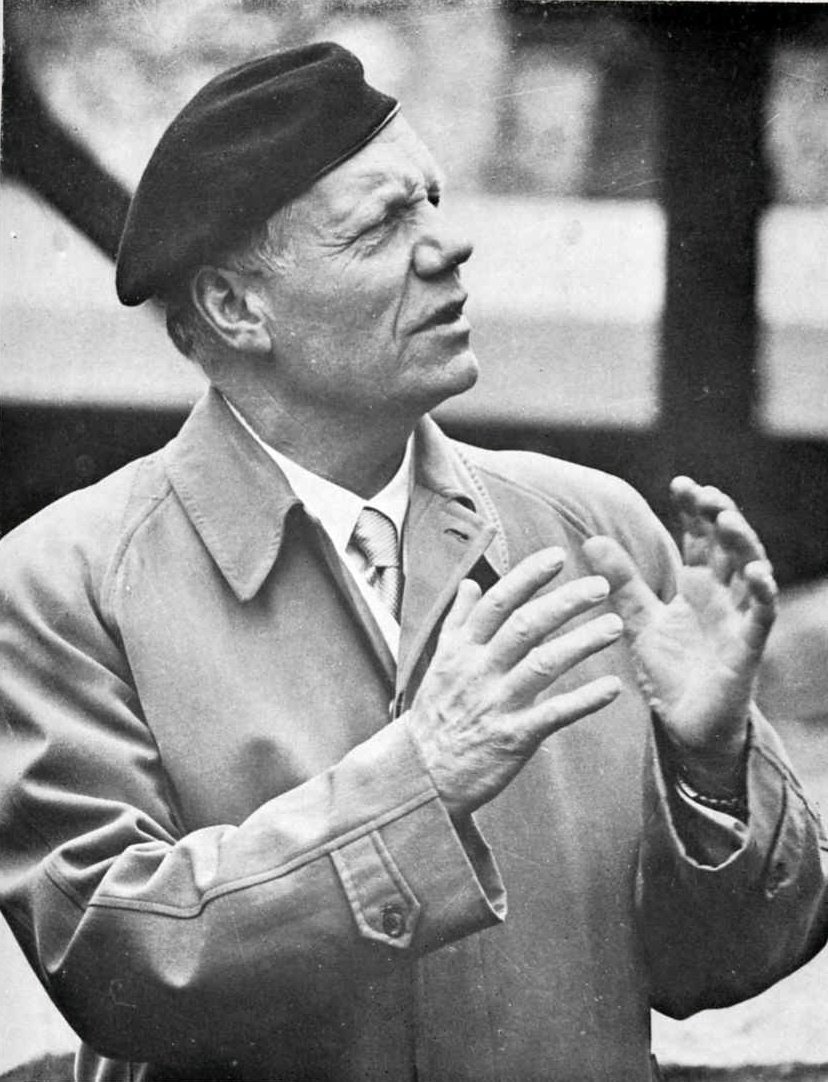
Helge Thiis

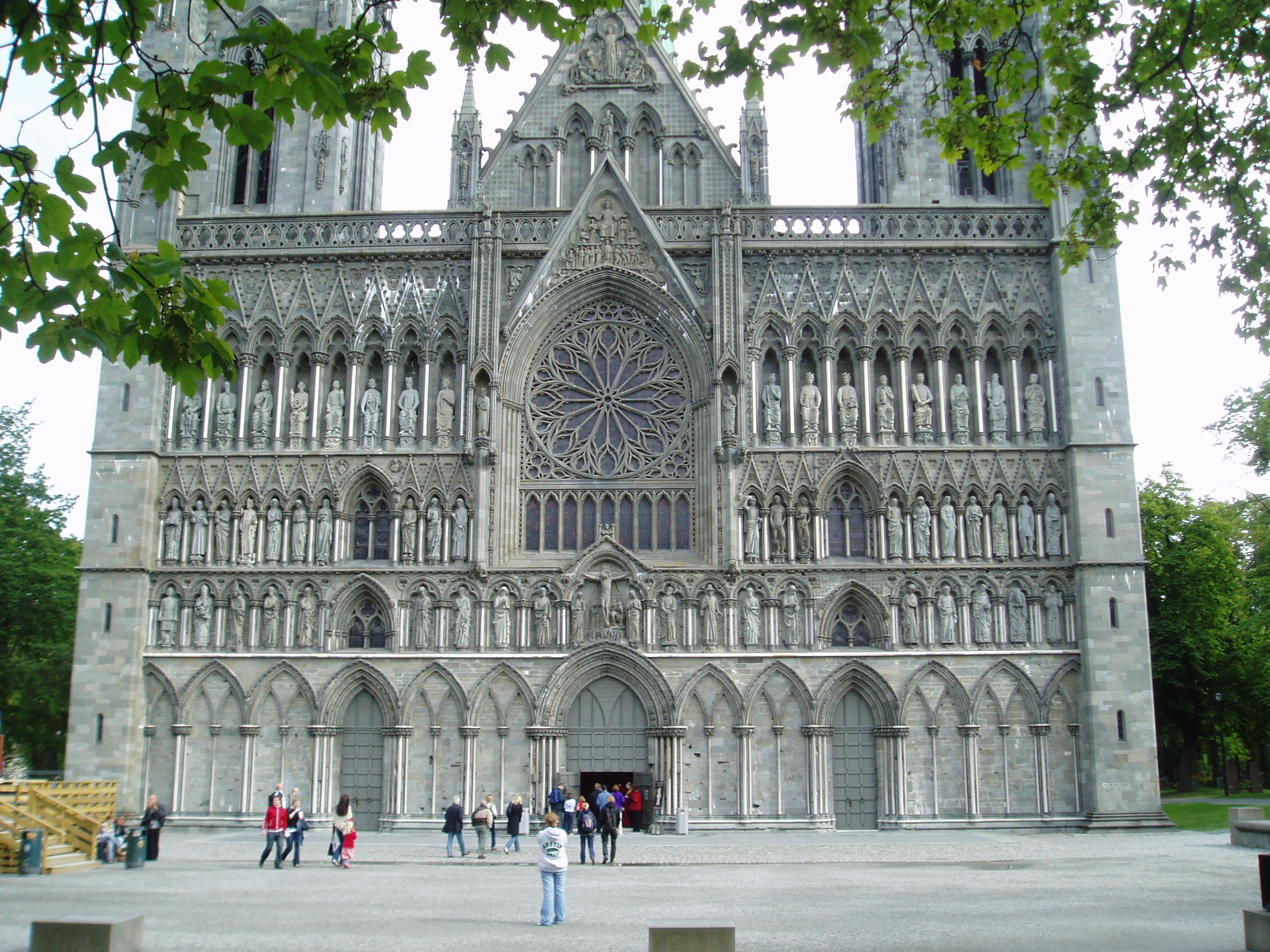
Nidaros Cathedral, west front

Helge Thiis (16 August 1897 – 1 August 1972) was a Norwegian architect. He is most noted for service as head architect at the restoration of Nidaros Cathedral.

== Background ==
Helge Thiis was born in Trondheim, Norway. He was the son of curator and museum director, Jens Thiis (1870–1942) and Ragna Vilhelmine Dons (1870–1939). The family moved to Kristiania (now Oslo) in 1908, when his father was appointed director at the National Art Museum (now the National Museum of Art, Architecture and Design).

Helge Thiis took his final examination in 1915 and began studying architecture at the Royal Institute of Technology in Stockholm, receiving his diploma in 1919. He worked 1920-23 as assistant architect for Arnstein Arneberg in Oslo, followed by architect Gunnar Asplund in Stockholm, and again in Oslo with the architectural firm of Andreas H. Bjercke (1883-1967) and Georg Eliassen (1880-1964). He was an art critic at the Norwegian daily newspaper, Nationen, from 1924 to 1929.

== Nidaros Cathedral Restoration ==
Helge Thiis was head of the Nidaros domkirkes restaureringsarbeider (Nidaros Cathedral Restoration Work). In 1929, he had won the competition for the reconstruction of the design of the west front and central tower of the Nidaros Cathedral. It included the redesign of the main octagon tower, the helmet and the completion of the Nidaros Cathedral West Front.

Most of it was covered with recesses for statues in the French Gothic style. The reconstruction of Nidaros Cathedral thus became an important arena for many of the leading Norwegian sculptors. Many of Norway’s leading sculptors joined in creating the western façade, working for several decades. Thiis was appointed as the cathedral architect, a position he held from 1930 until his death in 1972.

== Personal life ==
He was married to painter Greta Swendborg (1896-1982). Their daughter Tone Thiis Schjetne (1928–2015) was a sculptor. He was appointed Commander of the Royal Norwegian Order of St. Olav in 1953.

== Other works ==
- Residence for Professor Kristian Brandt, Oslo (1930)
- Reconstruction of Rein Church, on commission from the author Johan Bojer, Rein (1931)
- Own residence "Rogne", Trondheim, (1935)
- Residence for the Bishop in Trondheim, (1956)
- Residence for sculptor Tone Thiis Schjetne and Doctor Per Schjetne, Trondheim (1961)

== Other sources ==
- Bakken, Arne Nidarosdomen – en Pilegrimsvandring (Aschehoug, Oslo: 1997) ISBN 82-03-22186-6.
- Danbolt, Gunnar Nidarosdomen, fra Kristkirke til nasjonalmonument (Andresen og Butenschøn, Oslo: 1997) ISBN 82-7694-024-2.
- Ekroll, Øystein Nidarosdomen - Vestfrontens skulpturer (Nidaros Domkirkes Restaureringsarbeiders forlag. Trondheim: 2006) ISBN 82-7693-061-1.
