= Erling Danbolt =

Norwegian priest

Erling Danbolt (14 April 1904 – 16 September 2002) was a Norwegian priest.

He was born in Bergen as a son of the tanner Ole Dominicus Danielsen (1863–1941) and Gesine Gauslaa (1866–1964), and brother of the dean Lars Johan Danbolt and the professor Niels Danbolt. He finished his secondary education in 1924 and took the cand.theol. degree at the University of Oslo in 1930. He studied abroad from 1931 to 1932. In 1937 he married Else-Marie Tønnessen.

He joined the mission in Madagascar in 1931. From 1933 to 1935 he was a teacher at the Protestant Teachers' School in Fianarantsoa, In 1935 he founded the missionary station at Marolambo, which he managed until 1939. He returned to Norway to lecture at various theological schools. In 1947 he received his doctorate with the thesis Misjonstankens gjennombrudd i Norge. From 1948 to 1954 he was again a teacher in Fianarantsoa. He edited the local Lutheran magazine from 1948 to 1950 and published several books in both Malagasy and Norwegian.

In 1955 he was appointed as an acting docent at the MF Norwegian School of Theology, before he became a curate at Majorstuen in 1957. He was a board member of the Norwegian Association of Clergy from 1965 to 1966. From 1969 he was a professor at and chancellor of NLA University College until he retired in 1974.

He died in September 2002 and was buried at Vestre Gravlund.
