= Lars Johan Danbolt =

Norwegian priest

Lars Johan Danbolt (18 October 1895 – 7 June 1981) was a Norwegian priest.

He was born in Bergen as a son of tanner Ole Dominicus Danielsen (1863–1941) and Gesine Gauslaa (1866–1964), and brother of the professors Erling and Niels Danbolt. He finished his secondary education in 1914 and took the cand.theol. degree at the University of Oslo in 1919. In 1921 he married Benny Elisabeth Gabrielsen.

After serving briefly as a clergyman in Bergen and studying languages and history in Grenoble, he joined the mission in Madagascar in 1922. In 1927 he became a theology teacher at the Lutheran School of Clergy in Fianarantsoa, where he later served as rector from 1932 to 1939. He released a two-volume work on Luther in the Malagasy language in 1930 and 1935, and edited the local Lutheran church magazine from 1928 to 1930 and 1932 to 1938.

In 1939 he was appointed as vicar at Romedal Church. He then moved to Bærum Municipality in 1946 as curate in Østre Bærum. He was the vicar of Haslum from 1953 to 1965, then of Jar from 1965 to 1966. From 1959 to 1966 he was the dean in Asker and Bærum. He was a member of Bærum school board from 1950 to 1962.

He was also a teacher at the practical-theological seminary at the MF Norwegian School of Theology from 1948 to 1954. He was also a board member here from 1949, and chairman from 1956 to 1958. In both Hedmark and Oslo he was a regional board member of the Norwegian Missionary Society; he was also a board member of the Norwegian Association of Clergy from 1950 to 1952 and the Norwegian Bible Society from 1951 to 1965. He died in 1981 and was buried in Haslum.
