= Archbishop's Palace, Trondheim =

- Erkebispegården i Trondheim
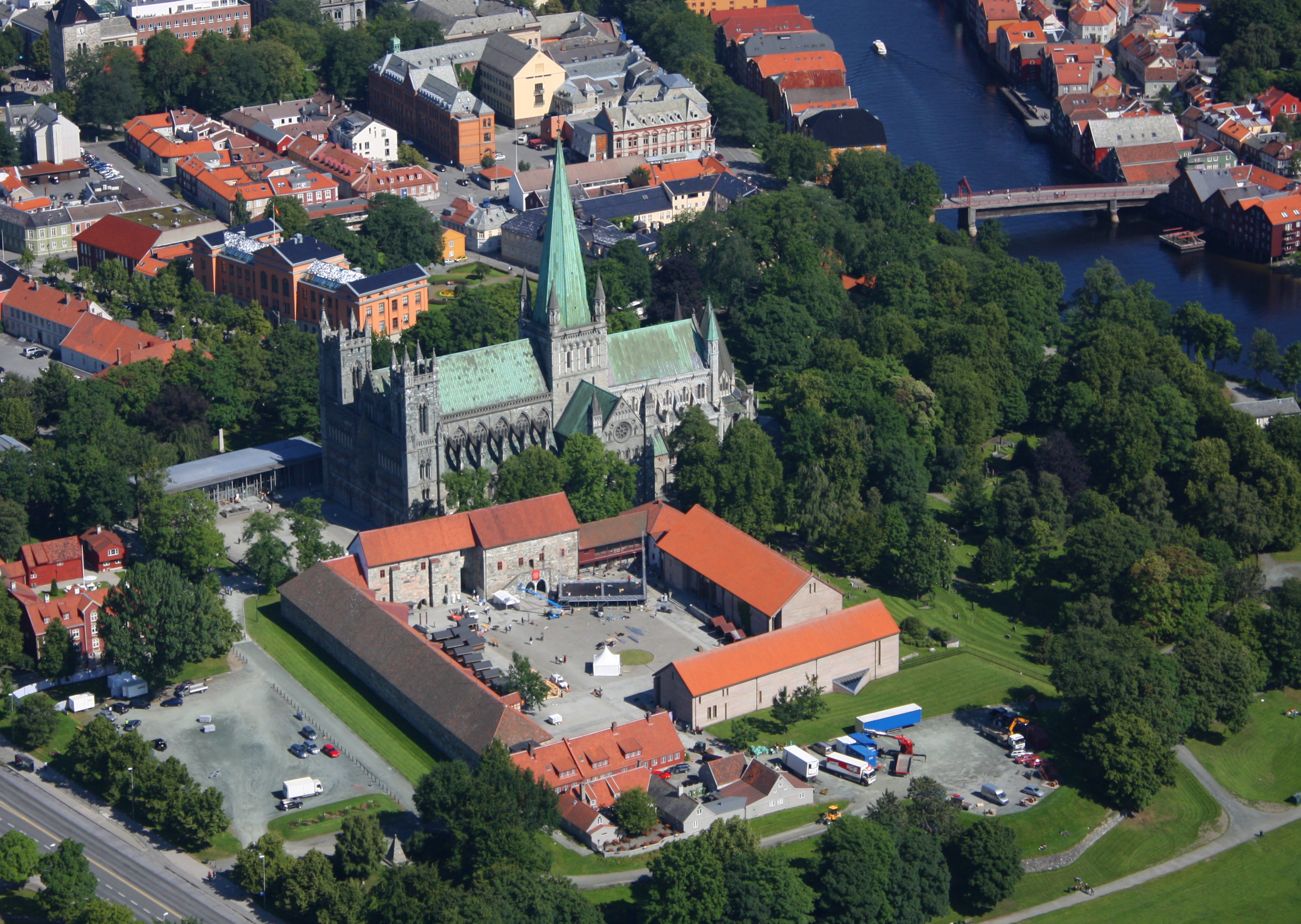
- Aerial view of the palace

- Location within Norway

General information
- Location: Trondheim, Norway
- Coordinates: 63.4261°N 10.3945°E
- Completed: 12th century

The Archbishop's Palace in Trondheim (Norwegian: Erkebispegården i Trondheim) is a castle and palace in the city of Trondheim, located just south of the Nidaros Cathedral. For hundreds of years, the castle was the seat, residence and administrative center of the Archbishop of Nidaros.

== During the Middle ages ==
The castle is one of the largest medieval stone structures in Scandinavia and the oldest walls are likely from the 13th century. The Archbishops of Nidaros expanded the castle gradually, with great halls and residential areas being built over time. Norway's last Archbishop, Olav Engelbrektsson, attempted to make a final stand and defend the castle during the Reformation but eventually fled into exile.

== Royal property ==
After the abolishment of Roman Catholicism, the castle became royal property where the local lensherre resided. The castle was restored, rebuilt into a residential palace and eventually used more for military purposes, again being expanded considerably. After the Sovereignty Act of 1660, the castle became the seat and residence of the Amtmann.

== Restoration and current use ==
Substantial archeological excavations were made during the 1950s by Nicolay Nicolaysen and Gerhard Fischer which led to restorations being made at the castle. Today, the castle has several museums, is frequently used by the Church of Norway and is also the venue of Olavsfestdagene.

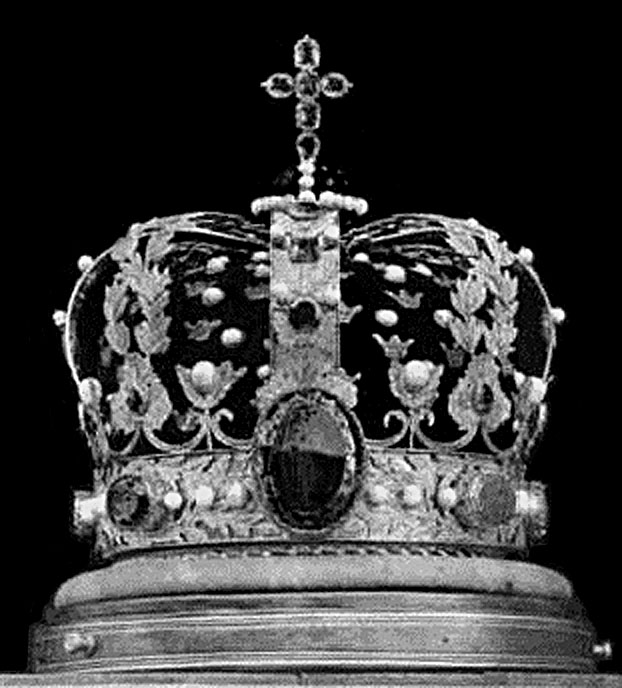
The Royal Regalia, including the Crown of Norway, is kept at the castle

== The Royal Regalia ==
The Regalia of Norway have been kept in the western flank of the castle at various times since 1826, but have been on permanent display in the castle since 2006.

== Gallery ==
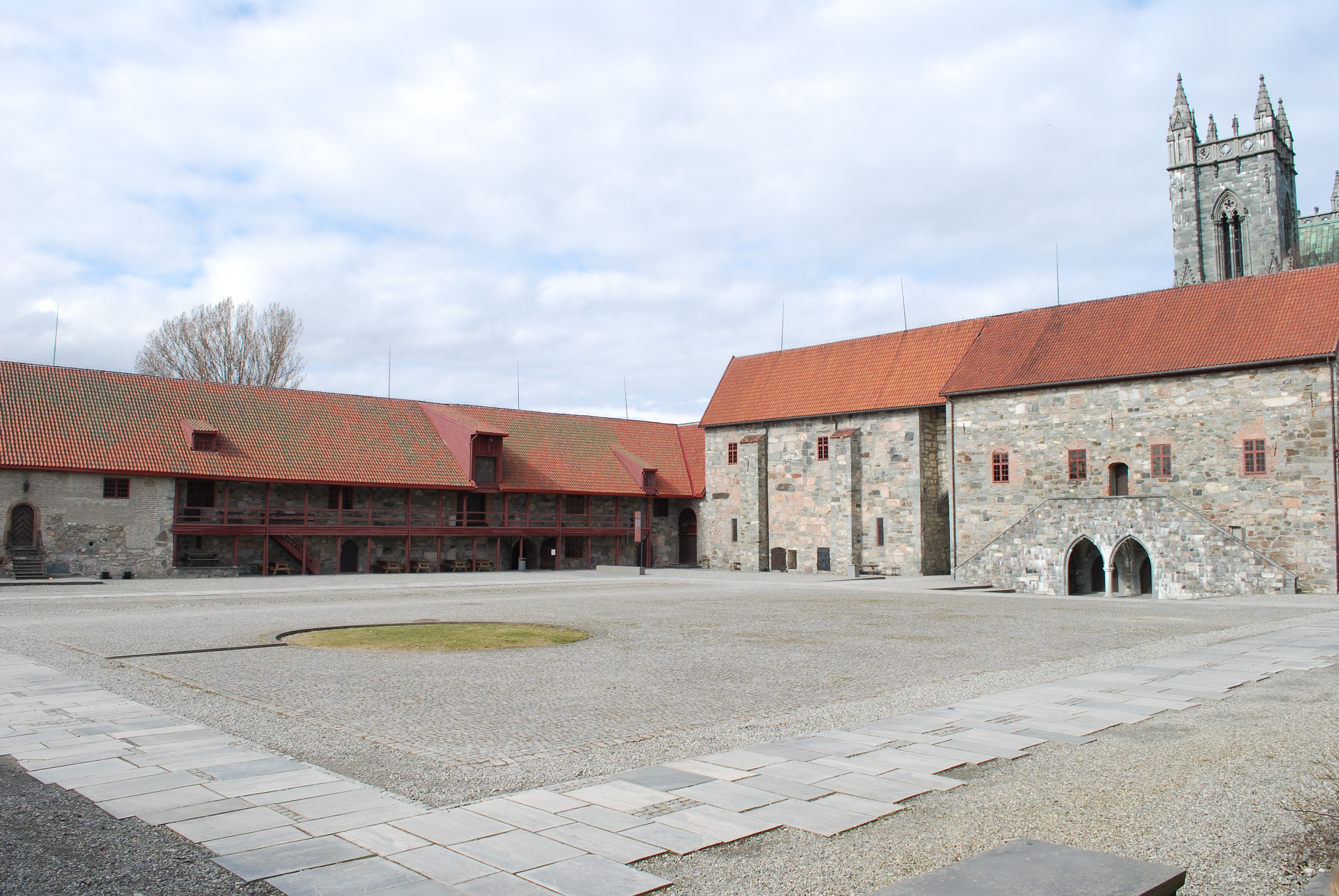
The courtyard of the castle

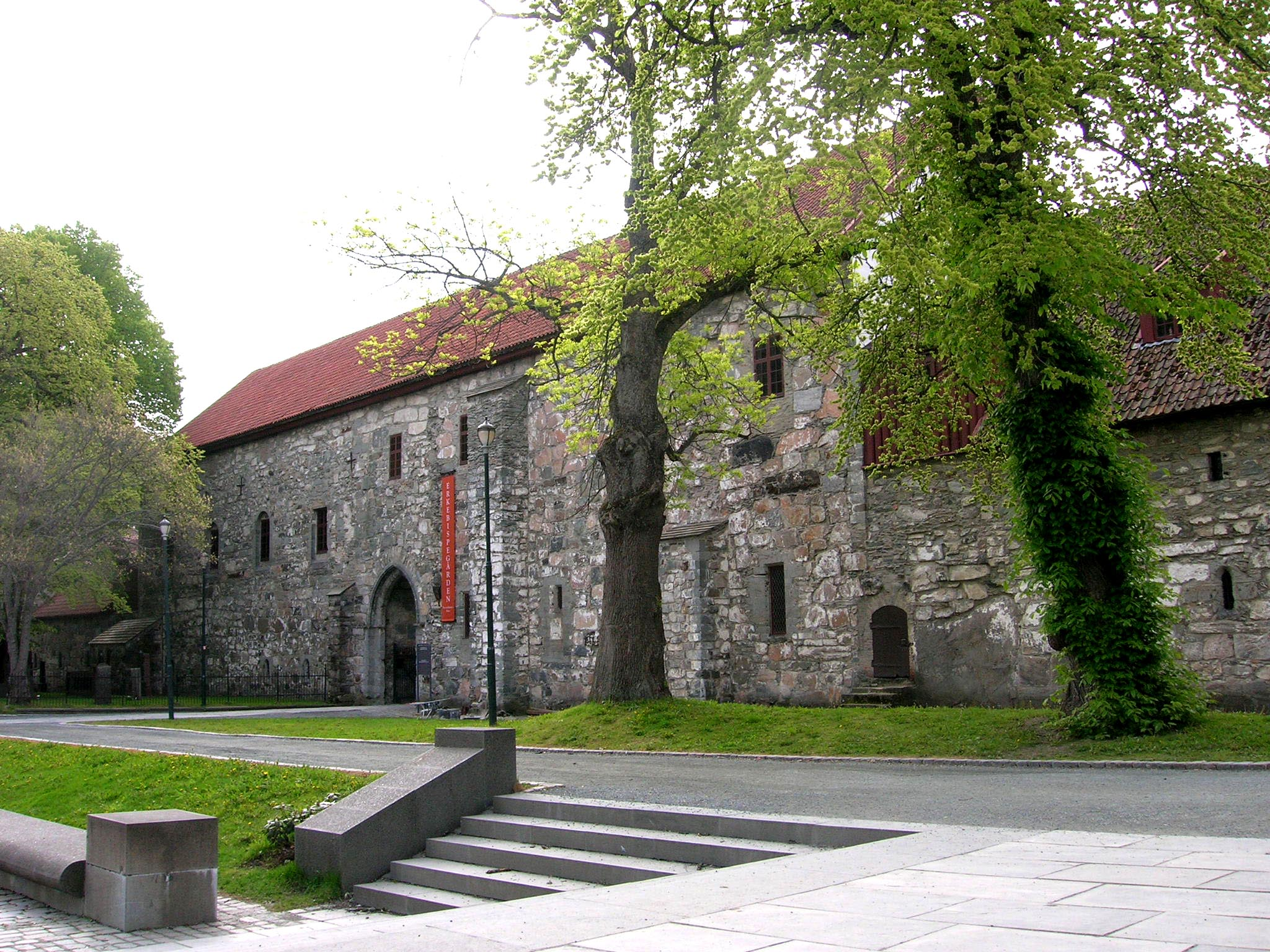
Castle gates

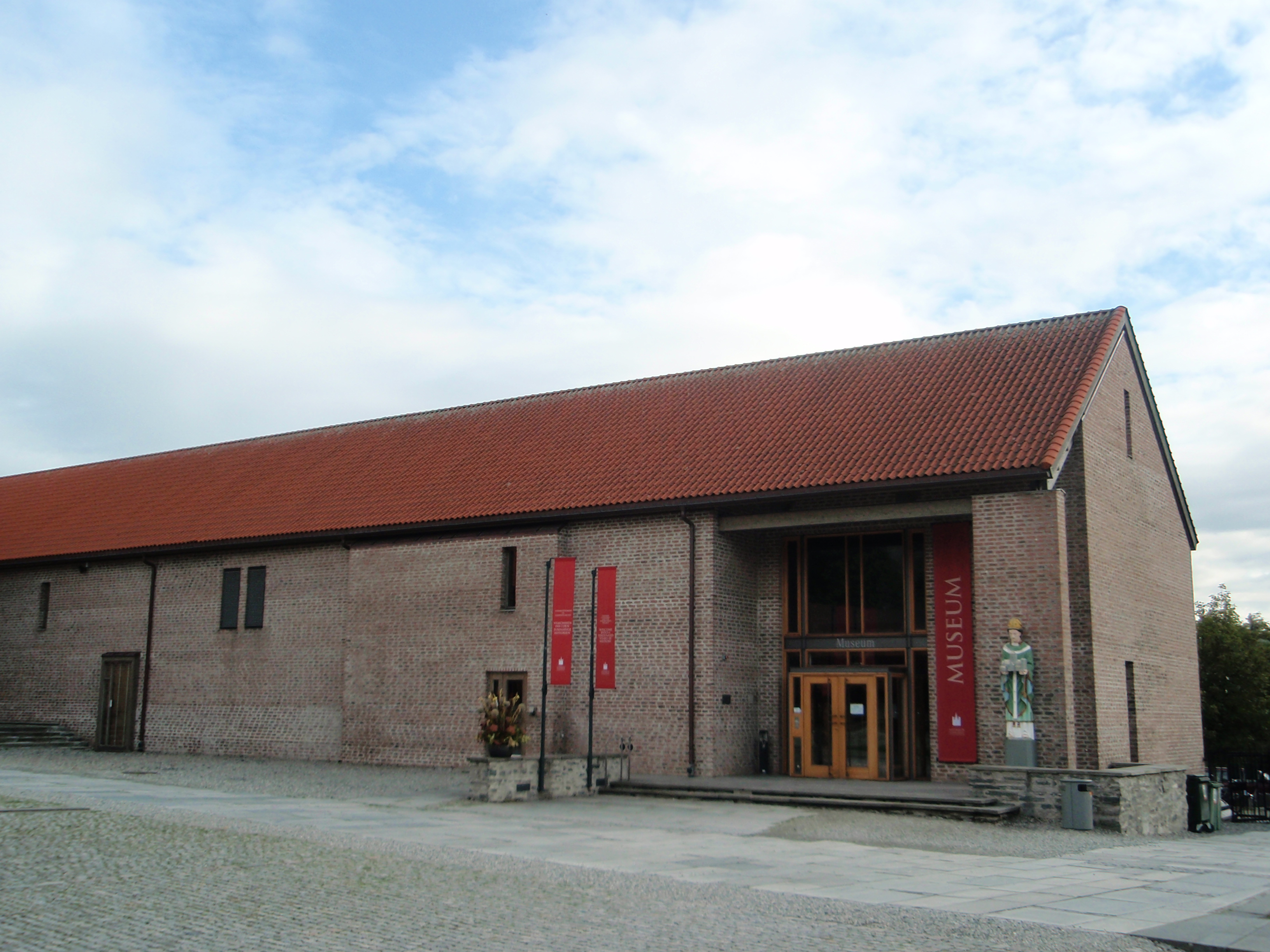
Entrance to the castle museum

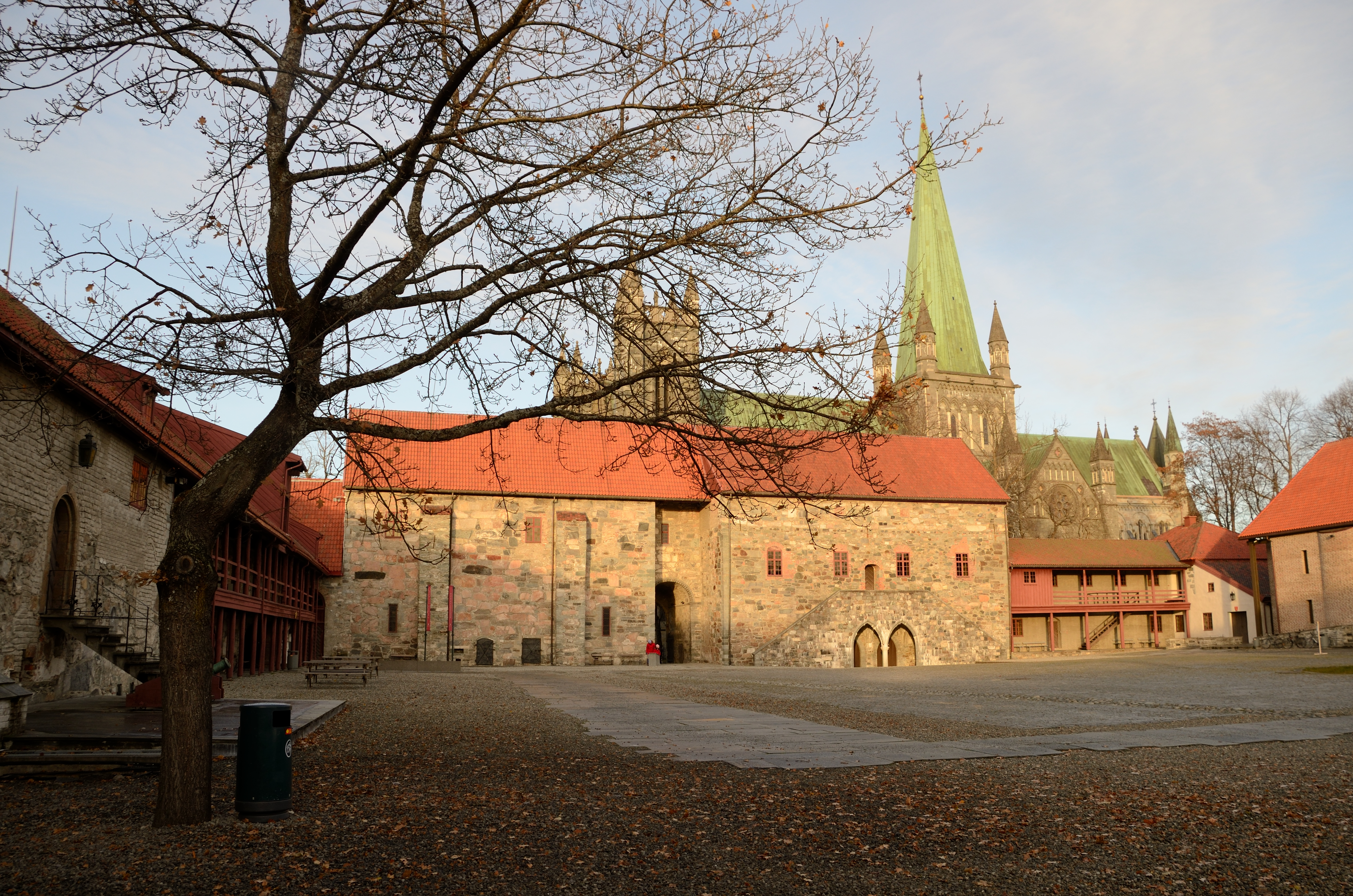
The castle with the Nidaros cathedral in the background

== Literature ==
- Bakke, Erling: Erkebispegården. Nordens eldste profane bygning, Trondheim 1977.
- Fischer, Dorothea og Gerhard: Erkebispegård – Kongsgård. Arkeologisk oppdagerarbeid 1952–72 i Fortidsminneforeningens Årbok 1975, pages 3–40.
- Nordeide, Sæbjørg Walaker: Erkebispegården i Trondheim. Beste tomta i by'n. Trondheim 2003, page 379. ISBN 82-8101-001-0
