= Nic Schiøll =

Norwegian sculptor (1901–1984)

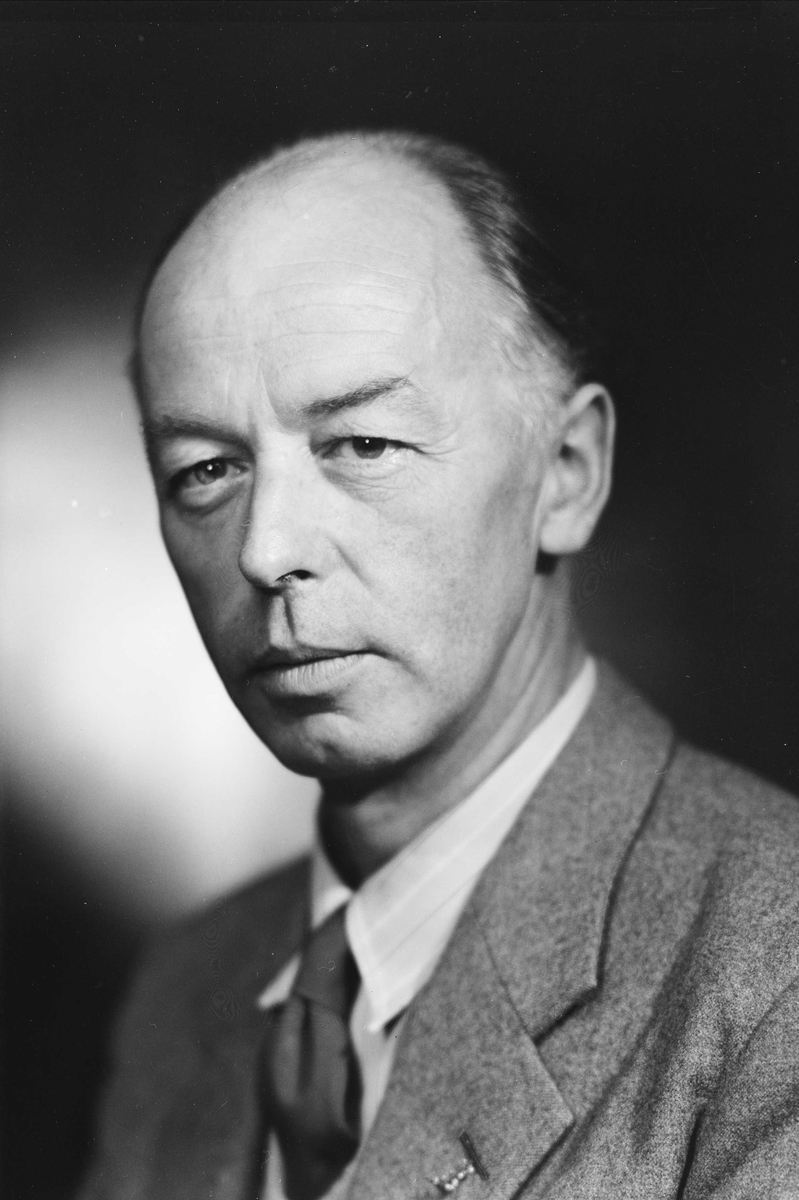
Nic Schiøll

Nicolai Marius "Nic" Schiøll (10 October 1901 – 29 December 1984) was a Norwegian sculptor and painter. He was most known for his public works, ornamental sculptures and memorials.

== Biography ==
Schiøll was born in Kristiania (now Oslo), Norway. He was the son of Marius Larsen Schiøll (1870-1920) and Karen Louise Ødegaard (1874-1944). He graduated artium at Frogner School in 1920. He trained under professor Wilhelm Rasmussen at the Norwegian National Academy of Craft and Art Industry. From 1923-24, he worked in Paris with Antoine Bourdelle.

Schiøll was affiliated with the restoration of Nidaros Cathedral from 1927-36. He designed nine sculptures for the Nidaros Cathedral West Front. He most notable work is the relief of St. Halvard at the southern wall of the Oslo City Hall. Among his other sculptural works are Grekeren from 1924 at the National Gallery and World War II memorials in Stavern and Odda. In 1945, Schiøll's six-meter-high monument for missionary Paul Olaf Bodding was unveiled at Gjøvik Church.

Schiøll was awarded the Henrichsens legat and Conrad Mohrs legat in 1928. He was a member of the supervisory board of Kunstnernes Hus in Oslo 1937-45. He was awarded 1st prize in the competition to decorate the south wall of Oslo City Hall in 1938. For his artistic work, he was awarded the King's Medal of Merit in gold in 1950 and Nidaros Cathedral medal in gold in 1969. From 1937 until his death, he had his studio at his home in the borough of Røa in Oslo. He died during 1984 and was buried in the cemetery of Ullern Church in Oslo.
