= Kristofer Leirdal =

Norwegian sculptor and art educator

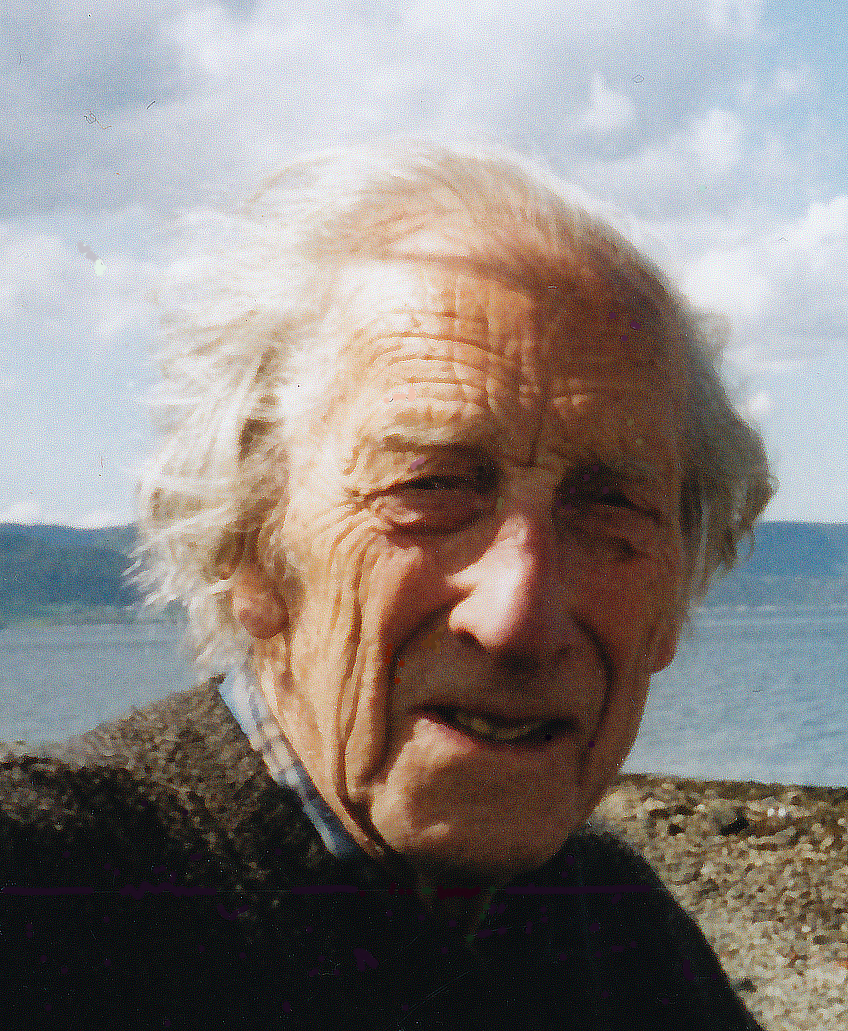
- Born: 15 December 1915; Aure, Norway
- Died: 6 July 2010 (aged 94); Trondheim, Norway
- Occupation: sculptor
- Children: Eli Carina Dragland, Bendik Thiis Leirdal, Yngve Zakarias and Erlend Leirdal

Kristofer Leirdal (15 December 1915– 6 July 2010) was a Norwegian sculptor and art educator. He was especially noted for his sculptural contributions to the restoration of the Nidaros Cathedral.

== Biography ==
Leirdal was born in Aure Municipality in Romsdalen county, Norway. He was the son of Sakarias Skogan (1880-1951) and Karen Leirdal (1883-1966).

He received his education at the Norwegian National Academy of Craft and Art Industry from 1936 to 1938 and at the Norwegian National Academy of Fine Arts under Professor Wilhelm Rasmussen between 1938 and 1940. He also was trained at the Royal Danish Academy of Fine Arts in Copenhagen under Professor Einar Utzon-Frank from 1945 to 1946.

Leirdal worked as a sculptor at Nidaros Cathedral in Trondheim from 1941. He was a classically trained sculptor who was also adapted at the physical and stylistic frameworks of architecture. In 1990 Leirdal completed his last work at the cathedral. Leirdal participated the founding of Trondheim Academy of Fine Art and was an instructor in the sculpture class from 1946 to 1945. He was also a teacher at the Department of Design and Color at the Architectural Department of the Norwegian Institute of Technology from 1952 to 1982.

Leirdal was active in the development of Trondheim Art Association. He was awarded the Benneches legat (1940), Statens stipend (1942) and Mohrs legat (1947). He received the Minnemedaljen in silver from the Royal Norwegian Society of Sciences and Letters (1965) and the Domkirkemedaljen in gold (198). In 1997 he was made Knight, First Class, of the Royal Norwegian Order of St. Olav.

He died in Trondheim in 2010.
