= Gunnar Danbolt =

Norwegian art historian

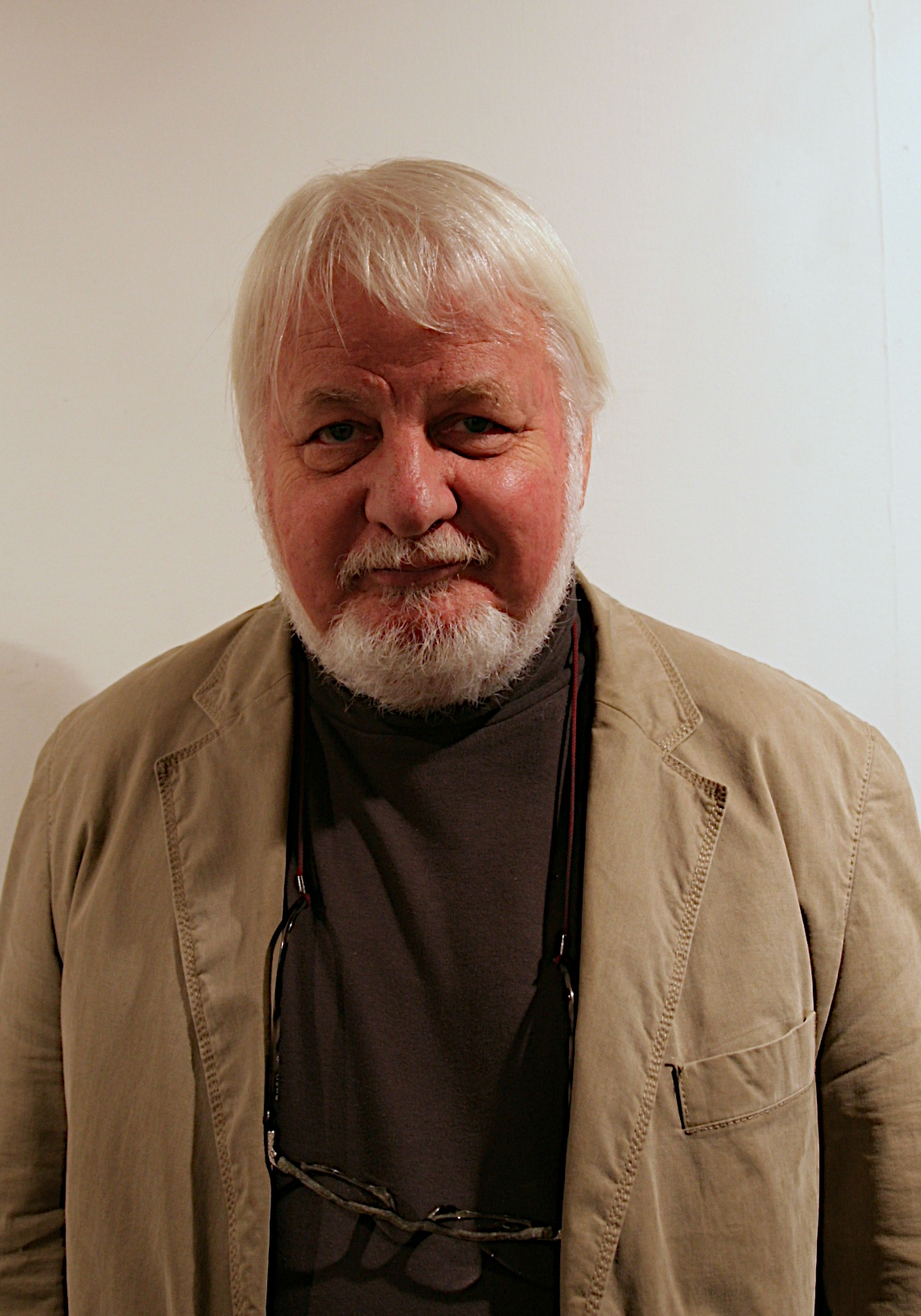
Gunnar Danbolt, 2007.

Gunnar Danbolt (born 9 March 1940) is a Norwegian art historian.

He was born in Bergen, the son of merchant Odd Gauslaa Danbolt (1902–1991) and Astrid A. Knudsen (1903–1996). In 1968, he married art historian Hjørdis Hauge.

He graduated from the University of Bergen with the cand.mag. degree in 1968, and took the mag.art. degree (PhD equivalent) in 1971. He was a research assistant at the University of Bergen from 1972 to 1973 and NAVF fellow from 1973 to 1976. He was a research fellow at the University of Bergen from 1976 to 1978, docent from 1979 to 1984 and professor from 1984 to his retirement. From 1985 to 1986 he was a visiting fellow at Clare Hall, Cambridge.

He was a board member of the National Gallery of Norway from 1983 to 1987, the Norwegian Museum of Contemporary Art from 1994 and of the Arts Council Norway from 1992 to 1996. He was decorated with the Royal Norwegian Order of St. Olav in 2007.
