= List of villages in Trøndelag =

This is a list of villages in Trøndelag, a county of Norway. For other counties see the lists of villages in Norway. The list excludes towns and cities located in Trøndelag. Villages that are the administrative centre of their municipality are marked (†).

Place	Coordinates	Postal Code	Municipality
Abelvær	64°43′46″N 11°10′48″E	7950	Nærøysund
Agdenes	63°38′40″N 9°44′16″E	7318	Orkland
Agle	64°16′34″N 12°31′22″E	7760	Snåsa
Alstadhaug	63°43′26″N 11°13′30″E	7620	Levanger
Andersskogan	63°27′40″N 8°19′39″E	7243	Hitra
Ansnes	63°38′16″N 8°59′40″E	7241	Hitra
Askjem	63°30′28″N 9°59′50″E	7105	Indre Fosen
Asp	64°03′46″N 11°29′34″E	7724	Steinkjer
Aunegrenda	62°57′12″N 11°15′27″E	7383	Holtålen
Aunet	63°03′18″N 11°34′07″E	7590	Tydal
Austafjord	64°55′02″N 10°56′23″E	7900	Nærøysund
Austrått	63°42′19″N 9°44′45″E	7140	Ørland
Badstuvika	63°32′08″N 09°08′23″E	7246	Hitra
Bangsund	64°23′41″N 11°23′44″E	7822	Namsos
Bartnes	64°03′30″N 11°14′35″E	7730	Steinkjer
Beistadgrenda	63°28′46″N 10°59′51″E	7500	Stjørdal
Beitstad	64°05′08″N 11°21′41″E	7730	Steinkjer
Bergbygda	63°42′24″N 10°45′50″E	7120	Indre Fosen
Berglia	64°12′50″N 13°35′09″E	7884	Lierne
Bergsmoen	64°28′02″N 12°13′12″E	7870	Grong
Berkåk (†)	62°49′29″N 10°00′42″E	7391	Rennebu
Bessaker	64°14′43″N 10°19′24″E	7190	Åfjord
Binde	64°05′25″N 11°42′39″E	7717	Steinkjer
Bjugn (†)	63°45′33″N 9°44′06″E	7160	Ørland
Bjørklia	63°16′24″N 10°32′49″E	7540	Trondheim
Bjørnli	63°07′49″N 09°40′20″E	7332	Orkland
Bogøyvær	63°52′21″N 8°32′58″E	7282	Frøya
Borgan	64°58′10″N 10°54′26″E	7900	Nærøysund
Brandsfjord	64°11′16″N 10°25′16″E	7194	Åfjord
Brannan	63°46′21″N 11°28′44″E	7650	Verdal
Bratsberg	63°20′58″N 10°29′07″E	7039	Trondheim
Brekka	63°18′59″N 10°11′46″E	7350	Skaun
Brekken (Brekkebygd)	62°38′50″N 11°52′20″E	7370	Røros
Brekkvasselv	64°50′41″N 13°00′40″E	7896	Namsskogan
Bremneset	63°44′20″N 08°38′07″E	7270	Frøya
Buvika/Ilhaugen	63°18′42″N 10°11′11″E	7350	Skaun
By	63°58′58″N 10°25′18″E	7170	Åfjord
Byafossen	64°02′13″N 11°33′14″E	7716	Steinkjer
Byneset	63°22′35″N 10°08′11″E	7074	Trondheim
Børsa (†)	63°19′36″N 10°04′09″E	7353	Skaun
Dalbygda	63°42′33″N 10°38′10″E	7120	Indre Fosen
Danielshaugen	63°21′25″N 10°46′45″E	7550	Malvik
Denstad	63°35′16″N 10°04′45″E	7100	Indre Fosen
Djupfest	63°46′48″N 9°34′39″E	7165	Ørland
Draksten	63°17′00″N 10°40′29″E	7036	Selbu
Driva	62°31′52″N 9°37′20″E	7340	Oppdal
Drogsetmoen	63°07′06″N 09°36′42″E	7334	Orkland
Dun	64°39′31″N 11°15′58″E	7856	Namsos
Dyrvik	63°44′36″N 08°49′57″E	7270	Frøya
Eggkleiva	63°16′54″N 10°02′59″E	7355	Skaun
Eidet	63°14′09″N 09°02′14″E	7200	Heim
Eidet	64°26′30″N 13°38′17″E	7882	Lierne
Ekne	63°41′48″N 11°02′26″E	7624	Levanger
Elvran	63°23′06″N 11°04′41″E	7519	Stjørdal
Engan	62°29′04″N 09°34′42″E	7340	Oppdal
Enodden (Budal)	62°53′03″N 10°29′00″E	7298	Midtre Gauldal
Ervika (Ærvik)	63°44′55″N 08°49′58″E	7270	Frøya
Fagerhaug	62°39′25″N 09°52′43″E	7340	Oppdal
Fagerli	63°25′35″N 10°57′34″E	7517	Stjørdal
Faksdal	64°38′24″N 11°15′01″E	7856	Namsos
Fannrem	63°15′59″N 9°48′57″E	7320	Orkland
Feragen	62°34′19″N 11°50′29″E	7374	Røros
Fevåg	63°40′37″N 09°51′04″E	7110	Indre Fosen
Fillan (†)	63°36′22″N 08°58′10″E	7240	Hitra
Fillingsneset	63°39′55″N 08°29′58″E	7263	Frøya
Finnanger	64°37′14″N 11°08′43″E	7819	Namsos
Flatval	63°41′22″N 08°45′35″E	7263	Frøya
Fleskhus	63°49′19″N 11°26′48″E	7650	Verdal
Flora	63°06′40″N 11°18′28″E	7596	Selbu
Flornes	63°27′28″N 11°21′02″E	7525	Stjørdal
Flå	62°50′10″N 09°55′34″E	7392	Rennebu
Flått	64°41′34″N 12°20′00″E	7977	Høylandet
Foldereid	64°57′40″N 12°10′46″E	7985	Nærøysund
Follafoss	63°59′08″N 11°06′39″E	7796	Steinkjer
Forbregd/Lein	63°48′37″N 11°33′13″E	7650	Verdal
Formofoss	64°24′01″N 12°20′42″E	7870	Grong
Forsnes	63°25′55″N 08°24′51″E	7246	Hitra
Fossan	63°16′14″N 11°00′38″E	7584	Selbu
Fosslandsosen	64°32′29″N 11°15′59″E	7819	Namsos
Framverran	63°52′45″N 10°59′53″E	7690	Inderøy
Frengen	63°41′53″N 09°55′04″E	7110	Indre Fosen
Froan	63°59′59″N 9°10′29″E	7287	Frøya
Frosta (†)	63°35′13″N 10°45′14″E	7633	Frosta
Følling	64°06′11″N 11°32′40″E	7732	Steinkjer
Galåa	62°33′20″N 11°17′12″E	7374	Røros
Gangstad	63°57′13″N 11°19′52″E	7670	Inderøy
Garnes	63°44′19″N 11°45′15″E	7660	Verdal
Garstad	64°52′49″N 10°57′15″E	7900	Nærøysund
Garten	63°38′34″N 09°31′17″E	7153	Ørland
Gartland	64°32′00″N 12°23′34″E	7873	Grong
Gaulstad	63°58′41″N 12°06′48″E	7718	Steinkjer
Geitastrand	63°21′54″N 09°55′31″E	7300	Orkland
Gimse	63°17′12″N 10°16′11″E	7227	Melhus
Gjerdinga	64°56′42″N 11°26′24″E	7973	Nærøysund
Gjersvika	64°51′34″N 13°24′45″E	7898	Røyrvik
Gjæsingen	63°55′44″N 8°54′01″E	7285	Frøya
Gjølga	63°47′16″N 09°58′56″E	7160	Ørland
Glåmos	62°40′22″N 11°25′26″E	7372	Røros
Graftåsen	62°49′32″N 11°21′03″E	7380	Holtålen
Gravvik	64°59′24″N 11°46′07″E	7990	Nærøysund
Grefstad	63°05′44″N 9°41′49″E	7332	Orkland
Gressli	63°03′49″N 11°27′24″E	7590	Tydal
Grong	64°27′53″N 12°18′58″E	7870	Grong
Grostad	63°26′56″N 09°53′07″E	7316	Orkland
Grungstad	64°36′21″N 12°14′46″E	7977	Høylandet
Gudåa	63°26′36″N 11°37′12″E	7530	Meråker
Gåsbakken	63°06′49″N 09°59′07″E	7213	Melhus
Haltdalen	62°55′35″N 11°08′26″E	7383	Holtålen
Hallem	63°48′35″N 11°35′06″E	7650	Verdal
Halsanaustan	63°04′06″N 8°13′40″E	6680	Heim
Hammarvika	63°41′48″N 08°48′25″E	7263	Frøya
Harran	64°33′36″N 12°29′06″E	7873	Grong
Harsvika	64°02′52″N 10°00′52″E	7178	Åfjord
Hasselvika	63°37′56″N 9°49′34″E	7112	Indre Fosen
Hasvåg	64°26′41″N 10°35′56″E	7746	Flatanger
Haug	63°47′46″N 11°30′55″E	7650	Verdal
Hårberg	63°41′49″N 9°38′26″E	7130	Ørland
Hegra	63°27′50″N 11°06′51″E	7520	Stjørdal
Heim	63°25′08″N 09°04′56″E	7206	Heim
Hell	63°26′40″N 10°55′21″E	7517	Stjørdal
Hellandsjøen	63°24′13″N 8°58′51″E	7206	Heim
Hemnskjela	63°30′02″N 09°09′42″E	7256	Hitra
Hepsøya	64°19′14″N 10°22′24″E	7744	Osen
Hessdalen	62°47′36″N 11°11′18″E	7380	Holtålen
Hestvika	63°34′00″N 09°11′45″E	7247	Hitra
Hitterdalen	62°36′36″N 11°38′13″E	7374	Røros
Hoflesja	64°49′41″N 11°36′42″E	7970	Nærøysund
Hofstad	64°11′48″N 10°24′09″E	7194	Åfjord
Holand	64°26′47″N 13°42′28″E	7882	Lierne
Holla	63°18′37″N 09°07′56″E	7200	Heim
Hommelvik (†)	63°24′38″N 10°47′39″E	7550	Malvik
Hongsand	64°08′41″N 10°09′43″E	7180	Åfjord
Hoston	63°11′42″N 09°35′03″E	7320	Orkland
Hovin	63°06′19″N 10°13′25″E	7236	Melhus
Hundhammeren	63°26′22″N 10°35′59″E	7562	Malvik
Hunn	64°28′02″N 11°45′23″E	7860	Overhalla
Husbysjøen	63°44′50″N 10°06′25″E	7113	Indre Fosen
Husdalen	63°21′41″N 09°52′40″E	7300	Orkland
Hylla	63°50′27″N 11°23′11″E	7670	Inderøy
Hyllbrua	63°59′43″N 11°51′55″E	7718	Steinkjer
Hyttbakken	63°12′05″N 11°07′58″E	7580	Selbu
Høybakken	63°44′10″N 09°52′22″E	7160	Ørland
Høylandet (†)	64°37′43″N 12°18′07″E	7977	Høylandet
Inderdal	64°11′01″N 13°43′49″E	7884	Lierne
Indre Skjervøya	64°17′19″N 10°17′39″E	7742	Osen
Ingdalen	63°27′35″N 09°54′55″E	7316	Orkland
Innbygda	63°14′30″N 11°05′18″E	7580	Selbu
Inner-Råkvågen	63°46′24″N 10°05′50″E	7114	Indre Fosen
Innset	62°43′08″N 10°02′28″E	7398	Rennebu
Innstrand	63°43′51″N 09°39′04″E	7140	Ørland
Inntian	63°43′18″N 08°52′40″E	7260	Frøya
Innvorda	64°34′51″N 11°00′57″E	7777	Flatanger
Jule	64°10′07″N 13°51′14″E	7884	Lierne
Julsborg	63°44′11″N 11°14′25″E	7600	Levanger
Jørem	64°27′20″N 12°11′22″E	7870	Grong
Jørstad	64°12′07″N 12°14′13″E	7760	Snåsa
Jøssund	63°50′44″N 09°47′40″E	7167	Ørland
Jøssund	64°21′45″N 10°49′27″E	7745	Flatanger
Jåren	63°15′30″N 9°58′48″E	7357	Skaun
Kjerknesvågen	63°54′40″N 11°11′24″E	7670	Inderøy
Kjerringvika	63°50′29″N 11°04′07″E	7690	Inderøy
Kjerringvåg	63°39′04″N 08°46′39″E	7252	Hitra
Kjøra	63°25′01″N 09°57′42″E	7300	Orkland
Kjørkbyen	63°26′41″N 11°39′03″E	7530	Meråker
Klinga	64°24′35″N 11°28′56″E	7820	Namsos
Klæbu	63°17′51″N 10°28′57″E	7540	Trondheim
Knarrlaget	63°39′52″N 09°04′53″E	7242	Hitra
Kongsmoen	64°52′56″N 12°26′12″E	7976	Høylandet
Kongensvollen	63°33′12″N 9°23′50″E	7255	Hitra
Kopperå	63°23′33″N 11°50′22″E	7533	Meråker
Korsvegen	63°09′39″N 10°05′57″E	7212	Melhus
Kotsøy	62°58′44″N 10°33′52″E	7387	Midtre Gauldal
Krokstadøra	63°24′00″N 09°30′03″E	7257	Orkland
Kråkvåg	63°38′38″N 9°19′38″E	7152	Ørland
Kvaløyseteren	64°28′18″N 10°42′12″E	7770	Flatanger
Kvam	64°08′26″N 11°44′20″E	7732	Steinkjer
Kvelia	64°31′18″N 13°41′13″E	7882	Lierne
Kvemoen	64°30′36″N 13°49′06″E	7882	Lierne
Kvenvær	63°31′58″N 08°23′26″E	7243	Hitra
Kverva	63°42′20″N 08°32′00″E	7266	Frøya
Kvithammar	63°29′27″N 10°53′21″E	7500	Stjørdal
Kvithylla	63°33′33″N 09°54′34″E	7100	Indre Fosen
Kvål	63°13′53″N 10°16′50″E	7228	Melhus
Kyrksæterøra (†)	63°17′26″N 09°05′20″E	7200	Heim
Langstein	64°32′50″N 10°54′05″E	7510	Stjørdal
Langørjan	63°25′12″N 10°08′31″E	7070	Trondheim
Lauvsnes (†)	64°30′02″N 10°53′38″E	7770	Flatanger
Ledang	64°30′39″N 11°06′21″E	7777	Namsos
Leira	63°35′56″N 9°59′53″E	7100	Indre Fosen
Leirbakken	64°31′51″N 13°32′27″E	7898	Lierne
Leka	65°05′19″N 11°42′34″E	7994	Leka
Leknes (†)	65°05′52″N 11°42′03″E	7994	Leka
Leksa	63°34′35″N 09°19′28″E	7156	Orkland
Leksdalen	63°48′59″N 11°41′00″E	7650	Verdal
Leksvik	63°40′20″N 10°37′50″E	7120	Indre Fosen
Lensvik	63°30′49″N 09°48′22″E	7315	Orkland
Ler	63°11′52″N 10°18′10″E	7234	Melhus
Lereggen	63°16′01″N 10°11′51″E	7350	Skaun
Lerkehaug	63°59′33″N 11°29′58″E	7711	Steinkjer
Lia	63°47′02″N 9°48′36″E	7160	Ørland
Liabøen	63°07′21″N 8°18′57″E	6683	Heim
Limingen	64°44′25″N 13°40′43″E	7898	Lierne
Lines	64°00′20″N 09°56′03″E	7176	Åfjord
Linneset	63°03′52″N 14°00′51″E	7884	Lierne
Logtun	63°34′03″N 10°42′08″E	7633	Frosta
Lund	64°46′01″N 11°36′30″E	7818	Namsos
Lundamo	63°09′07″N 10°17′04″E	7232	Melhus
Lyngsnes	64°58′13″N 11°05′19″E	7900	Nærøysund
Lysthaugen	63°45′41″N 11°37′19″E	7650	Verdal
Lysøysundet	63°53′01″N 09°51′52″E	7168	Ørland
Løkken Verk	63°07′32″N 09°42′17″E	7332	Orkland
Lønset	62°35′00″N 9°20′38″E	7342	Oppdal
Madsøygrenda	65°03′56″N 11°41′42″E	7994	Leka
Malm	64°04′19″N 11°13′01″E	7790	Steinkjer
Malvik	63°25′58″N 10°40′22″E	7563	Malvik
Markabygd	64°38′32″N 11°16′41″E	7622	Levanger
Mausund	63°52′06″N 8°40′02″E	7284	Frøya
Mebonden (†)	63°13′45″N 11°01′53″E	7580	Selbu
Medjå (†)	64°27′50″N 12°18′51″E	7870	Grong
Melandsjøen	63°37′44″N 08°43′48″E	7250	Hitra
Melby	63°14′10″N 9°59′03″E	7357	Skaun
Meldal	63°02′50″N 9°42′48″E	7336	Orkland
Melen	64°26′37″N 11°48′50″E	7860	Overhalla
Melhus (†)	63°17′07″N 10°16′41″E	7224	Melhus
Midtbygda (†)	63°24′50″N 11°44′34″E	7530	Meråker
Midtsandan	63°25′47″N 10°43′49″E	7563	Malvik
Mo	63°36′01″N 10°03′15″E	7100	Indre Fosen
Momarka	63°43′39″N 11°17′03″E	7600	Levanger
Mosvik	63°49′03″N 11°00′20″E	7690	Inderøy
Mule	63°45′24″N 11°23′36″E	7600	Levanger
Muruvika	63°25′57″N 10°49′40″E	7550	Malvik
Mære	63°56′14″N 11°25′26″E	7710	Steinkjer
Måneset	64°56′19″N 11°28′15″E	7970	Nærøysund
Måsøyvalen	63°42′31″N 8°30′30″E	7266	Frøya
Namdalseid	64°13′20″N 11°13′16″E	7750	Namsos
Namsskogan (†)	64°55′43″N 13°09′34″E	7890	Namsskogan
Nedre Tennel	63°29′07″N 9°50′46″E	7316	Orkland
Nerskogen	62°46′59″N 9°36′30″E	7393	Rennebu
Nes	63°46′17″N 09°35′08″E	7165	Ørland
Neset	63°46′10″N 08°49′00″E	7270	Frøya
Nesset	63°44′39″N 11°14′45″E	7600	Levanger
Nordbotn	63°38′49″N 09°08′17″E	7242	Hitra
Norddyrøya	63°47′58″N 8°41′52″E	7273	Frøya
Nordfjæra	63°33′54″N 10°40′31″E	7633	Frosta
Nordskaget	63°42′23″N 08°33′30″E	7266	Frøya
Nufsfjord	64°36′14″N 11°23′48″E	7800	Namsos
Nypan (Leinstrand)	63°19′30″N 10°18′26″E	7083	Trondheim
Nærøy	64°49′47″N 11°13′12″E	7944	Nærøysund
Ofstad	64°52′37″N 11°06′10″E	7900	Nærøysund
Ogndal	64°01′11″N 11°37′52″E	7718	Steinkjer
Okkenhaug	63°43′40″N 11°27′04″E	7600	Levanger
Oksvoll	63°48′53″N 9°40′51″E	7165	Ørland
Olden	63°52′10″N 09°55′56″E	7168	Ørland
Oppdal (†)	62°35′39″N 09°41′28″E	7340	Oppdal
Opphaug	63°43′37″N 09°41′24″E	7140	Ørland
Oppland	64°20′16″N 10°51′54″E	7745	Flatanger
Osen (†)	64°17′51″N 10°30′38″E	7740	Osen
Ottersbo	63°42′00″N 09°46′00″E	7140	Ørland
Ottersøya	64°51′22″N 11°17′21″E	7940	Nærøysund
Prestmoen	63°26′58″N 10°58′05″E	7500	Stjørdal
Ramsvika	64°30′59″N 11°29′19″E	7800	Namsos
Ranemsletta (†)	64°29′40″N 11°56′56″E	7863	Overhalla
Ratvika	63°58′35″N 10°00′25″E	7170	Åfjord
Reinsgrenda	63°32′56″N 9°55′31″E	7105	Indre Fosen
Reitstøa	62°57′42″N 10°51′55″E	7387	Midtre Gauldal
Renbygda (†)	62°50′28″N 11°19′15″E	7380	Holtålen
Rennebu	62°52′33″N 09°50′01″E	7393	Rennebu
Revsnes	64°02′15″N 10°03′08″E	7177	Åfjord
Rindal (†)	63°03′23″N 9°12′45″E	6657	Rindal
Ringvål	63°21′10″N 10°15′03″E	7089	Trondheim
Rinnan	63°45′43″N 11°26′23″E	7600	Levanger
Roan	64°10′21″N 10°13′44″E	7180	Åfjord
Rognes	63°00′25″N 10°27′09″E	7295	Midtre Gauldal
Romundstad	63°01′34″N 9°19′42″E	6657	Rindal
Ronglan	63°40′01″N 11°06′59″E	7623	Levanger
Rye	63°25′21″N 10°08′51″E	7070	Trondheim
Røra	63°51′27″N 11°24′00″E	7670	Inderøy
Rørvik (†)	64°51′43″N 11°14′14″E	7900	Nærøysund
Rørvika	63°30′33″N 10°08′00″E	7105	Indre Fosen
Røstad	63°45′14″N 11°18′43″E	7600	Levanger
Røyrvik (Norwegian) (†); Raarvihke (Southern Sami)	64°53′02″N 13°33′45″E	7898	Røyrvik
Råbygda	63°18′36″N 09°48′50″E	7310	Orkland
Råbygda i Skaun	63°13′49″N 9°59′01″E	7357	Skaun
Råkvåg	63°45′45″N 10°04′40″E	7114	Indre Fosen
Sakshaug	63°52′35″N 11°16′01″E	7670	Inderøy
Salsbruket	64°47′58″N 11°52′00″E	7960	Nærøysund
Salsnes	64°41′24″N 11°26′22″E	7817	Namsos
Sandnes	63°51′03″N 9°45′29″E	7167	Ørland
Sandstad	63°31′24″N 09°06′01″E	7246	Hitra
Sandvika	63°45′07″N 08°40′46″E	7270	Frøya
Sandvika (†)	64°27′56″N 13°35′30″E	7882	Lierne
Sandviksberget	64°19′32″N 10°27′01″E	7740	Osen
Sela	64°00′17″N 10°47′36″E	7796	Steinkjer
Selbekken	63°30′12″N 09°49′25″E	7316	Orkland
Selnes	63°54′32″N 9°58′25″E	7170	Åfjord
Selbu	63°12′59″N 11°02′31″E	7580	Selbu
Selbustrand	63°14′56″N 10°57′19″E	7584	Selbu
Sem	63°54′50″N 11°33′36″E	7710	Steinkjer
Seter	63°34′23″N 10°24′08″E	7125	Indre Fosen
Seter	64°23′34″N 10°29′24″E	7748	Osen
Setnan	63°23′34″N 10°59′50″E	7519	Stjørdal
Singsås	62°57′22″N 10°43′50″E	7387	Midtre Gauldal
Sistranda (†)	63°43′31″N 08°50′02″E	7260	Frøya
Sjøbygda	63°14′31″N 10°49′35″E	7580	Selbu
Sjøåsen	64°18′35″N 11°13′29″E	7750	Namsos
Skatval	63°30′39″N 10°48′59″E	7510	Stjørdal
Skaun	63°14′57″N 10°03′28″E	7357	Skaun
Skei	64°01′11″N 11°37′52″E	7718	Steinkjer
Skiljås	64°28′47″N 11°48′02″E	7860	Overhalla
Skjelstad	63°30′20″N 11°07′05″E	7520	Stjørdal
Skjølågrinda	63°58′40″N 11°55′08″E	7718	Steinkjer
Skogmo	64°30′30″N 12°00′46″E	7863	Overhalla
Skogn	63°42′03″N 11°11′12″E	7620	Levanger
Skomsvoll	64°30′57″N 11°17′08″E	7819	Namsos
Skorovatn	64°38′32″N 13°06′50″E	7893	Namsskogan
Skorstad	64°34′40″N 11°12′20″E	7819	Namsos
Skåle	64°09′50″N 13°52′20″E	7884	Lierne
Slottet	63°32′37″N 10°48′48″E	7510	Stjørdal
Smalåsen	64°04′47″N 13°19′03″E	7890	Namsskogan
Smiskaret	63°25′44″N 10°44′38″E	7563	Malvik
Småland	63°35′49″N 10°42′28″E	7633	Frosta
Småland	63°57′45″N 11°18′20″E	7670	Inderøy
Småland	63°41′42″N 11°11′55″E	7620	Levanger
Sneisen	63°20′06″N 10°48′35″E	7550	Malvik
Snøan	62°59′15″N 10°14′24″E	7288	Midtre Gauldal
Snåsa (Norwegian) (†); Snåase (Southern Sami)	64°14′44″N 12°22′54″E	7760	Snåsa
Soknedal	62°57′04″N 10°11′18″E	7288	Midtre Gauldal
Sona	63°26′30″N 11°15′13″E	7520	Stjørdal
Songmoen	63°17′56″N 9°39′27″E	7320	Orkland
Sparbu	63°55′08″N 11°25′58″E	7710	Steinkjer
Spillum	64°26′44″N 11°31′33″E	7820	Namsos
Spongdal	63°21′20″N 10°09′59″E	7074	Trondheim
Stadsbygd	63°30′35″N 10°01′10″E	7105	Indre Fosen
Stallvika	63°45′21″N 9°58′26″E	7160	Ørland
Stallvika	64°39′38″N 13°11′31″E	7893	Røyrvik
Stamnan	62°50′56″N 09°51′23″E	7392	Rennebu
Statland	64°29′48″N 11°08′50″E	7777	Namsos
Steine	64°45′17″N 11°18′19″E	7970	Nærøysund
Steinsdalen	64.2386°N 10.6922°E	7740	Osen
Stensli	62°51′05″N 11°14′30″E	7383	Holtålen
Stiklestad	63°47′46″N 11°33′38″E	7660	Verdal
Stod	64°04′16″N 11°40′05″E	7717	Steinkjer
Stoksund	64°02′16″N 10°03′32″E	7177	Åfjord
Storbergvika	64°06′07″N 14°00′34″E	7884	Lierne
Storfosna	63°39′47″N 9°24′10″E	7150	Ørland
Stordalen	63°17′49″N 11°51′22″E	7533	Meråker
Storhallaren	63°40′30″N 08°36′02″E	7263	Frøya
Storlia	62°41′37″N 09°06′12″E	7340	Oppdal
Storsand	63°16′03″N 10°17′27″E	7224	Melhus
Storås	63°05′45″N 09°35′49″E	7334	Orkland
Strandvalen	64°48′27″N 11°26′26″E	7970	Nærøysund
Straum	64°10′23″N 10°22′29″E	7194	Åfjord
Straumen (†)	63°52′15″N 11°17′59″E	7670	Inderøy
Strømøya	63°46′42″N 08°46′32″E	7270	Frøya
Stugguneset	64°09′12″N 14°01′10″E	7884	Lierne
Stugudalen	62°54′29″N 11°53′34″E	7590	Tydal
Støren (†)	63°02′21″N 10°17′06″E	7290	Midtre Gauldal
Sul	63°39′53″N 12°00′32″E	7660	Verdal
Sula	63°50′45″N 8°27′26″E	7280	Frøya
Sundnes	63°52′12″N 11°15′15″E	7670	Inderøy
Sunnan	64°04′43″N 11°37′43″E	7717	Steinkjer
Svalia	64°30′20″N 11°56′28″E	7863	Overhalla
Svorkmo	63°10′11″N 9°44′33″E	7327	Orkland
Sørdyrøya	63°47′03″N 8°38′33″E	7273	Frøya
Sørfjorden	63°45′19″N 10°08′42″E	7113	Indre Fosen
Sørgrenda	63°32′43″N 10°40′39″E	7633	Frosta
Sør-Gutvika	64°05′03″N 11°50′15″E	7993	Leka
Sørli	64°13′26″N 13°49′57″E	7884	Lierne
Sørlia	63°59′41″N 11°27′57″E	7712	Steinkjer
Søråa	64°52′39″N 11°25′22″E	7940	Nærøysund
Tanem	63°18′29″N 10°26′15″E	7549	Trondheim
Tannvikvågen	63°23′20″N 9°14′36″E	7257	Orkland
Tarva	63°48′07″N 9°24′55″E	7166	Ørland
Tautra	63°34′23″N 10°36′20″E	7633	Frosta
Tiset	63°05′54″N 9°19′29″E	6658	Rindal
Titran	63°40′06″N 08°18′22″E	7268	Frøya
Torstad	64°53′48″N 11°21′32″E	7940	Nærøysund
Totland	64°15′25″N 13°42′53″E	7884	Lierne
Trolla	63°27′05″N 10°18′35″E	7018	Trondheim
Trones	64°44′28″N 12°50′43″E	7892	Namsskogan
Trones	63°49′19″N 11°24′54″E	7650	Verdal
Trongsundet	63°50′02″N 10°41′44″E	7690	Inderøy
Trøa	63°12′57″N 10°57′15″E	7580	Selbu
Tunnsjøen	64°40′58″N 13°38′57″E	7898	Lierne
Tunnsjørørvika	64°47′42″N 13°23′28″E	7898	Røyrvik
Tunnsjø senter	64°38′41″N 13°42′01″E	7898	Lierne
Tverrås	64°05′48″N 11°14′29″E	7790	Steinkjer
Tømra	63°17′08″N 11°04′27″E	7584	Selbu
Tørhogg	63°57′58″N 09°58′54″E	7170	Åfjord
Tørrem	63°48′50″N 09°42′17″E	7165	Ørland
Tøttdalen	64°26′17″N 11°09′03″E	7777	Namsos
Uddu	63°35′15″N 9°55′34″E	7100	Indre Fosen
Ulsberg	62°45′05″N 9°59′05″E	7397	Rennebu
Ulvan	63°40′28″N 09°02′20″E	7242	Hitra
Uthaug	63°43′32″N 09°35′59″E	7142	Ørland
Uttian	63°46′12″N 08°52′49″E	7270	Frøya
Utvorda	64°35′36″N 10°57′29″E	7777	Flatanger
Utøy	63°51′26″N 11°7′40″E	7670	Inderøy
Val	63°49′48″N 9°40′33″E	7165	Ørland
Vallersund	63°51′38″N 9°44′58″E	7167	Ørland
Valsøybotnen	63°05′39″N 8°36′57″E	6686	Heim
Valsøyfjord	63°08′16″N 8°29′27″E	6687	Heim
Valøya	64°54′31″N 10°47′03″E	7900	Nærøysund
Vangshylla	63°50′22″N 11°05′30″E	7670	Inderøy
Vanvikan	63°33′09″N 10°12′35″E	7125	Indre Fosen
Varøya	64°48′36″N 11°20′52″E	7944	Nærøysund
Vassaunet	64°03′30″N 11°28′04″E	7724	Steinkjer
Vassbotna	64°33′11″N 12°10′57″E	7977	Høylandet
Vassbygda	63°37′10″N 9°38′15″E	7318	Orkland
Vassbygda	63°13′36″N 10°07′04″E	7350	Skaun
Vassbygda	63°29′53″N 10°57′06″E	7500	Stjørdal
Vekre (Henning)	63°57′40″N 11°35′51″E	7711	Steinkjer
Vellamelen	64°06′39″N 11°23′17″E	7730	Steinkjer
Velle	64°07′13″N 11°23′35″E	7730	Steinkjer
Venneshamn	63°52′28″N 11°02′19″E	7690	Inderøy
Vera	63°48′07″N 12°20′48″E	7660	Verdal
Verrabotn	63°48′09″N 10°34′47″E	7797	Indre Fosen
Verrastranda	63°54′09″N 10°54′37″E	7796	Steinkjer
Viggja	63°20′43″N 9°59′27″E	7354	Skaun
Vik	64°27′36″N 10°45′35″E	7770	Flatanger
Vikan	63°47′42″N 8°47′08″E	7270	Frøya
Vikhammer	63°26′14″N 10°37′36″E	7560	Malvik
Vikvarvet	63°12′48″N 10°57′18″E	7580	Selbu
Vindsetmoan	64°32′05″N 11°18′42″E	7819	Namsos
Vingan	63°30′58″N 9°16′56″E	7255	Hitra
Vingsand	64°20′50″N 10°27′46″E	7740	Osen
Vinjeøra	63°12′21″N 8°59′10″E	7203	Heim
Vinne	63°46′24″N 11°31′42″E	7650	Verdal
Viosen	64°15′02″N 12°22′05″E	7760	Snåsa
Vognillan	62°36′55″N 9°34′13″E	7343	Oppdal
Voll	62°52′35″N 9°50′25″E	7393	Rennebu
Vormstad	63°11′59″N 9°46′12″E	7327	Orkland
Vuku	63°46′34″N 11°44′21″E	7660	Verdal
Vutudal	63°20′42″N 09°25′43″E	7257	Orkland
Ytre Snillfjord	63°21′20″N 9°17′14″E	7257	Heim
Ytre Sørbygda	64°13′53″N 12°23′44″E	7760	Snåsa
Yttersian	63°44′12″N 8°49′55″E	7260	Frøya
Ytterøy	63°48′06″N 11°08′36″E	7629	Levanger
Østborg	64°06′33″N 13°58′58″E	7884	Lierne
Østby	63°03′13″N 11°40′16″E	7590	Tydal
Øvre Sørbygda	64°14′30″N 12°27′03″E	7760	Snåsa
Øyem	64°28′16″N 12°08′24″E	7870	Grong
Øysletta	64°27′44″N 12°03′02″E	7863	Overhalla
Å	62°59′07″N 09°44′17″E	7335	Orkland
Ålbu	62°36′38″N 09°29′51″E	7340	Oppdal
Årgård	64°16′16″N 11°11′28″E	7750	Namsos
Årnes (Å i Åfjord) (†)	63°57′40″N 10°13′33″E	7170	Åfjord
Årnset (Rissa) (†)	63°35′15″N 9°57′20″E	7100	Indre Fosen
Ås (†)	63°02′41″N 11°39′25″E	7590	Tydal
Åsen	63°36′29″N 11°03′06″E	7630	Levanger
