= Agdenes =

Agdenes may refer to:

== Places ==
- Agdenes Municipality, a former municipality in Trøndelag county, Norway
- Agdenes (village), a village in Orkland Municipality in Trøndelag county, Norway
- Agdenes Church, a church in Orkland Municipality in Trøndelag county, Norway
- Agdenes Lighthouse, a lighthouse in Orkland Municipality in Trøndelag county, Norway
- Agdenes (headland), a small peninsula in the Trondheimsfjorden in Orkland Municipality in Trøndelag county, Norway
- Agdenes Fort, a group of three historic forts along the Trondheimsfjorden in Trøndelag county, Norway
