= Sørfjorden, Indre Fosen =

Village in Indre Fosen Municipality, Norway

Sørfjorden Mælan
- Village area
- Interactive map of Sørfjorden
- Location within Trøndelag Location within Norway
- Coordinates: 63.7535°N 10.1371°E
- Country: Norway
- Region: Central Norway
- County: Trøndelag
- District: Fosen
- Municipality: Indre Fosen

Area
  - Total: 0.33 km^{2} (0.13 sq mi)
- Elevation: 4 m (13 ft)

Population (2014)
  - Total: 243
  - Density: 736.4/km^{2} (1,907/sq mi)
- Time zone: UTC+01:00 (CET)
  - Summer (DST): UTC+02:00 (CEST)
- Post Code: 7113 Husbysjøen

Sørfjorden or Mælan is a village in Indre Fosen Municipality in Trøndelag county, Norway. The village is located at the head of the Sørfjorden, an arm of the Stjørnfjorden. It is located about 4 kilometres (2.5 mi) southeast of the village of Råkvåg, about 1 kilometre (0.62 mi) east of Husbysjøen, about 22 kilometres (14 mi) northeast of the village of Hasselvika, and about 12 kilometres (7.5 mi) north of the lake Storvatnet. Ramsvik Church is located on the north shore of the fjord, just west of the village.

The 0.33-square-kilometre (82-acre) village (including neighboring Husbysjøen) had a population (2014) of 243 and a population density of 736.4 inhabitants per square kilometre (1,907/sq mi). Since 2014, the population and area data for this village area has not been separately tracked by Statistics Norway.
