= Uttrøndelagens Dampbaadsamlag =

Former transport company in Norway

- Type: Private
- Industry: Shipping
- Founded: 14 February 1891; 135 years ago
- Defunct: 14 December 1903
- Fate: Merged
- Successor: Fosen Aktie-Dampskibsselskab
- Headquarters: Trondheim, Norway
- Area served: Trondheimsfjord

Uttrøndelagens Dampbaadsamlag was a shipping company based in Trondheim, Norway. It operated scheduled steamship services on the Trondheimsfjord and onwards through Trondheimsleia in Fosen and Uttrøndelag.

The company was founded on 14 February 1891. It took order of its ship, SS Rein, which entered service in April 1892. It merged with its main competitor Hevne Dampskibsselskab on 14 December 1903 to form Fosen Aktie-Dampskibsselskab.

== History ==
The initiative for the company came from the same investors as were active in Børsens Dampskibsselskab. Based in Skaun Municipality, they had founded Børsens DS to start steamship services from Skaun to Trondheim. The company was incorporated on 27 December 1889. It bought the new SS Molde, renamed her SS Uttrøndelag and put her into service on the route to Børsen. She also ran on a route to Bjugn and Åfjorden, and from 1891 also Råkvåg.

Uttrøndelagens Dampbaadsamlag was incorporated on 14 February 1891. It had many of the same owners as Børsens Dampskibsselskab, and was founded with the intention of buying a larger and faster vessel for the same routes. The company's first chair was Paul Fjermstad. The new company also hoped that they would gain additional revenue through providing transport services for the Postal Service.

The shipping company ordered its vessel SS Rein from Trondheim Mekaniske Værksted for 65 thousand kroner. She was delivered in April 1892. She measured 130 gross register tonnes was 31 meters (102 ft) long and initially had a power output of 173 kW (235 hp).

Uttrøndelag was kept in service until 1896, after which she was sold and Børsens Dampskibsselskab was closed down.

As was common at the time, the shipping line put up a scheduled service with a large number of stops, for both passengers and cargo. A particularity was also the criss-crossing of the fjord between stops. The main route was run twice a week, starting in Trondheim. On the Fosen Peninsula, the ship called at Røberg (in Stadsbygd), Rissa, Hasselvika, Fevåg, Høybakken, Brekstad and Beian. It then ran to Hitra, where it stopped at Nordbotn, Knarlagsund, Heggåsen, Frihetsholmen, Hopsjøen, Stein and Kvenvær. It continued onwards to Frøya Municipality where it made stops at Skarpneset, Hamarvik, Sistranda, Svellingen, Dyrøy, Leirvika and Bogøy. It also had seasonal stops at Bustvika.

The area was already served by Hevne Dampskibsselskab and SS Einar Tambarskjælver. The two companies entered talks about coordinating their services in 1894, but nothing came of the talks. Merger talks began in 1902. A joint committee was created, and the annual meetings in both companies made positive votes on a merger proposals. Work on the merger continued, as due diligence was needed. After this, the merger was approved at a joint annual meeting on 14 December 1903, and the companies formed Fosen Aktie-Dampskibsselskab, later renamed Fosen Dampskipselskap.

== Bibliography ==
- Engvig, Olaf T. (1977). Gamle Dampen: rutebåter på Trondheimsfjorden 1850-1975 (in Norwegian). Trondheim: Adresseavisens Forlag. ISBN 8271640054.
- Hansen, Finn R. (2001). Selskapet og dets fartøyer: Fosen Trafikklag ASA (in Norwegian).
- Søraa, Gerd (2011). Fra Fosenske Damp til Torghatten ASA: 125 år over sjø og land (in Norwegian). FosenNamsosSjø and Torghatten. ISBN 978-82-990965-1-5.
