= Hevne Dampskibsselskab =

Former transport company in Norway

- Company type: Private
- Industry: Shipping
- Founded: 21 April 1886; 140 years ago
- Defunct: 14 December 1903
- Fate: Merged
- Successor: Fosen Aktie-Dampskibsselskab
- Headquarters: Trondheim, Norway
- Area served: Trondheimsfjord

Hevne Dampskibsselskab (abbreviated Hevne DS) was a shipping company based in Trondheim, Norway. It operated scheduled steamship services on the Trondheimsfjord and onwards through Trondheimsleia to Hemne Municipality (at the time spelled Hevne), with the main destination being Kyrksæterøra.

The company was founded as Fosenske Dampskibsselskab on 21 April 1886. Operations began with SS Helene. The new build SS Einar Tambarskjælver was delivered in 1890, and remained the shipping line's sole ship from 1891, when Helene was sold. Hevne DS merged with its main competitor Uttrøndelagens Dampbaadsamlag on 14 December 1903 to form Fosen Aktie-Dampskibsselskab.

== History ==
Hemne and Kyrksæterøra had seen a certain amount of steamship traffic, notably by Christiansund Dampskibsselskab from 1877 to 1879, and later Steinkjær Dampskibsselskab. The latter proved unreliable with irregular services as far in as Kyrksæterøra.

The intitaltive for the company was taken by the sheriff in Hemne, Anton Markus Hassel. He saw the possibilities following the 1882 opening of the Meråker Line, which opened up for fast railway transport of fish to new markets. To take advantage of this, the coastal areas in Uttrøndelag needed a faster connection to Trondheim. Hassel secured the purchase of a ship, SS Helene, built at, which was bought from Dampbaadesamlaget i Bergen.

The company was incorporated on 21 April 1886 by investors from Trondheim, Ørland and Hemne. Hassel was elected its inaugural chairman. The company was originally named Fosenske Dampskibsselskab.

The operations were popular, and it quickly became evident that a larger ship was needed. A major issue of new shares took place around 1890, at which time the company changed its name to Hevne Dampskibsselskab. The new capital was used for the new build SS Einar Tambarskjælver. She was delivered to Trondheim on 12 January 1890 and put into the route to Hemne the following week. She had two weekly routes, one which ran from Trondheim via Knarrlagsund on Hitra to Kyrksæterøra. The other went to Stjørna.

After Tambarskjælver was delivered, Helene was sold to Salvesen & Thams in 1891. Hevne DS was profitable, and had paid off the purchase of Tambarskjælver by 1894. Uniforms for the crew were introduced in 1893.

While Hevne DS retained a monopoly on services to Hemne, Uttrøndelag Dampbaatsamlag started a competing service to Hitra. The two companies entered talks about coordinating their services in 1894, but nothing came of the talks.

The board discussed in 1899 selling Tambarskjælver. The ship was becoming too small and too slow, but nothing came of these plans. Also discussed was keeping Tambarskjælver, and getting a second ship for the second route. Instead, the ship was upgraded with a new boiler and steam engine in 1901, after the original one had been worn out.

Merger talks with Uttrøndelagens Dampbaatsamlag began in 1902. A joint committee was created, and the annual meetings in both companies made positive votes on a merger proposals. Work on the merger continued, as due diligence was needed. After this, the merger was approved at a joint annual meeting on 14 December 1903, and the companies formed Fosen Aktie-Dampskibsselskab, later renamed Fosen Dampskipselskap.

== Fleet ==
- SS Helene measured 72 gross register tonnes, was 30.3 meters (99 ft) long and initially had a power output of 95 kW (130 hp), giving her a speed of 8 knots (15 km/h; 9.2 mph). She was built at Akers mekaniske Verksted in 1867.
- SS Einar Tambarskjælver measured 146 gross register tonnes, was 34.4 meters (113 ft) long and initially had a power output of 140 kW (190 hp), giving her a speed of 10.5 knots (19.4 km/h; 12.1 mph). She was built at Moss Jernstøberi og Mek. Værksted in 1867.

== Bibliography ==
- Engvig, Olaf T. (1977). Gamle Dampen: rutebåter på Trondheimsfjorden 1850-1975 (in Norwegian). Trondheim: Adresseavisens Forlag. ISBN 8271640054.
- Søraa, Gerd (2011). Fra Fosenske Damp til Torghatten ASA: 125 år over sjø og land (in Norwegian). FosenNamsosSjø and Torghatten. ISBN 978-82-990965-1-5.
