= Stjørna IL =

Norwegian sports club

- Full name: Stjørna Idrettslag
- Founded: 3 December 1932
- Ground: Råkvåg Stadion, Råkvåg
- Chairman: Leif Walseth Skarsmo
- Head coach: Endre Stormo
- League: 6. divisjon
Home colours

Stjørna Idrettslag is a Norwegian sports club from Indre Fosen Municipality in Trøndelag county, Norway. The club is based in Råkvåg, at the inner part of the Stjørnfjorden on the Fosen peninsula. It has sections for football, track and field, basketball, Nordic skiing, biathlon, and swimming.

Råkvåg Stadion is the home ground for the football team.

== History ==
=== Founding and early history (1932–2000) ===
The sports club was founded on 3 December 1932 as the sports club for Stjørna Municipality (now part of Ørland Municipality and Indre Fosen Municipality). Initially, the main sports were skiing and track and field, especially cross-country skiing and running. The relay called Stjørnastafetten has been arranged every year since 1945. Stjørna established the annual ski marathon called Stjørnfjellrennet in 1949 in cooperation with IL Fjellørnen. The ski marathon has since had participants like the Grønningen brothers.

On 5 July 1973 Råkvåg IL was incorporated into Stjørna IL. At the end of the 1970s, the home ground named Råkvåg stadion was finished. That led to a lot of interest in football, and both junior and senior teams were created. The senior teams were dissolved after the 1991 season due to lack of players. A section for handball was created in 1973 and then again dissolved by 1993.

=== Recent history (2000–) ===
During the 2000s, Stjørna had a section for bow and arrow, and athletes from Stjørna took plural medals at national championships. On 1 October 2012 a basketball team named Stjørna Sailors was created, the first of its kind on Fosen.

After a growing interest in the community, a male senior team in football was recreated on 1 November 2019. Due to the COVID-19 pandemic, the comeback season of 2020 has been postponed. Nevertheless, 29 years without a senior team wearing the orange club kit is soon to be over.
