= Jakob Weidemann =

Norwegian artist (1923–2001)

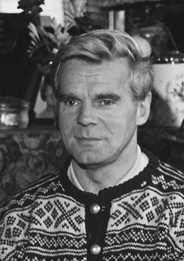
Jakob Weidemann (1966)

Jakob Weidemann (14 June 1923 – 19 December 2001) was a Norwegian artist. Jakob Weidemann is regarded as one of Norway's more important artists of post-war Modernism. Weidemann's work Storfuglen letter (1959) was selected as one of the twelve most important Norwegian artworks by Morgenbladet.

== Biography ==
Weidemann was born at Steinkjer in Nord-Trøndelag, Norway. He was the son of Osvald Weidemann (1902–1965) and Therese Margrethe Opdahl (1905–1990). He was born out of wedlock and spent the first years of childhood with his mother's parents at Steinkjer. His mother was married in 1930 to Einar Johansen (1907–1982) who was life insurance inspector and later art dealer. Weidemann moved to Oslo at age 11 to live with his mother and step-father. In 1939, the family moved to Bergen. He was educated under Eivind Lundboe at the Bergen Art School (Bergen Kunsthåndverkskole) (1939), trained with artist Ole B. Eyde in Bergen (1940–41) and studied at the Norwegian National Academy of Fine Arts in Oslo under Axel Revold and Søren Onsager (1941–42). He was awarded a Government travel allowance in 1952 and received the Conrad Mohr's legacy in 1955. He conducted study trips to Copenhagen in 1946; Paris in 1949; Italy in 1955; and the Netherlands in 1958.

His first solo exhibition was at Paus Knudsens Kunsthandel in 1942. Weidemann joined the Norwegian resistance movement during the Occupation of Norway by Nazi Germany, was arrested but escaped to Sweden in 1944. While there he was the victim of an accident in which an explosive charge blew up in such a way that he was blinded. He regained his sight, but then only in the left eye. The experience of being blind may have been decisive for the direction his art was later to take – towards an explosion of color and light.

Jacob Weidemann pioneered abstract painting in Norway in the decades following the Second World War. His first exhibition at Blomqvist's Fine Art (Blomqvists kunsthandel) in Oslo during 1946 was his breakthrough. Weidemann is considered to have become one of the more influential artists within Norwegian modernism in the 1950s. After some experimentation with different styles in the 1940s and 1950, Weidemann finally settled in what can be called expressive, lyrically abstract art. Abstract expressionism with nature as inspiration and basis became characteristic of work by Weidemann.

== Awards ==
- Anders Jahre cultural prize (Anders Jahres kulturpris) - 1994

== Notable exhibitions ==
In addition to regular exhibitions in galleries such as Galerie Ariel (1963–1988) in France, Jakob Weidemann's work was shown in a number of notable exhibition festivals and galleries. During his lifetime, Weidemann's works were twice shown at Bergen International Festival and was featured at the Venice Biennale in 1967. Kunstnernes Hus in Oslo displayed his 'forest floor' series (skogbunnbilder) in 1961.

== Present collections ==
The National Museum of Art (Nasjonalmusset) in Oslo owns over thirty of his paintings including Brytningstid (1968), Epleblomst (1973), Blomster i sne (1973) and Inntrykk fra naturen(1982). Additionally the museum has on display a number of his etchings dating from the 1940s and 1950s.

The National Museum of Art, Architecture and Design (Museet for Samtidskunst) in Oslo owns a collection of his works; among them the two early works Interior and Self-portrait from 1942, and an important work dated to the early 1950s – The United Nations, inspired by the artist Arne Ekeland.

Henie Onstad Art Center (Henie Onstad Kunstsenter) at Høvikodden in Bærum, Norway owns several important works by Weidemann, among others The Capercaillie flyr av and the monumental works of the 1960s, Veien til Jerusalem, The Crown of Thorns, Tåke" i Gethsemane and Hommage à El Greco. A typical work dated to his later years – Blue Rage – is also at Høvikodden.

The Stenersen Museum (Stenersenmuseet) in Oslo owns several early and important works by Weidemann, such as Studio Interior, Insane, Flag-raising/Liberation, Partisan, The Seaman's Widow, The Steelworker, Petrushka, and Steinskulpturen. The collection was gifted by Rolf Stenersen to the Municipality of Oslo. The Astrup Fearnley Museum in Oslo also owns one important Weidemann; The Apple-tree and the Rainbow from 1964.

Ringebu Vicarage at Ringebu Stave Church displays a selection from the collection owned by Lillehammer Art Museum (Lillehammer kunstmuseum) every summer.

Weidemann was also commissioned for a number of permanent installations, such as the stained glass in Steinkjer Church (1965), Mai inside the concert hall at Maihaugen in Lillehammer Municipality (1967), Alf Bjerckes Fabrikker in Alnabru (1960); Norsk Hydro headquarters building in Oslo (1960–1961), Alfaset Chapel in Oslo (1971) and the M/S Royal Viking Sea (1973).

== Personal life ==
In 1954 he married journalist Anne Marie Frøisland (1921-2010). In 1968, the artist moved with his wife to Ringsveen Farm in Lillehammer Municipality. In 1999, Anne and Jakob Weidemann founded a foundation (Stiftelsen Ringsveen) to provide young artists annual scholarships. Weidemann also donated his property to the foundation which administers the farm. In keeping with Weidemann's express wish, it is now a place where young artists can live and work.

== Selected works ==
- Selvportrett - 1942 (National Museum of Art, Oslo)
- Atelierinteriør- 1945 (Stenersen Museum, Oslo)
- Komposisjon - 1945 (National Museum of Art, Oslo)
- Storfuglen letter- 1959 (Henie-Onstad Art Center, Bærum)
- Klovner - 1963 (National Museum of Art, Oslo)
- Tornekronen- 1965 (National Museum of Art, Oslo)
- Veien til Jerusalem- 1965 (Henie-Onstad Art Center, Bærum)
- Tåke i Getsemane- 1965 (Henie-Onstad Art Center, Bærum)
- Inntrykk fra naturen - 1981–82 (National Museum of Art, Oslo)

== Other sources ==
- Opdahl, John S. (2007) Liss-Jakob Weidemann fra Påssåbyn (eget forlag) ISBN 978-82-997389-1-0
- Hellandsjø, Karin (2003) Jakob Weidemann : storfuglen i norsk kunst (Oslo: Schibsted Forlag) ISBN 82-516-1982-3
- Koefoed, Holger (1998) Portrett i ord : Jakob Weidemann(Oslo: Labyrinth Press) ISBN 82-7393-073-4
- Egeland, Erik (1998) Jakob Weidemann : portrett av en norsk modernist (Oslo: J. M. Stenersens Forlag) ISBN 82-7201-157-3
