= Husbysjøen =

Village in Indre Fosen Municipality, Norway

Husbysjøen Husby
- Village area
- Interactive map of Husbysjøen; Husby
- Location within Trøndelag Location within Norway
- Coordinates: 63.74731°N 10.10706°E
- Country: Norway
- Region: Central Norway
- County: Trøndelag
- District: Fosen
- Municipality: Indre Fosen
- Elevation: 4 m (13 ft)
- Time zone: UTC+01:00 (CET)
  - Summer (DST): UTC+02:00 (CEST)
- Post Code: 7113 Husbysjøen

Husbysjøen or Husby is a village in Indre Fosen Municipality in Trøndelag county, Norway. The village is located along the south side of the Sørfjorden, an arm of the Stjørnfjorden. It is located about 1 kilometre (0.62 mi) west of the village of Sørfjorden, about 5 kilometres (3.1 mi) southeast of the village of Råkvåg, about 20 kilometres (12 mi) northeast of the village of Hasselvika, and about 12 kilometres (7.5 mi) north of the lake Storvatnet. Ramsvik Church is located across the fjord on the north shore.

Husbysjøen was the administrative centre of the old Stjørna Municipality prior to the dissolution of the municipality in 1964 (when it was divided between Rissa Municipality and Bjugn Municipality).
