= Agdenes Lighthouse =

Coastal lighthouse in Norway

Agdenes Lighthouse Ringflua
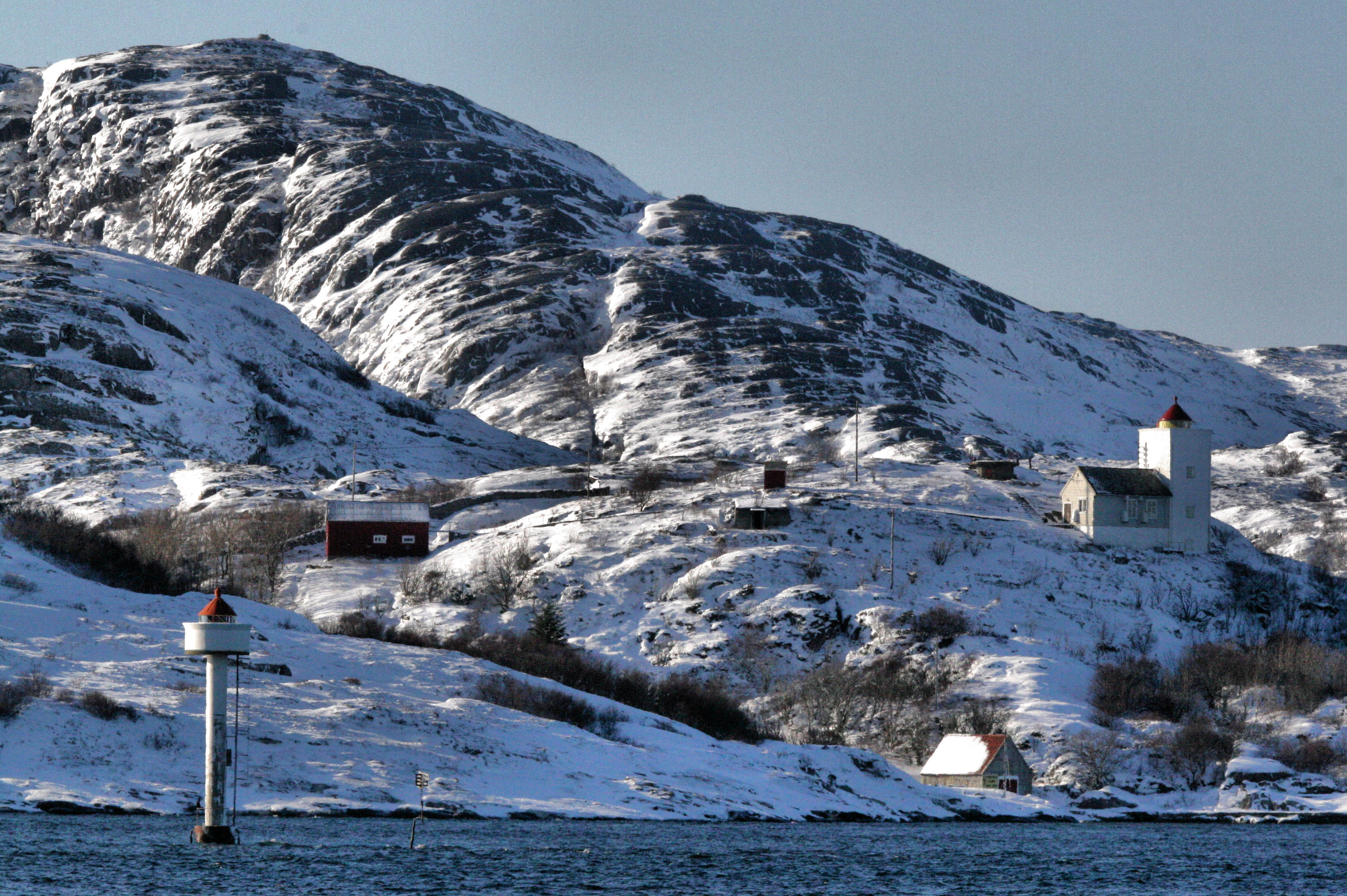
- View of the lighthouse; old one in the background, new one in the foreground
- Location: Trøndelag, Norway
- Coordinates: 63°38′50″N 9°45′22″E

Tower
- Constructed: 1804 (first); 1828 (second)
- Construction: masonry tower (second) concrete tower (current)
- Automated: 1984
- Height: 17.8 metres (58 ft) (second); 11 metres (36 ft) (current)
- Shape: square tower with balcony and lantern (second) cylindrical tower with balcony and lantern
- Markings: white tower, red lantern roof (second and current)

Light
- First lit: 1984 (current "Ringflua")
- Deactivated: 1984 (second)
- Focal height: 11.2 metres (37 ft)
- Lens: fifth order Fresnel lens
- Range: Red: 9.82 nmi (18.19 km; 11.30 mi) Green: 9.36 nmi (17.33 km; 10.77 mi) White: 12.39 nmi (22.95 km; 14.26 mi)
- Characteristic: Oc (2) WRG 8s
- Norway no.: 414000

The Agdenes Lighthouse or Ringflua is a lighthouse on the Trondheimsfjord in Orkland, Trøndelag, Norway. The lighthouse sits just offshore at a 90 degree bend in the fjord leading to Trondheim and is only accessible via boat. The lighthouse stands on the shore nearby. The lighthouse is only accessible by boat. It is located about 6 kilometres (3.7 mi) east of Vassbygda, about 6 kilometres (3.7 mi) south of Brekstad in Ørland Municipality, and about 4 kilometres (2.5 mi) northwest of Hasselvika in Indre Fosen Municipality.

== History ==
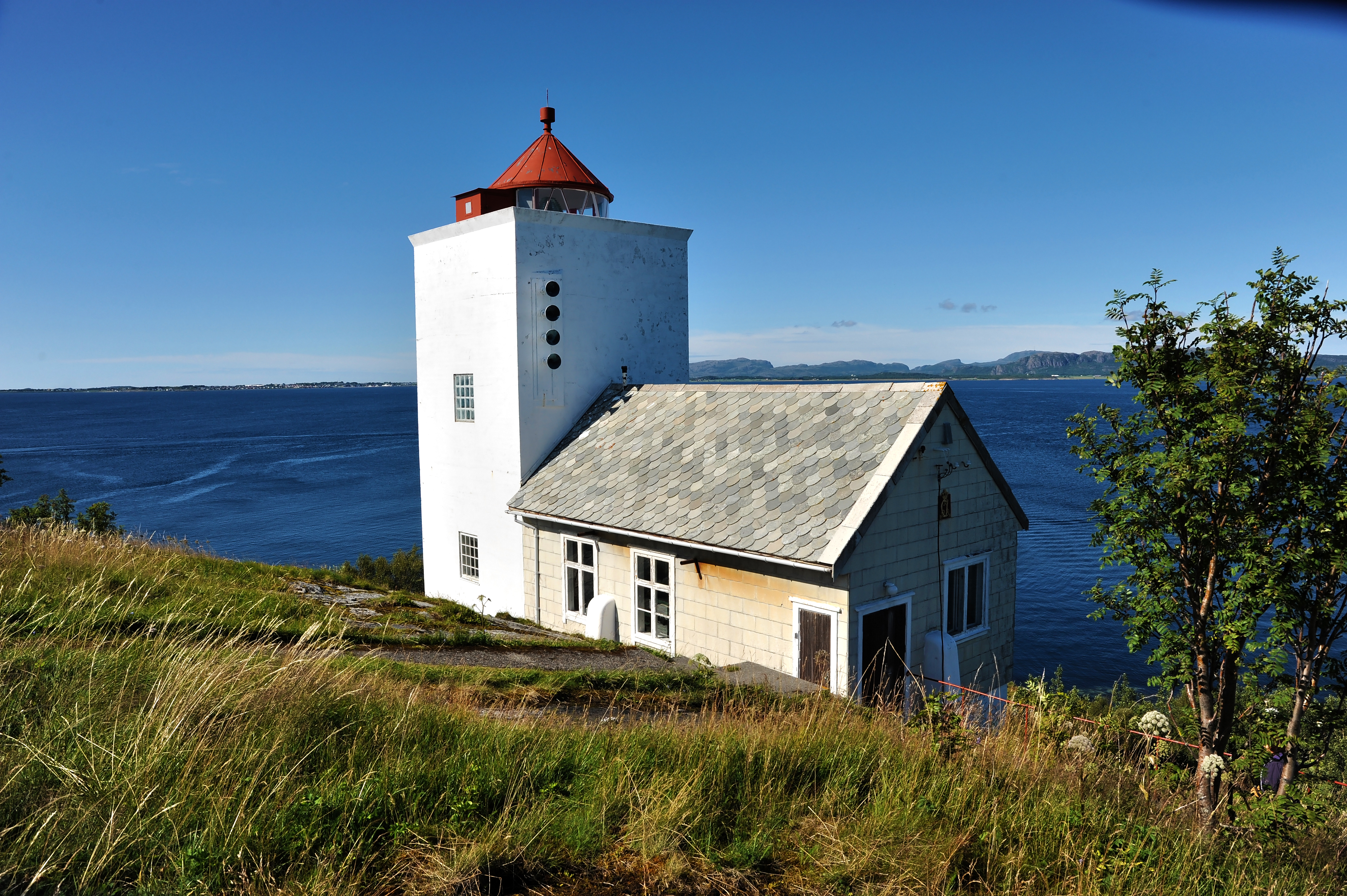
Agdenes Lighthouse

The original lighthouse building was built in 1804 near the shore of the Trondheimsfjord. That building was rebuilt in 1828. In 1984, the old building was closed and a new light was built on Ringflua, a tiny rock in the fjord, just off the shoreline. The reason that the new light was built just offshore was to make it more visible since the old light was blocked from certain directions.

The new lighthouse is 11.2 metres (37 ft) tall and can be seen for up to 12.39 nautical miles (22.95 km; 14.26 mi). It has an occulting light that blinks white, red, and green over an eight-second period.

== See also ==
- List of lighthouses in Norway
- Lighthouses in Norway
