= Ulvøya (Hitra) =

Island in Trøndelag, Norway

- Interactive map of Ulvøya

Geography
- Location: Trøndelag, Norway
- Coordinates: 63.6735°N 09.0700°E
- Area: 6.4 km^{2} (2.5 sq mi)
- Length: 3.8 km (2.36 mi)
- Width: 2 km (1.2 mi)
- Highest elevation: 74 m (243 ft)
- Highest point: Ørnfjellet

Administration
- Norway
- County: Trøndelag
- Municipality: Hitra Municipality

Ulvøya is an island in Hitra Municipality in Trøndelag county, Norway. The 6.4-square-kilometre (1,600-acre) island is located just north of Fjellværsøya island. The Knarrlagsundet bridge connects the two islands. The island is home to the villages of Knarrlagsund and Ulvan. Marine Harvest has a fish processing plant in Ulvan. The large island of Hitra lies about 3 kilometres (1.9 mi) to the southwest.

== See also ==
- List of islands of Norway
