= Mokkavatnet =

Lake in Steinkjer, Norway

- Interactive map of the lake
- Location: Steinkjer Municipality, Trøndelag
- Coordinates: 63.9409°N 12.0386°E
- Basin countries: Norway
- Max. length: 3.5 kilometres (2.2 mi)
- Max. width: 3 kilometres (1.9 mi)
- Surface area: 17.17 km^{2} (6.63 sq mi)
- Shore length^{1}: 5.25 kilometres (3.26 mi)
- Surface elevation: 331 metres (1,086 ft)
- References: NVE
- ^{1} Shore length is not a well-defined measure.

Mokkavatnet is a lake in Steinkjer Municipality in Trøndelag county, Norway. The 17.17-square-kilometre (6.63 sq mi) lake is located about 30 kilometres (19 mi) southeast of the town of Steinkjer in what used to be Ogndal Municipality prior to 1964. The lake is one of the headwaters of the river Ogna.

== See also ==
- List of lakes of Norway
