= Steinkjer Church =

Church in Trøndelag, Norway

- Steinkjer kirke
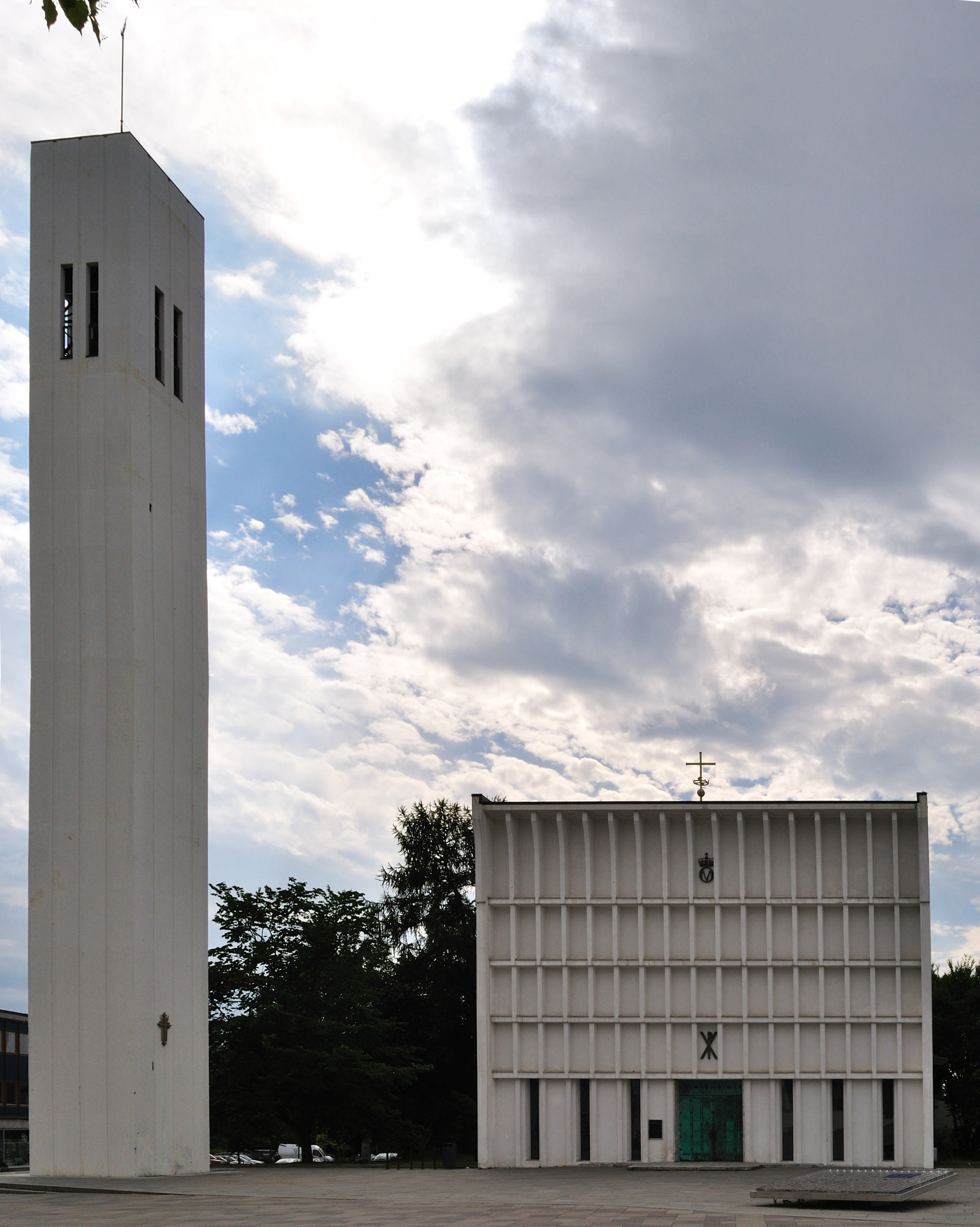
- View of the church
- Steinkjer Church
- 64.01492020°N 11.49409443°E
- Location: Steinkjer Municipality, Trøndelag
- Country: Norway
- Denomination: Church of Norway
- Churchmanship: Evangelical Lutheran

History
- Status: Parish church
- Founded: 1865
- Consecrated: 25 March 1965

Architecture
- Functional status: Active
- Architect: Olav S. Platou
- Architectural type: Basilica
- Completed: 1965 (61 years ago)

Specifications
- Capacity: 550
- Materials: Concrete

Administration
- Diocese: Nidaros bispedømme
- Deanery: Stiklestad prosti
- Parish: Steinkjer
- Norwegian Cultural Heritage Site
- Type: Church
- Status: Not protected
- ID: 85565

Steinkjer Church (Norwegian: Steinkjer kirke) is a parish church of the Church of Norway in Steinkjer Municipality in Trøndelag county, Norway. It is located in the town of Steinkjer. It is the church for the Steinkjer parish which is part of the Stiklestad prosti (deanery) in the Diocese of Nidaros. The white, concrete church was built in a modern, basilica style in 1965 using plans drawn up by the architect Olav S. Platou. The church seats about 550 people.

== History ==
The village of Steinkjer was granted town status in 1857. Plans for a church for the town began soon afterwards. Georg Bull designed the first church which was built in 1865. It was a brick long church that was consecrated on 2 August 1865. In 1866, an organ was installed. The church initially just had a cross in the front. In 1877 it received an altarpiece. On 15 August 1900, the church burned down in a city-wide fire.

After the fire, the town was rebuilt. A new church was designed by Karl Norum. It was consecrated on 21 December 1902. This was a brick, cruciform church where some old wall surfaces that survived the fire were reused. That church had 570 seats. In the 1930s, the church received stained glass windows as well as pictures of the twelve apostles on the chancel arch, made by Gabriel Kielland. The church was destroyed on 21 April 1940 during the fighting that took place in Steinkjer during World War II.

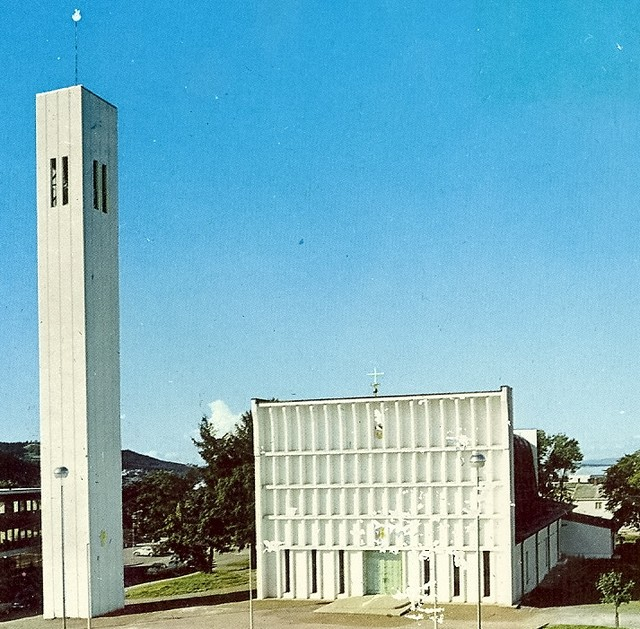
Front view of the church

Several years passed after the war was over before the church could be rebuilt. Olav Stoud Platou designed the new building which was consecrated on 25 March 1965. The entrance front is large and square and hides the roof shape and the cross section of the nave. It gives associations to the western front of the Gothic cathedrals and the dominant fronts of the Renaissance churches towards the street. The front door is made of cast bronze and crowned with the Christ monogram. According to older custom, there is also a royal monogram over the front door.

== Design ==
This non-traditional long church design incorporates wood, concrete, and glass. It was designed by Olav S. Platou in 1965. The church has a 38-metre (125 ft) tall free-standing square bell tower near the main entrance. The exterior front of the church has a large square white cement facade. The church interior has white brick walls and the floor is red brick. The ceiling inside the church is shaped like the cross-section of a church bell. The roof is supported by simple columns made of pine which are stained dark. This represents a stark contrast to the white walls and pillars. The length of the church is underlined by the low windows on the long side. Steinkjer Church is inspired by several churches in Italy: San Michele, San Frediano, and San Martino. Jakob Weidemann designed 11 different stained glass windows in the church.

== See also ==
- List of churches in Nidaros
