= Brannan =

Brannan is a surname. Notable people with the surname include:

== Real people ==
- Andy Brannan (1919–1997), Australian rules footballer
- Andrew Brannan (1948–2015), American Vietnam war veteran and criminal
- Charles F. Brannan (1903–1992), United States Secretary of Agriculture, 1948–1953
- John Brannan (1819–1892), American officer who served in the Civil War and Mexican–American War
- Justin Brannan, New York City politician and retired punk rock musician
- Mike Brannan (1955–2013), American golfer
- Samuel Brannan (1819–1889), American businessman and journalist
- Samuel S. Brannan (1835–1880), American politician and newspaper editor
- Solomon Brannan (born 1942), American football player
- Thomas Brannan (1893–1960), English rugby league footballer who played in the 1910s and 1920s

== Fictional characters ==
- Josh Brannan, character in the NBC series Last Resort
