= Ramsvik Church =

Church in Trøndelag, Norway

- Ramsvik kirke
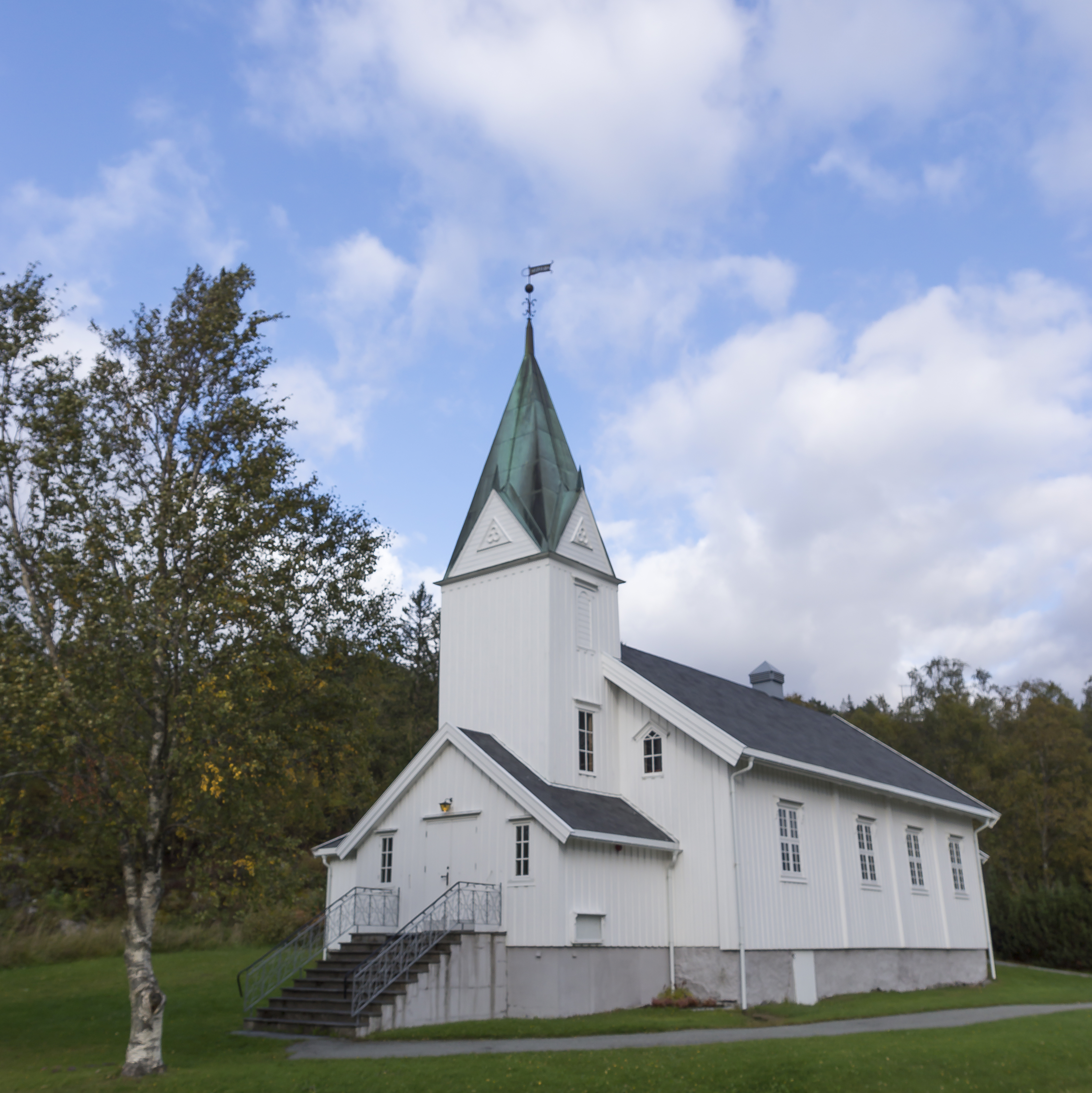
- View of the church
- Ramsvik Church
- 63.75154411°N 10.08667928°E
- Location: Indre Fosen Municipality, Trøndelag
- Country: Norway
- Denomination: Church of Norway
- Churchmanship: Evangelical Lutheran

History
- Status: Parish church
- Founded: 1908
- Consecrated: Aug 1909

Architecture
- Functional status: Active
- Architectural type: Long church
- Completed: 1908 (118 years ago)

Specifications
- Capacity: 200
- Materials: Wood

Administration
- Diocese: Nidaros bispedømme
- Deanery: Fosen prosti
- Parish: Sør-Stjørna
- Norwegian Cultural Heritage Site
- Type: Church
- Status: Not protected
- ID: 85267

Ramsvik Church (Norwegian: Ramsvik kirke) is a parish church of the Church of Norway in Indre Fosen Municipality in Trøndelag county, Norway. It is located at Ramsvik, on the south side of the village of Råkvåg, on the shore of the Stjørnfjorden. It is one of the churches for the Sør-Stjørna parish which is part of the Fosen prosti (deanery) in the Diocese of Nidaros. The white, wooden church was built in a long church style in 1908 by an unknown architect. The church seats about 200 people.

== History ==
The building was originally constructed as a chapel in 1908 and it was consecrated in August 1909. Over the years it has been expanded several times and now it has been upgraded to a full parish church. The church does not have a cemetery adjacent to it, but rather they use a cemetery in the nearby village of Husbysjøen, about 4 kilometres (2.5 mi) away.

== See also ==
- List of churches in Nidaros
