= Ofstad =

Ofstad is a surname. Notable people with the surname include:

- Augvald, Norwegian petty king
- Kari Ofstad (born 1961), Norwegian sprint canoer
- Jarle Ofstad (1927–2014), Norwegian physicist
- Einar-Fredrik Ofstad (1916–1998), Norwegian diplomat
- Per Ofstad, Norwegian chess master
