= Byafossen =

Village in Steinkjer Municipality, Norway

- Village
- Interactive map of Byafossen
- Location within Trøndelag Location within Norway
- Coordinates: 64.0359°N 11.5506°E
- Country: Norway
- Region: Central Norway
- County: Trøndelag
- District: Innherred
- Municipality: Steinkjer Municipality
- Elevation: 35 m (115 ft)
- Time zone: UTC+01:00 (CET)
  - Summer (DST): UTC+02:00 (CEST)
- Post Code: 7716 Steinkjer

Byafossen is a village in Steinkjer Municipality in Trøndelag county, Norway. It is located along the river Byaelva, about 3 kilometres (1.9 mi) northeast of the town of Steinkjer and about 6 kilometres (3.7 mi) southwest of the village of Sunnan. The Nordlandsbanen railway line passes through the village, but there is not a station here. The village is named after the local 12.5-metre (41 ft) waterfall on the river. The village is usually considered part of the town of Steinkjer urban area.

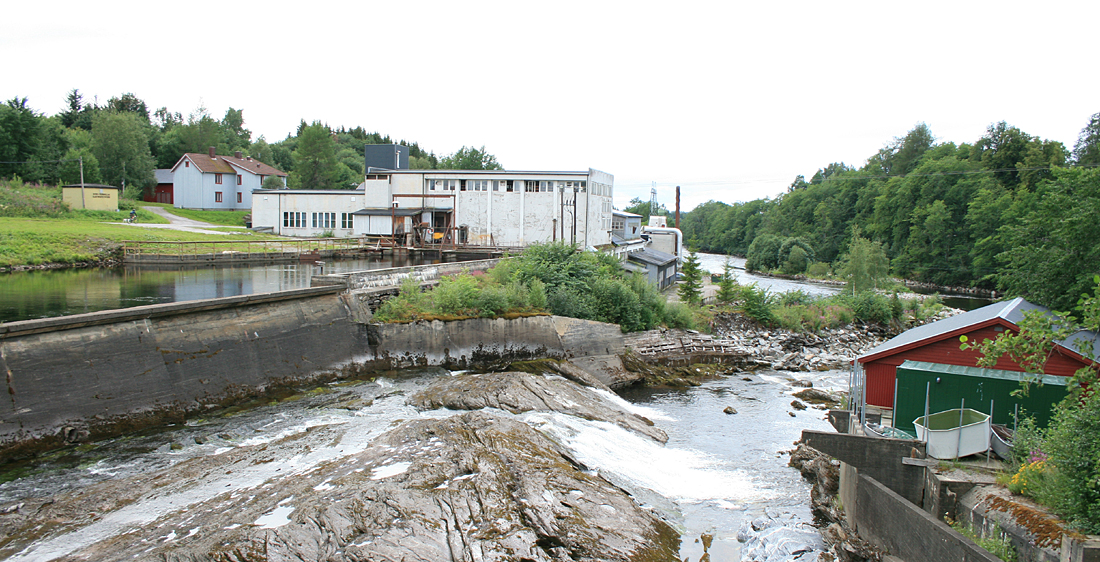
View of the local waterfall and power station
