= Ulvan =

Village in Hitra Municipality, Norway

- Village
- Interactive map of Ulvan
- Location within Trøndelag Location within Norway
- Coordinates: 63.6746°N 09.0389°E
- Country: Norway
- Region: Central Norway
- County: Trøndelag
- District: Fosen
- Municipality: Hitra Municipality
- Elevation: 9 m (30 ft)
- Time zone: UTC+01:00 (CET)
  - Summer (DST): UTC+02:00 (CEST)
- Post Code: 7242 Knarrlagsund

Ulvan is a village on the island of Ulvøya in Hitra Municipality in Trøndelag county, Norway. It is located on the western side of the island, along the Frøyfjorden, about 2.5 kilometres (1.6 mi) west of the village of Knarrlaget. Ulvan is home to a large fish processing plant operated by Marine Harvest.
