= Vassbygda, Agdenes =

Village in Orkland Municipality, Norway

Vassbygda
- Village
- Interactive map of Vassbygda
- Location within Trøndelag Location within Norway
- Coordinates: 63.6190°N 09.6389°E
- Country: Norway
- Region: Central Norway
- County: Trøndelag
- District: Fosen
- Municipality: Orkland Municipality
- Elevation: 6 m (20 ft)
- Time zone: UTC+01:00 (CET)
  - Summer (DST): UTC+02:00 (CEST)
- Post Code: 7318 Agdenes

Vassbygda is a village in Orkland Municipality in Trøndelag county, Norway. It is located near the mouth of the Trondheimsfjorden across from the town of Brekstad in Ørland Municipality. The Agdenes Lighthouse lies about 6 kilometres (3.7 mi) to the east of the village and the village of Vernes and the Agdenes Church are both located about 10 kilometres (6.2 mi) to the southwest of Vassbygda. The Brekstad–Valset Ferry lies just east of Vassbygda, connecting it to Brekstad to the north.
