= Skjelstad =

Skjelstad is a Norwegian surname. Notable people with the surname include:

- André N. Skjelstad (born 1965), Norwegian politician for the Liberal Party
- Bjørn Skjelstad (born 1954), Norwegian local politician
- Erik Mikalsen Skjelstad (1801–1857), Norwegian farmer and local politician
- Haftor Gundersen Skjelstad (1802–1851), Norwegian municipal politician and farmer
- Trine Skjelstad Jensen (born 1994), Norwegian footballer
