= Gimse =

Gimse is a surname. Notable people with the surname include:

- Guro Angell Gimse (born 1971), Norwegian politician
- Håvard Gimse (born 1966), Norwegian classical pianist
- Joseph Gimse (born 1957), American politician
