= Thomas Brannan =

English rugby league footballer

Personal information
- Full name: Thomas Brannan
- Born: October→December 1893; Dewsbury, England
- Died: July→September 1960 (aged 66); Upper Agbrigg, Wakefield, England

Playing information
- Position: Wing
Club
Years	Team	Pld	T	G	FG	P
≤1914–21	Batley	75	29	1
1921–21/22	Wakefield Trinity	34	14	0	0	42
	Total	109	43	1	0	42

Thomas "Tommy" Brannan (1893–1960), also known by the nickname of "Dowdy", was an English professional rugby league footballer who played in the 1910s and 1920s. He played at club level for Batley, and Wakefield Trinity, as a wing.

== Background ==
Tommy 'Dowdy' Brannan's birth was registered in Dewsbury, West Riding of Yorkshire, he was a knocker-upper in Batley, on Tuesday 28 July 1914 Brannan was found guilty of being drunk and riotous, and assaulting a police constable (PC) named Thompson, who said in court that Brannan had used objectionable language toward him whilst on-board a tramcar, and that this continued after they descended from the tramcar, when PC Thompson went to arrest Brannan, Brannan kicked PC Thompson several times, including twice in the head, it took five police constables to transfer Brannan to the police station, which was witnessed by a crowd of 500-people on Taylor Street, Batley, at midnight on Friday 24 July 1914. Brannan said in court that he was sober, and that PC Thompson took offence because he thought he was laughing at him, and that PC Thompson had hit him on the nose and he had retaliated; Brannan was fined 5-shillings (5/–) plus costs for being drunk and disorderly, fined 10-shillings (10/–) plus costs for assaulting PC Thompson, the total fine being 15-shillings (15/–) plus costs (based on increases in average earnings, this would be approximately £247 in 2016), and his death aged 66 was registered in Upper Agbrigg, Wakefield, West Riding of Yorkshire.

== Playing career ==
=== Notable tour matches ===
Tommy 'Dowdy' Brannan played on the wing in Wakefield Trinity's 3-29 defeat by Australia in the 1921–22 Kangaroo tour of Great Britain match at Belle Vue, Wakefield on Saturday 22 October 1921, in front of a crowd of 6,000.

=== Club career ===
Tommy 'Dowdy' Brannan was transferred from Batley to Wakefield Trinity in January 1921. Like the Batley player; Herbert 'Dodger' Simms, to keep fit he raced against greyhounds, and beat them.

=== Career records ===
Batley/Batley Bulldogs' "most tries in a match" record of 5-tries, is jointly held by; Joe Oakland (1908), Tommy 'Dowdy' Brannan (against Swinton at Mount Pleasant, Batley on Saturday 17 January 1920), Jim Wale (1926 and 1927), Tommy Oldroyd (against Highfield on 6 March 1994), Ben Feehan (against Halifax on 18 August 2008), and Jermaine McGillvary (against Whitehaven on 24 May 2009).
