= Lerkehaug =

Village in Steinkjer Municipality, Norway

- Village
- Interactive map of Lerkehaug
- Location within Trøndelag Location within Norway
- Coordinates: 63.9920°N 11.5021°E
- Country: Norway
- Region: Central Norway
- County: Trøndelag
- District: Innherred
- Municipality: Steinkjer Municipality

Area
  - Total: 0.32 km^{2} (0.12 sq mi)
- Elevation: 40 m (130 ft)

Population (2000)
  - Total: 372
  - Density: 1,162.5/km^{2} (3,011/sq mi)
- Time zone: UTC+01:00 (CET)
  - Summer (DST): UTC+02:00 (CEST)
- Post Code: 7711 Steinkjer

Lerkehaug is a village area in Steinkjer Municipality in Trøndelag county, Norway. It is located about 3 kilometres (1.9 mi) south of the center of the town of Steinkjer.

The 0.32-square-kilometre (79-acre) village had a population (2000) of 372 and a population density of 1,162.5 inhabitants per square kilometre (3,011/sq mi). Since 2000, it has been considered a part of the town of Steinkjer and the population and area data for this village area has not been separately tracked by Statistics Norway.
