= Agdenes Church =

Church in Trøndelag, Norway

- Agdenes kirke
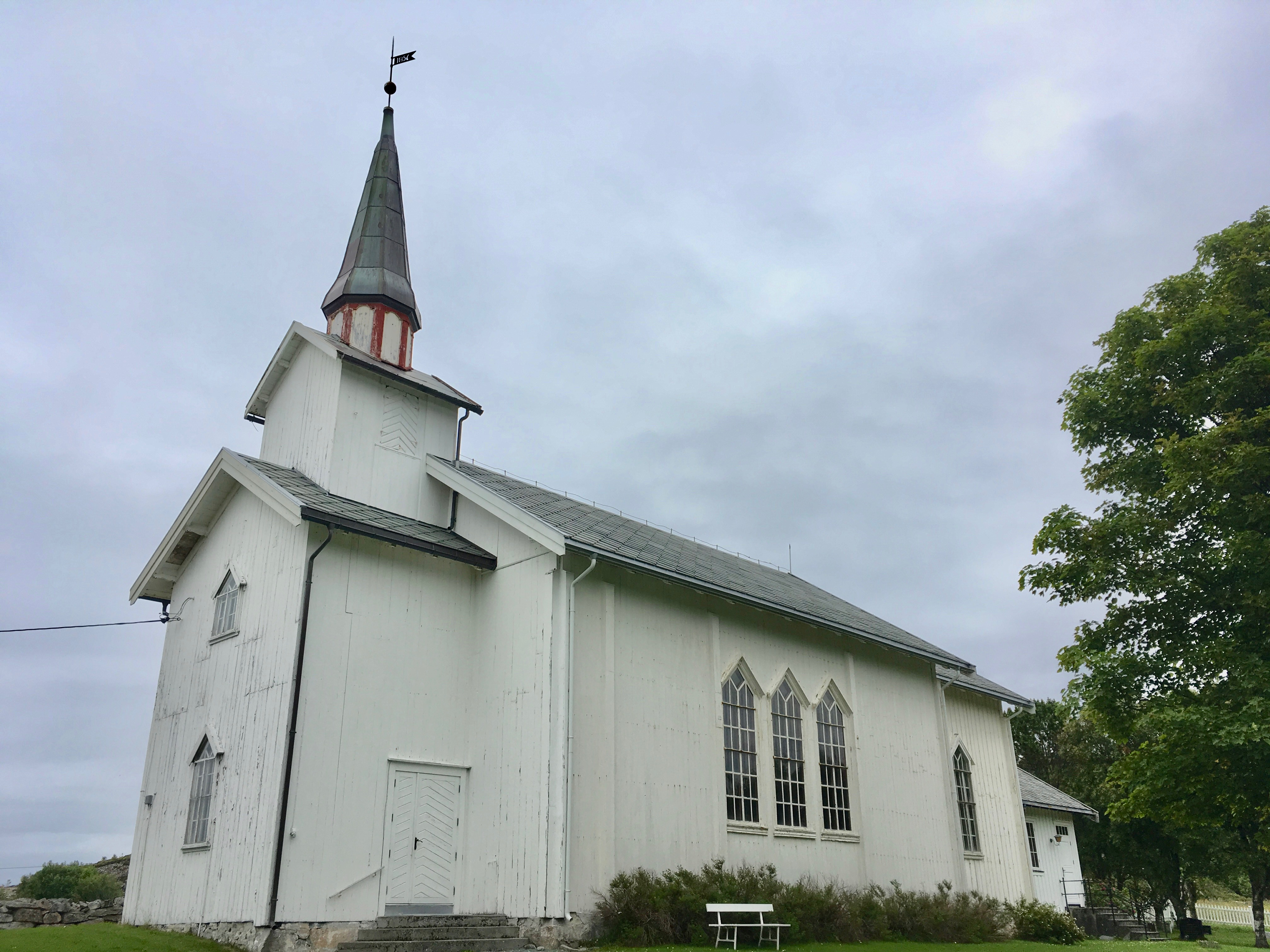
- View of the church
- Agdenes Church
- 63°34′58″N 9°30′58″E
- Location: Orkland Municipality, Trøndelag
- Country: Norway
- Denomination: Church of Norway
- Churchmanship: Evangelical Lutheran

History
- Status: Parish church
- Founded: 12th century
- Consecrated: 27 Mar 1858

Architecture
- Functional status: Active
- Architect: Christian Heinrich Grosch
- Architectural type: Long church
- Completed: 1857 (169 years ago)
- Closed: c. 1400s-1857

Specifications
- Capacity: 200
- Materials: Wood

Administration
- Diocese: Nidaros bispedømme
- Deanery: Orkdal prosti
- Parish: Agdenes
- Norwegian Cultural Heritage Site
- Type: Church
- Status: Listed
- ID: 83757

Agdenes Church (Norwegian: Agdenes kirke) is a parish church of the Church of Norway in Orkland Municipality in Trøndelag county, Norway. It is located in the village of Vernes along the Trondheimsleia in the north part of the municipality, about 10 kilometres (6.2 mi) southwest of Vassbygda. It is the main church for the Agdenes parish which is part of the Orkdal prosti (deanery) in the Diocese of Nidaros. The white, wooden church was built in a long church style in 1857 using plans drawn up by the architect Christian Heinrich Grosch. The church seats about 200 people.

== History ==
According to the Soga om Magnussønene (the saga of the sons of Magnus) in the Heimskringla, the first Agdenes Church was built by King Øystein during the early 12th century (probably before the year 1123). The first church was located at Agdenes, on a peninsula near the confluence of the Trondheimsfjorden and the Stjørnfjorden, about 13 kilometres (8.1 mi) northeast of the present site of the church. The King who built the church also constructed a fortress wall surrounding the area and a harbor along the fjord. During the 13th century, King Håkon Håkonsson had repairs carried out on the church. It is not known when this church was closed, but during the mid-19th century, archaeological remains of the church site were found. The church was likely closed before the reformation in Norway during the 16th century because there were no historical records of it at that time when all churches were surveyed across the country.

For many centuries after the old church was closed, the Agdenes area was part of the Ørland Church parish. By the mid-19th century, the people of Agdenes were requesting their own church so that they would not have to cross the Trondheimsfjorden to get to their church. The church was built in 1857 by Christian Heinrich Grosch. The church was supposed to be consecrated on 24 March 1858, but due to a storm and snowy weather, it had to be postponed for three days until 27 March although several of the priests that were supposed to be there were still unable to make it. In 1869, a tower on the west end of the building was constructed and the original small tower that sat on the centre of the roof of the nave was removed. In 1982, the church was expanded to add more seating.

== Media gallery ==
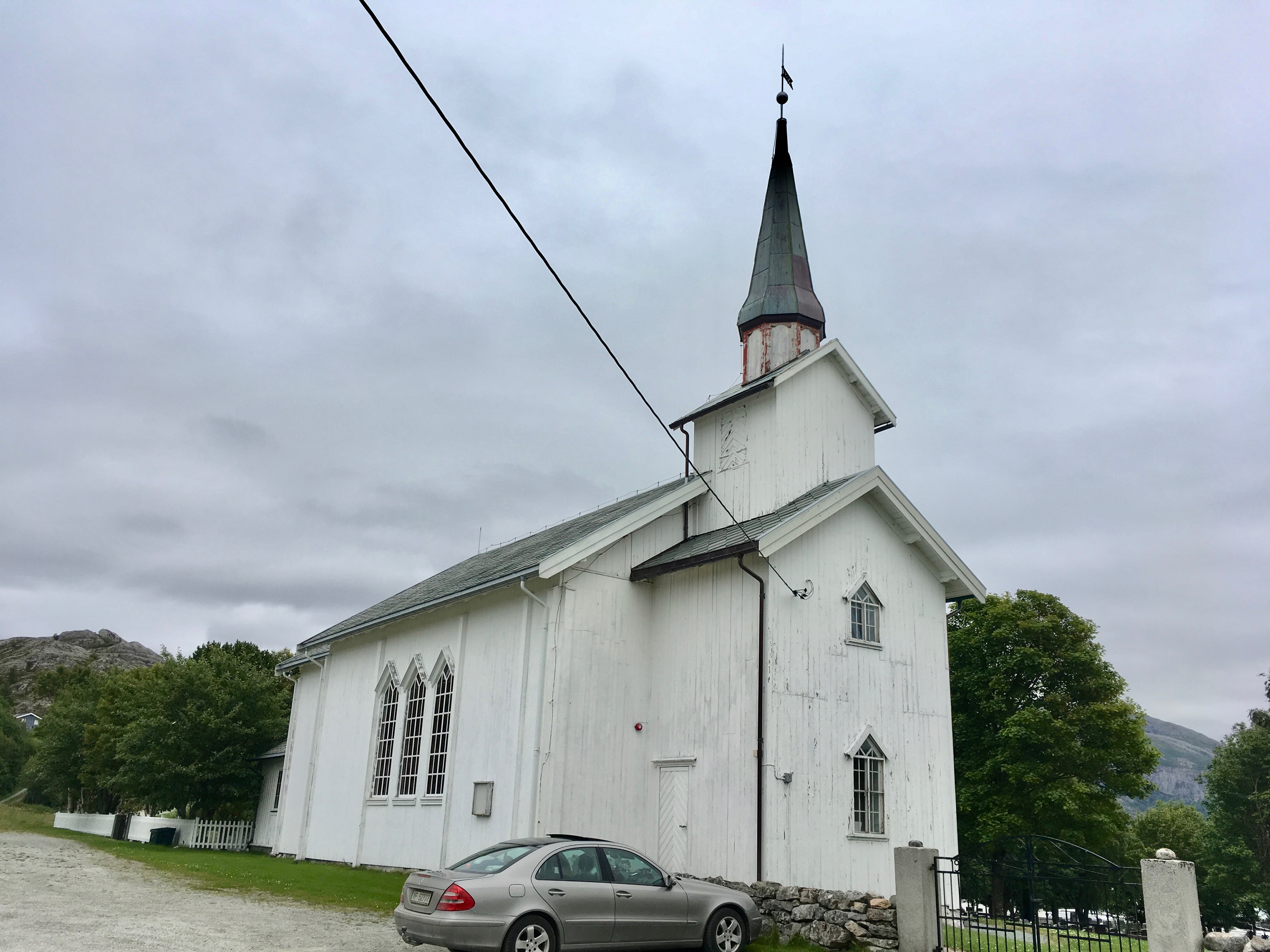

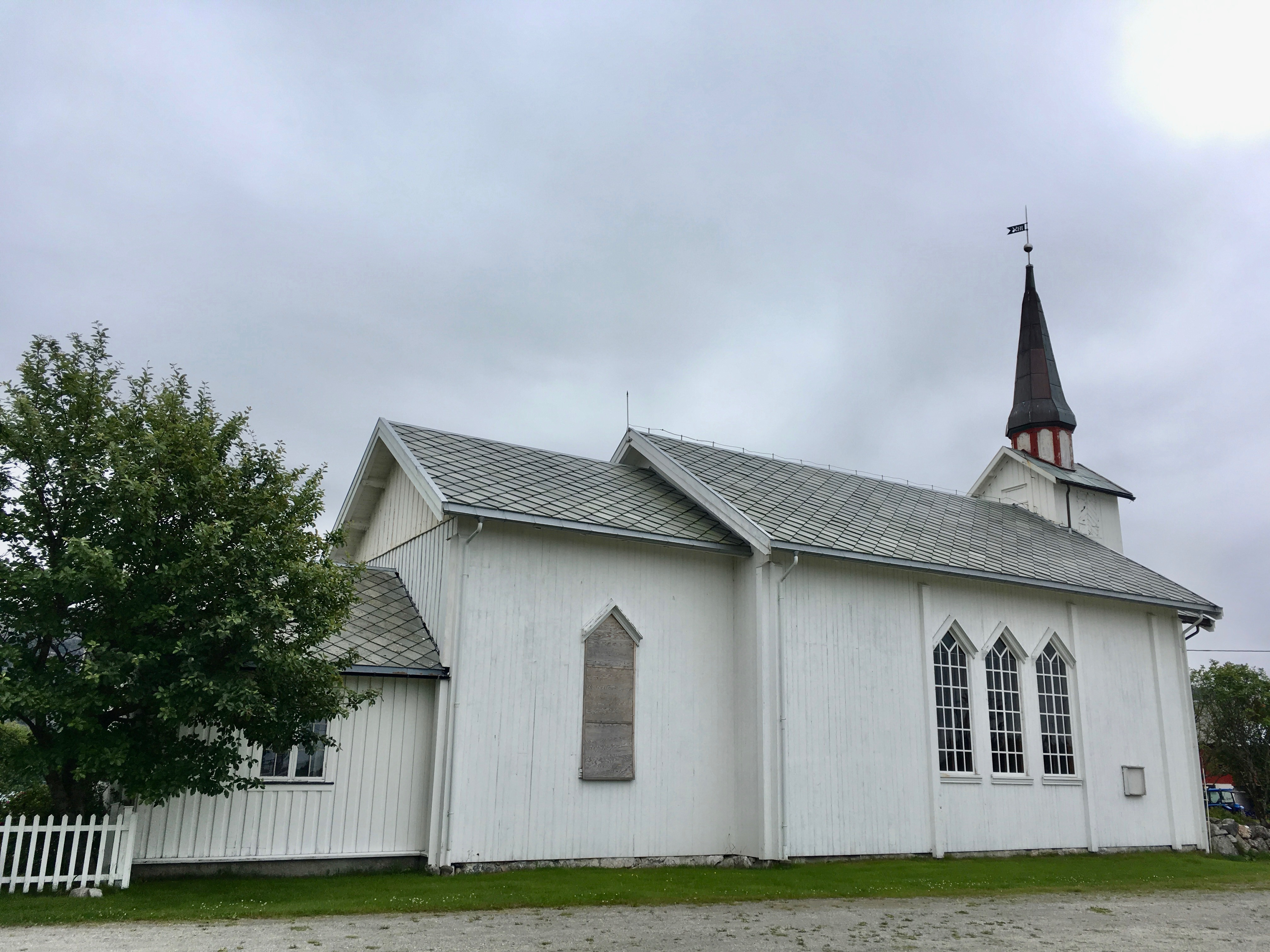

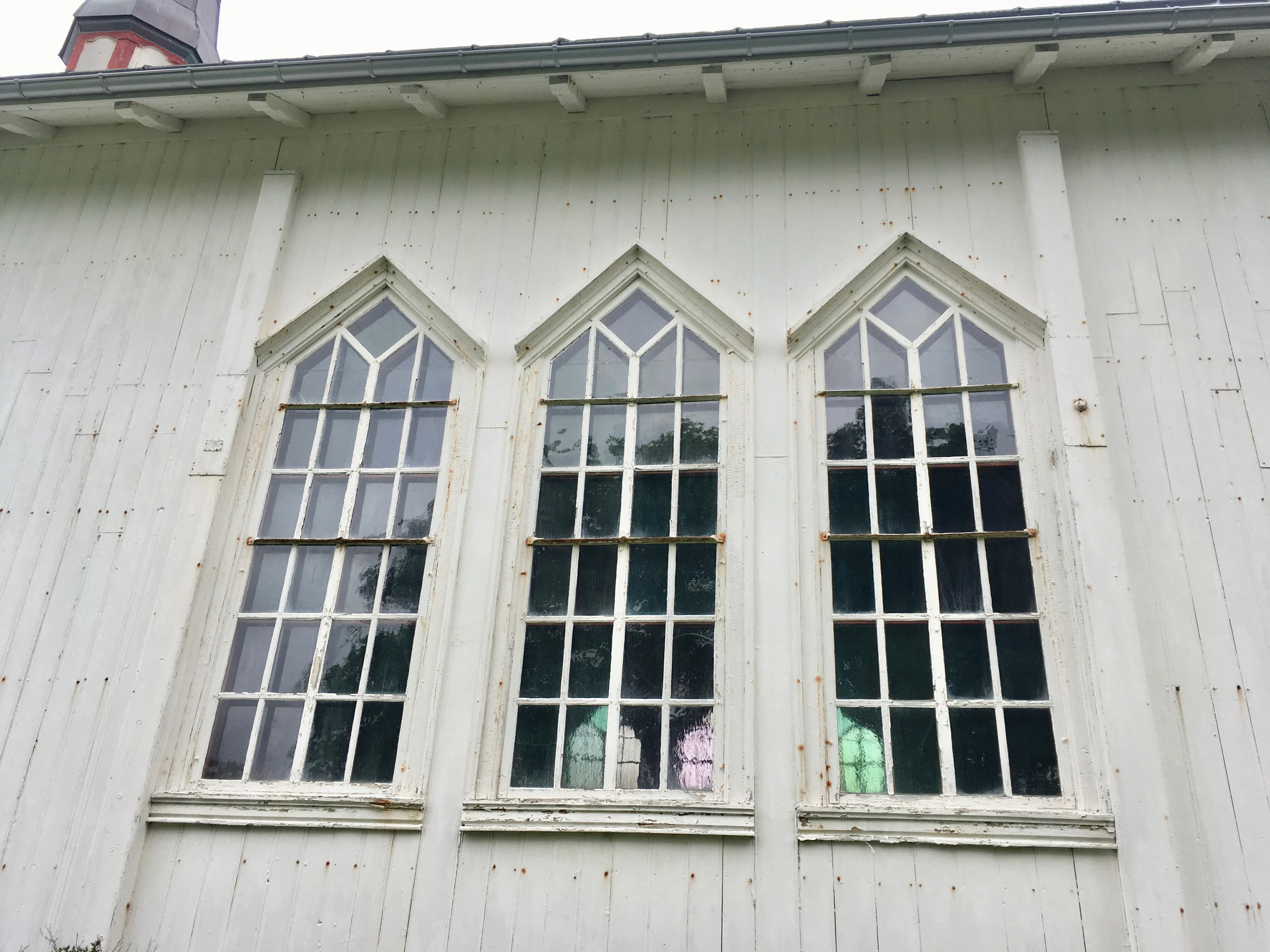

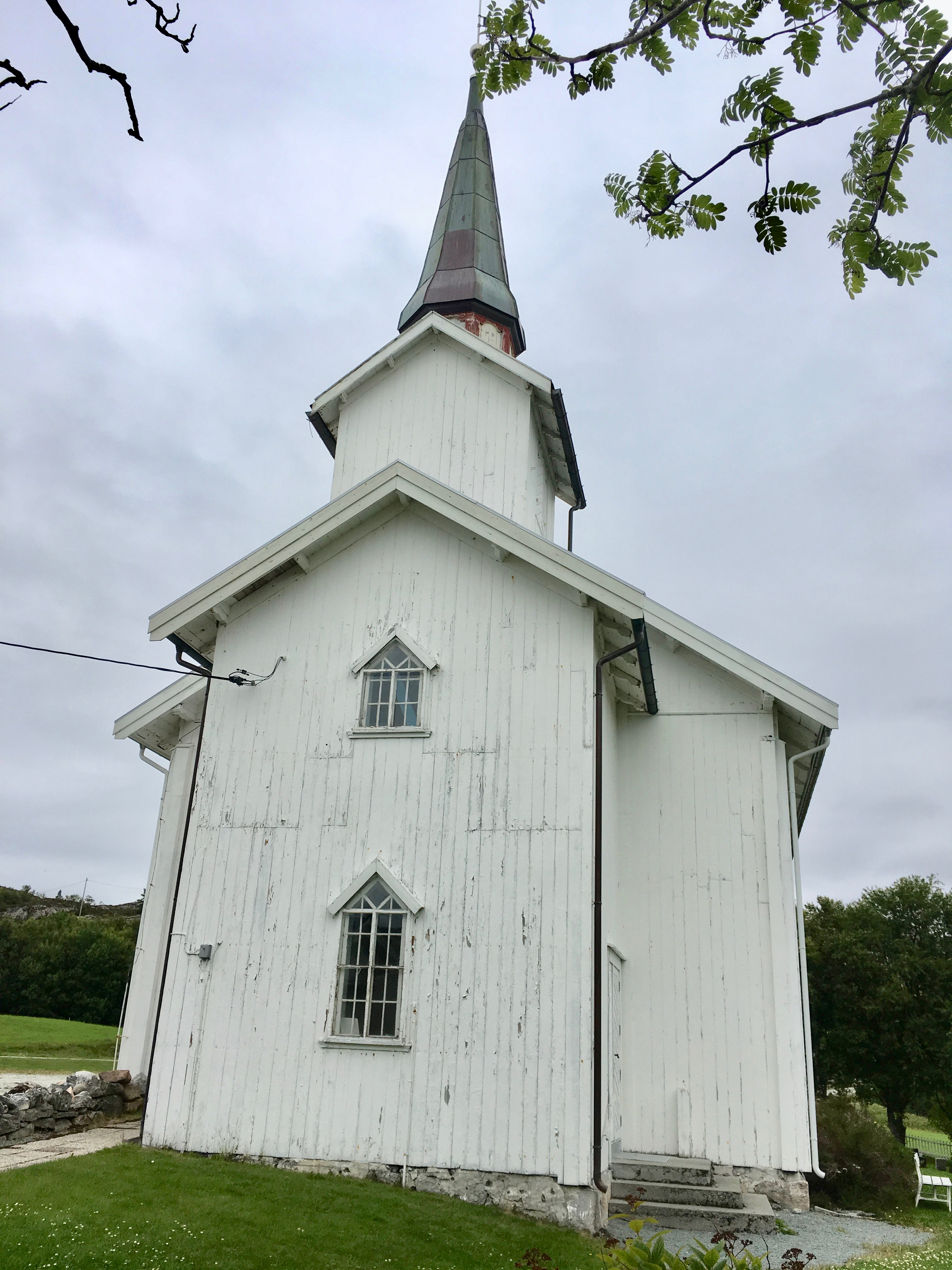

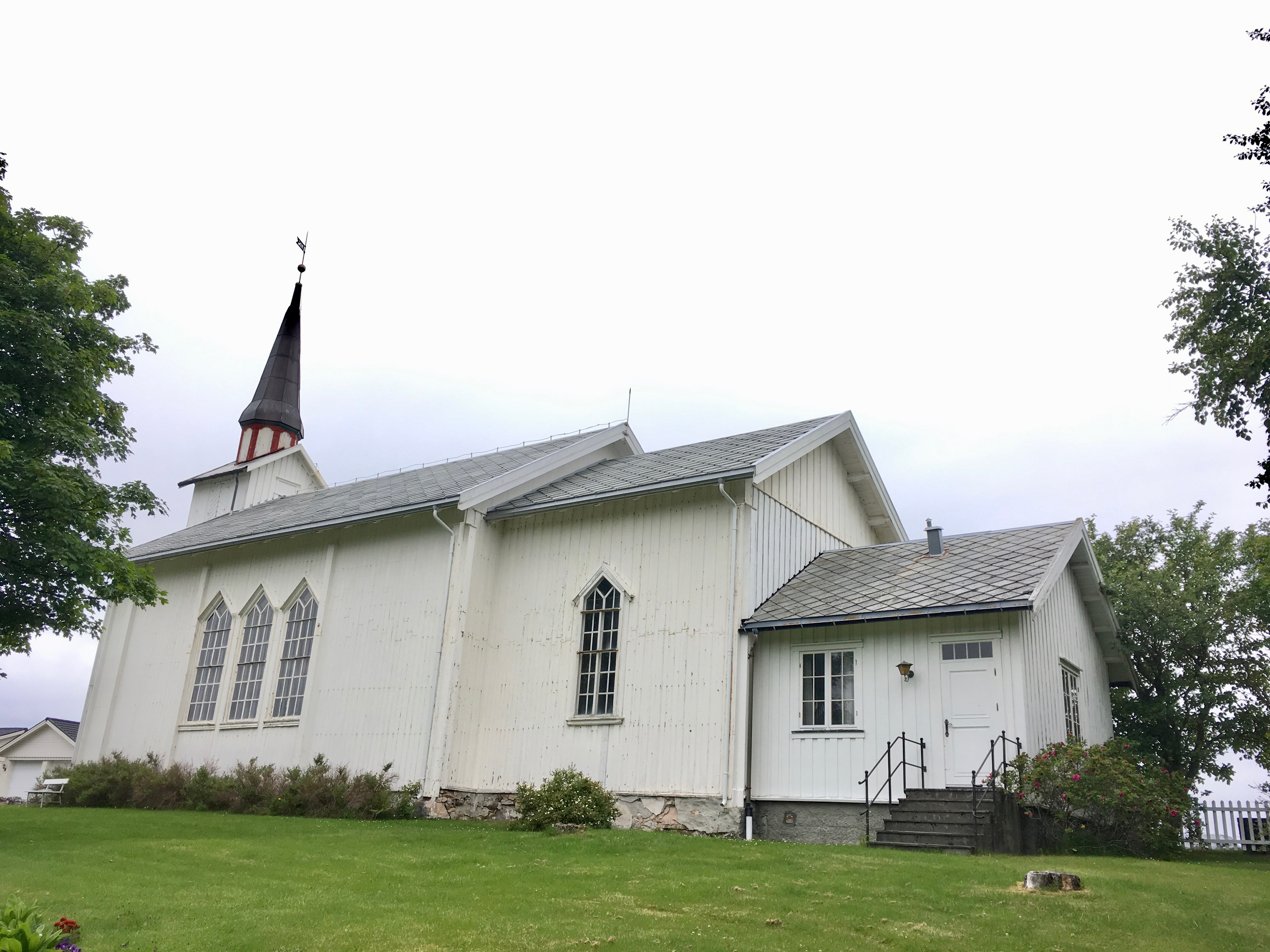

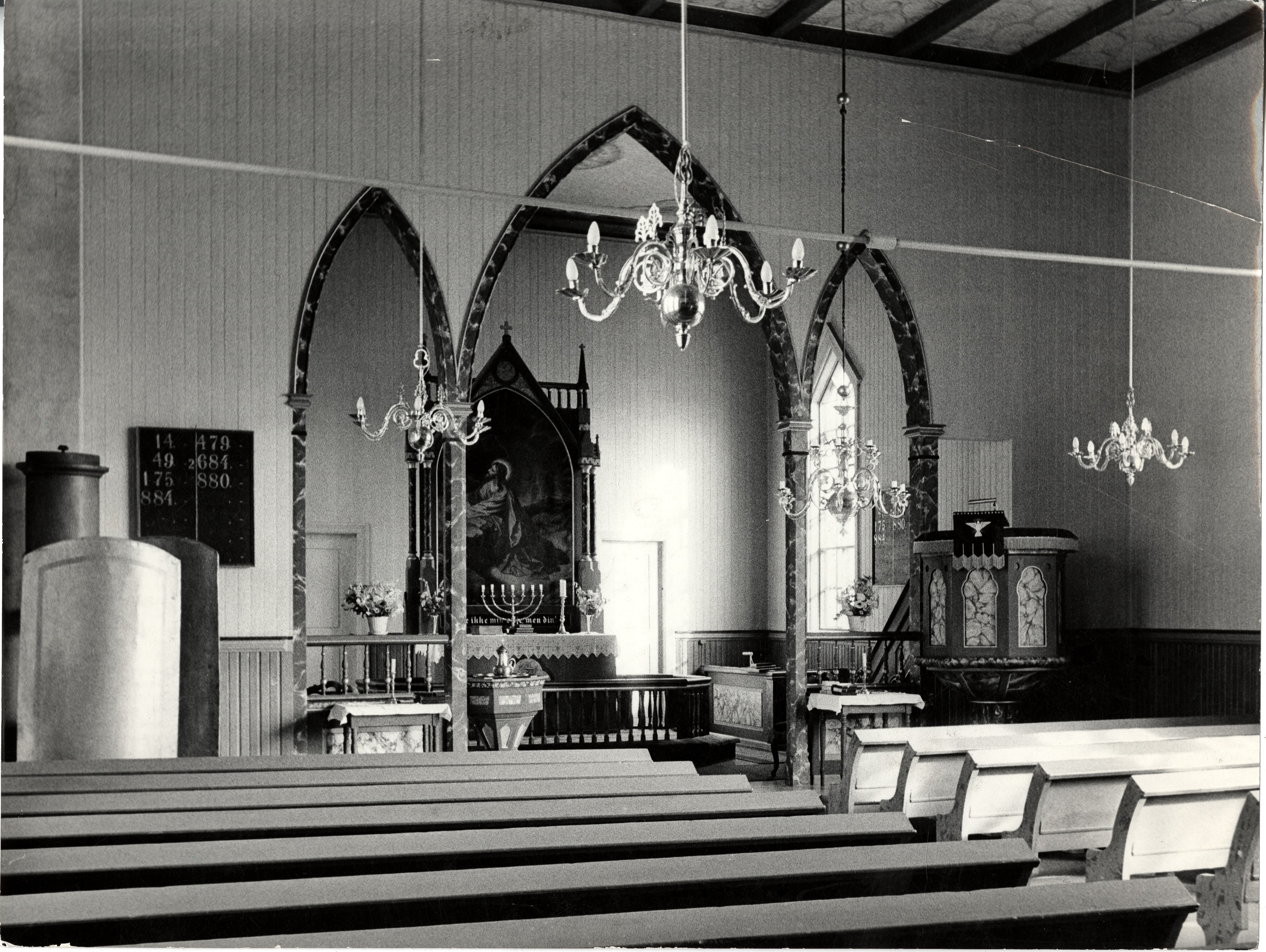

== See also ==
- List of churches in Nidaros
