= Knarrlaget =

Village in Hitra Municipality, Norway

Knarrlaget Knarrlagsund
- Village
- Interactive map of Knarrlaget
- Location within Trøndelag Location within Norway
- Coordinates: 63.6643°N 09.0803°E
- Country: Norway
- Region: Central Norway
- County: Trøndelag
- District: Fosen
- Municipality: Hitra Municipality
- Elevation: 14 m (46 ft)
- Time zone: UTC+01:00 (CET)
  - Summer (DST): UTC+02:00 (CEST)
- Post Code: 7242 Knarrlagsund

Knarrlaget or Knarrlagsund is a village on the island of Ulvøya in Hitra Municipality in Trøndelag county, Norway. It is located on the southern part of the island about 2.5 kilometres (1.6 mi) east of the village of Ulvan.

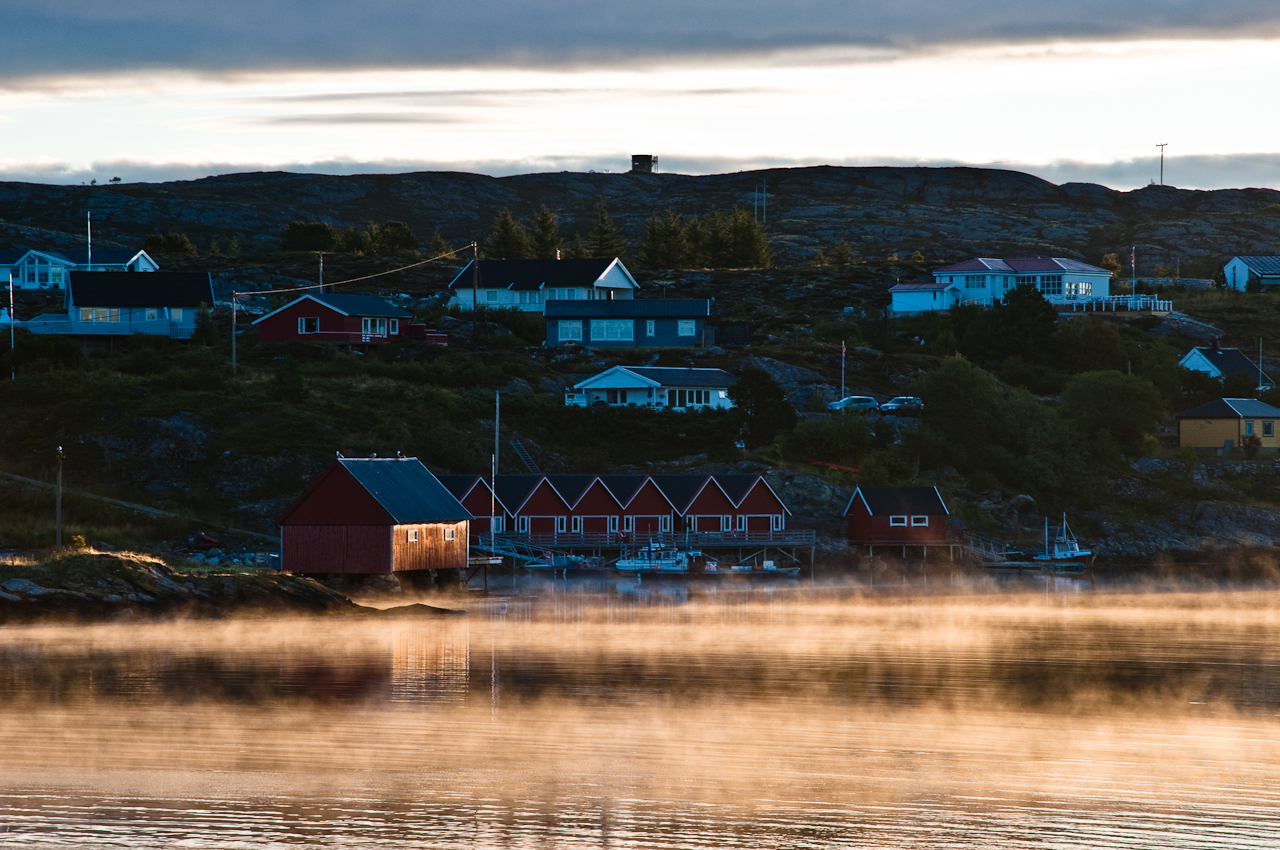
View of the village

The village lies along the Knarrlagsundet strait which separates the islands of Ulvøya and Fjellværsøya. There is a bridge across the strait at Knarrlaget.
