= Vernes, Trøndelag =

Village in Orkland Municipality, Norway

Vernes Agdenes
- Village
- Interactive map of Vernes
- Location within Trøndelag Location within Norway
- Coordinates: 63.5824°N 09.5153°E
- Country: Norway
- Region: Central Norway
- County: Trøndelag
- District: Fosen
- Municipality: Orkland Municipality
- Elevation: 17 m (56 ft)
- Time zone: UTC+01:00 (CET)
  - Summer (DST): UTC+02:00 (CEST)
- Post Code: 7318 Agdenes

Vernes (sometimes called Agdenes) is a village in Orkland Municipality in Trøndelag county, Norway.

== Location ==
The village is located on the end of the Vernes peninsula which sits at junction of the Verrafjorden and the Trondheimsleia. The village is the site of the Agdenes Church and the Vernes ferry quay which has regular connections to the islands of Leksa, Storfosna, and Garten to the north. Vernes is about 8 kilometres (5.0 mi) west of the village of Vassbygda.
