= Råkvåg =

Village in Indre Fosen Municipality, Norway

Råkvåg Råkvågen
- Village
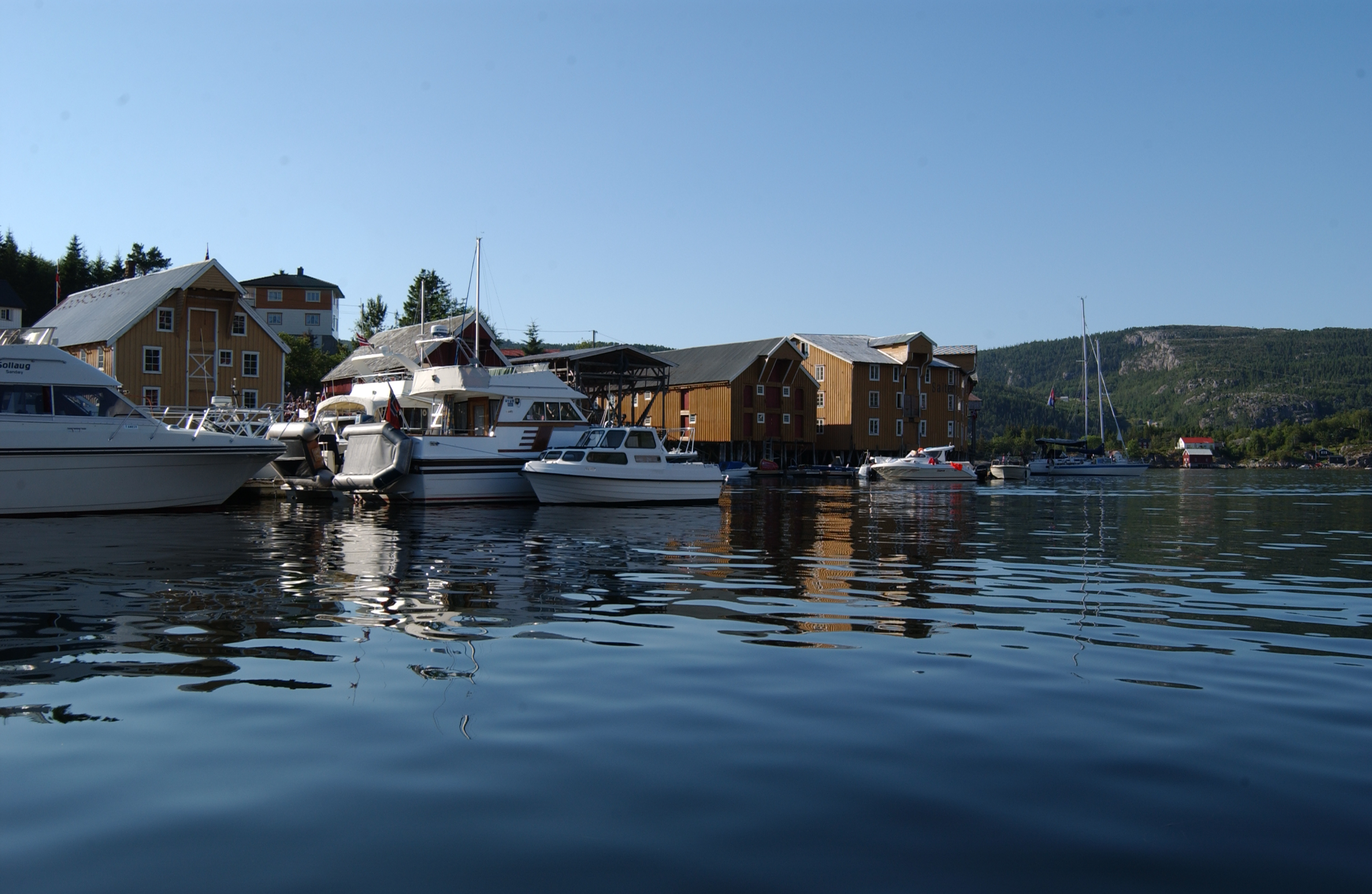
- View of the village
- Interactive map of Råkvåg
- Location within Trøndelag Location within Norway
- Coordinates: 63.7621°N 10.0761°E
- Country: Norway
- Region: Central Norway
- County: Trøndelag
- District: Fosen
- Municipality: Indre Fosen

Area
  - Total: 0.37 km^{2} (0.14 sq mi)
- Elevation: 14 m (46 ft)

Population (2024)
  - Total: 230
  - Density: 622/km^{2} (1,610/sq mi)
- Time zone: UTC+01:00 (CET)
  - Summer (DST): UTC+02:00 (CEST)
- Post Code: 7114 Råkvåg

Råkvåg (Norwegian pronunciation: [ˈrôkvoːɡ]) is a village in Indre Fosen Municipality in Trøndelag county, Norway. It is located at the inner part of the Stjørnfjorden in the northern part of what was the old Rissa Municipality. It is about 4 kilometres (2.5 mi) north of the village of Husbysjøen and about 10 kilometres (6.2 mi) east of the village of Høybakken in the neighboring Ørland Municipality. The Ramsvik Church lies just south of the village.

The 0.37-square-kilometre (91-acre) village has a population (2024) of 230 and a population density of 622 inhabitants per square kilometre (1,610/sq mi).

Råkvåg is popular with boat owners. It has become a tradition to meet here on one weekend during the summer (known as Råkvåg-dagene), when boats of all sizes and people of all ages gather to relax and socialize. Råkvåg-dagene is usually organized the last weekend of July.

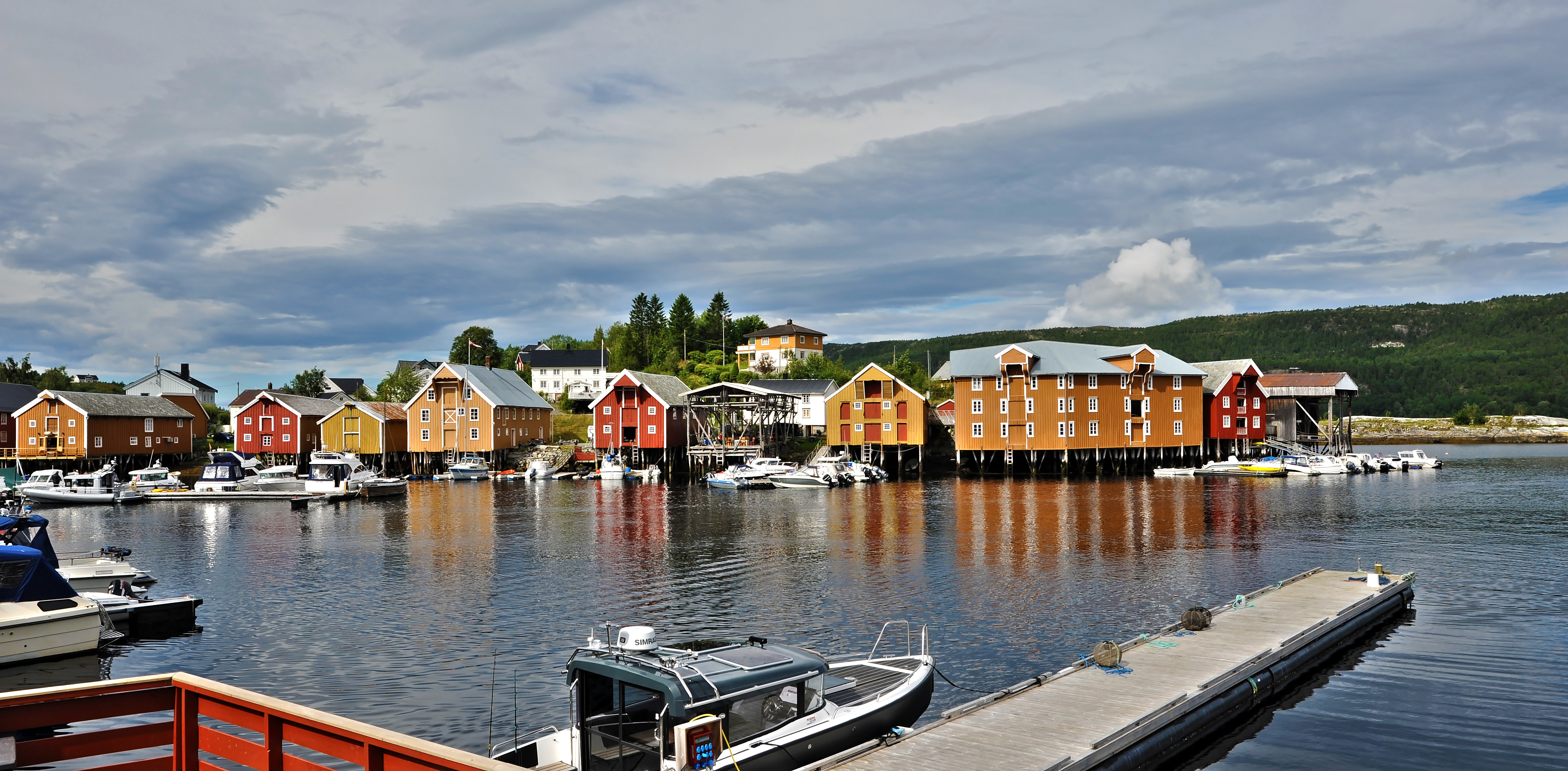
View of Råkvåg

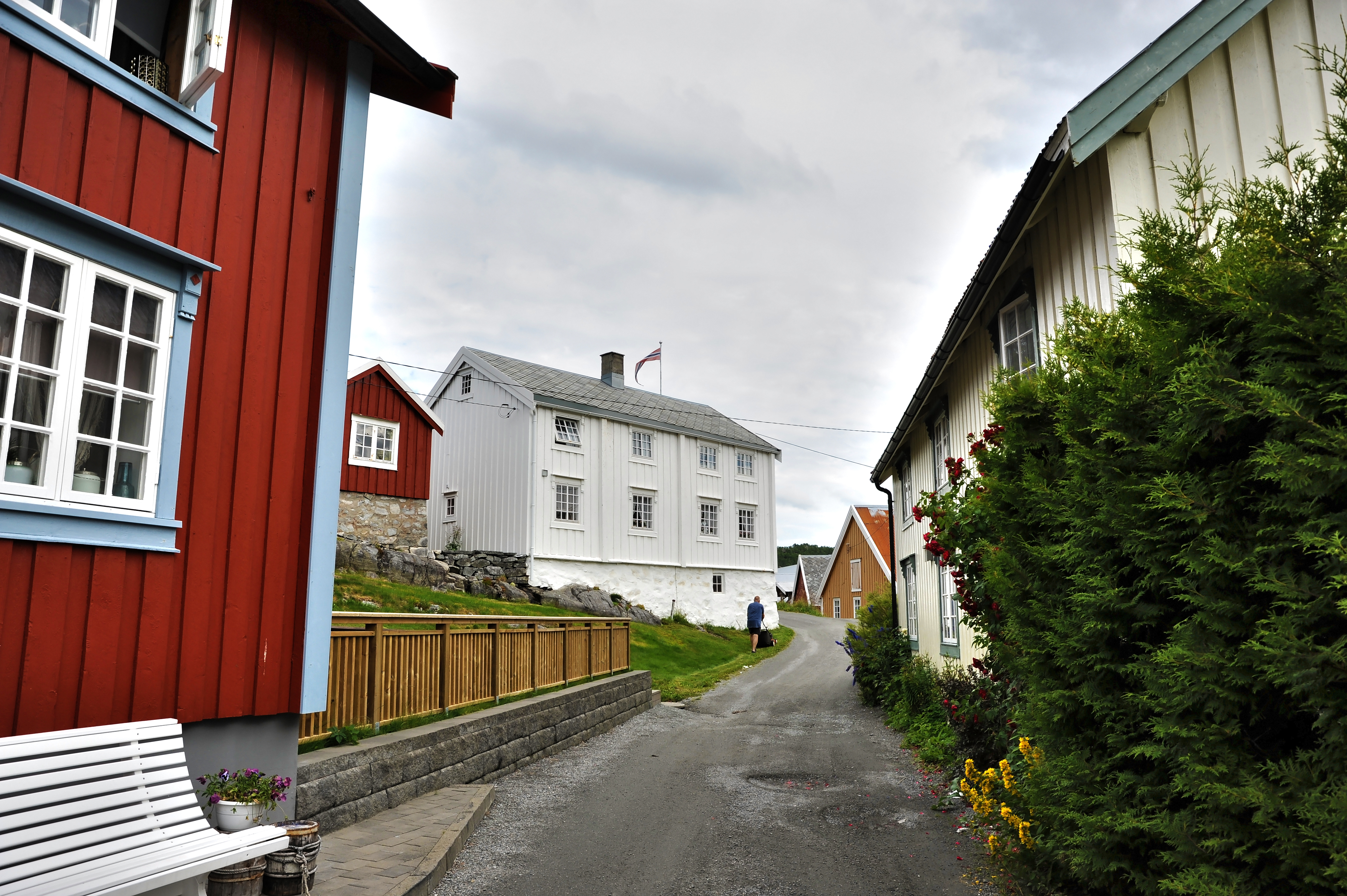
View of Råkvåg
