= Hasselvika =

Village in Indre Fosen Municipality, Norway

- Village
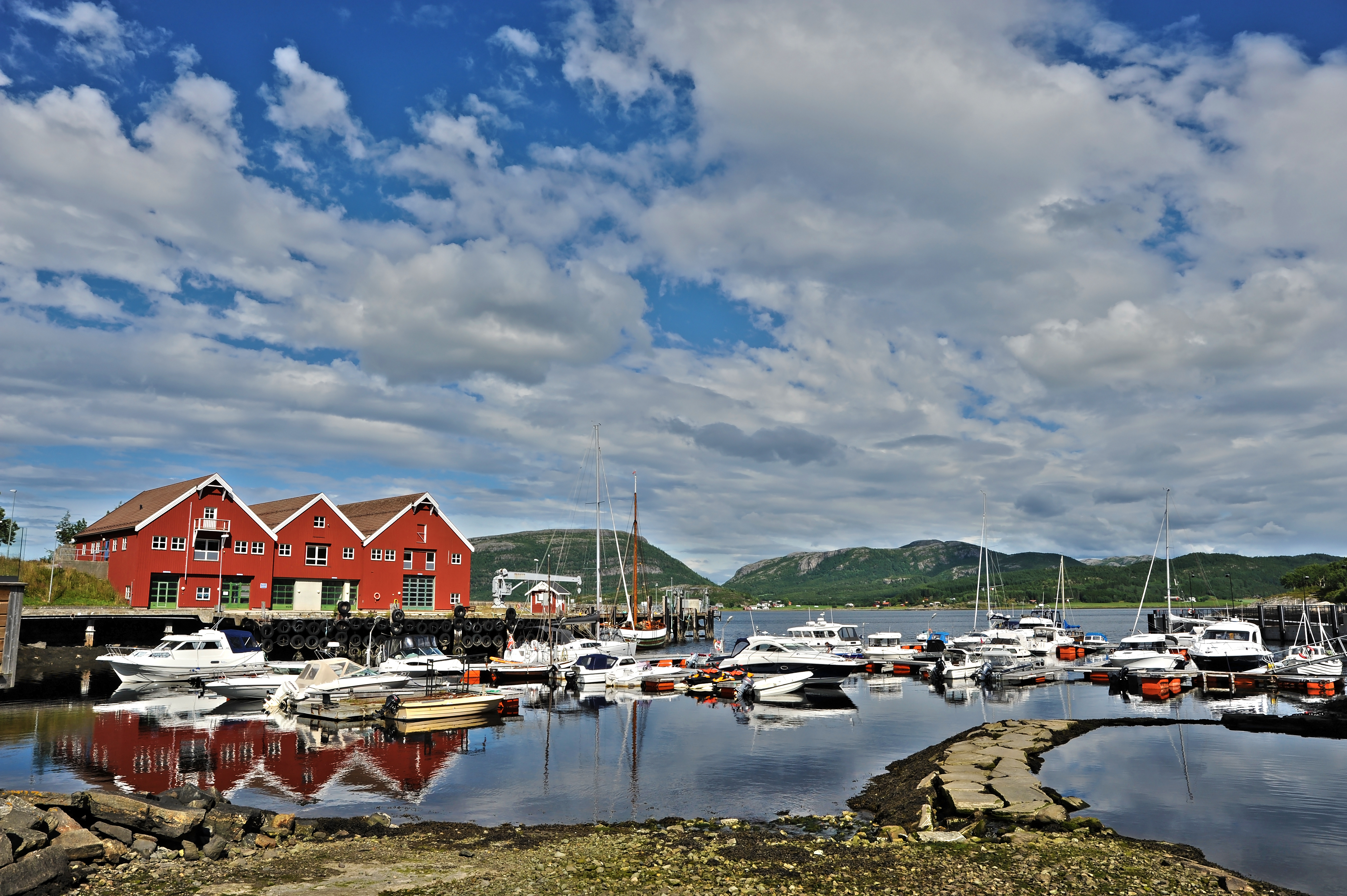
- View of the village
- Interactive map of Hasselvika
- Location within Trøndelag Location within Norway
- Coordinates: 63.6315°N 09.8253°E
- Country: Norway
- Region: Central Norway
- County: Trøndelag
- District: Fosen
- Municipality: Indre Fosen
- Elevation: 8 m (26 ft)
- Time zone: UTC+01:00 (CET)
  - Summer (DST): UTC+02:00 (CEST)
- Post Code: 7112 Hasselvika

Hasselvika is a village in Indre Fosen Municipality in Trøndelag county, Norway. It is located along the Trondheimsfjord about 11 kilometres (6.8 mi) north of the municipal center of Årnset. It is the location of the old Agdenes festning military fort as well as the Hasselvika Church.
