= Leksvik =

Leksvik may refer to:

== Places ==
- Leksvik (village), a village in Indre Fosen Municipality in Trøndelag county, Norway
- Leksvik Church, a church in Indre Fosen Municipality in Trøndelag county, Norway
- Leksvik Municipality, a former municipality in the old Nord-Trøndelag county, Norway
