= Verdalselva =

River in Trøndelag, Norway

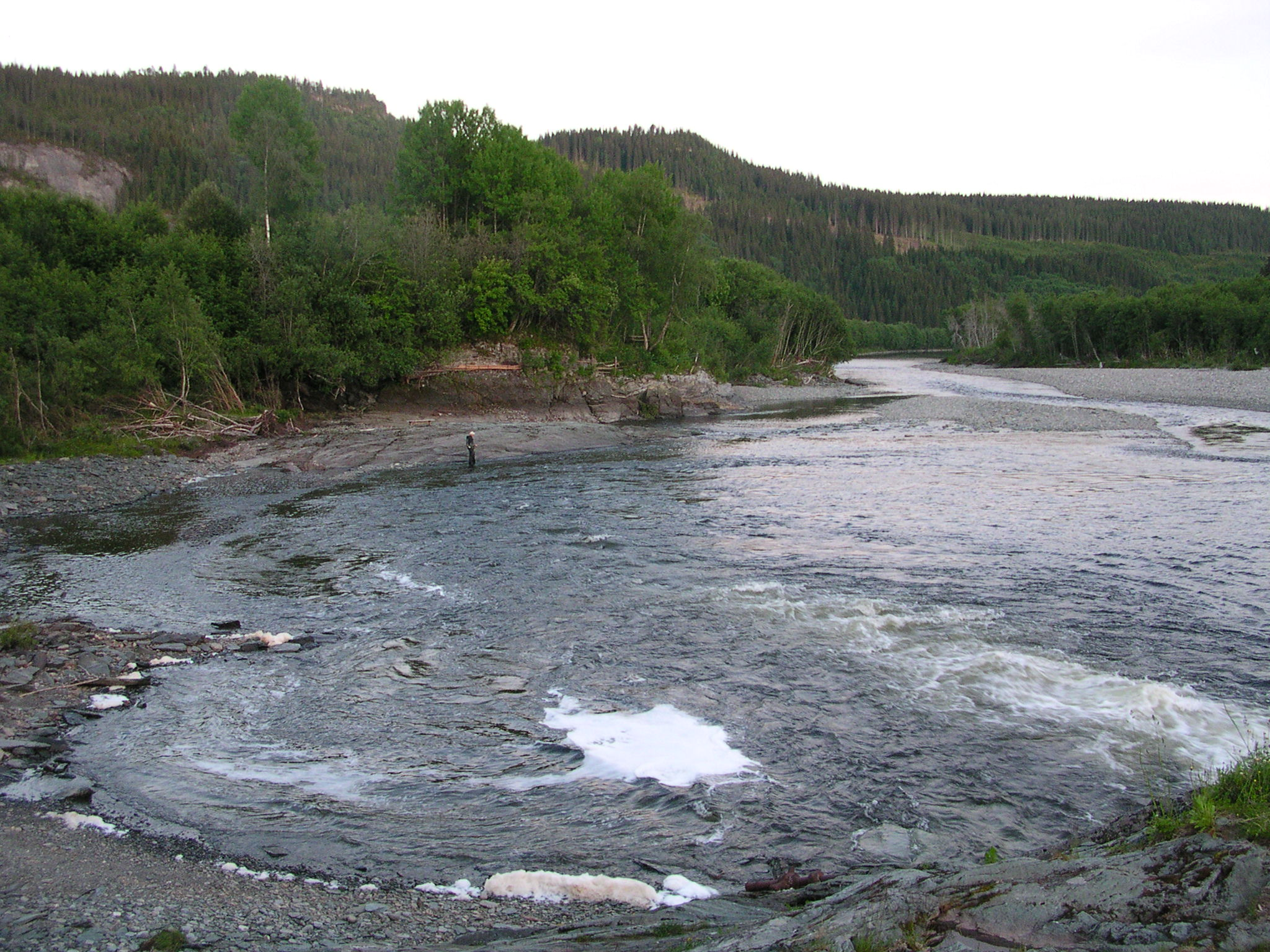
- Interactive map of the river

Location
- Country: Norway
- County: Trøndelag
- Municipality: Verdal Municipality

Physical characteristics
- Source: Confluence of Helgåa and Inna
  - location: Vuku, Verdal Municipality, Norway
  - coordinates: 63°46′34″N 11°44′21″E
  - elevation: 41 metres (135 ft)
- Mouth: Trondheimsfjord
  - location: Verdalsøra, Verdal Municipality, Norway
  - coordinates: 63°47′35″N 11°28′54″E
  - elevation: 0 metres (0 ft)
- Length: 21 km (13 mi)
- Basin size: 1,454 km^{2} (561 sq mi)

Verdalselva (English: Verdal River) is a 21-kilometre (13 mi) long river in Verdal Municipality in Trøndelag county, Norway. The river begins at Holmen in the village of Vuku at the confluence of the rivers Inna and Helgåa. The river Inna drains the lake Innsvatnet near the Swedish border and the river Helgåa runs from the lake Veresvatnet at the village of Vera. The river Verdalselva flows west into the Trondheimsfjord, after passing through the town of Verdalsøra. The river Verdalselva is one of the country's best for salmon fishing.

== See also ==
- List of rivers in Norway
