= Bjørn Lyng =

Norwegian industrialist

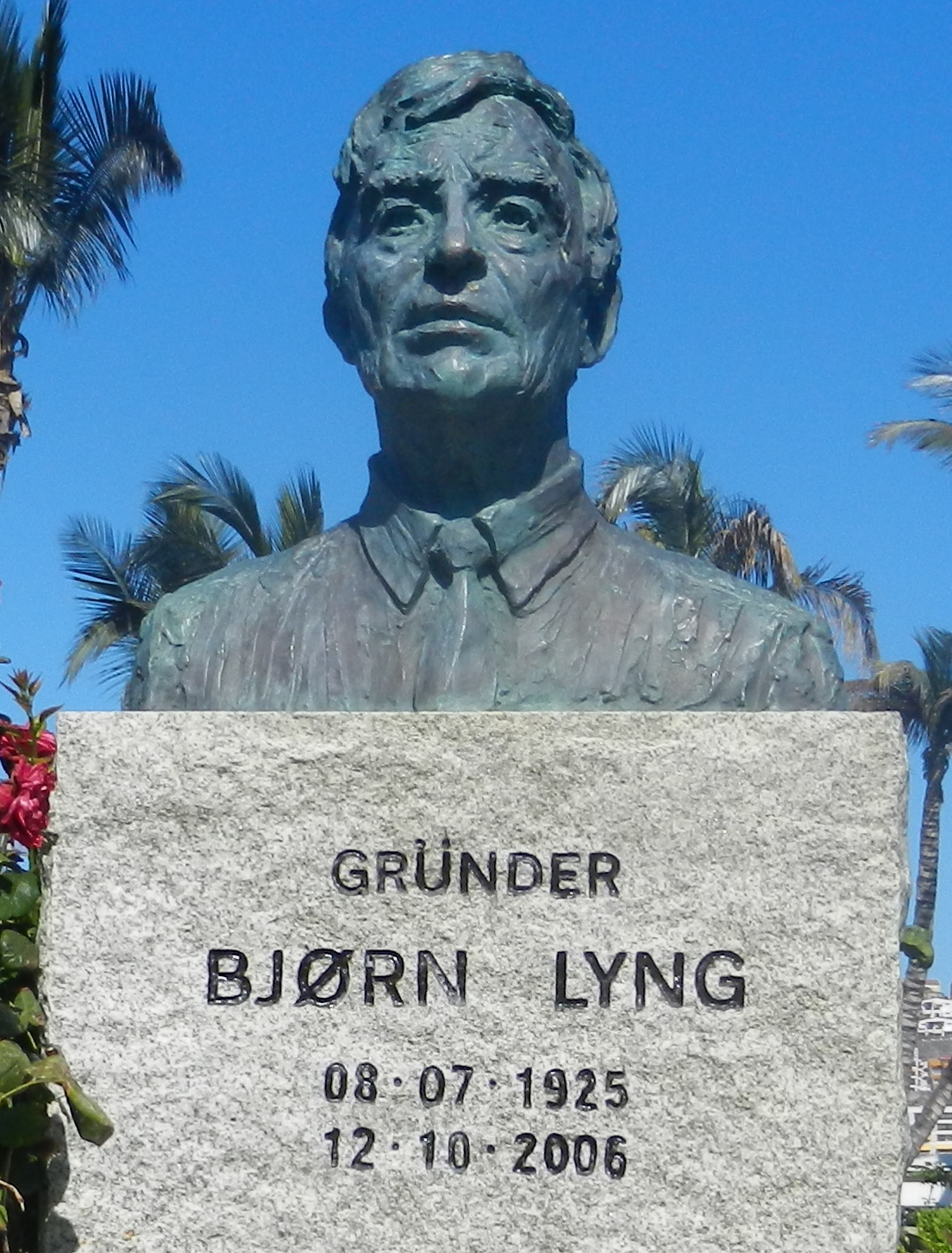
- Bust of Lyng in Arguineguín, Gran Canaria
- Born: 8 July 1925; Hurum Municipality in Buskerud, Norway
- Died: 12 October 2006 (aged 81); Gran Canaria in the Canary Islands
- Occupation: Businessman
- Relatives: John Lyng (cousin); Thor Heyerdahl (cousin)
- Awards: Order of St. Olav; Honorary citizen of the Canary Islands

Bjørn Lyng (8 July 1925 – 12 October 2006) was a Norwegian businessman, investor and industrialist. He was the founder of Lyng Gruppen AS, a holding company with over twenty subsidiaries. He is also associated with his development of vacation resorts located in Arguineguín along the south coast of Gran Canaria in the Canary Islands.

== Biography ==
He was born at Hurum Municipality in Buskerud county and grew up in Leksvik Municipality in Nord-Trøndelag county. He was the son of farmer Hagbart Hartmann Lyng (1877- 1961) and nurse Helene Charlotte Steffens (1897-1960). He was a cousin of Norwegian Prime Minister John Lyng and of ethnographer Thor Heyerdahl. During the German occupation of Norway he joined the resistance movement, and was arrested in 1944 and incarcerated at Vollan, Falstad and Grini. Both his parents were also imprisoned by the Nazis and held at Falstad for almost a year.

In 1947 he established Mekaniske Verksted, an iron foundry in Vanvikan and Trøndelag Emaljeverk in Rissa. In 1968, he started Lyng Industrier AS, a plastic pipe factory in Leksvik. He started Elsafe International in 1978 at Mosvik which eventually merged with VingCard to form VingCard Elsafe (now part of Assa Abloy). Lyng Electronics was founded in 1985 at Leksvik, but later moved to Vanvikan. In 1988, he founded the Anfi Group which developed the resorts Anfi del Mar and Anfi Tauro Gran Canaria in the Canary Islands.

== Honors ==
He was decorated Knight, First Class of the Order of St. Olav in 1985, and was an honorary citizen of the Canary Islands.
