= Ingebjørg Karmhus =

Norwegian politician

Ingebjørg Karmhus (21 December 1936 – 26 February 2009) was a Norwegian politician for the Centre Party.

She was born in Leksvik Municipality as a daughter of Sverre Karmhus (1897–1974) and Karen Nicoline Bjerkan. She took basic education in Leksvik before attending Nesna Teachers' College for four years and the Norwegian Conservatory of Music for two and a half years. She worked as a teacher in Leksvik, Grav, and Rosenborg.

She was the mayor of Leksvik Municipality from 1986 to 1999. She served as a deputy representative to the Parliament of Norway from Nord-Trøndelag during the term 1989–1993. In total she met during 162 days of parliamentary session.
