= Helgåa =

River in Trøndelag, Norway

Location
- Country: Norway
- County: Trøndelag
- Municipality: Verdal Municipality

Physical characteristics
- Source: Veresvatnet
  - location: Vera, Verdal Municipality, Norway
  - coordinates: 63°47′35″N 12°21′32″E
  - elevation: 361 metres (1,184 ft)
- Mouth: Verdalselva
  - location: Vuku, Verdal Municipality, Norway
  - coordinates: 63°46′34″N 11°44′21″E
  - elevation: 41 metres (135 ft)
- Length: 44 km (27 mi)

Basin features
- Tributaries
  - left: Heståa, Juldøla
  - right: Skjækra, Tverråa

Helgåa is a river in Verdal Municipality in Trøndelag county, Norway. The river begins at the lake Veresvatnet and runs through the valley Helgådalen for about 44 kilometres (27 mi) to Holmen in the village of Vuku, where it merges with the river Inna to create the river Verdalselva. At Granfossen there is a fish ladder.

== See also ==
- List of rivers in Norway
