= Ole Jonsen Hindrum =

Norwegian builder and architect

- Born: c. 1625; Hindrem, Leksvik, Norway
- Died: Trøndelag, Norway
- Occupation: Architect

Ole Jonsen Hindrum was a Norwegian builder and architect. He was a noted church builder in Trøndelag county, particularly specializing in the rare and unique Y-shaped floor plan.

Ole Jonsen Hindrum was born around the year 1625 in Hindrem in the prestegjeld of Leksvik in Trøndelag, Norway. He was active as a church builder during the second half of the 17th century and thus built or participated in the construction of a number of church buildings in Trøndelag. He was also involved in repairs to the spire of the Nidaros Cathedral in 1686, 1687, and 1690.

== Works ==
- 1649: Oppdal Church
- 1651: Meldal Church (burned down in 1981, a copy rebuilt in 1988)
- 1653: Hindrum Church (torn down in 1895)
- 1654: Vuku Church
- 1667: Leksvik Church
- 1669: Rennebu Church (Y-shape)
- 1670: Horg Church (Y-shape; torn down in 1894)
- 1673: Leinstrand Church
- 1696: Tydal Church (Y-shape)
