= Veresvatnet =

Lake in Verdal, Norway

Veresvatnet Veressjøen
- Interactive map of the lake
- Location: Verdal Municipality, Trøndelag
- Coordinates: 63.7932°N 12.3591°E
- Primary inflows: Strådøla
- Primary outflows: Helgåa
- Basin countries: Norway
- Max. length: 3 kilometres (1.9 mi)
- Max. width: 3 kilometres (1.9 mi)
- Surface area: 6.5 km^{2} (2.5 sq mi)
- Shore length^{1}: 12.6 kilometres (7.8 mi)
- Surface elevation: 360 metres (1,180 ft)
- References: NVE
- ^{1} Shore length is not a well-defined measure.

Veresvatnet or Veressjøen is a lake in Verdal Municipality in Trøndelag county, Norway. The lake lies in the eastern part of the municipality, just west of the border with Sweden and just south of Blåfjella–Skjækerfjella National Park. The 6.5-square-kilometre (2.5 sq mi) lake sits at an elevation of 360 metres (1,180 ft) above sea level, and it is considered to be one of the headwaters of the Verdalselva river since the lake's water flows out into the river Helgåa which later joins the Verdalselva. The village of Vera and the Vera Chapel lie on the northern shores of the lake.

== See also ==
- List of lakes in Norway
