= Christopher Winther Scheen =

Norwegian politician

Christopher Winther Scheen (27 January 1809 – 9 September 1850) was a Norwegian clergyman and politician.

== Personal life ==
Christopher Winther Scheen was born in Risør in 1809. His father was merchant Helje Scheen. Christopher married twice. His first wife was Marie Wleugell, two years younger and from Risør. His second wife was named Marie Dorthea Nannestad.

== Career ==
Juell finished upper secondary school in Drammen in 1828 and enrolled as a student the same year. He graduated as cand.theol. in 1833. He was appointed chaplain at Veøy Church in 1835 and vicar in Lexvigen Church in 1840. While stationed here he was elected to the Norwegian Parliament in 1845 and 1848, representing the constituency of Nordre Trondhjems Amt. In 1849 he was appointed vicar for the churches in Porsgrund, replacing Daniel Bremer Juell who had left to become bishop in Northern Norway. However, Scheen died only one year after his appointment and did not have the chance to start his work. He was buried in Porsgrund.
