= Einar Strøm (politician) =

Norwegian politician

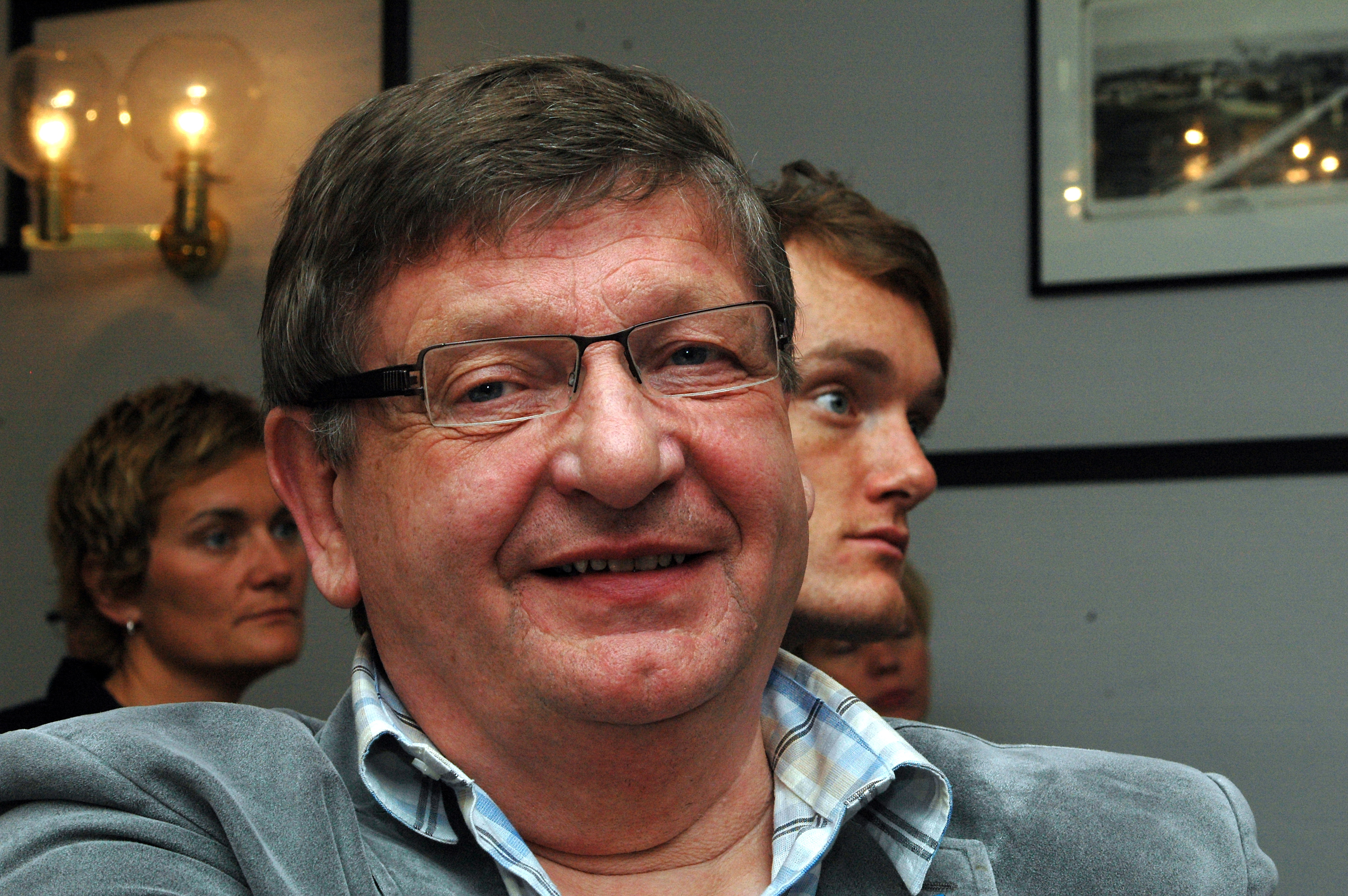
Einar Strøm

Einar Strøm (born 2 March 1945) is a Norwegian politician for the Centre Party.

He served as a deputy representative to the Norwegian Parliament from Nord-Trøndelag during the term 2001–2005.

On the local level he is mayor of Leksvik Municipality since 2007. He held the same position before the 2003 elections. Between the two mayoral posts, he was Councilor of Economics, Planning and Regional Development for the county cabinet of Nord-Trøndelag.
