= Leinstrand Church =

Church in Trøndelag, Norway

- Leinstrand kirke
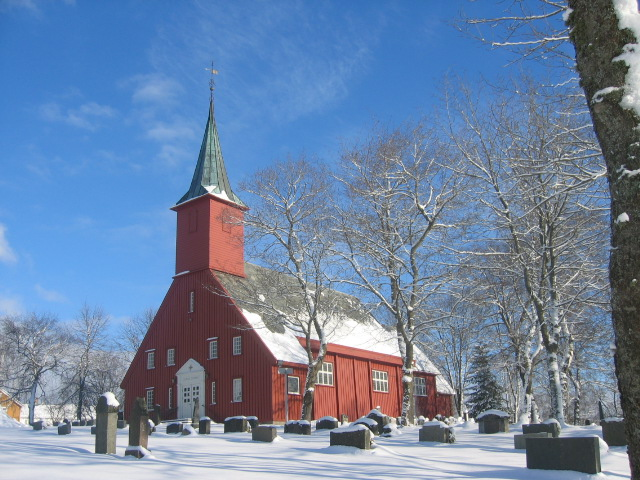
- View of the church
- Leinstrand Church
- 63°19′41.7″N 10°18′23.8″E
- Location: Trondheim Municipality, Trøndelag
- Country: Norway
- Denomination: Church of Norway
- Churchmanship: Evangelical Lutheran

History
- Status: Parish church
- Founded: 14th century
- Consecrated: 17 Sept 1673

Architecture
- Functional status: Active
- Architect: Ole Jonsen Hindrum
- Architectural type: Long church
- Completed: 1673 (353 years ago)

Specifications
- Capacity: 200
- Materials: Wood

Administration
- Diocese: Nidaros bispedømme
- Deanery: Heimdal og Byåsen prosti
- Parish: Byneset og Leinstrand
- Norwegian Cultural Heritage Site
- Type: Church
- Status: Automatically protected
- ID: 84279

Leinstrand Church (Norwegian: Leinstrand kirke) is a parish church of the Church of Norway in Trondheim Municipality in Trøndelag county, Norway. It is located in the village of Nypan, about 12 kilometres (7.5 mi) south of the city of Trondheim. It is one of the churches for the Byneset og Leinstrand parish which is part of the Heimdal og Byåsen prosti (deanery) in the Diocese of Nidaros. The red, wooden church was built in a long church style in 1673 by the architect Ole Jonsen Hindrum. The church seats about 200 people.

== History ==
The earliest existing historical records of the church date back to the year 1533, but the church was not new that year. The old church may have been built during the 14th or 15th century. Not much is known about the old church except that it was likely built about 100 metres (330 ft) northeast of the present church site. In 1673, the old church was torn down and a new wooden long church was built about 100 m (330 ft) southwest of the old church location. The building was consecrated on 17 September 1673. In 1783, parts of the church collapsed due to a weak foundation and shifting soil. The following summer, the church was rebuilt on the same site with a reinforced foundation, mostly using recycled materials from the old church. At the same time, the church was enlarged and restored. From 1831 to 1837, the church underwent a large renovation. In 1905, a new tower on the west side of the building was constructed and at the same time, the old flat ceiling above the nave was replaced with a vaulted ceiling.

== Media gallery ==
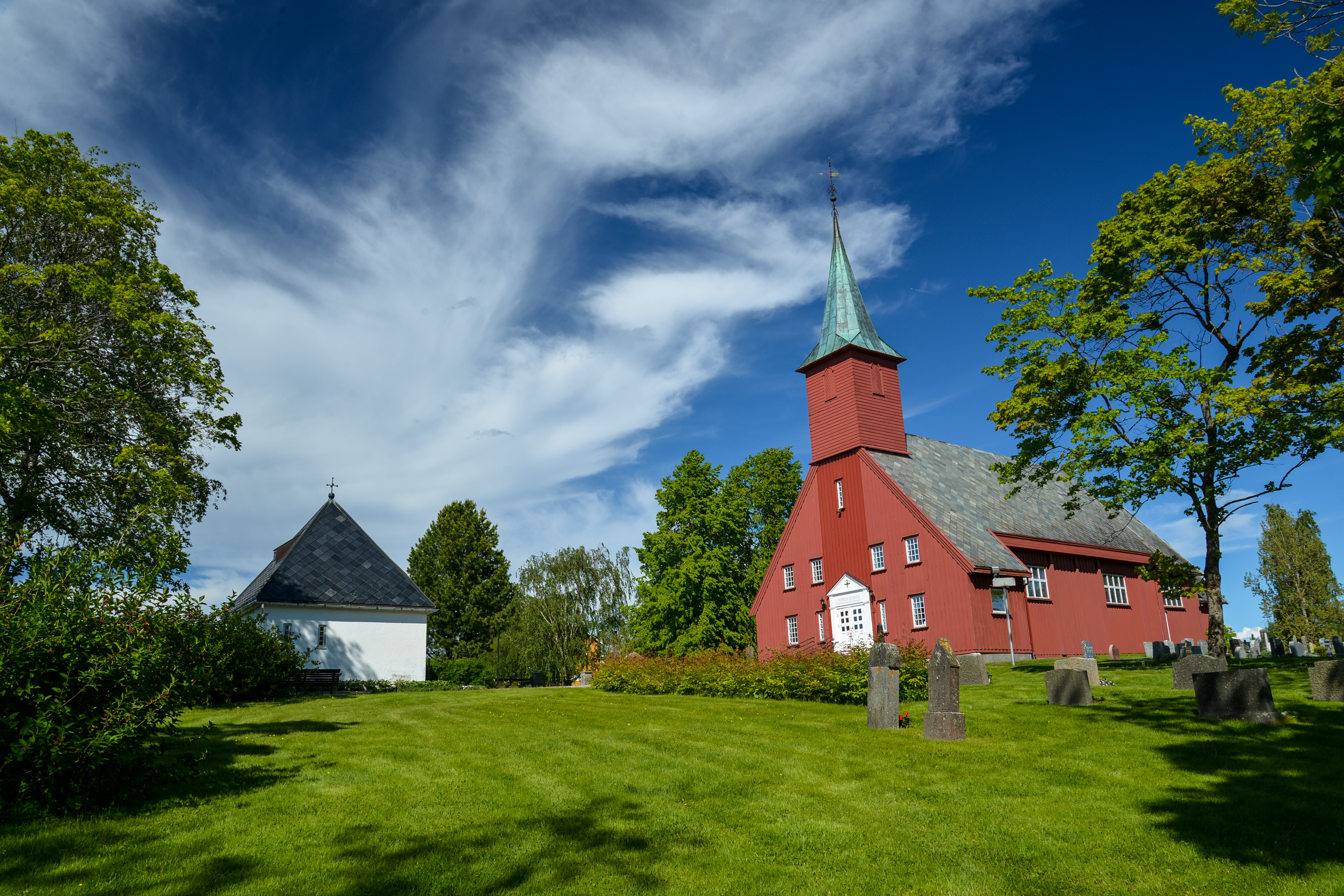
Exterior view

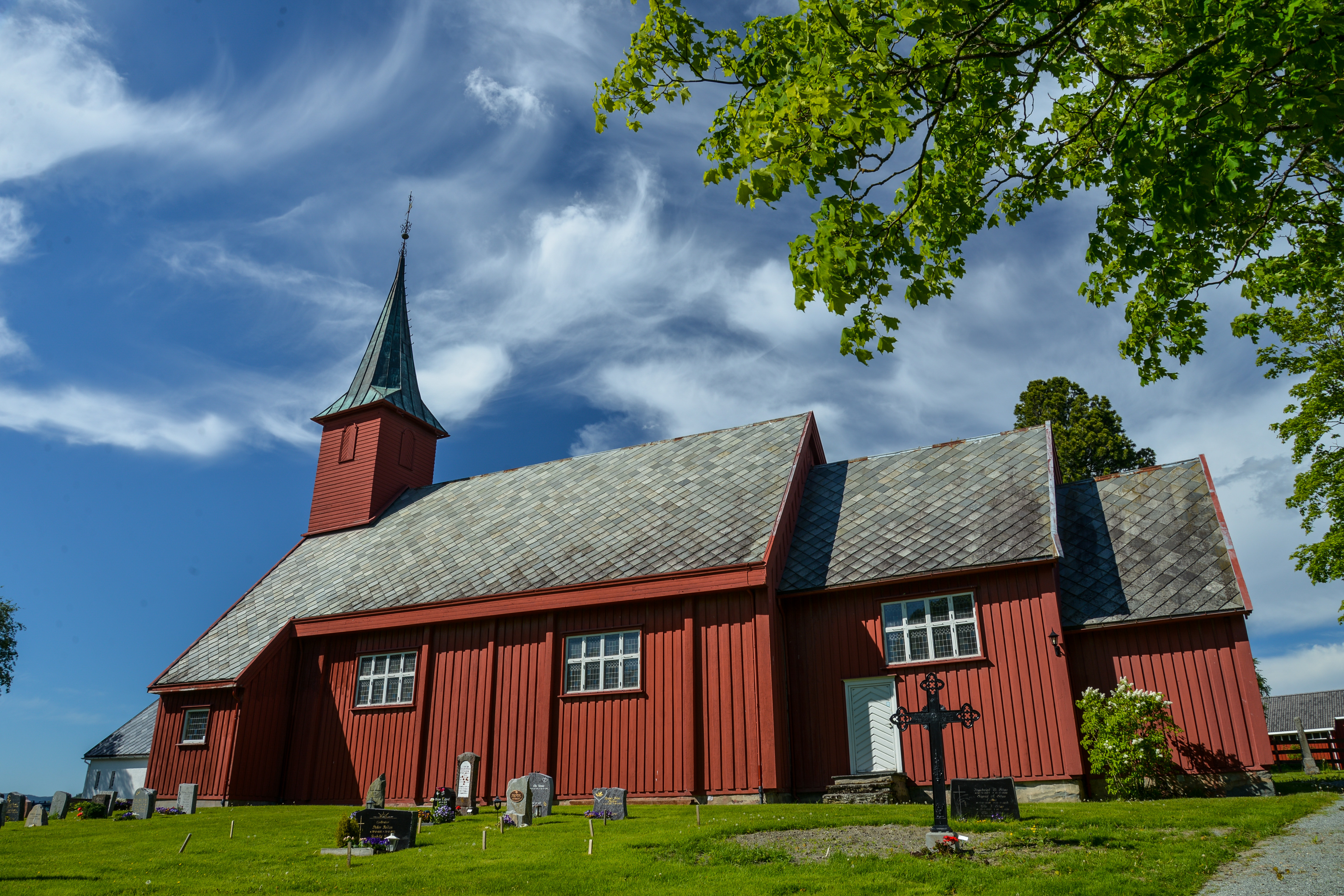
Side exterior view

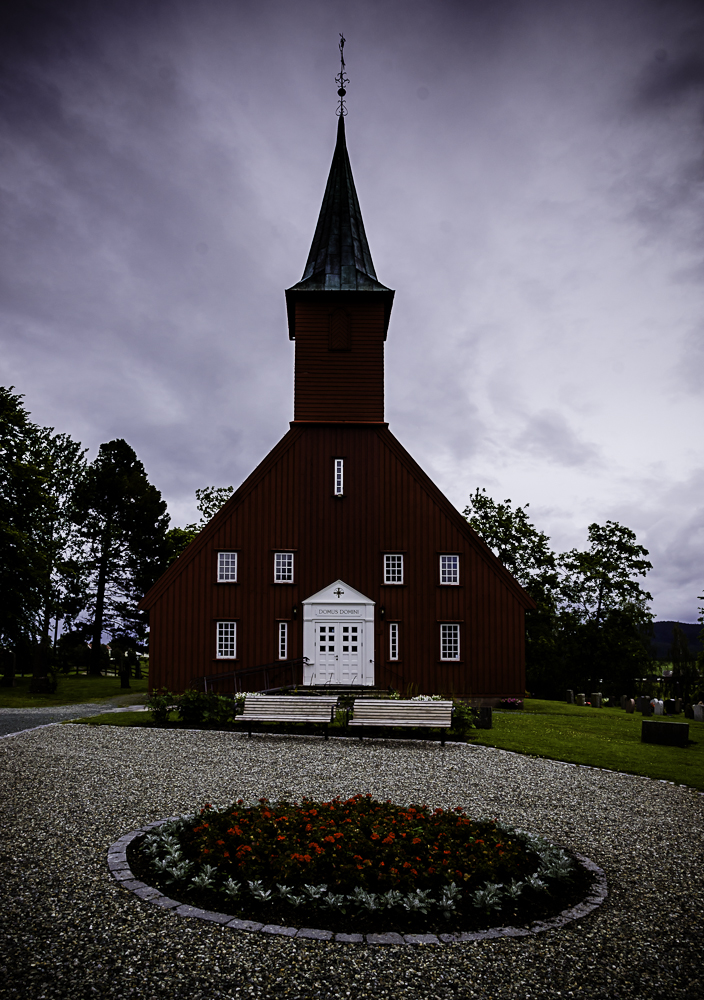
Front exterior view

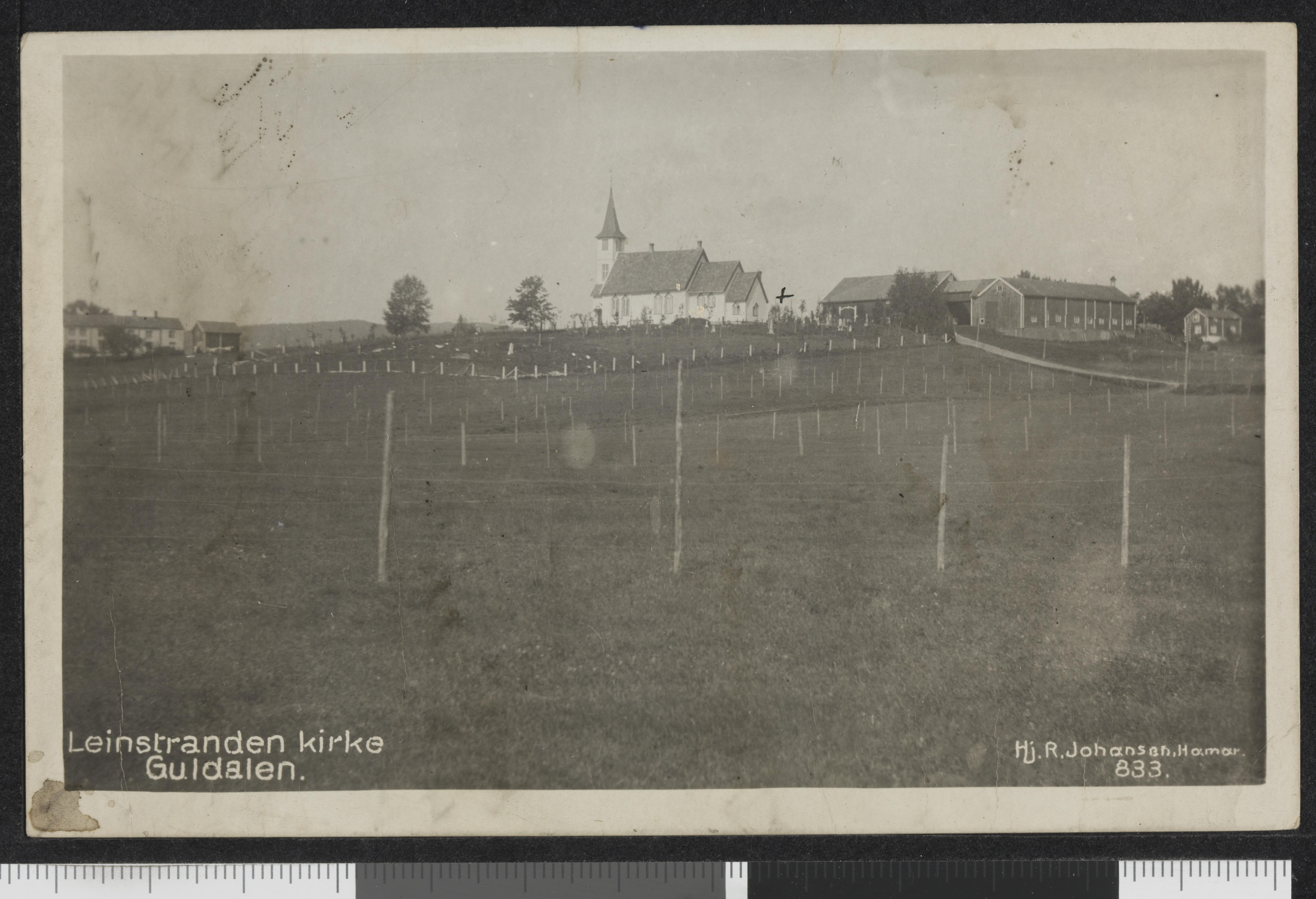
Exterior view (c. 1910)

== See also ==
- List of churches in Nidaros
