= Vuku =

Village in Verdal Municipality, Norway

- Village
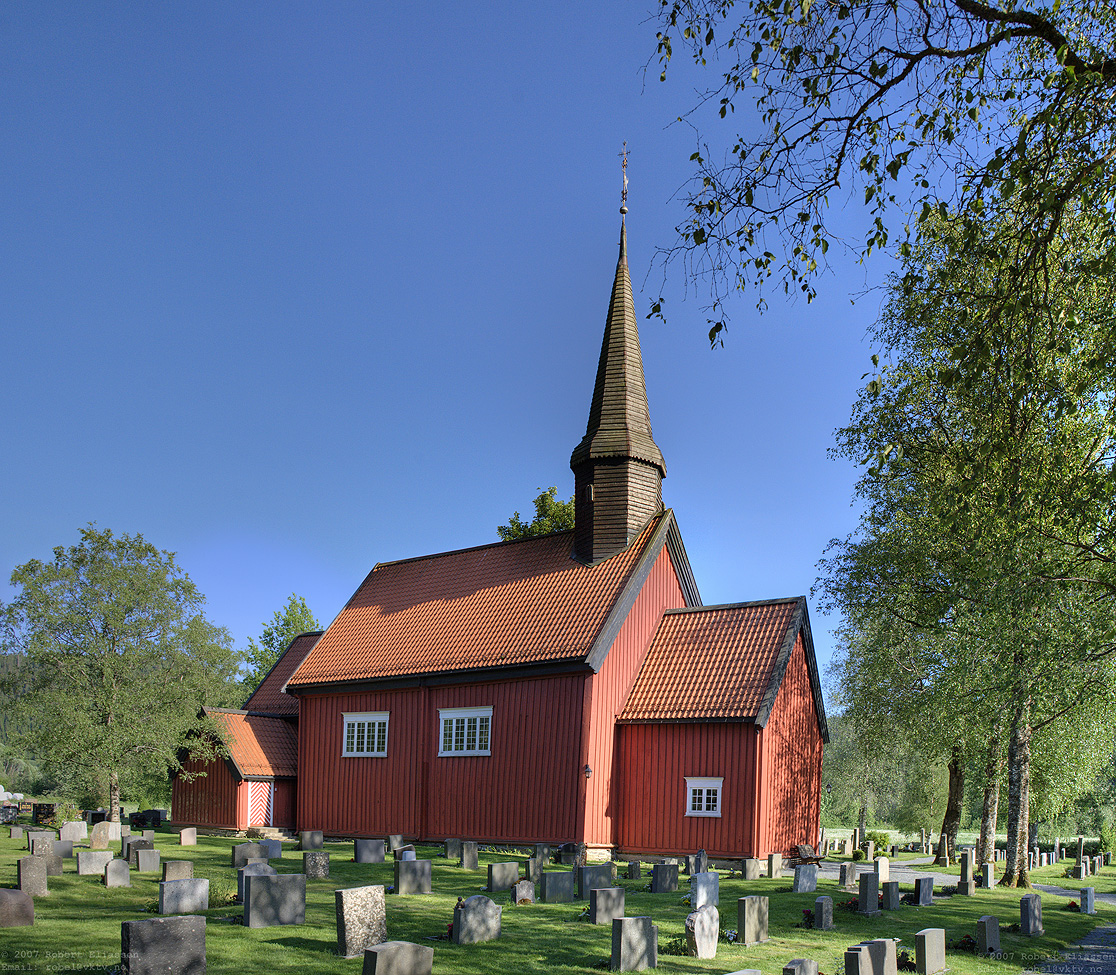
- View of the village church
- Interactive map of Vuku
- Location within Trøndelag Location within Norway
- Coordinates: 63.7763°N 11.7394°E
- Country: Norway
- Region: Central Norway
- County: Trøndelag
- District: Innherred
- Municipality: Verdal Municipality

Area
  - Total: 0.24 km^{2} (0.093 sq mi)
- Elevation: 41 m (135 ft)

Population (2024)
  - Total: 250
  - Density: 1,042/km^{2} (2,700/sq mi)
- Time zone: UTC+01:00 (CET)
  - Summer (DST): UTC+02:00 (CEST)
- Post Code: 7660 Vuku

Vuku is a village in Verdal Municipality in Trøndelag county, Norway. It is located at the confluence of the rivers Helgåa and Inna where they become the Verdalselva river. The village is located about 40 kilometres (25 mi) west of the village of Vera and about 15 kilometres (9.3 mi) east of the town of Verdalsøra. Vuku is also a Church of Norway parish covering the central part of Verdal Municipality, with Vuku Church located in this village.

The 0.24-square-kilometre (59-acre) village has a population (2024) of 250 and a population density of 1,042 inhabitants per square kilometre (2,700/sq mi).

== History ==
In the late 1800s, a group of parish members immigrated to the United States, where they established a sister church in what is now Foxhome, Minnesota. In 2015, the members of the Minnesotan Vukku Lutheran Church celebrated 125 years of history.

== Notable people ==
- Jon Olav Hjelde, former Premier League footballer, grew up in Vuku and played for Vuku until he was signed by Rosenborg, then the biggest club in Norway. Later he got signed by Nottingham Forest.

== Climate ==
Climate data for Verdal - Reppe 1992–2018 (81 m, extremes 1971-2018 includes earlier stations)
Month	Jan	Feb	Mar	Apr	May	Jun	Jul	Aug	Sep	Oct	Nov	Dec	Year
Record high °C (°F)	12 (54)	12.5 (54.5)	14.7 (58.5)	20.1 (68.2)	28.6 (83.5)	29.8 (85.6)	33 (91)	30.4 (86.7)	27 (81)	22.5 (72.5)	15.8 (60.4)	12.9 (55.2)	33 (91)
Mean daily maximum °C (°F)	0.6 (33.1)	0.7 (33.3)	3.7 (38.7)	8.7 (47.7)	13.9 (57.0)	17 (63)	20.4 (68.7)	19.3 (66.7)	14.8 (58.6)	8.7 (47.7)	3.7 (38.7)	1.4 (34.5)	9.4 (49.0)
Daily mean °C (°F)	−2 (28)	−2.2 (28.0)	−0.3 (31.5)	3.9 (39.0)	8.5 (47.3)	12.2 (54.0)	15 (59)	14.3 (57.7)	10.2 (50.4)	5 (41)	1.2 (34.2)	−1.1 (30.0)	5.4 (41.7)
Mean daily minimum °C (°F)	−4.9 (23.2)	−4.8 (23.4)	−3 (27)	0.8 (33.4)	4.8 (40.6)	8.2 (46.8)	11.2 (52.2)	10.7 (51.3)	7.6 (45.7)	3.1 (37.6)	−1.2 (29.8)	−4.1 (24.6)	2.4 (36.3)
Record low °C (°F)	−26.4 (−15.5)	−25.4 (−13.7)	−20.5 (−4.9)	−14.7 (5.5)	−4 (25)	−1.2 (29.8)	1.8 (35.2)	0.2 (32.4)	−3.1 (26.4)	−8.8 (16.2)	−18.7 (−1.7)	−23 (−9)	−26.4 (−15.5)
Average precipitation mm (inches)	66 (2.6)	65 (2.6)	62 (2.4)	44 (1.7)	53 (2.1)	92 (3.6)	95 (3.7)	99 (3.9)	97 (3.8)	86 (3.4)	74 (2.9)	86 (3.4)	919 (36.1)
Source 1: Norwegian Meteorological Institute
Source 2: NOAA - WMO averages 91-2020 Norway
