= Innsvatnet =

Lake in Verdal, Norway

- Interactive map of the lake
- Location: Verdal Municipality, Trøndelag
- Coordinates: 63.6578°N 12.1994°E
- Primary inflows: Bellingsåa
- Primary outflows: Inna
- Basin countries: Norway
- Max. length: 5 kilometres (3.1 mi)
- Max. width: 2 kilometres (1.2 mi)
- Surface area: 3.9 km^{2} (1.5 sq mi)
- Shore length^{1}: 18.36 kilometres (11.41 mi)
- Surface elevation: 415 metres (1,362 ft)
- References: NVE
- ^{1} Shore length is not a well-defined measure.

Innsvatnet is a lake in Verdal Municipality in Trøndelag county, Norway. The lake lies in the eastern part of the municipality, just west of the border with Sweden. The lake is the headwaters for the river Inna, which later flows into the Verdalselva river. The 3.9-square-kilometre (1.5 sq mi) lake sits at an elevation of 415 metres (1,362 ft) above sea level.

== See also ==
- List of lakes in Norway
