= Inna (Verdal) =

River in Trøndelag, Norway

- Interactive map of the river

Location
- Country: Norway
- County: Trøndelag
- Municipality: Verdal Municipality

Physical characteristics
- Source: Innsvatnet
  - location: Verdal Municipality, Norway
  - coordinates: 63°39′28″N 12°11′57″E
  - elevation: 415 metres (1,362 ft)
- Mouth: Verdalselva
  - location: Vuku, Verdal Municipality, Norway
  - coordinates: 63°46′34″N 11°44′21″E
  - elevation: 41 metres (135 ft)
- Length: 30 km (19 mi)

Basin features
- Tributaries
  - left: Trongdøla, Tverråa
  - right: Kverna

Inna is a river that flows through Verdal Municipality in Trøndelag county, Norway. The river begins in the east at the lake Innsvatnet, located near the border to Sweden, and it runs west to the village of Vuku at the confluence of the rivers Inna and Helgåa, which together become the river Verdalselva. The river Inna runs through the Inndalen valley, through the villages of Sul, Garnes, Holmen, and ends at Vuku.

== See also ==
- List of rivers in Norway
