= Leksvik Municipality =

Former municipality in Nord-Trøndelag, Norway

Leksvik Municipality Leksvik kommune
- Former municipality
- Leksviken herred (historic name)
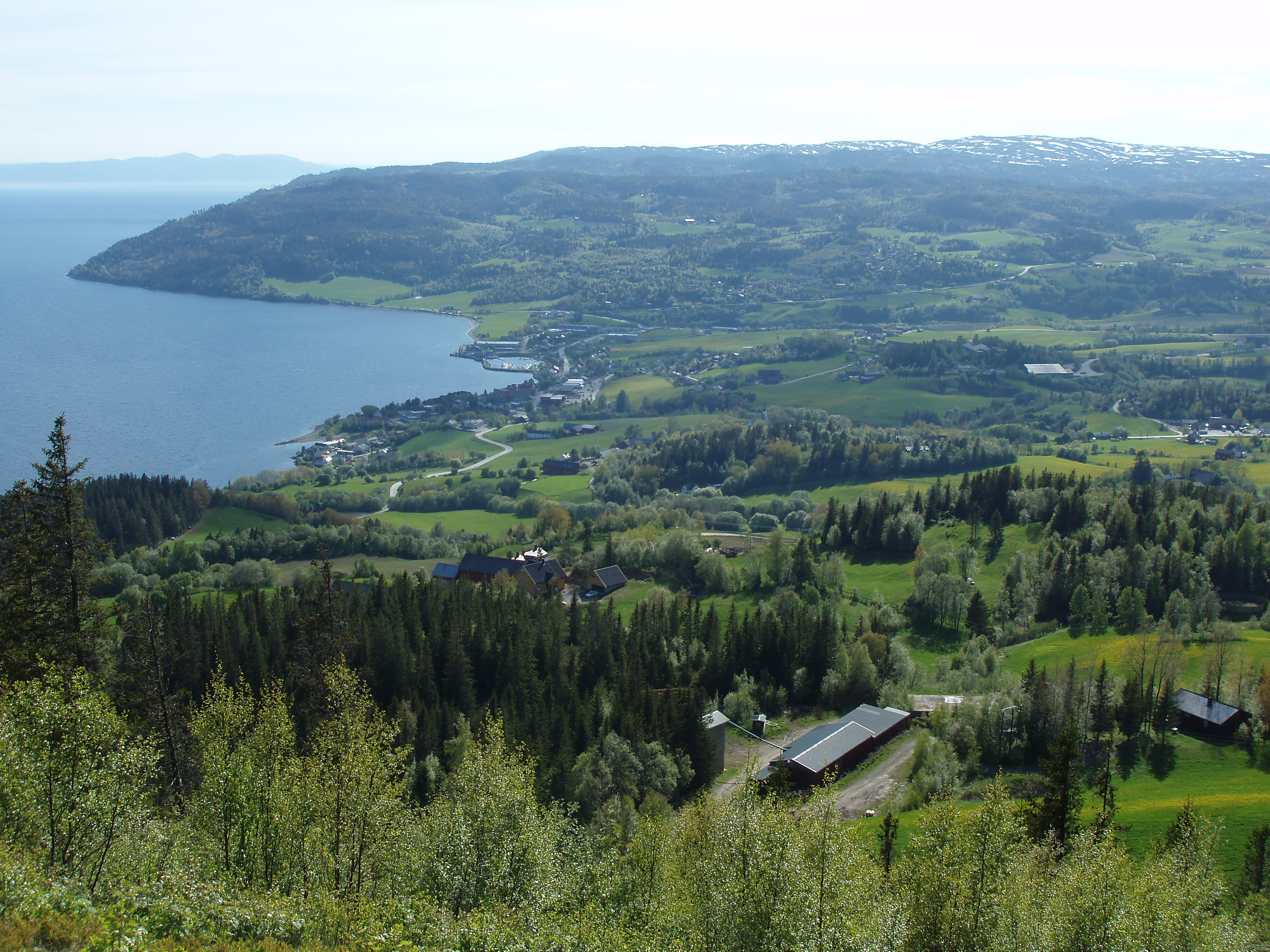
- View of the village of Leksvik

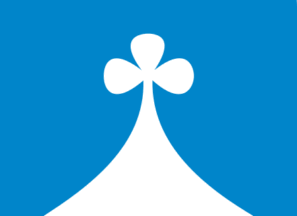
- Flag Coat of arms

- Nord-Trøndelag within Norway

- Leksvik within Nord-Trøndelag
- Coordinates: 63°39′59″N 10°29′29″E
- Country: Norway
- County: Nord-Trøndelag
- District: Fosen
- Established: 1 Jan 1838
  - Created as: Formannskapsdistrikt
- Disestablished: 31 Dec 2017
  - Succeeded by: Indre Fosen Municipality
- Administrative centre: Leksvik

Government
  - Mayor (2015–2017): Steinar Saghaug (H)

Area (upon dissolution)
  - Total: 430.22 km^{2} (166.11 sq mi)
  - Land: 399.70 km^{2} (154.33 sq mi)
  - Water: 30.52 km^{2} (11.78 sq mi) 7.1%
  - Rank: #230 in Norway
- Highest elevation: 601 m (1,972 ft)

Population (2017)
  - Total: 3,480
  - Rank: #249 in Norway
  - Density: 8.1/km^{2} (21/sq mi)
  - Change (10 years): ▼ −0.1%
- Demonym: Leksværing

Official language
  - Norwegian form: Neutral
- Time zone: UTC+01:00 (CET)
  - Summer (DST): UTC+02:00 (CEST)
- ISO 3166 code: NO-1718

Leksvik is a former municipality in the old Nord-Trøndelag county, Norway. The municipality existed from 1838 until its dissolution in 2018 when it became part of the newly created Indre Fosen Municipality in Trøndelag county. The administrative center of the municipality was the village of Leksvik. Other villages in Leksvik included Vanvikan, Seter, and Dalbygda. Norwegian County Road 755 is the main road that connected the whole municipality from north to south.

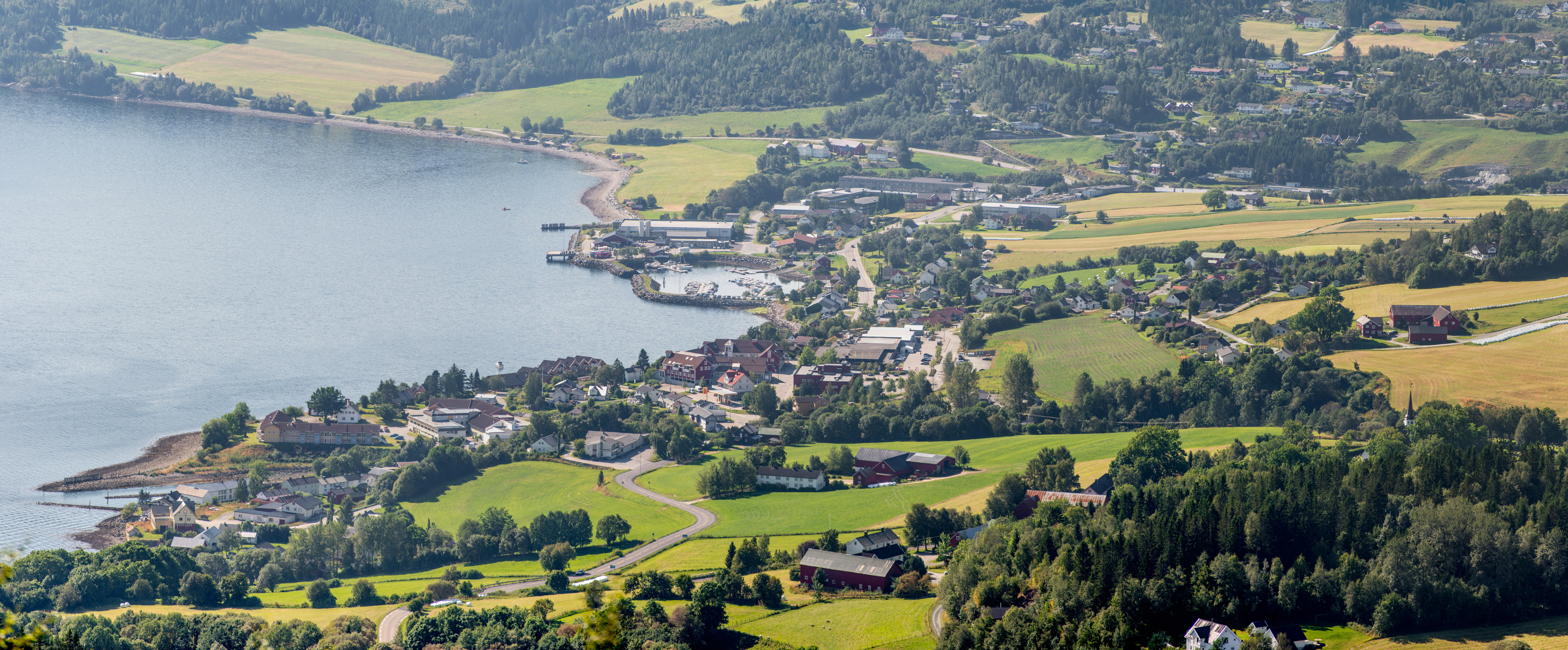
Leksvik as seen from Våttåhaugen. Photo: Christian Nesset

Prior to its dissolution in 2018, the 430-square-kilometre (170 sq mi) municipality was the 230th largest by area out of the then 426 municipalities in Norway. Leksvik Municipality was the 249th most populous municipality in Norway with a population of 3,480. The municipality's population density was 8.7 inhabitants per square kilometre (23/sq mi) and its population had decreased by 0.1% over the last decade.

The villages of Leksvik and Vanvikan were the two largest urban areas in Leksvik, notable for their high tech industries which have developed to become advanced and in demand. Areas with agriculture were also widespread, but most of the municipality was covered in forests and mountains where the wildlife ruled with animals such as moose and reindeer. The moose are sometimes seen in the heart of Leksvik and Vanvikan, where modern downtown areas with commercial and residential developments are growing.

== General information ==
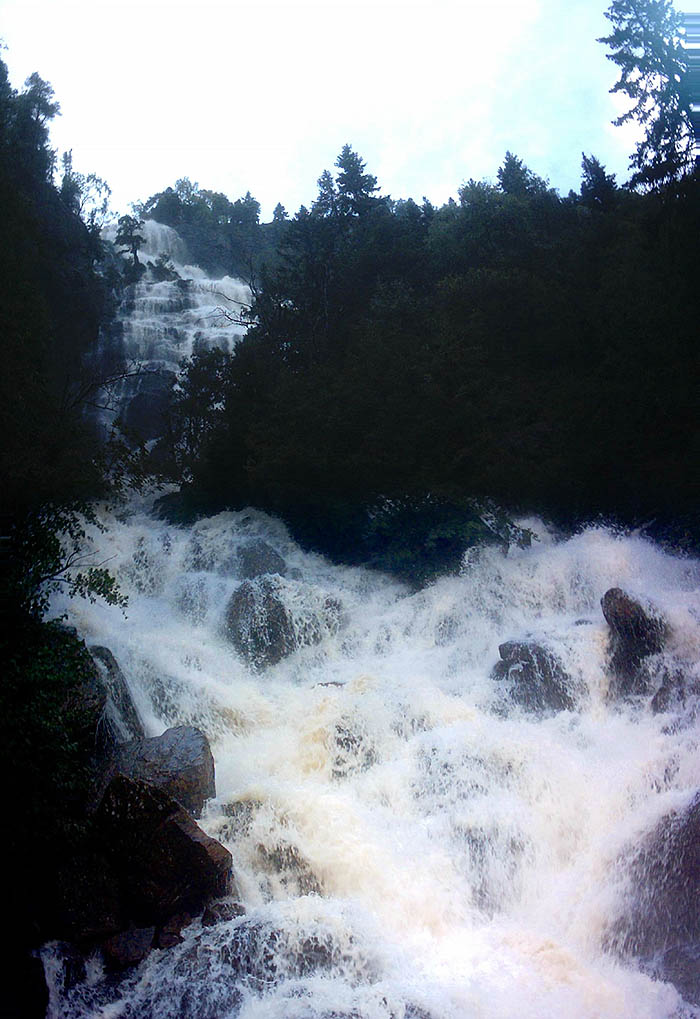
View of the Bjørnåa river and falls

The parish of Leksvik was established as a municipality on 1 January 1838 (see formannskapsdistrikt law). During its entire existence, it was one of the few municipalities in Norway that did not have any changes to its borders.

On 1 January 2018, Leksvik Municipality merged with the neighboring Rissa Municipality to form the newly created Indre Fosen Municipality and at the same time, it became part of the newly merged Trøndelag county.

=== Name ===
The municipality (originally the parish) is named after the old Leksvik farm (Old Norse: Lexuvík) since the first Leksvik Church was built there. The first element is Lexa which is the genitive case of a river name. The name of the river is possibly derived from the word lax which means "salmon". The last element is vík which means "inlet". Historically, the name of the municipality was spelled Leksvigen or Leksviken. On 3 November 1917, a royal resolution changed the spelling of the name of the municipality to Leksvik, removing the definite form ending -en.

=== Coat of arms ===
The coat of arms was granted on 28 September 1990 and they were in use until 1 January 2018 when the municipality was dissolved (the same arms were re-adopted for the new Indre Fosen Municipality after the merger of Leksvik and Rissa Municipality on that date). The official blazon is "Per chevron embowed azure and argent point ending in trefoil" (Norwegian: I blått en innbøyd sølv spiss som ender i et kløverblad). This means the arms have a field (background) that is divided by a line in the shape of a chevron with curved sides that meet at a point. A trefoil is located on top of this point. The background above the line is blue and the background below this line has a tincture of argent which means it is commonly colored white, but if it is made out of metal, then silver is used. The blue part represents the Trondheimsfjord and the white/silver part represents the land, particularly the Amborneset peninsula where King Sverre Sigurdsson fought his last sea battle on 8 June 1198. There is a clover/trefoil design at the end of the silver part which represents life and growth. The arms were designed by Einar H. Skjærvold.

=== Churches ===
The Church of Norway had one parish (sokn) within Leksvik Municipality. It was part of the Fosen prosti (deanery) in the Diocese of Nidaros.

Churches in Leksvik Municipality
| Parish (sokn) | Church name | Location of the church | Year built |
|---|---|---|---|
| Leksvik | Leksvik Church | Leksvik | 1670 |
| Stranda | Stranda Church | Vanvikan | 1897 |

== Geography ==
Leksvik Municipality was located on the eastern side of the Fosen peninsula along the coast of Trondheimsfjorden. There were two large lakes located in Leksvik: Storvatnet and Meltingvatnet. The highest point in the municipality was the 601-metre (1,972 ft) tall mountain Kjerringklumpen.

== Government ==
While it existed, Leksvik Municipality was responsible for primary education (through 10th grade), outpatient health services, senior citizen services, welfare and other social services, zoning, economic development, and municipal roads and utilities. The municipality was governed by a municipal council of directly elected representatives. The mayor was indirectly elected by a vote of the municipal council. The municipality was under the jurisdiction of the Frostating Court of Appeal.

=== Municipal council ===
The municipal council (Kommunestyre) of Leksvik Municipality was made up of 25 representatives that were elected to four year terms. The tables below show the historical composition of the council by political party.

Leksvik kommunestyre 2015–2017
| Party name (in Norwegian) | Number of representatives |
|---|---|
| Labour Party (Arbeiderpartiet) | 10 |
| Progress Party (Fremskrittspartiet) | 2 |
| Conservative Party (Høyre) | 5 |
| Christian Democratic Party (Kristelig Folkeparti) | 1 |
| Centre Party (Senterpartiet) | 5 |
| Socialist Left Party (Sosialistisk Venstreparti) | 1 |
| Liberal Party (Venstre) | 1 |
| Total number of members: | 25 |
Note: On 1 January 2018, Leksvik Municipality became part of Indre Fosen Municipality.

Leksvik kommunestyre 2011–2015
| Party name (in Norwegian) | Number of representatives |
|---|---|
| Labour Party (Arbeiderpartiet) | 7 |
| Progress Party (Fremskrittspartiet) | 3 |
| Conservative Party (Høyre) | 5 |
| Christian Democratic Party (Kristelig Folkeparti) | 2 |
| Centre Party (Senterpartiet) | 6 |
| Socialist Left Party (Sosialistisk Venstreparti) | 1 |
| Liberal Party (Venstre) | 1 |
| Total number of members: | 25 |

Leksvik kommunestyre 2007–2011
| Party name (in Norwegian) | Number of representatives |
|---|---|
| Labour Party (Arbeiderpartiet) | 8 |
| Progress Party (Fremskrittspartiet) | 4 |
| Conservative Party (Høyre) | 3 |
| Christian Democratic Party (Kristelig Folkeparti) | 2 |
| Centre Party (Senterpartiet) | 6 |
| Socialist Left Party (Sosialistisk Venstreparti) | 1 |
| Liberal Party (Venstre) | 1 |
| Total number of members: | 25 |

Leksvik kommunestyre 2003–2007
| Party name (in Norwegian) | Number of representatives |
|---|---|
| Labour Party (Arbeiderpartiet) | 8 |
| Progress Party (Fremskrittspartiet) | 3 |
| Conservative Party (Høyre) | 3 |
| Christian Democratic Party (Kristelig Folkeparti) | 1 |
| Centre Party (Senterpartiet) | 7 |
| Socialist Left Party (Sosialistisk Venstreparti) | 2 |
| Liberal Party (Venstre) | 1 |
| Total number of members: | 25 |

Leksvik kommunestyre 1999–2003
| Party name (in Norwegian) | Number of representatives |
|---|---|
| Labour Party (Arbeiderpartiet) | 8 |
| Conservative Party (Høyre) | 5 |
| Christian Democratic Party (Kristelig Folkeparti) | 2 |
| Centre Party (Senterpartiet) | 8 |
| Socialist Left Party (Sosialistisk Venstreparti) | 1 |
| Liberal Party (Venstre) | 1 |
| Total number of members: | 25 |

Leksvik kommunestyre 1995–1999
| Party name (in Norwegian) | Number of representatives |
|---|---|
| Labour Party (Arbeiderpartiet) | 7 |
| Conservative Party (Høyre) | 3 |
| Christian Democratic Party (Kristelig Folkeparti) | 2 |
| Centre Party (Senterpartiet) | 11 |
| Socialist Left Party (Sosialistisk Venstreparti) | 1 |
| Liberal Party (Venstre) | 1 |
| Total number of members: | 25 |

Leksvik kommunestyre 1991–1995
| Party name (in Norwegian) | Number of representatives |
|---|---|
| Labour Party (Arbeiderpartiet) | 7 |
| Conservative Party (Høyre) | 3 |
| Christian Democratic Party (Kristelig Folkeparti) | 2 |
| Centre Party (Senterpartiet) | 10 |
| Socialist Left Party (Sosialistisk Venstreparti) | 1 |
| Liberal Party (Venstre) | 2 |
| Total number of members: | 25 |

Leksvik kommunestyre 1987–1991
| Party name (in Norwegian) | Number of representatives |
|---|---|
| Labour Party (Arbeiderpartiet) | 10 |
| Conservative Party (Høyre) | 3 |
| Christian Democratic Party (Kristelig Folkeparti) | 2 |
| Centre Party (Senterpartiet) | 8 |
| Socialist Left Party (Sosialistisk Venstreparti) | 1 |
| Liberal Party (Venstre) | 1 |
| Total number of members: | 25 |

Leksvik kommunestyre 1983–1987
| Party name (in Norwegian) | Number of representatives |
|---|---|
| Labour Party (Arbeiderpartiet) | 10 |
| Conservative Party (Høyre) | 3 |
| Christian Democratic Party (Kristelig Folkeparti) | 2 |
| Centre Party (Senterpartiet) | 8 |
| Liberal Party (Venstre) | 2 |
| Total number of members: | 25 |

Leksvik kommunestyre 1979–1983
| Party name (in Norwegian) | Number of representatives |
|---|---|
| Labour Party (Arbeiderpartiet) | 8 |
| Conservative Party (Høyre) | 3 |
| Christian Democratic Party (Kristelig Folkeparti) | 3 |
| Centre Party (Senterpartiet) | 9 |
| Liberal Party (Venstre) | 2 |
| Total number of members: | 25 |

Leksvik kommunestyre 1975–1979
| Party name (in Norwegian) | Number of representatives |
|---|---|
| Labour Party (Arbeiderpartiet) | 7 |
| Conservative Party (Høyre) | 1 |
| Christian Democratic Party (Kristelig Folkeparti) | 3 |
| Centre Party (Senterpartiet) | 10 |
| Free Voters List (Frie Velgeres Liste) | 4 |
| Total number of members: | 25 |

Leksvik kommunestyre 1971–1975
| Party name (in Norwegian) | Number of representatives |
|---|---|
| Labour Party (Arbeiderpartiet) | 7 |
| Conservative Party (Høyre) | 1 |
| Christian Democratic Party (Kristelig Folkeparti) | 3 |
| Centre Party (Senterpartiet) | 9 |
| Liberal Party (Venstre) | 1 |
| Total number of members: | 21 |

Leksvik kommunestyre 1967–1971
| Party name (in Norwegian) | Number of representatives |
|---|---|
| Labour Party (Arbeiderpartiet) | 6 |
| Conservative Party (Høyre) | 2 |
| Christian Democratic Party (Kristelig Folkeparti) | 3 |
| Centre Party (Senterpartiet) | 7 |
| Local List(s) (Lokale lister) | 3 |
| Total number of members: | 21 |

Leksvik kommunestyre 1963–1967
| Party name (in Norwegian) | Number of representatives |
|---|---|
| Labour Party (Arbeiderpartiet) | 7 |
| Joint List(s) of Non-Socialist Parties (Borgerlige Felleslister) | 5 |
| Local List(s) (Lokale lister) | 9 |
| Total number of members: | 21 |

Leksvik herredsstyre 1959–1963
| Party name (in Norwegian) | Number of representatives |
|---|---|
| Labour Party (Arbeiderpartiet) | 5 |
| Centre Party (Senterpartiet) | 1 |
| Joint List(s) of Non-Socialist Parties (Borgerlige Felleslister) | 7 |
| Local List(s) (Lokale lister) | 8 |
| Total number of members: | 21 |

Leksvik herredsstyre 1955–1959
| Party name (in Norwegian) | Number of representatives |
|---|---|
| Labour Party (Arbeiderpartiet) | 4 |
| Joint List(s) of Non-Socialist Parties (Borgerlige Felleslister) | 13 |
| Local List(s) (Lokale lister) | 4 |
| Total number of members: | 21 |

Leksvik herredsstyre 1951–1955
| Party name (in Norwegian) | Number of representatives |
|---|---|
| Labour Party (Arbeiderpartiet) | 5 |
| Local List(s) (Lokale lister) | 15 |
| Total number of members: | 20 |

Leksvik herredsstyre 1947–1951
| Party name (in Norwegian) | Number of representatives |
|---|---|
| Labour Party (Arbeiderpartiet) | 3 |
| Local List(s) (Lokale lister) | 17 |
| Total number of members: | 20 |

Leksvik herredsstyre 1945–1947
| Party name (in Norwegian) | Number of representatives |
|---|---|
| Labour Party (Arbeiderpartiet) | 3 |
| List of workers, fishermen, and small farmholders (Arbeidere, fiskere, småbrukere liste) | 1 |
| Local List(s) (Lokale lister) | 16 |
| Total number of members: | 20 |

Leksvik herredsstyre 1937–1941*
| Party name (in Norwegian) | Number of representatives |
|---|---|
| Labour Party (Arbeiderpartiet) | 3 |
| Joint List(s) of Non-Socialist Parties (Borgerlige Felleslister) | 5 |
| Local List(s) (Lokale lister) | 12 |
| Total number of members: | 20 |
Note: Due to the German occupation of Norway during World War II, no elections were held for new municipal councils until after the war ended in 1945.

=== Mayors ===
The mayor (Norwegian: ordfører) of Leksvik Municipality was the political leader of the municipality and the chairperson of the municipal council. Here is a list of people who held this position:

- 1838–1840: Johan Albricht Carl Dons
- 1840–1841: Nils Hjellup
- 1842–1845: Christopher Winther Scheen
- 1845–1846: Ole H. Krabseth
- 1846–1849: Petter A. Grande
- 1850–1857: Ole J. Moholdt
- 1858–1859: Ole Aalberg
- 1860–1863: Hans Bull Motzfeldt
- 1864–1865: Ole J. Moholdt
- 1866–1869: Ole Aalberg
- 1870–1871: Aage Casper Larsen Winge
- 1872–1883: Hans Bull Motzfeldt (H)
- 1884–1888: Carl Ludvig Møller (H)
- 1888–1893: Ole Moxnes (V)
- 1894–1895: Hans Strand (H)
- 1896–1897: Ole Moxnes (V)
- 1898–1916: Hans Strand (H)
- 1917–1922: Karl Myran (Av)
- 1923–1925: Arnt Bye
- 1926–1937: Edvard Grande (V)
- 1938–1941: P.A. Rosvold (H)
- 1941–1945: Hartvig Dalsaune
- 1945–1947: P.A. Rosvold (H)
- 1948–1949: Ole Graven (V)
- 1950–1951: Ole Hindrum (Bp)
- 1952–1960: Elias Grande (V)
- 1961–1963: Johan Hindrum (Sp)
- 1964–1967: Hans Kirkhus (V)
- 1968–1979: Ingvar Sæther (Sp)
- 1980–1983: Olav Moholdt (KrF)
- 1984–1985: Ingvar Sæther (Sp)
- 1986–1995: Ingebjørg Karmhus (Sp)
- 1995–2003: Einar Strøm (Sp)
- 2003–2007: Borghild Husdal Buhaug (Sp)
- 2007–2015: Einar Strøm (Sp)
- 2015–2017: Steinar Saghaug (H)

== History ==
The first inhabitants are believed to have moved to Leksvik some 3,000 years ago. They left several pieces of cutting tools which are now placed in museums. But Leksvik does not appear in recorded history before the Viking Age when the villages Leksvik and Hindrem became quite important in the local area. In both Leksvik and Hindrem there have been found great tombs and ruins of buildings and longboats. On Borgen, there is a hill between Hindrem and Seter that may have been a great Viking fortress, but this could also be tracks made by the glaciers during the last ice age. After the Black Death struck Norway in 1349, Leksvik fell into silence for some 300 years.

In more modern history, Leksvik and Hindrem are small and relatively isolated villages, north of Trondheim Fjord. Two churches stood here, Leksvik Church and a stave church in Hindrem, but this broke down in 1655 and was replaced by a modern wooden church. In the 19th century, the church of Hindrem was demolished, and the new Stranda Church was built in Vanvikan. Leksvik became well known for its goats and had 5,000 of them at their peak number.

During World War II, Leksvik was settled by German troops with the main camp on the top of Våttåhaugen, a hill north of the village of Leksvik. But as a small and isolated village, nothing of great importance happened there during the war, and it was mostly peaceful although bombs fell over Trondheim, on the south side of the fjord. After electric power first came to Leksvik, Bjørn Lyng founded the first industry in Vanvikan and Leksvik. After the first road was finally finished in the early 1960s, industry grew rapidly and replaced the goats.
