= Vera Church =

Church in Trøndelag, Norway

- Vera kirke
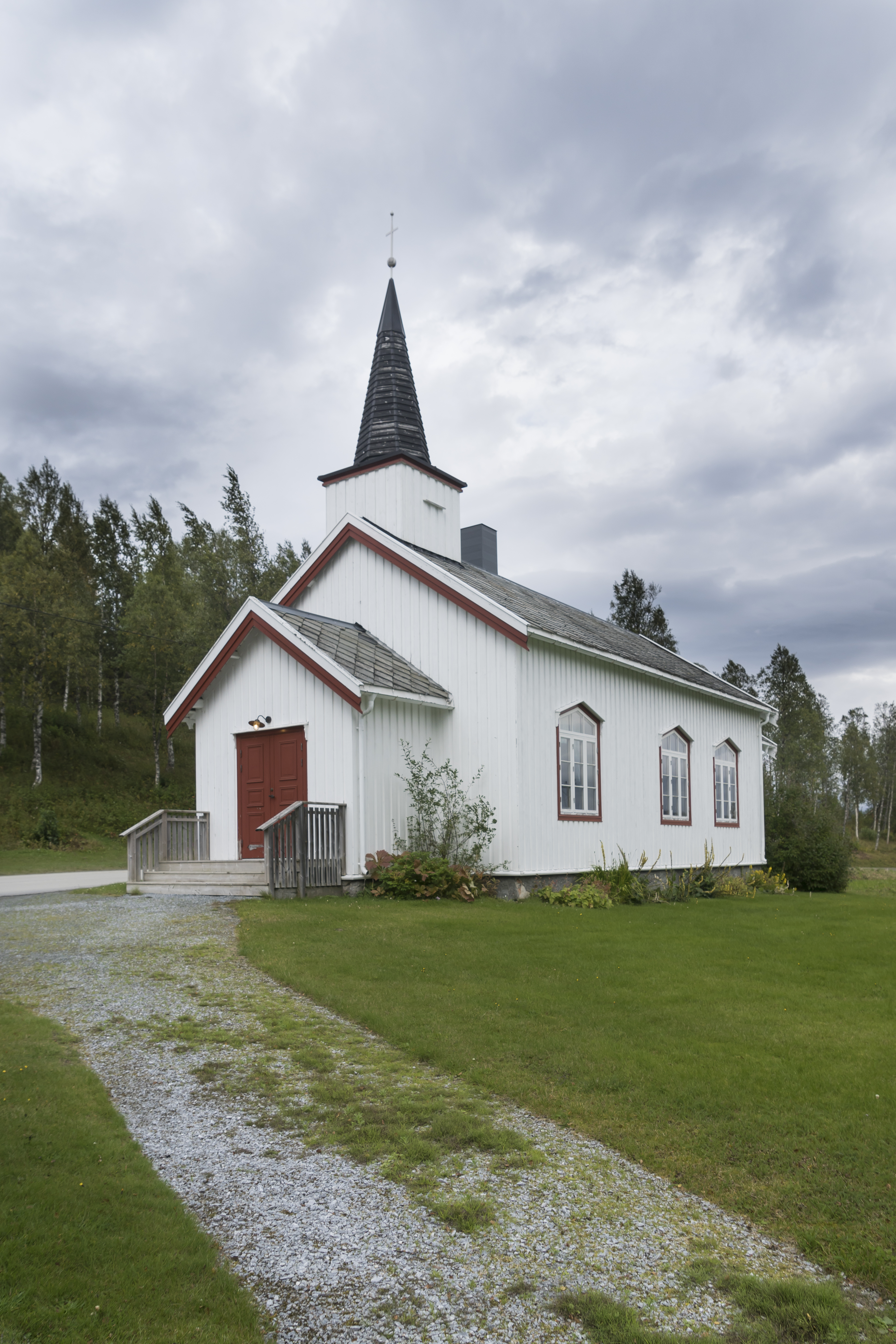
- View of the church
- Vera Church
- 63.80138966°N 12.34939724°E
- Location: Verdal Municipality, Trøndelag
- Country: Norway
- Denomination: Church of Norway
- Churchmanship: Evangelical Lutheran

History
- Former name: Vera kapell
- Status: Parish church
- Founded: 1889
- Consecrated: 16 Aug 1899

Architecture
- Functional status: Active
- Architectural type: Long church
- Completed: 1899 (127 years ago)

Specifications
- Capacity: 75
- Materials: Wood

Administration
- Diocese: Nidaros bispedømme
- Deanery: Stiklestad prosti
- Parish: Vera og Vuku
- Norwegian Cultural Heritage Site
- Type: Church
- Status: Listed
- ID: 85805

Vera Church (Norwegian: Vera kirke) is a parish church of the Church of Norway in Verdal Municipality in Trøndelag county, Norway. It is located in the village of Vera. It is one of the churches for the Vera og Vuku parish which is part of the Stiklestad prosti (deanery) in the Diocese of Nidaros. The white, wooden church was built in a long church style in 1899 using plans drawn up by an unknown architect. The church seats about 75 people.

== History ==
Vera is a remote mountain village in Verdal that has traditionally been part of the Vuku Church parish. The village, however, was located about 40 kilometres (25 mi) from the Vuku Church, meaning this was historically a very long journey to the church. The village was given a burial ground (auxiliary cemetery) in 1879 so that bodies did not have to be transported such a great distance. The population in the village continued to increase towards the end of the 19th century, and an application was made to build a church building in the village that could also be used as a school building. The municipality rejected the application in the first instance, but the case was taken up again in the 1890s and was eventually approved. For a while there has been talk of building a two-story building with a floor for a school and the church on the other floor. This plan was scrapped and they ended up building a traditional church design were the nave was used for school lessons during the week and a gate that could close off the choir from the nave during school. The builder at the construction was Ole Andersen Hjelte. Vera Chapel was consecrated by the bishop on 16 August 1899. In 1998, the school was closed and the chapel was upgraded to being a full parish church (the second church for the parish).

== See also ==
- List of churches in Nidaros
