= Vuku Church =

Church in Trøndelag, Norway

- Vuku kirke
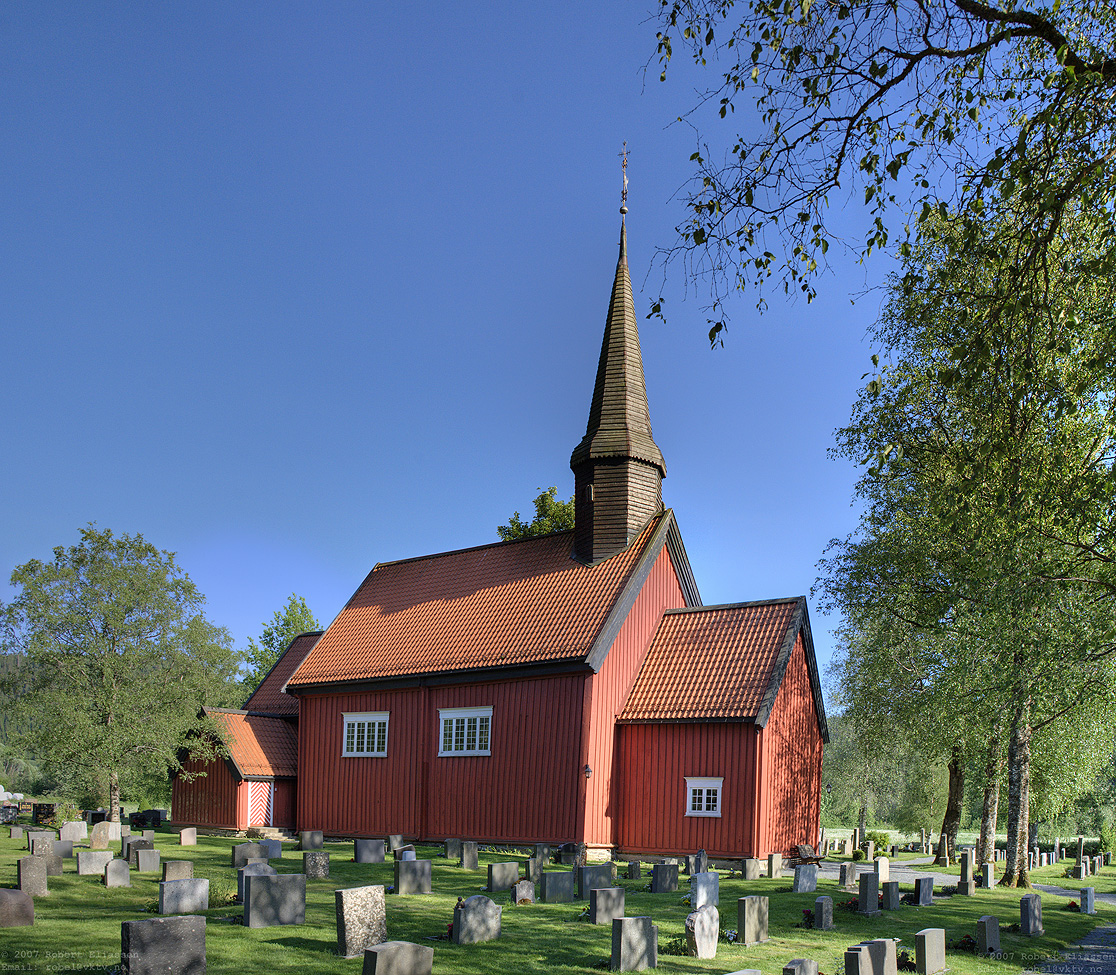
- View of the church
- Vuku Church
- 63.77376111°N 11.75040498°E
- Location: Verdal Municipality, Trøndelag
- Country: Norway
- Denomination: Church of Norway
- Churchmanship: Evangelical Lutheran

History
- Status: Parish church
- Founded: 14th century
- Consecrated: 6 Feb 1655

Architecture
- Functional status: Active
- Architect: Ole Jonsen Hindrum
- Architectural type: Long church
- Completed: 1654 (372 years ago)

Specifications
- Capacity: 200
- Materials: Wood

Administration
- Diocese: Nidaros bispedømme
- Deanery: Stiklestad prosti
- Parish: Vera og Vuku
- Norwegian Cultural Heritage Site
- Type: Church
- Status: Automatically protected
- ID: 85871

Vuku Church (Norwegian: Vuku kirke) is a parish church of the Church of Norway in Verdal Municipality in Trøndelag county, Norway. It is located in the village of Vuku. It is one of the churches for the Vera og Vuku parish which is part of the Stiklestad prosti (deanery) in the Diocese of Nidaros. The red, wooden church was built in a long church style in 1654 using plans drawn up by the architect Ole Jonsen Hindrum. The church seats about 200 people.

== History ==
The earliest existing historical records of the church date back to 1533, but the church was not new that year. The first church at Vuku was likely a wooden stave church that was possibly built in the 14th century. The old church had a nave with a rectangular floor plan and a smaller, narrower and straight-ended choir on the east end. On the west end it had an entry porch with a bell tower above it.

By the mid-1600s, the old church was in very poor condition and it was decided to tear down the old church and to build a new one on the same site. The new church was completed in 1654 and it was formally consecrated on 6 February 1655. The new church is a wooden long church that was designed by Ole Jonsen Hindrum. The church has a tower on the roof of the nave and a sacristy on the north side of the choir. In 1673, the entry porch and the sacristy were taken down and rebuilt. In 1677, a second floor seating gallery was installed. In 1683, a new baptismal room was built. In 1812, the entry porch on the west end of the building was rebuilt again. The night between 19 and 20 November 1844, lightning struck the tower and caused a fire in the church. The tower and the entry porch were damaged, but the rest of the church was saved thanks to a heavy rain that put out the fire. After discussions and planning, the church was extensively renovated and repaired. It was given a new tower on the roof of the nave. Much of the interior was changed on that occasion. In 1904, a new entrance was added to the south wall of the nave. For the 300th anniversary in 1955, the church was renovated and partially restored to its former appearance according to plans by John Tverdahl and Ola Seter.

== Media gallery ==
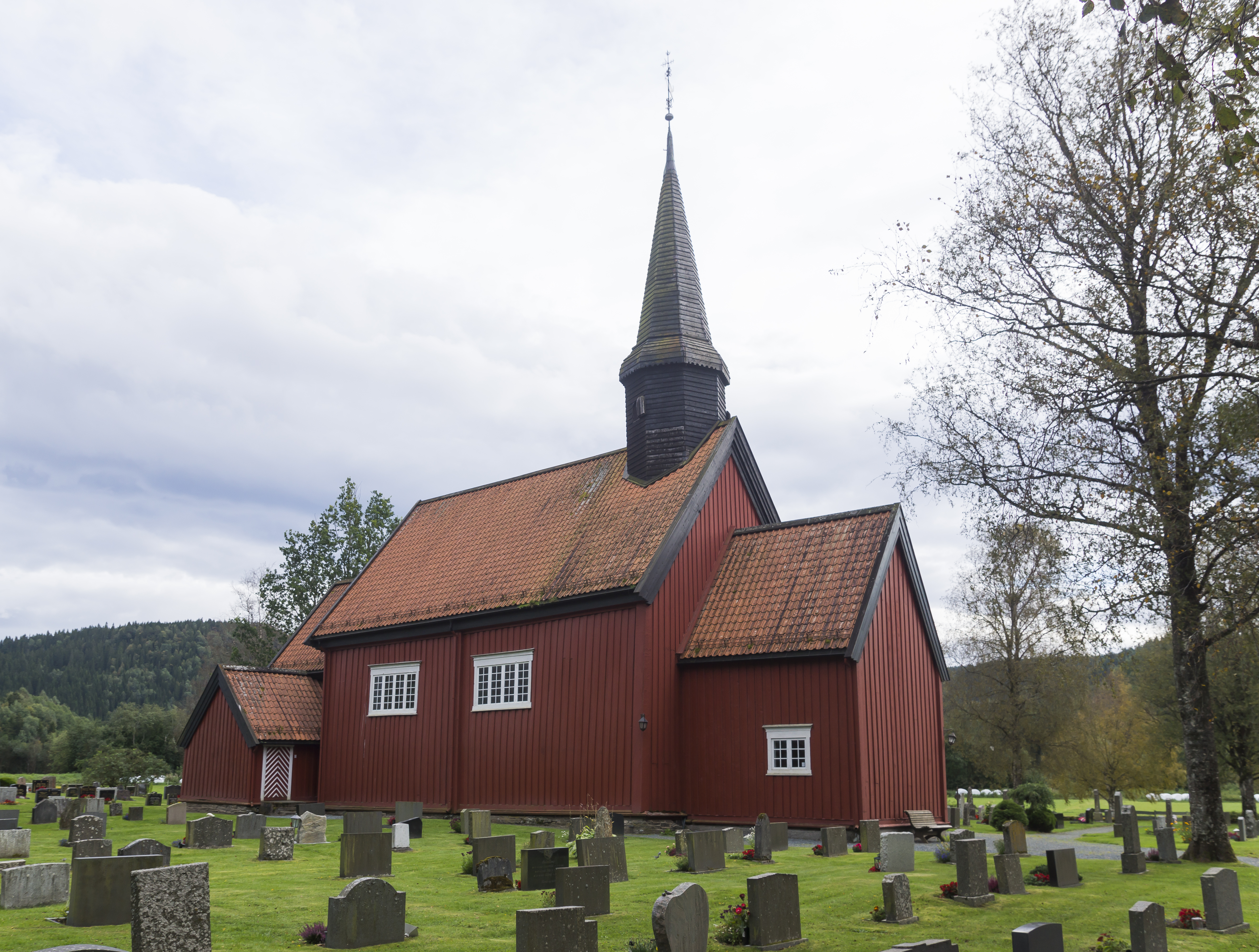

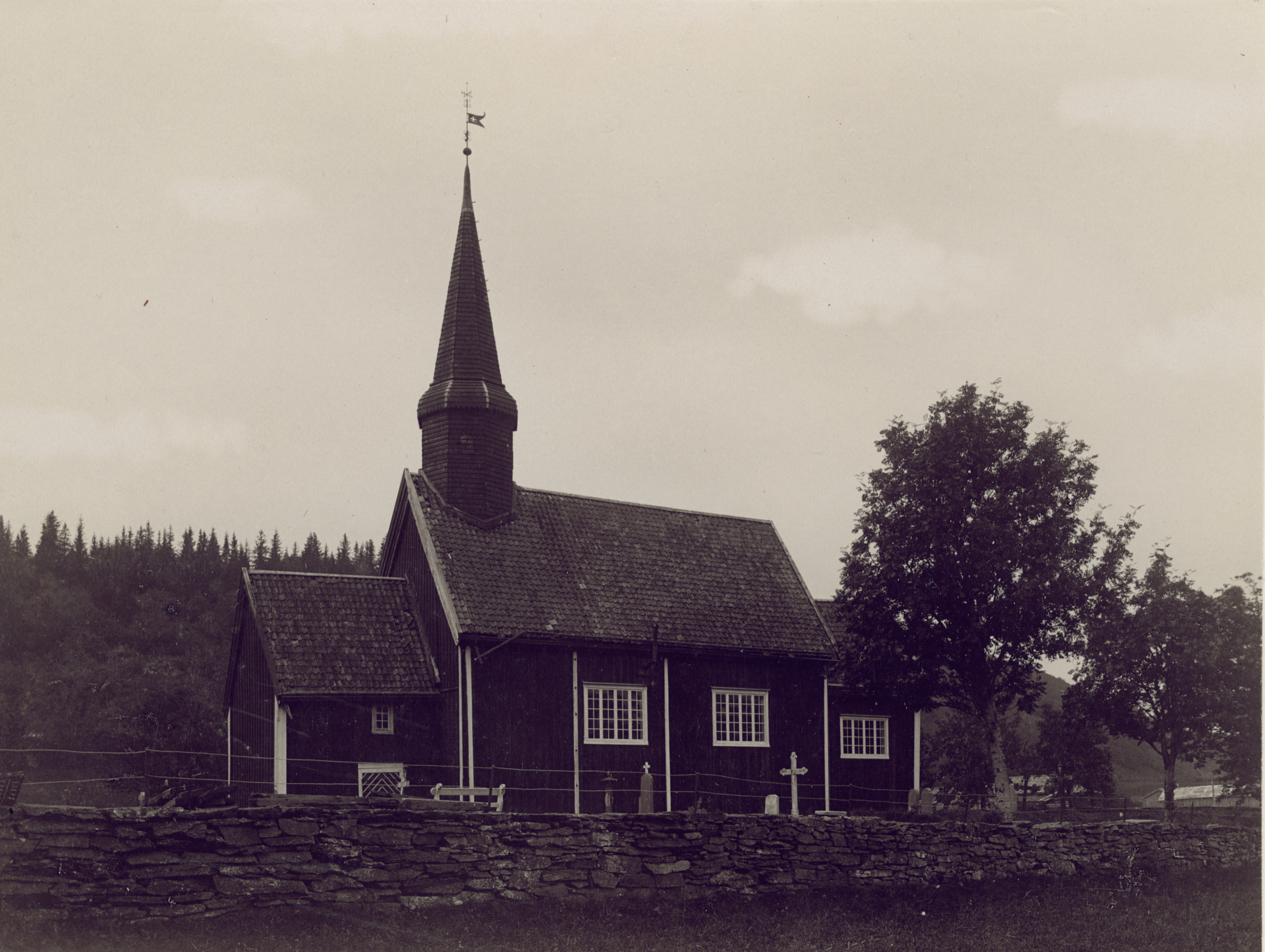

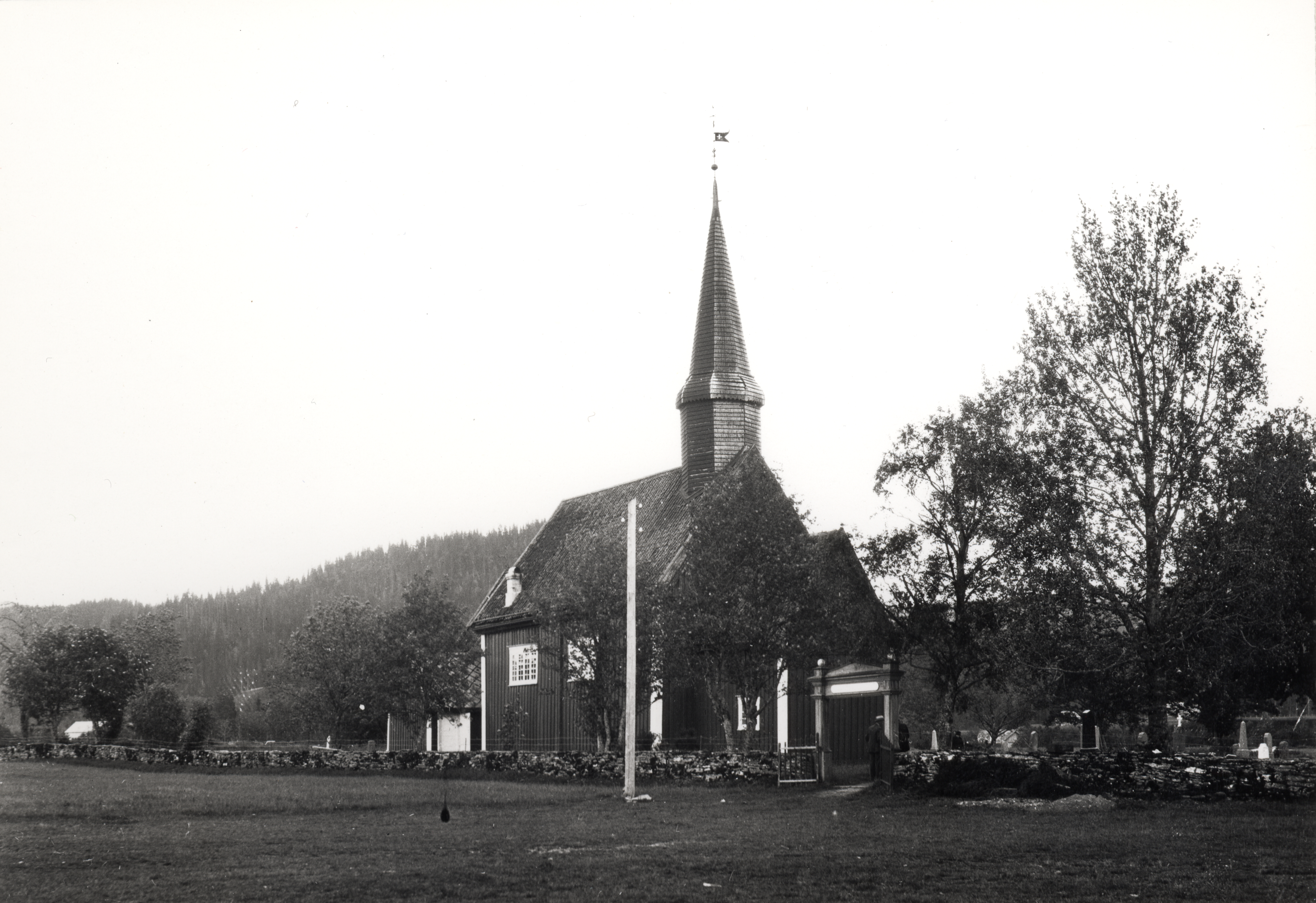

== See also ==
- List of churches in Nidaros
