= Vera, Norway =

Village in Verdal Municipality, Norway

Vera Nord-Vera
- Village
- Interactive map of Vera
- Location within Trøndelag Location within Norway
- Coordinates: 63.8013°N 12.3472°E
- Country: Norway
- Region: Central Norway
- County: Trøndelag
- District: Innherred
- Municipality: Verdal Municipality
- Elevation: 367 m (1,204 ft)
- Time zone: UTC+01:00 (CET)
  - Summer (DST): UTC+02:00 (CEST)
- Post Code: 7660 Vuku

Vera is a village in Verdal Municipality in Trøndelag county, Norway. It is located on the northern shore of the lake Veresvatnet, about 4 kilometres (2.5 mi) west of the border with Sweden, about 2 kilometres (1.2 mi) south of the edge of Blåfjella–Skjækerfjella National Park, and about 40 kilometres (25 mi) east of the village of Vuku.

The main part of the village lies on the north shore of the little lake, but the settlement stretches along the whole north and eastern shores of the lake.

Vera is also a Church of Norway parish covering the eastern part of Verdal Municipality, with Vera Chapel located in this village.
