= Leksvik Church =

Church in Trøndelag, Norway

- Leksvik kirke
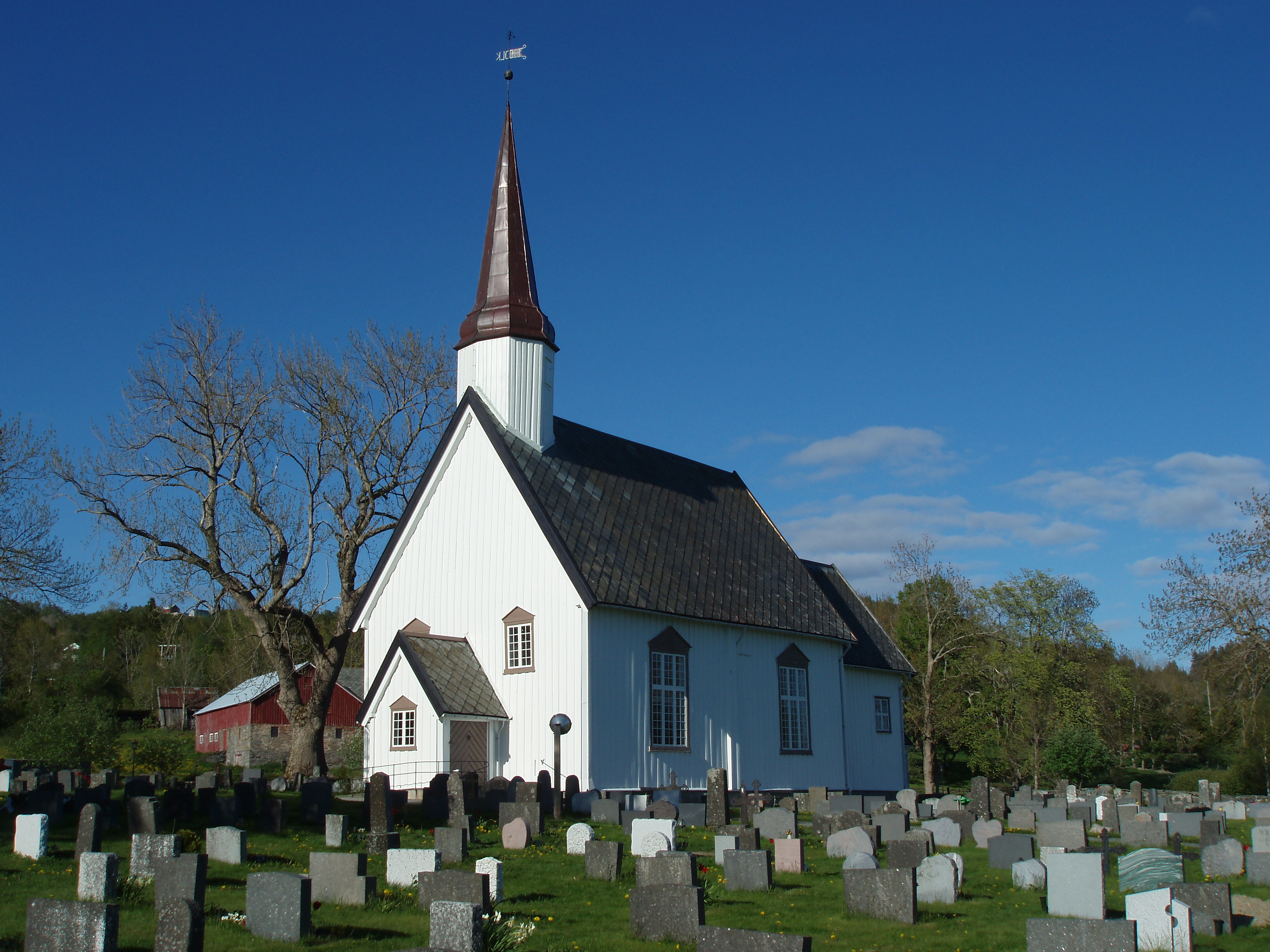
- View of the church
- Leksvik Church
- 63.67813679°N 10.632354319°E
- Location: Indre Fosen, Trøndelag
- Country: Norway
- Denomination: Church of Norway
- Churchmanship: Evangelical Lutheran

History
- Status: Parish church
- Founded: 12th century
- Consecrated: c. 1668

Architecture
- Functional status: Active
- Architect(s): Ole Jonsen Hindrum and Nils Olufsen
- Architectural type: Long church
- Completed: c. 1668 (358 years ago)

Specifications
- Materials: Wood

Administration
- Diocese: Nidaros bispedømme
- Deanery: Fosen prosti
- Parish: Leksvik
- Norwegian Cultural Heritage Site
- Type: Church
- Status: Automatically protected
- ID: 84286

Leksvik Church (Norwegian: Leksvik kirke) is a parish church of the Church of Norway in Indre Fosen Municipality in Trøndelag county, Norway. It is located in the village of Leksvik. It is the church for the Leksvik parish which is part of the Fosen prosti (deanery) in the Diocese of Nidaros. The white, wooden church was built in a long church style in 1668 using plans drawn up by the architects Ole Jonsen Hindrum and Nils Olufsen. The church seats about 300 people.

== History ==
The earliest existing historical records of the church date back to the year 1533, but the church was likely built during the 12th century. The church was built on the Røstad farm in Leksvik, so historically it was known as Røstad Church. The original church was about 12 by 5 metres (39 ft × 16 ft) with a 3-by-5-metre (9.8 ft × 16.4 ft) choir. Around 1648, the church received a new roof and tower. Soon after in 1652-1654 a newly constructed choir and sacristy was built on the north side of the old building. In 1667, most of the church was torn down except for the relatively new choir and sacristy and a new timber-framed nave was built on the same site. At the same time, the choir roof was raised several meters higher. Therefore by 1670, the entire building had been rebuilt step by step and no more of the medieval church structure remained.

In 1814, this church served as an election church (Norwegian: valgkirke). Together with more than 300 other parish churches across Norway, it was a polling station for elections to the 1814 Norwegian Constituent Assembly which wrote the Constitution of Norway. This was Norway's first national elections. Each church parish was a constituency that elected people called "electors" who later met together in each county to elect the representatives for the assembly that was to meet at Eidsvoll Manor later that year.

During the reconstruction in the 1860s the church lost much of its older interior furniture, but during later reconstruction efforts in the 1950s and 1960s, much of the 17th century furniture was returned. Today the church has new seating, installed in the mid-1990s. The church also contains a very rare crucifix from the Middle Ages, and the sword of Anders Solli. Legend has it that he used the sword to defend himself from the wolves that attacked and killed him in the woods around Leksvik in 1612.

== Priests ==
The following people have been priests of Leksvik Church:

- 1621-1648: Oluf Eriksen
- 1648-1957: Isak Johansen
- 1657-1671: Iver Olufsen
- 1672-1697: Søren Kristoffersen Røg
- 1697-1704: Peder Simonsen Hoff
- 1704-1716: Petter Surland
- 1716-1731: Andreas Nilsen Aalborg
- 1731-1737: Hans Pedersen Europpidan
- 1738-1749: Jens Danielsen Hveding
- 1748-1757: Andreas Berhoft
- 1757-1777: Hans Thode
- 1777-1781: Ferdinand Ulrik Fredrik Treu
- 1781-1784: Hans Thode
- 1784-1792: Morten Jelstrup
- 1792-1811: Hans Christopher Lund
- 1812-1820: Carl Reinholdt Schønheyder
- 1819-1824: Holger Halling Schjødt
- 1824-1832: Christian Bernstorff Bødtker
- 1833-1842: Johan Albricht Carl Dons
- 1843-1852: Christoffer Winther Scheen
- 1852-1864: Niels Andreas Bjørn
- 1864-1877: Bertel Langballe Hartmann
- 1877-1888: Carl Ludvig Møller
- 1888-1914: Lars Johansen Wormdahl
- 1915-1918: Olaf Eeg Svendsen
- 1918-1924: Peder Andersen Toft
- 1924-1932: Theodor Hesselberg
- 1933-1940: Lars Tangvik
- 1941-1952: Johan B. Rian
- 1952-1960: Ingvald Georg Osnes
- 1960-1968: Martin Andersen
- 1969-1977: Hugo Bruun Torbergsen
- 1977-1983: Atle Hopland
- 1983-1992: Roald Drønen
- 1993-2000: Birgitte Bentzrød
- 2000-2007: Gro Lingjærde
- 2008-2020: Verena Grønning
- 2021-present: Cato Engebretsen

== See also ==
- List of churches in Nidaros
