= Leksvik (village) =

Village in Indre Fosen Municipality, Norway

Leksvik Leksvika
- Village
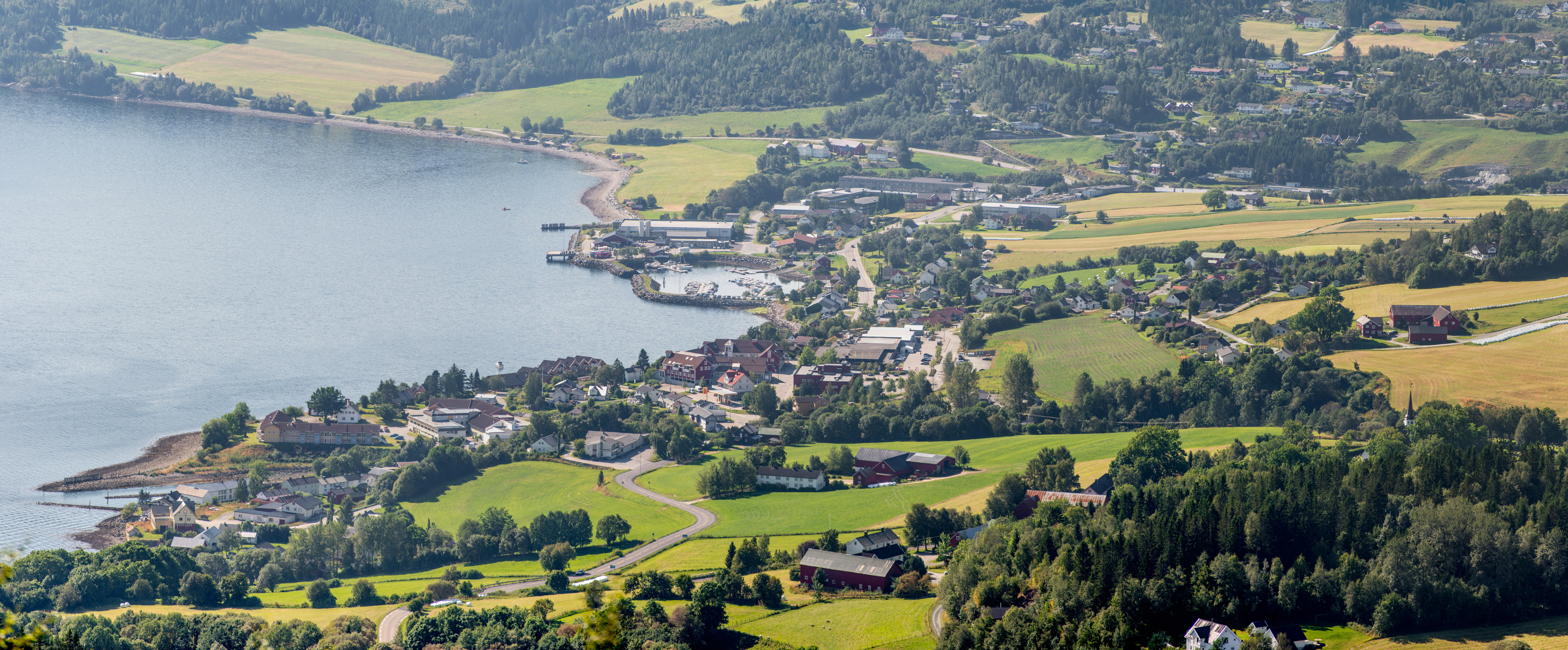
- View of the village
- Interactive map of Leksvik
- Location within Trøndelag Location within Norway
- Coordinates: 63.6727°N 10.6232°E
- Country: Norway
- Region: Central Norway
- County: Trøndelag
- District: Fosen
- Municipality: Indre Fosen

Area
  - Total: 1.42 km^{2} (0.55 sq mi)
- Elevation: 28 m (92 ft)

Population (2024)
  - Total: 1,120
  - Density: 789/km^{2} (2,040/sq mi)
- Time zone: UTC+01:00 (CET)
  - Summer (DST): UTC+02:00 (CEST)
- Post Code: 7120 Leksvik

Leksvik is a village in the Indre Fosen Municipality in Trøndelag county, Norway. The village is located on the western shore of the Trondheimsfjorden at the junction of Norwegian County Road 755 and Norwegian County Road 89.

Leksvik Church is located in the village. The village was the administrative centre of the old Leksvik Municipality which existed from 1838 until its dissolution in 2017 when it became part of Indre Fosen Municipality.

The 1.42-square-kilometre (350-acre) village has a population (2024) of 1,120 and a population density of 789 inhabitants per square kilometre (2,040/sq mi).
