= Nærøy Municipality =

Former municipality in Trøndelag, Norway

Nærøy Municipality Nærøy kommune
- Former municipality
- Nærø herred (historic name)
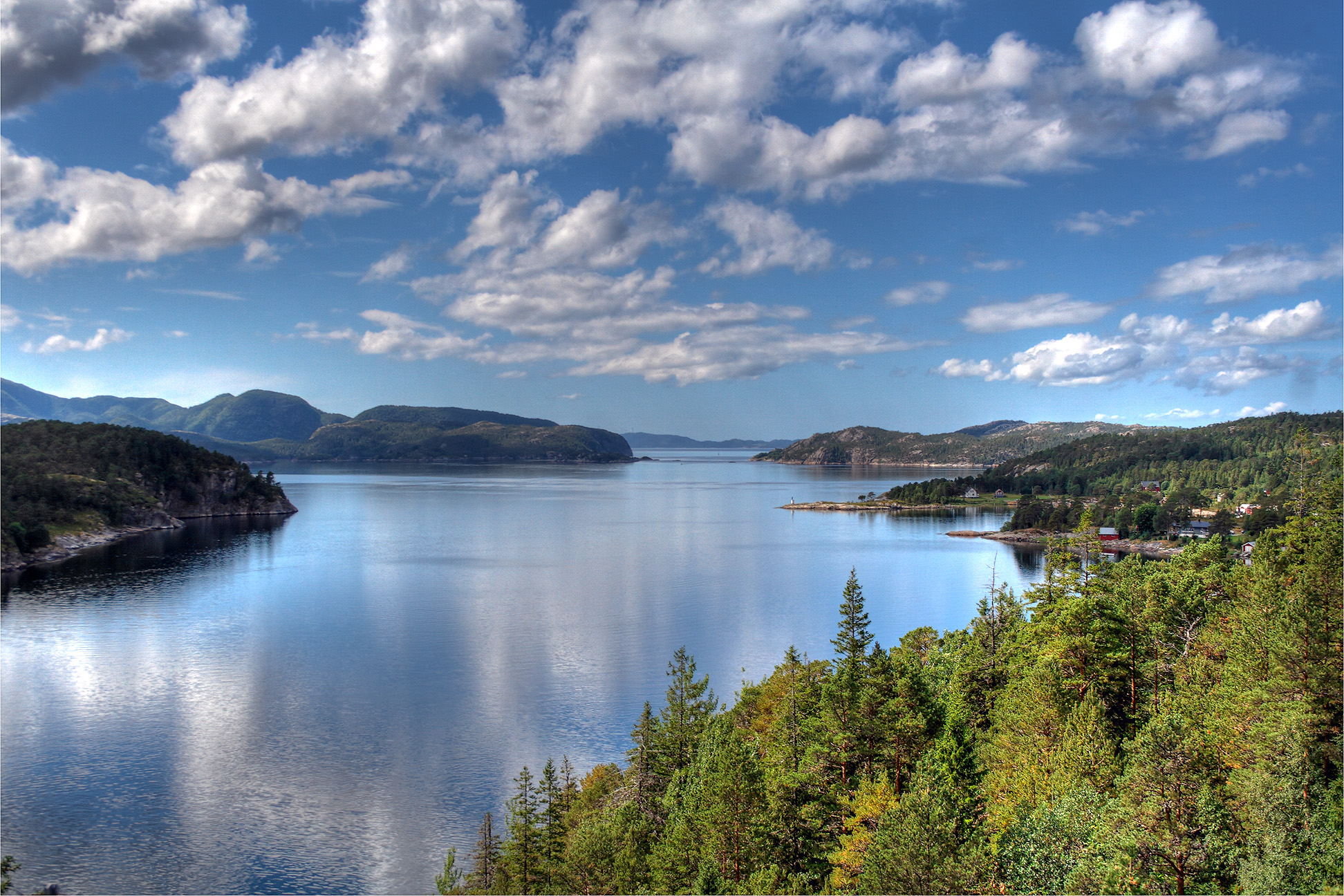
- View of the Opløfjord in Nærøy

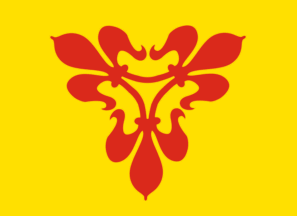
- Flag Coat of arms

- Trøndelag within Norway

- Nærøy within Trøndelag
- Coordinates: 64°56′01″N 11°46′47″E
- Country: Norway
- County: Trøndelag
- District: Namdalen
- Established: 1 Jan 1838
  - Created as: Formannskapsdistrikt
- Disestablished: 1 Jan 2020
  - Succeeded by: Nærøysund Municipality
- Administrative centre: Kolvereid

Government
  - Mayor (1999-2019): Steinar Aspli (Sp)

Area (upon dissolution)
  - Total: 1,067.54 km^{2} (412.18 sq mi)
  - Land: 1,013.89 km^{2} (391.47 sq mi)
  - Water: 53.65 km^{2} (20.71 sq mi) 5%
  - Rank: #96 in Norway
- Highest elevation: 873.58 m (2,866.1 ft)

Population (2019)
  - Total: 5,072
  - Rank: #200 in Norway
  - Density: 4.8/km^{2} (12/sq mi)
  - Change (10 years): ▲ +2%
- Demonym: Nærøyværing

Official language
  - Norwegian form: Bokmål
- Time zone: UTC+01:00 (CET)
  - Summer (DST): UTC+02:00 (CEST)
- ISO 3166 code: NO-5051

Nærøy (Urban East Norwegian: [ˈnæ̂ːrœʏ]) is a former municipality of Trøndelag county, Norway. The municipality existed from 1838 until its dissolution in 2020. It is now part of Nærøysund Municipality in the Namdalen region. Norway's smallest town, Kolvereid, was the administrative centre of the municipality. Some villages in Nærøy Municipality included Abelvær, Foldereid, Gravvika, Lund, Ottersøya, Salsbruket, Steine, and Torstad.

At the time of its dissolution in 2020, the 1,068-square-kilometre (412 sq mi) municipality was the 96th largest by area out of the 422 municipalities in Norway. Nærøy Municipality was the 200th most populous municipality in Norway with a population of 5,072. The municipality's population density was 4.8 inhabitants per square kilometre (12/sq mi) and its population had increased by 2% over the previous decade.

== General information ==
Nærøy was established as a municipality on 1 January 1838 (see formannskapsdistrikt law). On 1 July 1869, the western island district was separated from Nærøy Municipality to become the new Vikten Municipality. This left Nærøy Municipality with 1,477 residents. On 1 January 1902, an unpopulated area of Kolvereid Municipality was transferred to Nærøy Municipality.

During the 1960s, there were many municipal mergers across Norway due to the work of the Schei Committee. On 1 January 1964, a large merger took place. The following areas were merged to form a new, larger Nærøy Municipality:

- all of Nærøy Municipality (population: 2,182)
- all of Gravvik Municipality (population: 816)
- all of Kolvereid Municipality (population: 2,426)
- the western two-thirds of Foldereid Municipality (population: 817)

On 1 January 2018, Nærøy Municipality switched from the old Nord-Trøndelag county to the new Trøndelag county.

On 1 January 2020, most of Nærøy Municipality was merged with the neighboring Vikna Municipality to form the new Nærøysund Municipality. The Lund area in Nærøy Municipality was not part of the merger, however, instead it became part of the newly enlarged Namsos Municipality on the same date.

=== Name ===
The municipality (originally the parish) is named after the island of Nærøya (Old Norse: Njarðøy) since the Old Nærøy Church was built there. The meaning of the first element is uncertain. It is maybe the stem form of the name of the Norse god Njord (but it is suspicious that it is not in the genitive case). The last element is øy which means "island". Historically, the name of the municipality was spelled Nærøen or Nærø. On 3 November 1917, a royal resolution changed the spelling of the name of the municipality to Nærøy.

=== Coat of arms ===
The coat of arms was granted on 22 May 1987 and they were in use until 1 January 2020 when the municipality was dissolved. The official blazon is "Or, three fleur-de-lis in pall stems conjoined gules" (Norwegian: I gull tre røde liljetopper forent i trepass). This means the arms have a field (background) that has a tincture of Or which means it is commonly colored yellow, but if it is made out of metal, then gold is used. The charge is three conjoined fleur-de-lis aligned in a Y-shaped design. The fleur-de-lis design is red to symbolize the local water lilies which generally have a reddish color. The arms are also based on the seal of King Håkon Magnusson from 1344, on a document in which the King granted several rights to the local farmers. The seal shows St. Mary in a portal decorated with fleur-de-lis, the symbol of St. Mary. The arms were designed by Einar H. Skjervold. The municipal flag has the same design as the coat of arms.

=== Churches ===
The Church of Norway had four parishes (sokn) within Nærøy Municipality. It is part of the Namdal prosti (deanery) in the Diocese of Nidaros.

Churches in Nærøy Municipality
Parish (sokn)	Church name	Location of the church	Year built
Foldereid	Foldereid Church	Foldereid	1863
Gravvik	Gravvik Church	Gravvika	1875
Kolvereid	Kolvereid Church	Kolvereid	1874
Kolvereid	Lund Chapel	Lund	1965
Kolvereid	Salsbruket Chapel	Salsbruket	1950
Nærøy	Lundring Church	Lundring	1885
Nærøy	Steine Chapel	Steine	1911
Nærøy	Torstad Chapel	Torstad	1936

== Geography ==
The municipality was located in the northwestern part of Trøndelag county, along the Foldafjord. It included the islands of Austra and Gjerdinga and the Kvingra peninsula. Several large lakes were located in the municipality including Mjosundvatnet, Salvatnet, and Storvatnet. The highest point in the municipality was the 873.58-metre (2,866.1 ft) tall mountain Fuglstadfjellet on the border with Bindal Municipality to the north.

== Government ==
While it existed, Nærøy Municipality was responsible for primary education (through 10th grade), outpatient health services, senior citizen services, welfare and other social services, zoning, economic development, and municipal roads and utilities. The municipality was governed by a municipal council of directly elected representatives. The mayor was indirectly elected by a vote of the municipal council. The municipality was under the jurisdiction of the Namdal District Court and the Frostating Court of Appeal.

Municipal waste management was since 1993 handled by the inter-municipal Midtre Namdal Avfallsselskap.

=== Municipal council ===
The municipal council (Kommunestyre) of Nærøy Municipality was made up of 27 representatives that are elected to four year terms. The tables below show the historical composition of the council by political party.

Nærøy kommunestyre 2015–2019
Party name (in Norwegian)	Number of representatives
Labour Party (Arbeiderpartiet)	9
Progress Party (Fremskrittspartiet)	2
Conservative Party (Høyre)	3
Christian Democratic Party (Kristelig Folkeparti)	1
Centre Party (Senterpartiet)	10
Socialist Left Party (Sosialistisk Venstreparti)	1
Liberal Party (Venstre)	1
Total number of members:	27
Note: On 1 January 2020, Nærøy Municipality became part of Nærøysund Municipality.

Nærøy kommunestyre 2011–2015
Party name (in Norwegian)	Number of representatives
Labour Party (Arbeiderpartiet)	7
Progress Party (Fremskrittspartiet)	3
Conservative Party (Høyre)	2
Christian Democratic Party (Kristelig Folkeparti)	1
Centre Party (Senterpartiet)	10
Socialist Left Party (Sosialistisk Venstreparti)	2
Liberal Party (Venstre)	2
Total number of members:	27

Nærøy kommunestyre 2007–2011
Party name (in Norwegian)	Number of representatives
Labour Party (Arbeiderpartiet)	5
Progress Party (Fremskrittspartiet)	4
Conservative Party (Høyre)	2
Christian Democratic Party (Kristelig Folkeparti)	1
Centre Party (Senterpartiet)	10
Socialist Left Party (Sosialistisk Venstreparti)	4
Liberal Party (Venstre)	1
Total number of members:	27

Nærøy kommunestyre 2003–2007
Party name (in Norwegian)	Number of representatives
Labour Party (Arbeiderpartiet)	8
Progress Party (Fremskrittspartiet)	3
Conservative Party (Høyre)	1
Christian Democratic Party (Kristelig Folkeparti)	1
Centre Party (Senterpartiet)	9
Socialist Left Party (Sosialistisk Venstreparti)	3
Liberal Party (Venstre)	2
Total number of members:	27

Nærøy kommunestyre 1999–2003
Party name (in Norwegian)	Number of representatives
Labour Party (Arbeiderpartiet)	12
Progress Party (Fremskrittspartiet)	2
Conservative Party (Høyre)	3
Christian Democratic Party (Kristelig Folkeparti)	2
Centre Party (Senterpartiet)	14
Socialist Left Party (Sosialistisk Venstreparti)	3
Liberal Party (Venstre)	1
Total number of members:	37

Nærøy kommunestyre 1995–1999
Party name (in Norwegian)	Number of representatives
Labour Party (Arbeiderpartiet)	11
Progress Party (Fremskrittspartiet)	1
Conservative Party (Høyre)	2
Christian Democratic Party (Kristelig Folkeparti)	2
Centre Party (Senterpartiet)	18
Socialist Left Party (Sosialistisk Venstreparti)	2
Liberal Party (Venstre)	1
Total number of members:	37

Nærøy kommunestyre 1991–1995
Party name (in Norwegian)	Number of representatives
Labour Party (Arbeiderpartiet)	11
Progress Party (Fremskrittspartiet)	1
Conservative Party (Høyre)	2
Christian Democratic Party (Kristelig Folkeparti)	2
Centre Party (Senterpartiet)	16
Socialist Left Party (Sosialistisk Venstreparti)	4
Liberal Party (Venstre)	1
Total number of members:	37

Nærøy kommunestyre 1987–1991
Party name (in Norwegian)	Number of representatives
Labour Party (Arbeiderpartiet)	17
Progress Party (Fremskrittspartiet)	2
Conservative Party (Høyre)	3
Christian Democratic Party (Kristelig Folkeparti)	2
Centre Party (Senterpartiet)	9
Socialist Left Party (Sosialistisk Venstreparti)	2
Liberal Party (Venstre)	2
Total number of members:	37

Nærøy kommunestyre 1983–1987
Party name (in Norwegian)	Number of representatives
Labour Party (Arbeiderpartiet)	17
Conservative Party (Høyre)	4
Christian Democratic Party (Kristelig Folkeparti)	3
Centre Party (Senterpartiet)	9
Socialist Left Party (Sosialistisk Venstreparti)	2
Liberal Party (Venstre)	2
Total number of members:	37

Nærøy kommunestyre 1979–1983
Party name (in Norwegian)	Number of representatives
Labour Party (Arbeiderpartiet)	15
Conservative Party (Høyre)	4
Christian Democratic Party (Kristelig Folkeparti)	4
Centre Party (Senterpartiet)	9
Socialist Left Party (Sosialistisk Venstreparti)	2
Liberal Party (Venstre)	3
Total number of members:	37

Nærøy kommunestyre 1975–1979
Party name (in Norwegian)	Number of representatives
Labour Party (Arbeiderpartiet)	16
Conservative Party (Høyre)	2
Christian Democratic Party (Kristelig Folkeparti)	4
Centre Party (Senterpartiet)	10
Socialist Left Party (Sosialistisk Venstreparti)	2
Liberal Party (Venstre)	3
Total number of members:	37

Nærøy kommunestyre 1971–1975
Party name (in Norwegian)	Number of representatives
Labour Party (Arbeiderpartiet)	17
Conservative Party (Høyre)	1
Communist Party (Kommunistiske Parti)	1
Christian Democratic Party (Kristelig Folkeparti)	4
Centre Party (Senterpartiet)	9
Liberal Party (Venstre)	2
Local List(s) (Lokale lister)	3
Total number of members:	37

Nærøy kommunestyre 1967–1971
Party name (in Norwegian)	Number of representatives
Labour Party (Arbeiderpartiet)	16
Conservative Party (Høyre)	2
Communist Party (Kommunistiske Parti)	1
Christian Democratic Party (Kristelig Folkeparti)	3
Centre Party (Senterpartiet)	8
Liberal Party (Venstre)	3
Local List(s) (Lokale lister)	4
Total number of members:	37

Nærøy kommunestyre 1963–1967
Party name (in Norwegian)	Number of representatives
Labour Party (Arbeiderpartiet)	17
Conservative Party (Høyre)	1
Communist Party (Kommunistiske Parti)	1
Christian Democratic Party (Kristelig Folkeparti)	3
Centre Party (Senterpartiet)	8
Liberal Party (Venstre)	4
Local List(s) (Lokale lister)	3
Total number of members:	37
Note: On 1 January 1964, Gravvik Municipality, Kolvereid Municipality, and most of Foldereid Municipality became part of Nærøy Municipality.

Nærøy herredsstyre 1959–1963
Party name (in Norwegian)	Number of representatives
Labour Party (Arbeiderpartiet)	6
Christian Democratic Party (Kristelig Folkeparti)	2
Centre Party (Senterpartiet)	4
Liberal Party (Venstre)	5
Total number of members:	17

Nærøy herredsstyre 1955–1959
Party name (in Norwegian)	Number of representatives
Labour Party (Arbeiderpartiet)	5
Christian Democratic Party (Kristelig Folkeparti)	3
Farmers' Party (Bondepartiet)	4
Liberal Party (Venstre)	4
Local List(s) (Lokale lister)	1
Total number of members:	17

Nærøy herredsstyre 1951–1955
Party name (in Norwegian)	Number of representatives
Labour Party (Arbeiderpartiet)	7
Christian Democratic Party (Kristelig Folkeparti)	2
Farmers' Party (Bondepartiet)	4
Liberal Party (Venstre)	3
Total number of members:	16

Nærøy herredsstyre 1947–1951
Party name (in Norwegian)	Number of representatives
Labour Party (Arbeiderpartiet)	6
Christian Democratic Party (Kristelig Folkeparti)	2
Farmers' Party (Bondepartiet)	4
Liberal Party (Venstre)	4
Total number of members:	16

Nærøy herredsstyre 1945–1947
Party name (in Norwegian)	Number of representatives
Labour Party (Arbeiderpartiet)	7
Farmers' Party (Bondepartiet)	5
Liberal Party (Venstre)	4
Total number of members:	16

Nærøy herredsstyre 1937–1941*
Party name (in Norwegian)	Number of representatives
Labour Party (Arbeiderpartiet)	4
Farmers' Party (Bondepartiet)	4
Liberal Party (Venstre)	4
List of workers, fishermen, and small farmholders (Arbeidere, fiskere, småbrukere liste)	2
Joint List(s) of Non-Socialist Parties (Borgerlige Felleslister)	1
Local List(s) (Lokale lister)	1
Total number of members:	16
Note: Due to the German occupation of Norway during World War II, no elections were held for new municipal councils until after the war ended in 1945.

=== Mayors ===
The mayor (Norwegian: ordfører) of Nærøy Municipality was the political leader of the municipality and the chairperson of the municipal council. Here is a list of people who held this position:

- 1838–1839: Paul Anzjøn
- 1840–1841: Knud Grimstad
- 1842–1843: Lorns H. Lyngsnes
- 1844–1847: Gerhard Willemsen Iversen
- 1848–1849: Matheus Anzjøn
- 1850–1851: Conrad M. Anzjøn
- 1852–1855: Christian Sverdrup
- 1856–1857: Arendt Lund
- 1858–1859: Fredrik Jensen Storval
- 1860–1861: Conrad M. Anzjøn
- 1862–1863: Ole Thomassen Thorland
- 1864–1865: Fredrik Jensen Storval
- 1866–1868: Peder C. Lund
- 1869–1871: Christian Sverdrup
- 1872–1873: Ole Thomassen Thorland
- 1874–1875: Peter Andreas Strand
- 1876–1879: Peter Olaus Varø
- 1880–1883: Johan Pedersen Laugen (V)
- 1884–1885: Bernt O. Søraa
- 1886–1889: Johan Pedersen Laugen (V)
- 1890–1891: Johan Eliassen Storvedde (V)
- 1892–1895: Georg Brandtzæg (H)
- 1896–1897: Nils Halvorsen Sandnes (H)
- 1898–1904: Georg Nordrum (H)
- 1905–1905: Nils Halvorsen Sandnes (H)
- 1905–1916: Nils Christian Brandtzæg (H)
- 1917–1919: Julian Knotten (V)
- 1920–1922: Nils Christian Brandtzæg (H)
- 1923–1928: Axel Sund (V)
- 1929–1940: Olav Bog (V)
- 1941–1943: Jens Christian Williksen (NS)
- 1943–1945: Meier Jensen (NS)
- 1945–1945: Olav Bog (V)
- 1946–1947: Jens Folkestad (Bp)
- 1948–1951: Martin Strandvahl (V)
- 1952–1955: Haakon Sandnes (Bp)
- 1956–1957: Martin Strandvahl (V)
- 1958–1958: Arnvid Førde (Bp)
- 1959–1961: Kåre Hildrum (Bp)
- 1962–1967: Arne Løvmo (V)
- 1968–1969: Birger Øverås (Sp)
- 1970–1971: Ebbe Skillingstad (Sp)
- 1972–1975: Arne Ness (Ap)
- 1976–1979: Kåre Aarmo (KrF)
- 1980–1983: Odd Bach (Sp)
- 1984–1989: Åsmund Rønningen (Ap)
- 1990–1998: Hans Mo (Sp)
- 1998–2019: Steinar Aspli (Sp)

== Transportation ==
Norwegian County Road 17 crossed the northeastern part of the municipality. There was a large network of bridges in the municipality that connected the islands and crossed the fjords. Most notably was the Marøysund Bridge and Nærøysund Bridge which connected Nærøy Municipality to Vikna Municipality to the west. Also Hestøy Bridge and Smines Bridge connected the village of Lund to Fosnes Municipality to the south.

== Media gallery ==
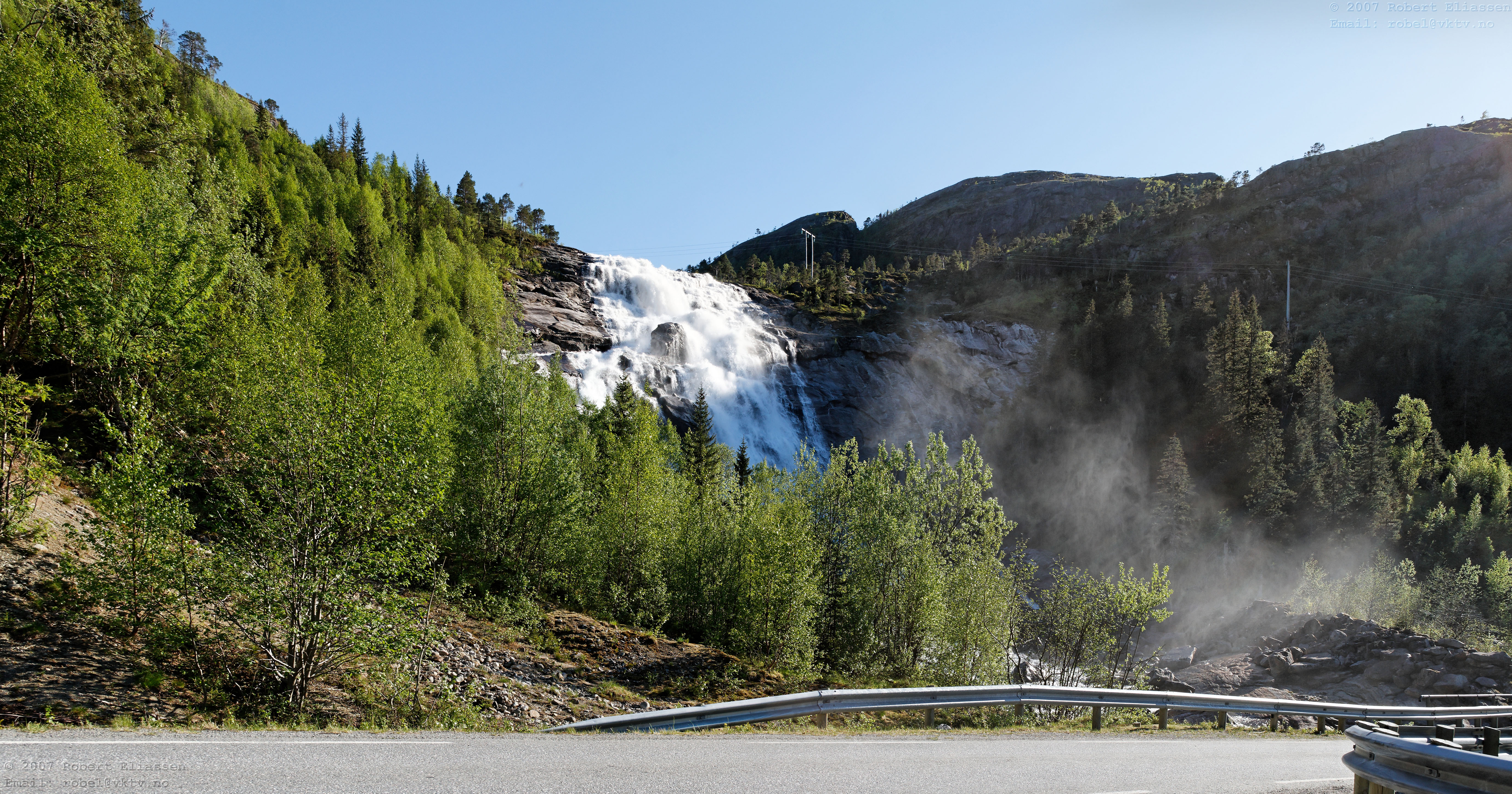
Skrøyvstad waterfall in Nærøy

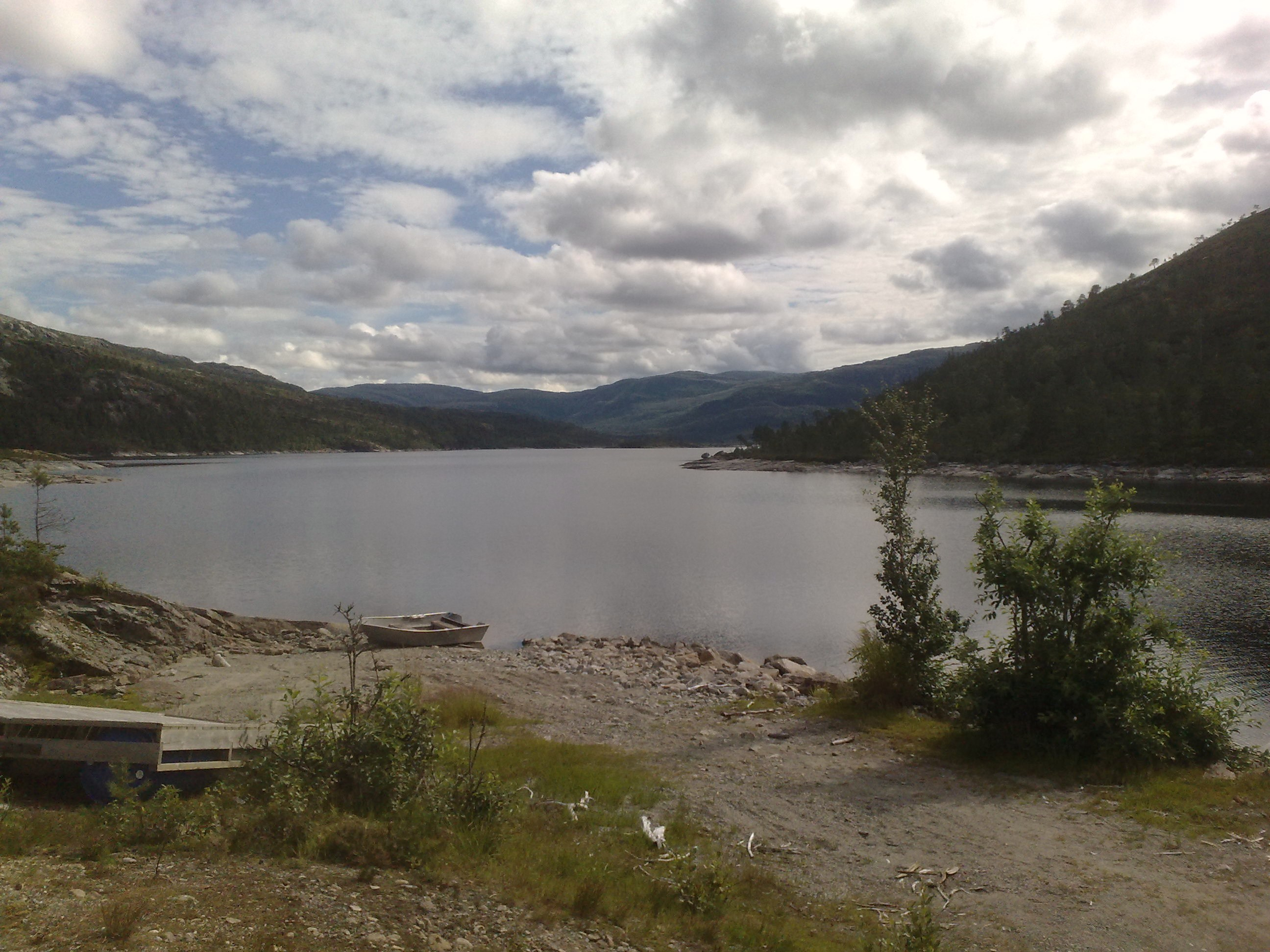
View of Mjøsund

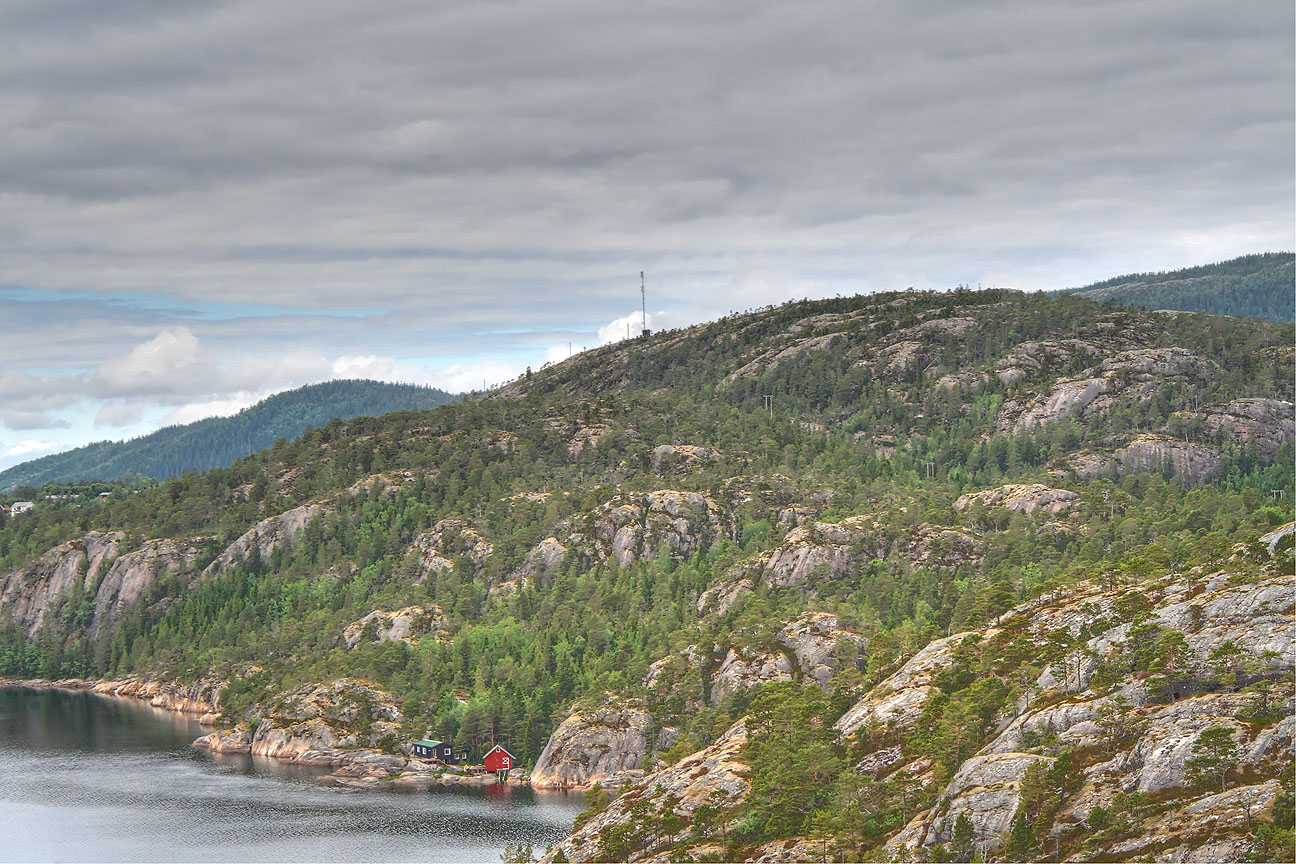
Torfjellet; pine clad hills and narrow bays and fjords are typical here

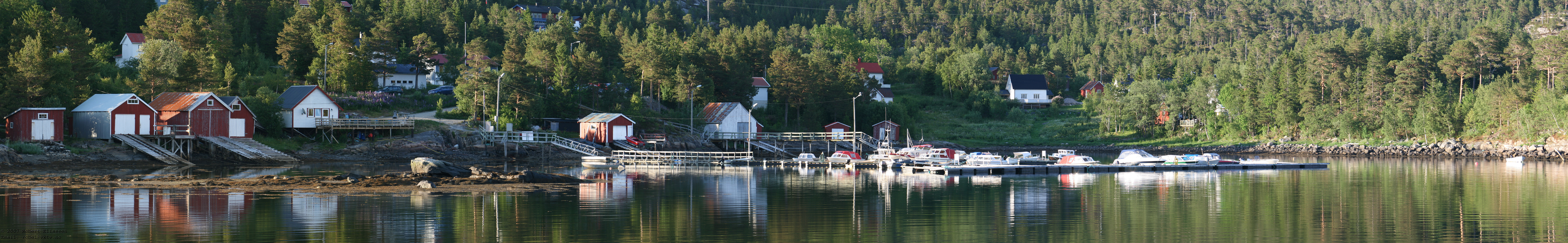
Panorama of the Langnes area in Salsbruket

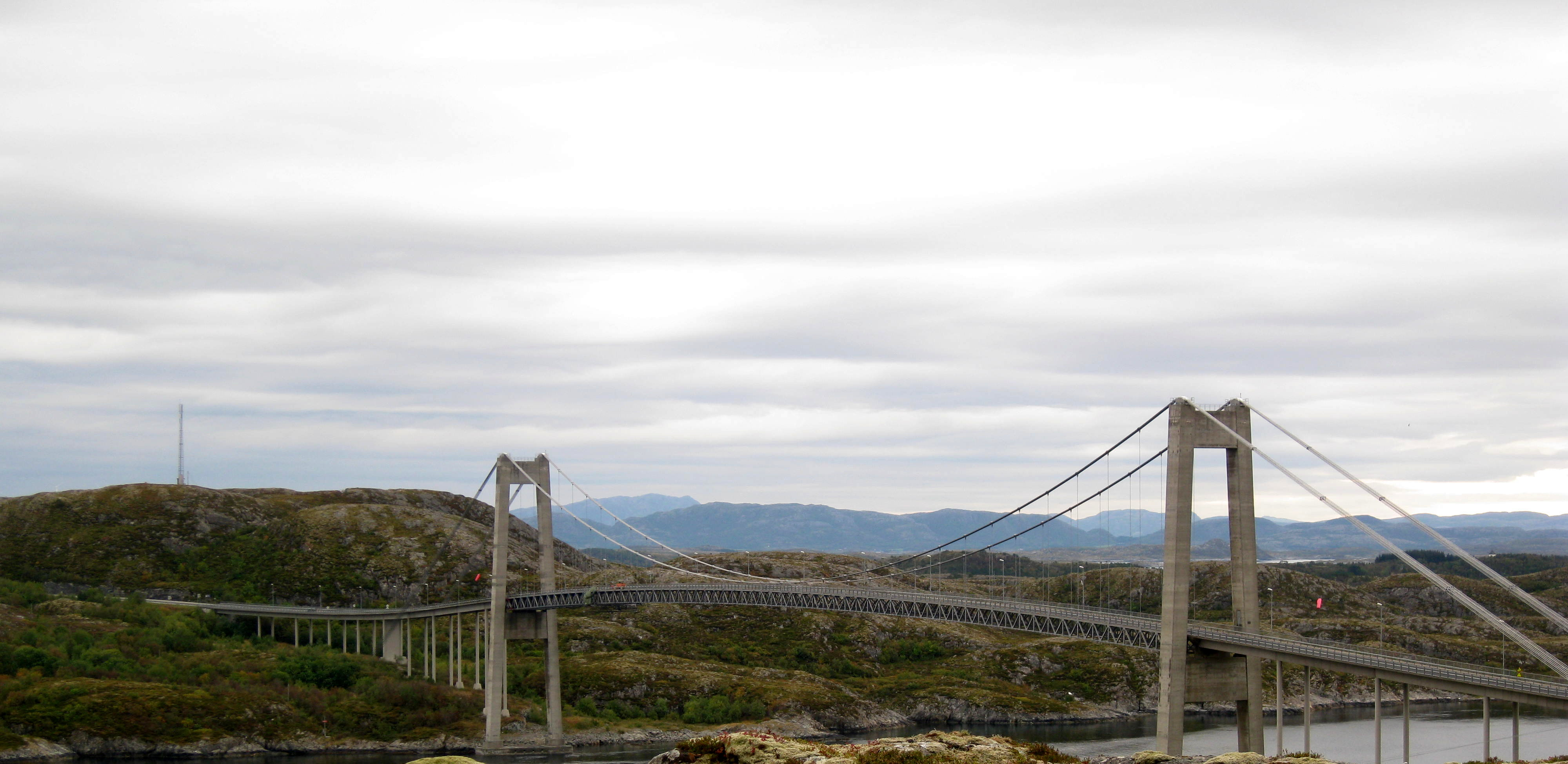
View of the Nærøysund Bridge

== See also ==
- Hundhammerfjellet wind farm
- List of former municipalities of Norway
