= Kolvereid Municipality =

Former municipality in Trøndelag, Norway

Kolvereid Municipality Kolvereid herred
- Former municipality
- Nord-Trøndelag within Norway

- Kolvereid within Nord-Trøndelag
- Coordinates: 64°51′55″N 11°36′16″E
- Country: Norway
- County: Nord-Trøndelag
- District: Namdalen
- Established: 1 Jan 1838
  - Created as: Formannskapsdistrikt
- Disestablished: 1 Jan 1964
  - Succeeded by: Nærøy Municipality
- Administrative centre: Kolvereid

Government
  - Mayor (1946–1963): Arne Fagernes (Ap)

Area (upon dissolution)
  - Total: 432.7 km^{2} (167.1 sq mi)
  - Rank: #224 in Norway
- Highest elevation: 806 m (2,644 ft)

Population (1963)
  - Total: 2,459
  - Rank: #371 in Norway
  - Density: 5.7/km^{2} (15/sq mi)
  - Change (10 years): ▼ −0.2%

Official language
  - Norwegian form: Nynorsk
- Time zone: UTC+01:00 (CET)
  - Summer (DST): UTC+02:00 (CEST)
- ISO 3166 code: NO-1752

Kolvereid is a former municipality in the old Nord-Trøndelag county, Norway. The 433-square-kilometre (167 sq mi) municipality existed from 1838 until its dissolution in 1964. The municipality encompassed the central part of what is now Nærøysund Municipality in Trøndelag county. The municipality included both sides of the central part of the Folda fjord. The administrative centre was the village of Kolvereid where the Kolvereid Church is located.

Prior to its dissolution in 1964, the 433-square-kilometre (167 sq mi) municipality was the 224th largest by area out of the 689 municipalities in Norway. Kolvereid Municipality was the 371st most populous municipality in Norway with a population of about 2,459. The municipality's population density was 5.7 inhabitants per square kilometre (15/sq mi) and its population had decreased by 0.2% over the previous 10-year period.

== General information ==
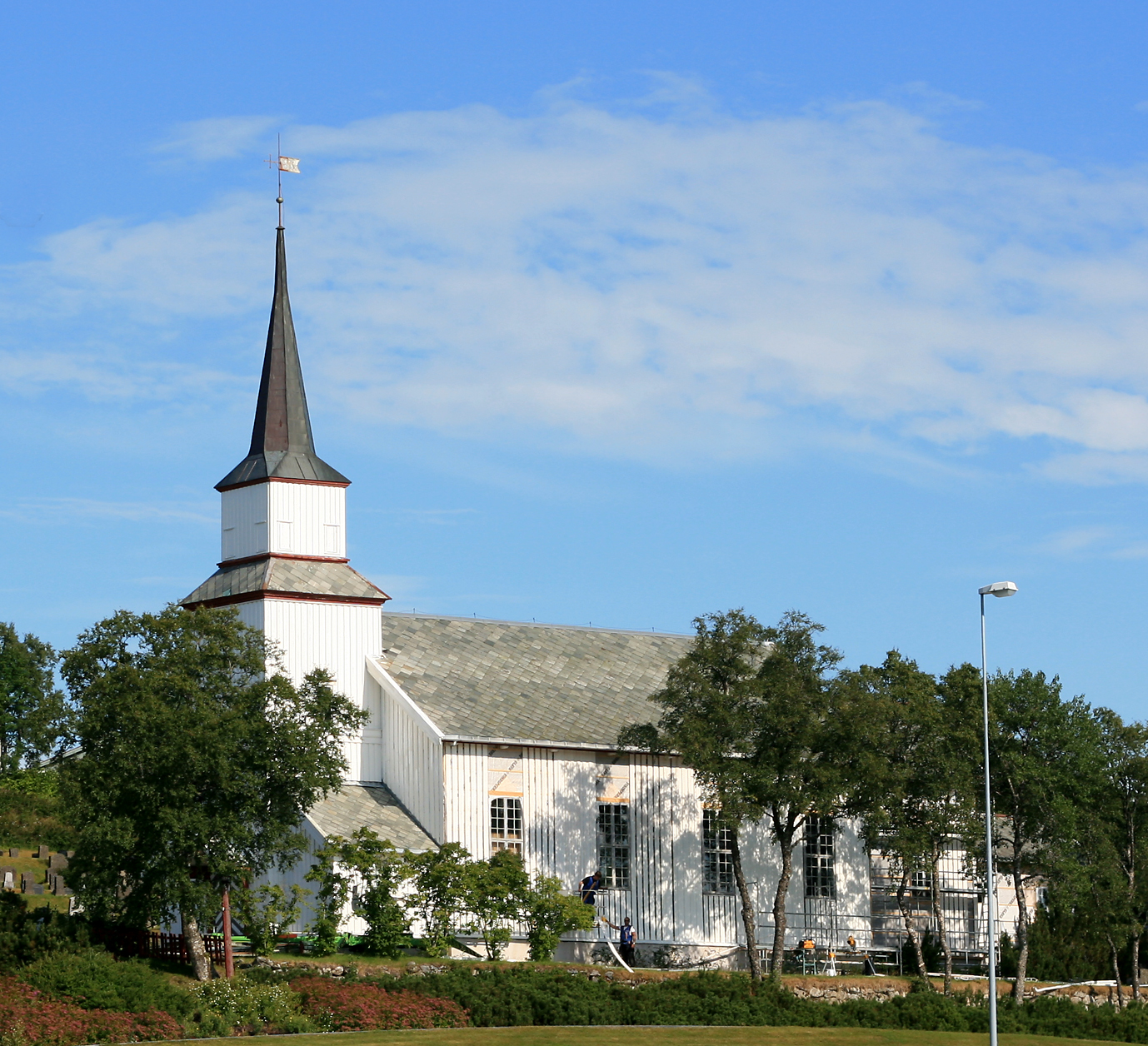
Kolvereid Church

The municipality of Kolvereid was established on 1 January 1838 (see formannskapsdistrikt law). In 1860, the northern islands and coastal area of the Kolvereid Municipality (population: 1,702) was separated to become the new Leka Municipality. Then on 1 October 1886, the northeastern part of the municipality (population: 948) surrounding the innermost parts of the Foldafjord was separated to become the new Foldereid Municipality. This left Kolvereid Municipality with 1,716 residents. On 1 January 1902, an unpopulated part of Kolvereid Municipality was transferred to the neighboring Nærøy Municipality.

During the 1960s, there were many municipal mergers across Norway due to the work of the Schei Committee. On 1 January 1964, a large merger took place which dissolved the Kolvereid Municipality. The following areas were merged to form a new, larger Nærøy Municipality:

- all of Kolvereid Municipality (population: 2,426)
- all of Nærøy Municipality (population: 2,182)
- all of Gravvik Municipality (population: 816)
- the western two-thirds of Foldereid Municipality (population: 817)

=== Name ===
The municipality (originally the parish) is named after the old Kolvereid farm (Old Norse: Kolfareið) since the first Kolvereid Church was built there. The meaning of the first element is uncertain, but it could come from the word kolfr which means "bell clapper". This may have been the old name for the local fjord, now called the Kolvereidvågen, or it could have been named after a nearby mountain. The last element is eið which means "isthmus".

=== Churches ===
The Church of Norway had one parish (sokn) within Kolvereid Municipality. At the time of the municipal dissolution, it was part of the Kolvereid prestegjeld and the Ytre Namdal prosti (deanery) in the Diocese of Nidaros.

Churches in Kolvereid Municipality
Parish (sokn)	Church name	Location of the church	Year built
Kolvereid	Kolvereid Church	Kolvereid	1874
Kolvereid	Salsbruket Chapel	Salsbruket	1950

== Geography ==
Kolvereid Municipality was located in the northwestern part of Nord-Trøndelag county. It was bordered by Foldereid Municipality and Gravvik Municipality to the north, Nærøy Municipality to the west, Fosnes Municipality to the south, and Høylandet Municipality to the east. The highest point in the municipality was the 806-metre (2,644 ft) tall mountain Kjøringvassfjellet, on the border with Høylandet Municipality and Foldereid Municipality.

== Government ==
While it existed, Kolvereid Municipality was responsible for primary education (through 10th grade), outpatient health services, senior citizen services, welfare and other social services, zoning, economic development, and municipal roads and utilities. The municipality was governed by a municipal council of directly elected representatives. The mayor was indirectly elected by a vote of the municipal council. The municipality was under the jurisdiction of the Frostating Court of Appeal.

=== Municipal council ===
The municipal council (Herredsstyre) of Kolvereid Municipality was made up of 17 representatives that were elected to four year terms. The tables below show the historical composition of the council by political party.

Kolvereid heradsstyre 1959–1963
Party name (in Nynorsk)	Number of representatives
Labour Party (Arbeidarpartiet)	8
Christian Democratic Party (Kristeleg Folkeparti)	1
Centre Party (Senterpartiet)	3
Liberal Party (Venstre)	1
Local List(s) (Lokale lister)	4
Total number of members:	17
Note: On 1 January 1964, Kolvereid Municipality became part of Nærøy Municipality.

Kolvereid heradsstyre 1955–1959
Party name (in Nynorsk)	Number of representatives
Labour Party (Arbeidarpartiet)	10
Farmers' Party (Bondepartiet)	3
Liberal Party (Venstre)	3
Local List(s) (Lokale lister)	1
Total number of members:	17

Kolvereid heradsstyre 1951–1955
Party name (in Nynorsk)	Number of representatives
Labour Party (Arbeidarpartiet)	8
Farmers' Party (Bondepartiet)	3
Liberal Party (Venstre)	3
Local List(s) (Lokale lister)	2
Total number of members:	16

Kolvereid heradsstyre 1947–1951
Party name (in Nynorsk)	Number of representatives
Labour Party (Arbeidarpartiet)	10
Farmers' Party (Bondepartiet)	3
Liberal Party (Venstre)	3
Total number of members:	16

Kolvereid heradsstyre 1945–1947
Party name (in Nynorsk)	Number of representatives
Labour Party (Arbeidarpartiet)	10
Farmers' Party (Bondepartiet)	3
Liberal Party (Venstre)	3
Total number of members:	16

Kolvereid heradsstyre 1937–1941*
Party name (in Nynorsk)	Number of representatives
Labour Party (Arbeidarpartiet)	8
Farmers' Party (Bondepartiet)	5
Liberal Party (Venstre)	3
Total number of members:	16
Note: Due to the German occupation of Norway during World War II, no elections were held for new municipal councils until after the war ended in 1945.

=== Mayors ===
The mayor (Nynorsk: ordførar) of Kolvereid Municipality was the political leader of the municipality and the chairperson of the municipal council. Here is a list of people who held this position:

- 1838–1839: Fredrik Christian Grevenkopf Lied
- 1840–1843: Henrik Støren
- 1844–1847: Johan August Buchholdt
- 1848–1849: Henrik Støren
- 1850–1851: Nicolaus Selliseth
- 1852–1853: H.J. Gansmo
- 1854–1855: Nicolaus Selliseth
- 1856–1857: Olaus Berg
- 1858–1859: Knut Thorkelsen
- 1860–1861: H.J. Gansmo
- 1862–1865: Sivert Moe
- 1866–1869: Knut Thorkelsen
- 1870–1873: Mikal Evensen
- 1874–1877: Erik Herlaugsen Lien
- 1878–1885: Vilhelm Andreas Wexelsen (V)
- 1886–1889: Adolf Sverdrup (H)
- 1890–1893: Ingebrigt Gudbrandsen (H)
- 1894–1898: Adolf Sverdrup (H)
- 1899–1904: Christian Wendelbo Strand (H)
- 1905–1913: Jakob Sverdrup (H)
- 1914–1919: Nils Trædal (V)
- 1919–1920: Johan A. Lund (V)
- 1920–1934: Torgeir P. Lund (V)
- 1935–1938: Vilhelm Flotvik (Ap)
- 1938–1945: Jens Kruse (Bp)
- 1945–1945: Fredrik Eidshaug (V)
- 1946–1963: Arne Fagernes (Ap)

== See also ==
- List of former municipalities of Norway
