= Foldereid Municipality =

Former municipality in Trøndelag, Norway

Foldereid Municipality Foldereid herred
- Former municipality
- Nord-Trøndelag within Norway

- Foldereid within Nord-Trøndelag
- Coordinates: 64°57′40″N 12°10′46″E
- Country: Norway
- County: Nord-Trøndelag
- District: Namdalen
- Established: 1 Oct 1886
  - Preceded by: Kolvereid Municipality
- Disestablished: 1 Jan 1964
  - Succeeded by: Nærøy Municipality and Høylandet Municipality
- Administrative centre: Foldereid

Government
  - Mayor (1960–1963): Sveinung Leirvik (Sp)

Area (upon dissolution)
  - Total: 519.6 km^{2} (200.6 sq mi)
  - Rank: #191 in Norway
- Highest elevation: 873.58 m (2,866.1 ft)

Population (1963)
  - Total: 1,036
  - Rank: #606 in Norway
  - Density: 2/km^{2} (5.2/sq mi)
  - Change (10 years): ▼ −4.2%
- Demonym: Foldbygg

Official language
  - Norwegian form: Nynorsk
- Time zone: UTC+01:00 (CET)
  - Summer (DST): UTC+02:00 (CEST)
- ISO 3166 code: NO-1743

Foldereid is a former municipality in the northern part of the old Nord-Trøndelag county in Norway. The 520-square-kilometre (200 sq mi) municipality existed from 1886 until its dissolution in 1964. The municipality encompassed the area surrounding the inner part of the Folda fjord, the Innerfolda in the present-day Nærøysund Municipality and Høylandet Municipality in Trøndelag county. The village of Foldereid, where the Foldereid Church is located, was the administrative centre of the municipality.

Prior to its dissolution in 1964, the 520-square-kilometre (200 sq mi) municipality was the 191st largest by area out of the 689 municipalities in Norway. Foldereid Municipality was the 606th most populous municipality in Norway with a population of about 1,036. The municipality's population density was 2 inhabitants per square kilometre (5.2/sq mi) and its population had decreased by 4.2% over the previous 10-year period.

== General information ==
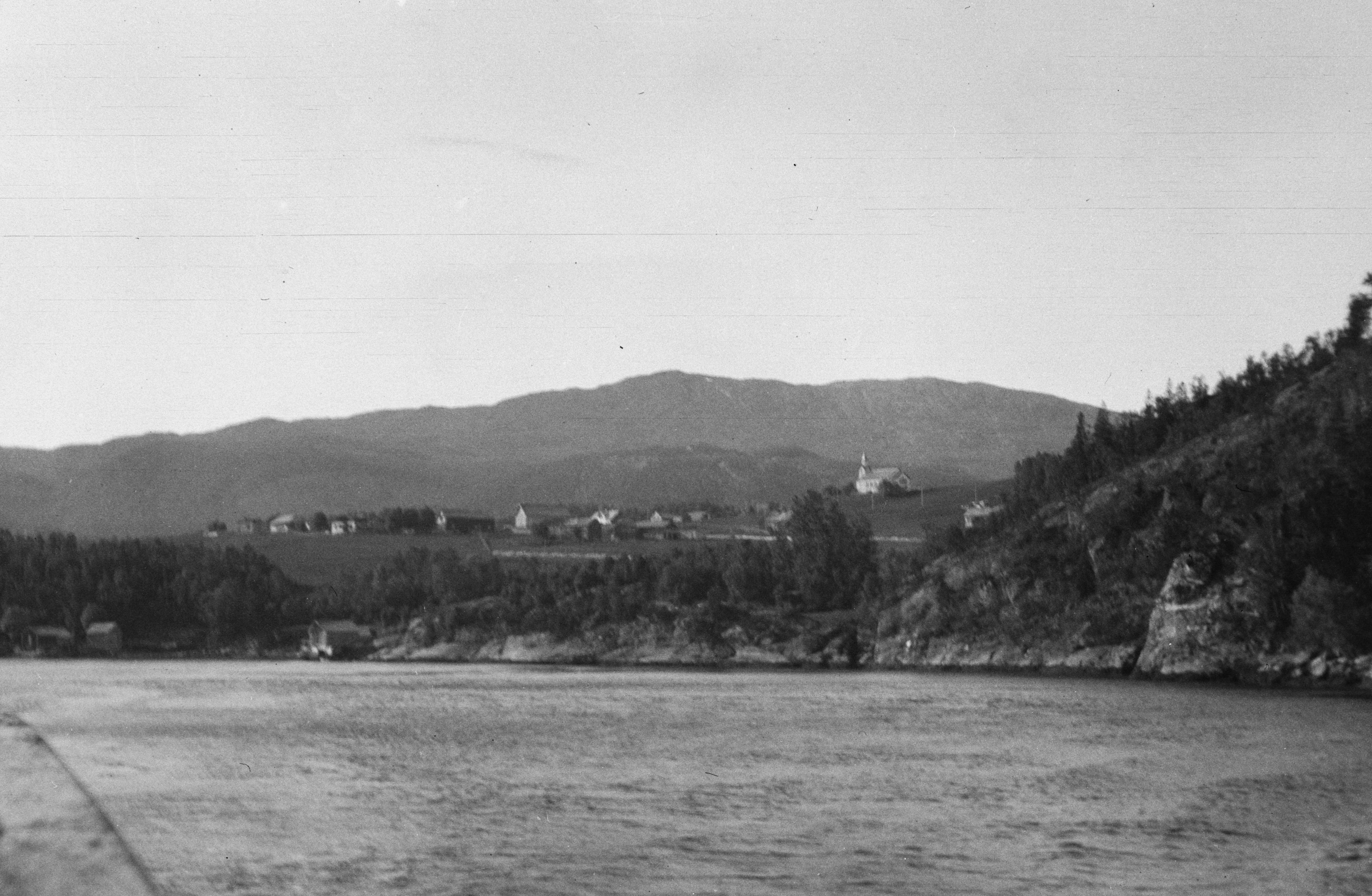
Historic photo of Foldereid

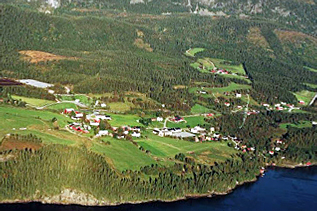
View of the village of Foldereid

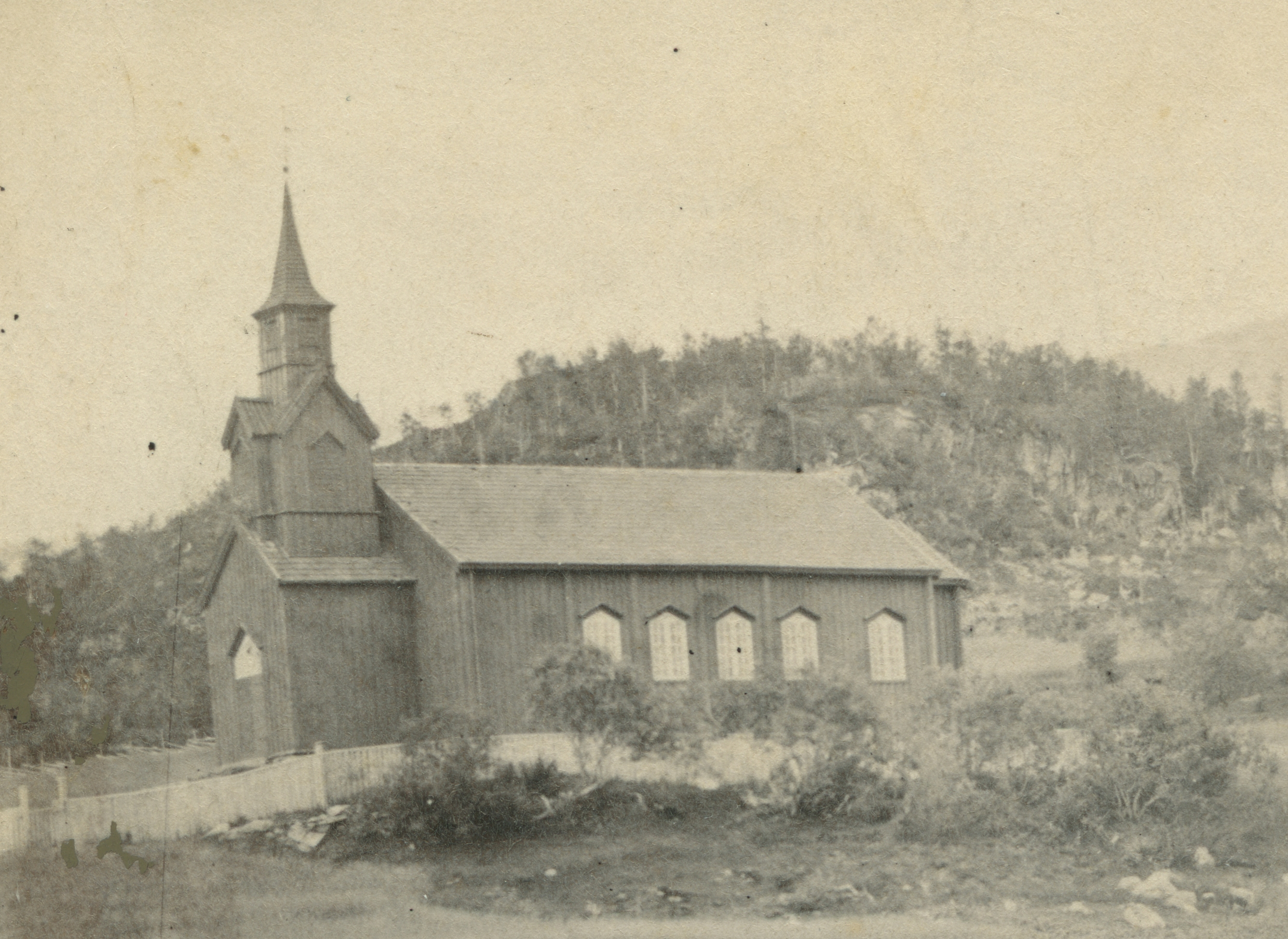
Foldereid Church (aft. 1863)

The municipality of Foldereid was established on 1 October 1886 when it was separated from the large Kolvereid Municipality. Initially, the new municipality had 948 residents.

During the 1960s, there were many municipal mergers across Norway due to the work of the Schei Committee. On 1 January 1964, a large merger took place which dissolved Foldereid Municipality. The following areas were merged to form a new, larger Nærøy Municipality:

- the western two-thirds of Foldereid Municipality (population: 817
- all of Kolvereid Municipality (population: 2,426))
- all of Gravvik Municipality (population: 816)
- all of Nærøy Municipality (population: 2,182)

On the same date, the eastern third of Foldereid Municipality, the Kongsmoen area, (population: 221) was merged into the neighboring Høylandet Municipality.

=== Name ===
The municipality (originally the parish) is named after the old Foldereid farm (Old Norse: Foldareið). The farm is named after the local fjord, Foldafjorden. The first element is the genitive case of the name of the local fjord, fold, which has an uncertain meaning. The last element is eið which means "isthmus", due to the fact that the Foldereid farm lies on a rather flat piece of land that is about 2 kilometres (1.2 mi) wide between the Foldafjorden and an arm of the Bindalsfjorden to the north.

=== Churches ===
The Church of Norway had one parish (sokn) within Foldereid Municipality. At the time of the municipal dissolution, it was part of the Kolvereid prestegjeld and the Ytre Namdal prosti (deanery) in the Diocese of Nidaros.

Churches in Foldereid Municipality
Parish (sokn)	Church name	Location of the church	Year built
Foldereid	Foldereid Church	Foldereid	1863

== Geography ==
Foldereid Municipality was located in the northern part of Nord-Trøndelag county. It was bordered by Bindal Municipality (in Nordland county) in the north, Gravvik Municipality to the northwest, Kolvereid Municipality to the southwest, Høylandet Municipality to the south, and Namsskogan Municipality to the east. The highest point in the municipality was the 873.58-metre (2,866.1 ft) tall mountain Fuglstadfjellet on the border with Bindal Municipality to the north.

== Government ==
While it existed, Foldereid Municipality was responsible for primary education (through 10th grade), outpatient health services, senior citizen services, welfare and other social services, zoning, economic development, and municipal roads and utilities. The municipality was governed by a municipal council of directly elected representatives. The mayor was indirectly elected by a vote of the municipal council. The municipality was under the jurisdiction of the Frostating Court of Appeal.

=== Municipal council ===
The municipal council (Herredsstyre) of Foldereid Municipality was made up of 13 representatives that were elected to four year terms. The tables below show the historical composition of the council by political party.

Foldereid heradsstyre 1959–1963
Party name (in Nynorsk)	Number of representatives
Labour Party (Arbeidarpartiet)	6
Christian Democratic Party (Kristeleg Folkeparti)	1
Joint List(s) of Non-Socialist Parties (Borgarlege Felleslister)	6
Total number of members:	13
Note: On 1 January 1964, Foldereid Municipality became part of Høylandet Municipality and Nærøy Municipality.

Foldereid heradsstyre 1955–1959
Party name (in Nynorsk)	Number of representatives
Labour Party (Arbeidarpartiet)	7
Joint List(s) of Non-Socialist Parties (Borgarlege Felleslister)	6
Total number of members:	13

Foldereid heradsstyre 1951–1955
Party name (in Nynorsk)	Number of representatives
Labour Party (Arbeidarpartiet)	5
Joint List(s) of Non-Socialist Parties (Borgarlege Felleslister)	7
Total number of members:	12

Foldereid heradsstyre 1947–1951
Party name (in Nynorsk)	Number of representatives
Labour Party (Arbeidarpartiet)	6
Farmers' Party (Bondepartiet)	4
Liberal Party (Venstre)	2
Total number of members:	12

Foldereid heradsstyre 1945–1947
Party name (in Nynorsk)	Number of representatives
Labour Party (Arbeidarpartiet)	6
Farmers' Party (Bondepartiet)	3
Liberal Party (Venstre)	1
Local List(s) (Lokale lister)	2
Total number of members:	12

Foldereid heradsstyre 1937–1941*
Party name (in Nynorsk)	Number of representatives
Labour Party (Arbeidarpartiet)	5
Joint List(s) of Non-Socialist Parties (Borgarlege Felleslister)	6
Local List(s) (Lokale lister)	1
Total number of members:	12
Note: Due to the German occupation of Norway during World War II, no elections were held for new municipal councils until after the war ended in 1945.

=== Mayors ===
The mayor (Nynorsk: ordførar) of Foldereid Municipality was the political leader of the municipality and the chairperson of the municipal council. Here is a list of people who held this position:

- 1887–1889: Haagen E. Andersen
- 1890–1891: Ole Tobias Olsen
- 1892–1895: Martin Rosendal
- 1896–1903: Johannes Klingen
- 1904–1904: Even M. Aune
- 1905–1907: Martin Rosendal
- 1908–1919: Andreas Synnes
- 1920–1922: Jermund E. Homo (Bp)
- 1923–1928: Richard Sivertsen (Bp)
- 1929–1931: Jermund E. Homo (Bp)
- 1932–1934: Peter Jæger-Leirvik (Bp)
- 1935–1937: Bjarne Krekling (Bp)
- 1938–1940: Stockfleth Saur (Bp)
- 1940–1942: Ingvald Rishaug
- 1942–1945: Peter Jæger-Leirvik (NS)
- 1945–1947: Stockfleth Saur (Bp)
- 1948–1951: Bjarne Krekling (Bp)
- 1952–1955: Karl Vennevik (Bp)
- 1956–1959: Gunnar Brevik (Bp)
- 1960–1963: Sveinung Leirvik (Bp)

== See also ==
- List of former municipalities of Norway
