= Gravvik Municipality =

Former municipality in Trøndelag, Norway

Gravvik Municipality Gravvik herred
- Former municipality
- Gravik herred (historic name)
- Nord-Trøndelag within Norway

- Gravvik within Nord-Trøndelag
- Coordinates: 64°59′24″N 11°46′07″E
- Country: Norway
- County: Nord-Trøndelag
- District: Namdalen
- Established: 1 Jan 1909
  - Preceded by: Leka Municipality
- Disestablished: 1 Jan 1964
  - Succeeded by: Nærøy Municipality
- Administrative centre: Gravvika

Government
  - Mayor (1960–1963): Edvin Aspli (Sp)

Area (upon dissolution)
  - Total: 191.6 km^{2} (74.0 sq mi)
  - Rank: #380 in Norway
- Highest elevation: 591 m (1,939 ft)

Population (1963)
  - Total: 804
  - Rank: #645 in Norway
  - Density: 4.2/km^{2} (11/sq mi)
  - Change (10 years): ▼ −9.6%

Official language
  - Norwegian form: Neutral
- Time zone: UTC+01:00 (CET)
  - Summer (DST): UTC+02:00 (CEST)
- ISO 3166 code: NO-1754

Gravvik is a former municipality in the old Nord-Trøndelag county, Norway. The 192-square-kilometre (74 sq mi) municipality existed from 1909 until its dissolution in 1964. The municipality covered the northern coastal areas of the present-day Nærøysund Municipality in Trøndelag county. The administrative centre of the municipality was the village of Gravvika where the Gravvik Church is located.

Prior to its dissolution in 1964, the 192-square-kilometre (74 sq mi) municipality was the 380th largest by area out of the 689 municipalities in Norway. Gravvik Municipality was the 645th most populous municipality in Norway with a population of about 804. The municipality's population density was 4.2 inhabitants per square kilometre (11/sq mi) and its population had decreased by 9.6% over the previous 10-year period.

== General information ==
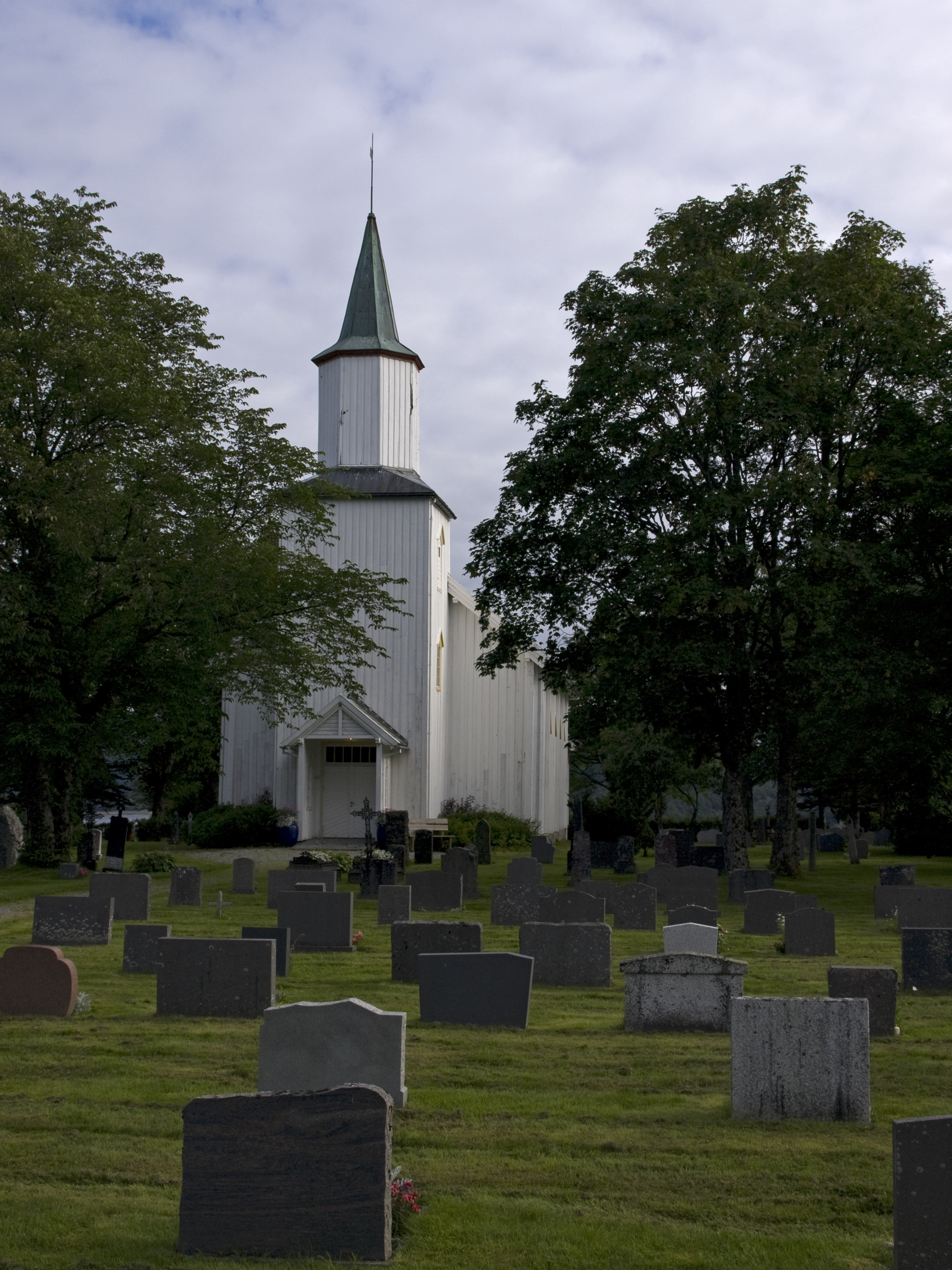
Gravvik Church

The municipality of Gravik (later spelled Gravvik) was established on 1 January 1909 when Leka Municipality was divided in two. The northern island area (population: 1,209) became the new (smaller) Leka Municipality and the southern coastal area (population: 881) became Gravvik Municipality.

During the 1960s, there were many municipal mergers across Norway due to the work of the Schei Committee. On 1 January 1964, a large merger took place which dissolved Gravvik Municipality. The following areas were merged to form a new, larger Nærøy Municipality:

- all of Gravvik Municipality (population: 816)
- all of Kolvereid Municipality (population: 2,426)
- all of Nærøy Municipality (population: 2,182)
- the western two-thirds of Foldereid Municipality (population: 817)

=== Name ===
The municipality (originally the parish) is named after the old Gravik farm which was named after the local Gravikvågen bay. The first element comes from the Old Norse word grǫf which means "grave". The last element is vik which means "cove" or "inlet". The name of the municipality was spelled Gravik from its establishment in 1909 until 15 August 1913 when a royal resolution changed the spelling of the name of the municipality to Gravvik.

=== Churches ===
The Church of Norway had one parish (sokn) within Gravvik Municipality. At the time of the municipal dissolution, it was part of the Leka prestegjeld and the Ytre Namdal prosti (deanery) in the Diocese of Nidaros.

Churches in Gravvik Municipality
Parish (sokn)	Church name	Location of the church	Year built
Gravvik	Gravvik Church	Gravvika	1875

== Geography ==
Gravvik Municipality was located in the northwestern part of Nord-Trøndelag county. It was bordered by Bindal Municipality (in Nordland county) in the northeast, Leka Municipality to the northwest, Kolvereid Municipality to the southwest, and Foldereid Municipality to the southeast. The highest point in the municipality was the 591-metre (1,939 ft) tall mountain Haltussen, on the border with Foldereid Municipality.

== Government ==
During its existence, Gravvik Municipality was responsible for primary education (through 10th grade), outpatient health services, senior citizen services, welfare and other social services, zoning, economic development, and municipal roads and utilities. The municipality was governed by a municipal council of directly elected representatives. The mayor was indirectly elected by a vote of the municipal council. The municipality was under the jurisdiction of the Frostating Court of Appeal.

=== Municipal council ===
The municipal council (Herredsstyre) of Gravvik Municipality was made up of 13 representatives that were elected to four year terms. The tables below show the historical composition of the council by political party.

Gravvik herredsstyre 1959–1963
Party name (in Norwegian)	Number of representatives
Local List(s) (Lokale lister)	13
Total number of members:	13
Note: On 1 January 1964, Gravvik Municipality became part of Nærøy Municipality.

Gravvik herredsstyre 1955–1959
Party name (in Norwegian)	Number of representatives
Local List(s) (Lokale lister)	13
Total number of members:	13

Gravvik herredsstyre 1951–1955
Party name (in Norwegian)	Number of representatives
Labour Party (Arbeiderpartiet)	3
Local List(s) (Lokale lister)	9
Total number of members:	12

Gravvik herredsstyre 1947–1951
Party name (in Norwegian)	Number of representatives
Local List(s) (Lokale lister)	12
Total number of members:	12

Gravvik herredsstyre 1945–1947
Party name (in Norwegian)	Number of representatives
Local List(s) (Lokale lister)	12
Total number of members:	12

Gravvik herredsstyre 1937–1941*
Party name (in Norwegian)	Number of representatives
Labour Party (Arbeiderpartiet)	1
List of workers, fishermen, and small farmholders (Arbeidere, fiskere, småbrukere liste)	1
Joint List(s) of Non-Socialist Parties (Borgerlige Felleslister)	4
Local List(s) (Lokale lister)	6
Total number of members:	12
Note: Due to the German occupation of Norway during World War II, no elections were held for new municipal councils until after the war ended in 1945.

=== Mayors ===
The mayor (Norwegian: ordfører) of Gravvik Municipality was the political leader of the municipality and the chairperson of the municipal council. Here is a list of people who held this position:

- 1908–1913: Karl August Jensen (H)
- 1914–1919: Martin Mortensen Skotvik
- 1920–1922: Jakob Dølør (V)
- 1923–1925: Ole Wang Skotnes
- 1926–1928: Ole Dragland (Bp)
- 1929–1942: Mathias K. Hagen (Bp)
- 1942–1945: Arne Olsen
- 1945–1945: Jens Wang
- 1946–1947: Ingvard Hiller
- 1948–1950: Bjarne Størdal
- 1950–1951: Fredrik Gansmo
- 1952–1959: Harald Tømmervik (Bp)
- 1960–1963: Edvin Aspli (Sp)

== See also ==
- List of former municipalities of Norway
