= Kolvereid =

Town in Nærøysund Municipality, Norway

- Town/City
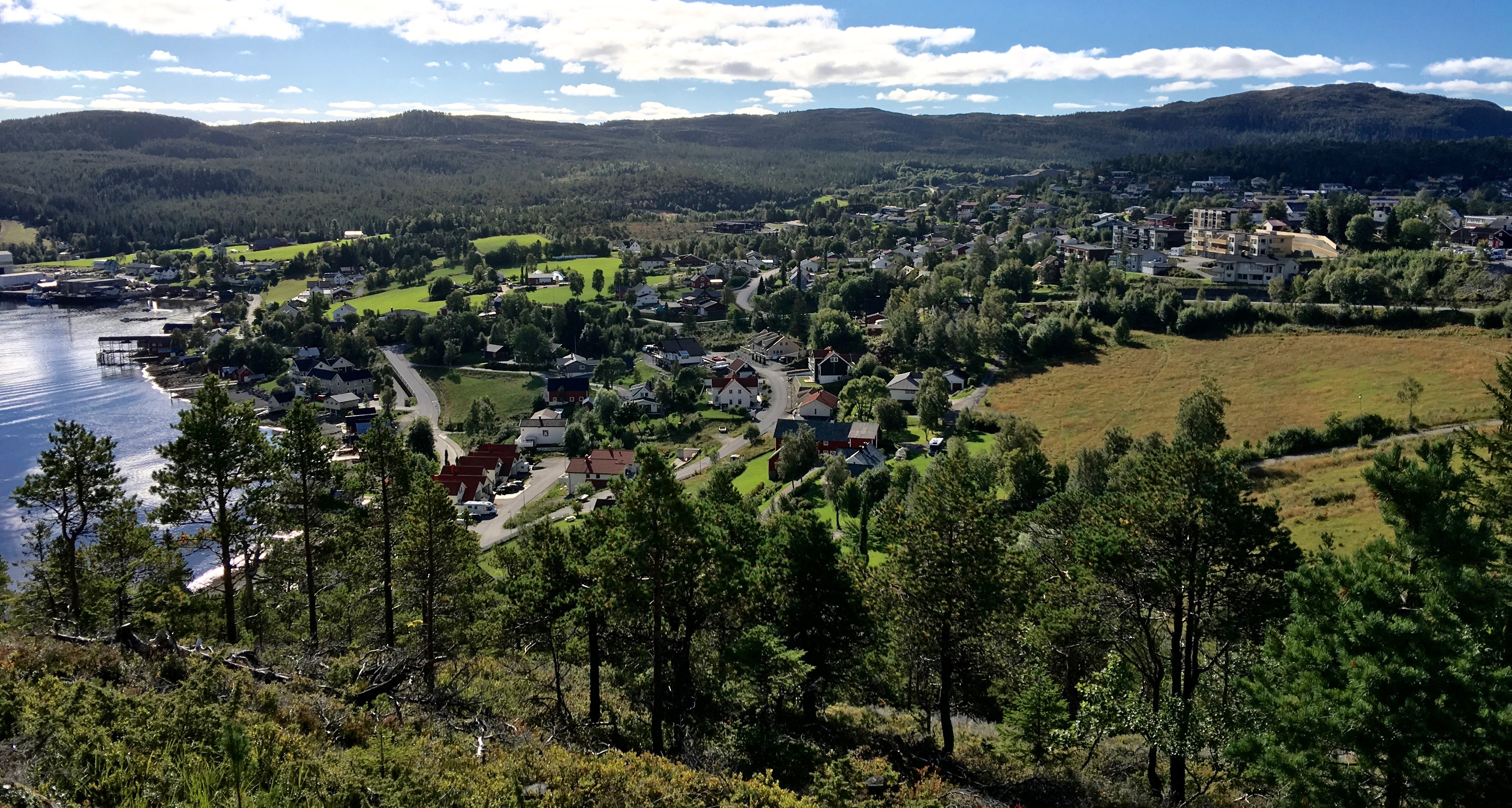
- View of the town
- Interactive map of Kolvereid
- Location within Trøndelag Location within Norway
- Coordinates: 64.8655°N 11.6046°E
- Country: Norway
- Region: Central Norway
- County: Trøndelag
- District: Namdalen
- Municipality: Nærøysund Municipality
- Established as
- Town (By): 2002

Area
  - Total: 1.29 km^{2} (0.50 sq mi)
- Elevation: 65 m (213 ft)

Population (2024)
  - Total: 1,791
  - Density: 1,388/km^{2} (3,590/sq mi)
- Time zone: UTC+01:00 (CET)
  - Summer (DST): UTC+02:00 (CEST)
- Post Code: 7970 Kolvereid

Kolvereid is a town in Nærøysund Municipality in Trøndelag county, Norway. The town of Kolvereid is located at the west end of the Kolvereidvågen bay, off of the inner part of the Foldafjord. The Norwegian County Road 770 runs through the town, connecting it to the nearby town of Rørvik to the west and to the village of Foldereid to the east.

The town was the administrative centre of the old Nærøy Municipality from 1964 until 2020 when it was merged into Nærøysund Municipality. Before that, Kolvereid was the administrative centre of the old Kolvereid Municipality which existed from 1838 until 1964.

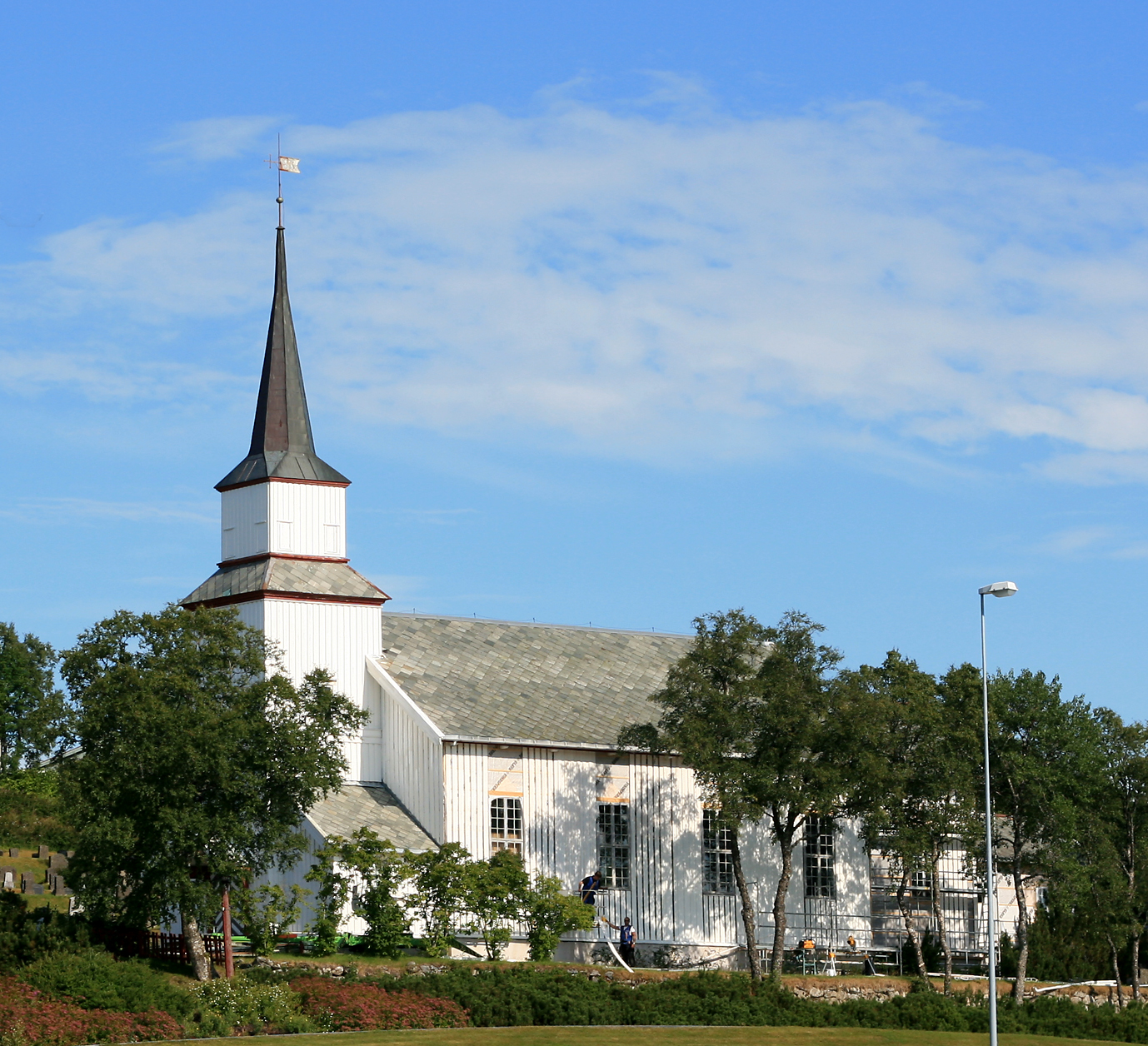
Kolvereid Church

Nærøy Municipality declared town status for the village of Kolvereid in 2002, making it the smallest town in Norway. The 1.29-square-kilometre (320-acre) town has a population (2024) of 1,791 and a population density of 1,388 inhabitants per square kilometre (3,590/sq mi).

Kolvereid is located in the middle of Nærøysund, with the town located on the shore of the Foldafjord. The area has grown considerably over the past 30 years. It has a well-developed trade and service industry.

Kolvereid is home to the municipality's culture centre, comprising a stage and a cinema, a sports hall, as well as outdoor sports facilities. Kolvereid Church dates back to 1874; the church was designed by architect Jacob Wilhelm Nordan. It was built of wood and has 350 seats.

== Notable people ==
- Betzy Holter (1893–1979), an actress
