= Steinar Aspli =

Norwegian politician

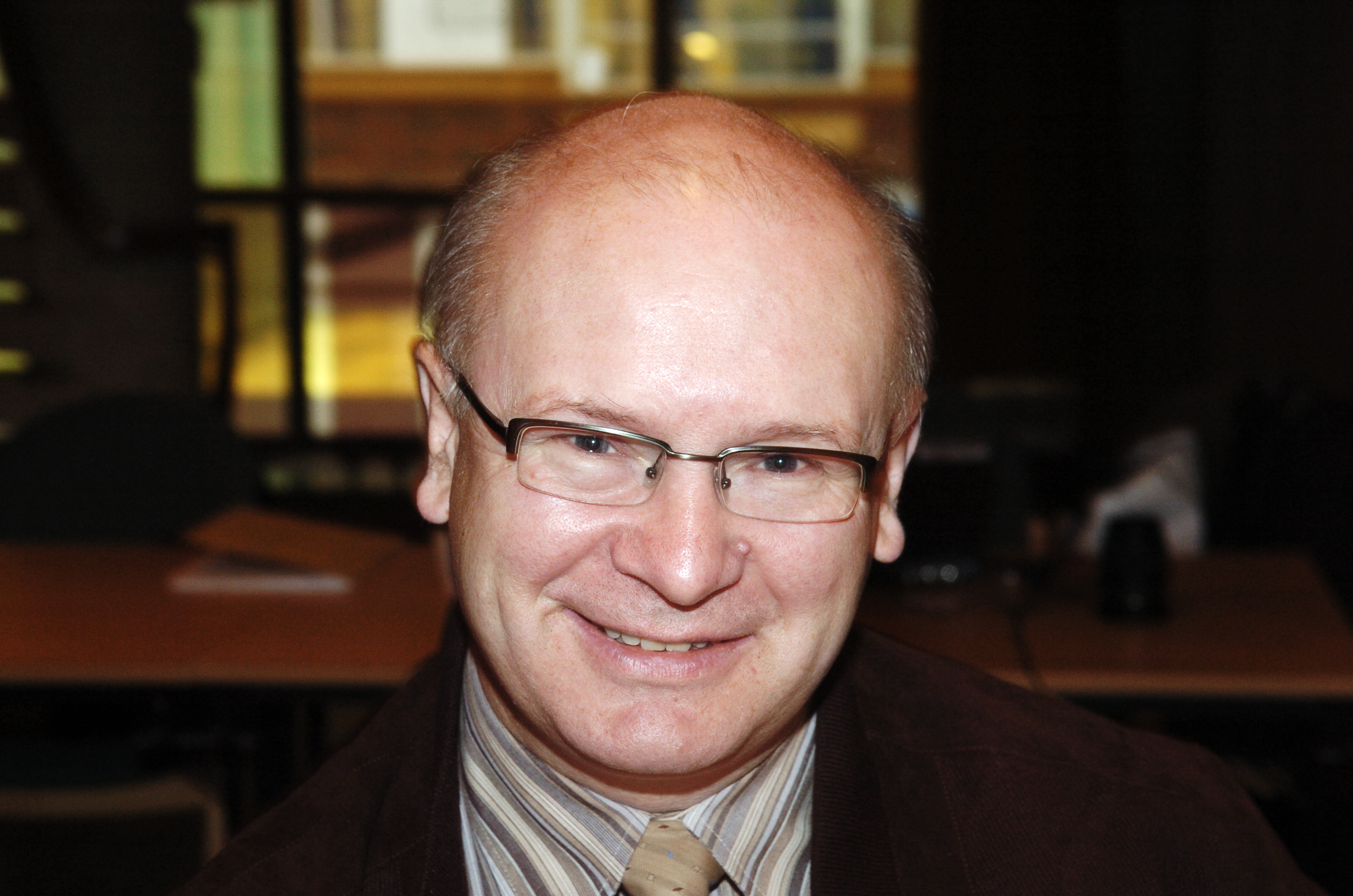
Steinar Aspli

Steinar Aspli (born 14 December 1957) is a Norwegian politician for the Centre Party.

He served as a deputy representative to the Norwegian Parliament from Nord-Trøndelag during the term 1997–2001. On the local level he was mayor of Nærøy Municipality from 1999 to 2019.

Since 2005 he is chairman of the board of the Nord-Trøndelag Health Trust. He succeeded Lars Peder Brekk.
