= Gravvika =

Village in Nærøysund Municipality, Norway

Gravvika Gravika
- Village
- Interactive map of Gravvika
- Location within Trøndelag Location within Norway
- Coordinates: 64.9895°N 11.7712°E
- Country: Norway
- Region: Central Norway
- County: Trøndelag
- District: Namdalen
- Municipality: Nærøysund Municipality
- Elevation: 70 m (230 ft)
- Time zone: UTC+01:00 (CET)
  - Summer (DST): UTC+02:00 (CEST)
- Post Code: 7990 Naustbukta

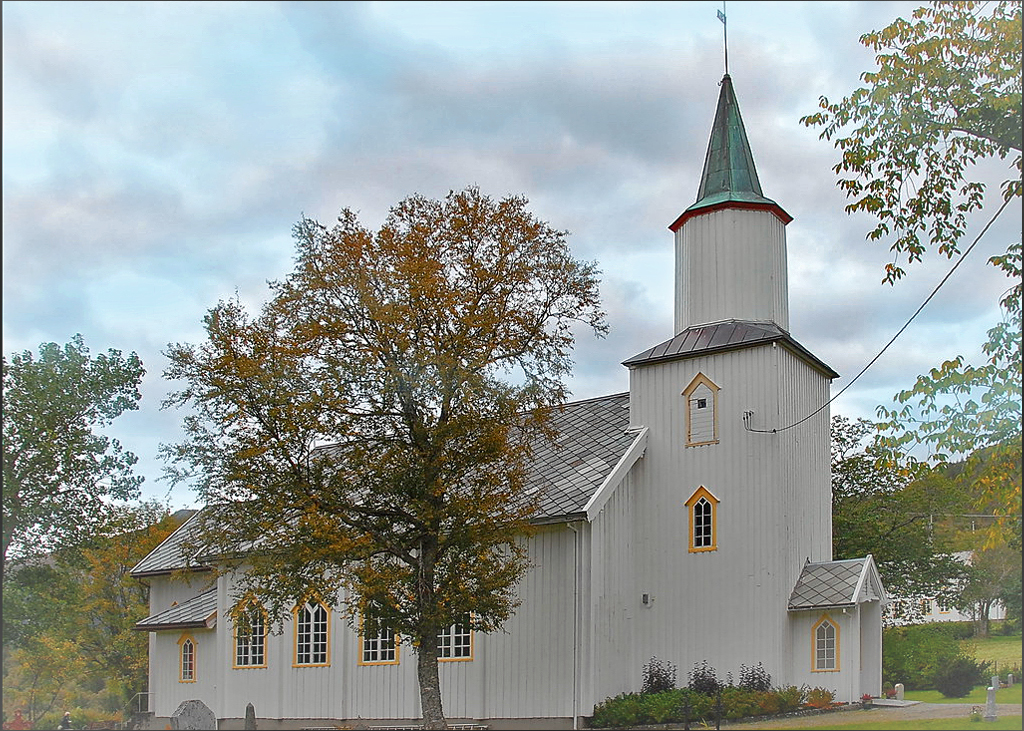
Gravvik kirke (Gravvik Church)

Gravvika is a village in Nærøysund Municipality in Trøndelag county, Norway. The village is located on an isthmus between the Årsetfjorden and the Eiterfjorden. Gravvika is about 20 kilometres (12 mi) north of the town of Kolvereid. Gravvik Church is located in the village.

Agriculture and fishing have traditionally been the primary industries in Gravvik. Today, fish farms, including both salmon and halibut, as well as shellfish are local important industries.

The village was the administrative centre of the old Gravvik Municipality from 1909 until its dissolution in 1964.

== Fingalshulen ==
Fingalshulen is a cave and archaeological site at Gravvika. The 123-metre (404 ft) deep cave has a maximum height in the cave of 20 metres (66 ft) and maximum width of 15 metres (49 ft). It contains 47 cave paintings, including of human figures and some animal shapes. The paintings have been estimated to date back 3000 years. Fingalshulen was first described in the 1800s, but was archaeologically investigated in 1960s. The cave was mapped by the Science Museum in Trondheim in 1962 and 1963. The cave has been the subject of major scientific studies, most recently during 2004. Fingalshulen is currently closed to the public.
