= Steine, Trøndelag =

Village in Nærøysund Municipality, Norway

Steine Stein
- Village
- Interactive map of Steine
- Location within Trøndelag Location within Norway
- Coordinates: 64.7485°N 11.2942°E
- Country: Norway
- Region: Central Norway
- County: Trøndelag
- District: Namdalen
- Municipality: Nærøysund Municipality
- Elevation: 19 m (62 ft)
- Time zone: UTC+01:00 (CET)
  - Summer (DST): UTC+02:00 (CEST)
- Post Code: 7950 Abelvær

Steine is a village in Nærøysund Municipality in Trøndelag county, Norway. The village is located along the Foldafjord, just northeast of the island village of Abelvær. The Steine Chapel is located here, and it serves this area of the municipality.

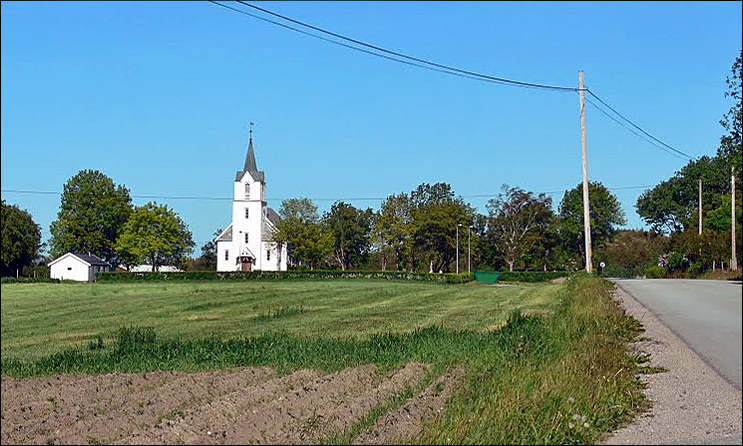
