= Storvatnet (Nærøy) =

Lake in Trøndelag, Norway

Storvatnet (Norwegian) Stoerre-jaevrie (Southern Sami)
- Interactive map of the lake
- Location: Nærøysund Municipality, Trøndelag
- Coordinates: 64.8773°N 12.1092°E
- Basin countries: Norway
- Max. length: 10 kilometres (6.2 mi)
- Max. width: 1.5 kilometres (0.93 mi)
- Surface area: 8.32 km^{2} (3.21 sq mi)
- Shore length^{1}: 30.5 kilometres (19.0 mi)
- Surface elevation: 117 metres (384 ft)
- References: NVE
- ^{1} Shore length is not a well-defined measure.

Storvatnet (Norwegian) or Stoerre-jaevrie (Southern Sami) is a lake in Nærøysund Municipality in Trøndelag county, Norway. The 8.32-square-kilometre (3.21 sq mi) lake about 10 kilometres (6.2 mi) northeast of the village of Salsbruket.

== See also ==
- List of lakes in Norway
