= Mjøsundvatnet =

Lake in Trøndelag, Norway

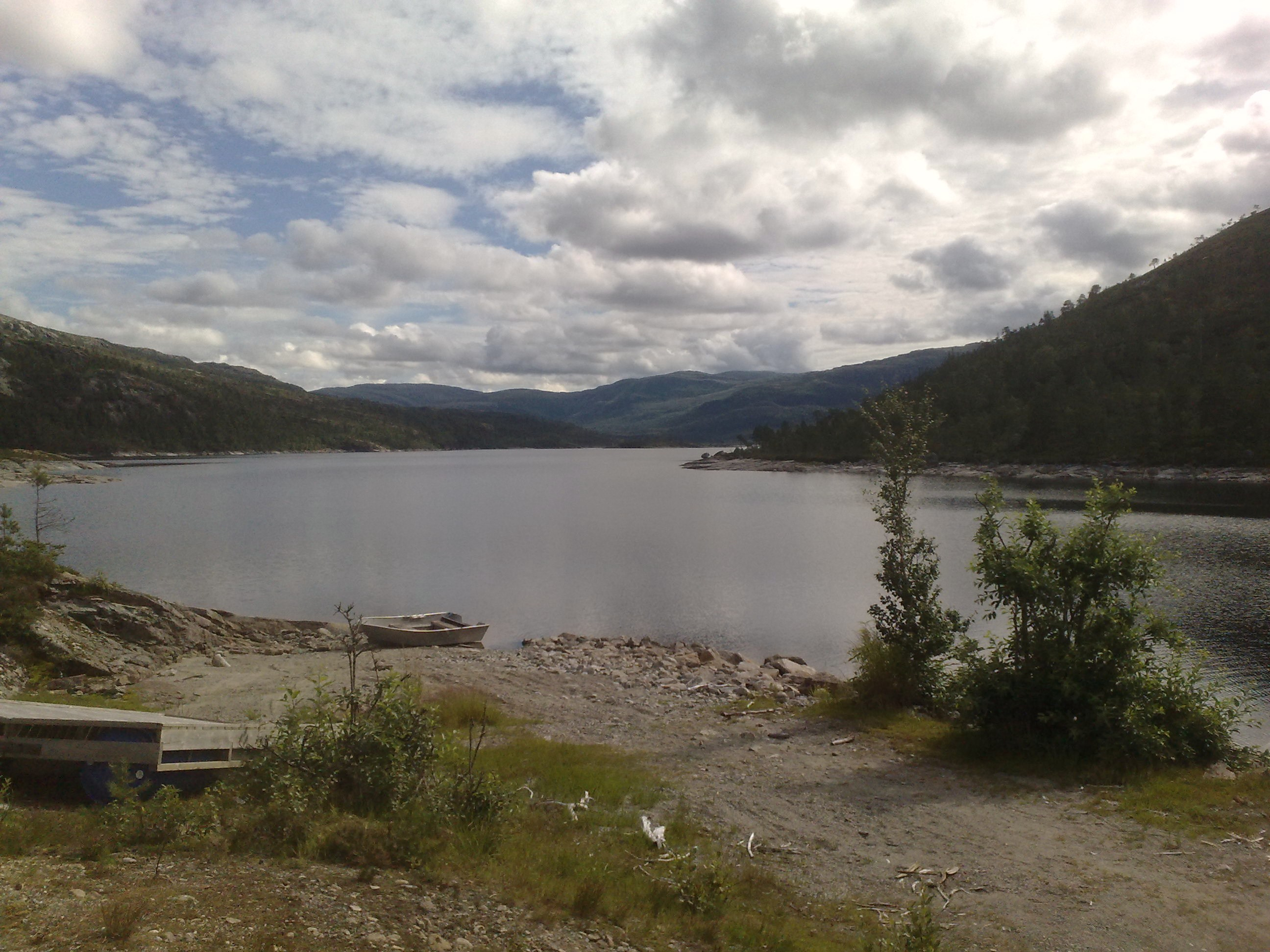
- Interactive map of the lake
- Location: Namsos and Nærøysund, Trøndelag
- Coordinates: 64.8136°N 12.1148°E
- Basin countries: Norway
- Max. length: 10 kilometres (6.2 mi)
- Max. width: 1.5 kilometres (0.93 mi)
- Surface area: 8.76 km^{2} (3.38 sq mi)
- Shore length^{1}: 31.6 kilometres (19.6 mi)
- Surface elevation: 150 metres (490 ft)
- References: NVE
- ^{1} Shore length is not a well-defined measure.

Mjøsundvatnet is a lake in Namsos Municipality and Nærøysund Municipality in Trøndelag county, Norway. The 8.76-square-kilometre (3.38 sq mi) lake lies in the far northern part of Namsos, and it extends a short distance into Nærøysund on both ends. The lake is accessible by road from Salsbruket in Nærøysund Municipality.

== See also ==
- List of lakes in Norway
