= Laugen =

Laugen may refer to:

- HNoMS Laugen, Norwegian naval vessel
- Laugen-Melaun culture, archaeological culture of Europe
