= Steine Chapel =

Church in Trøndelag, Norway

- Steine kapell
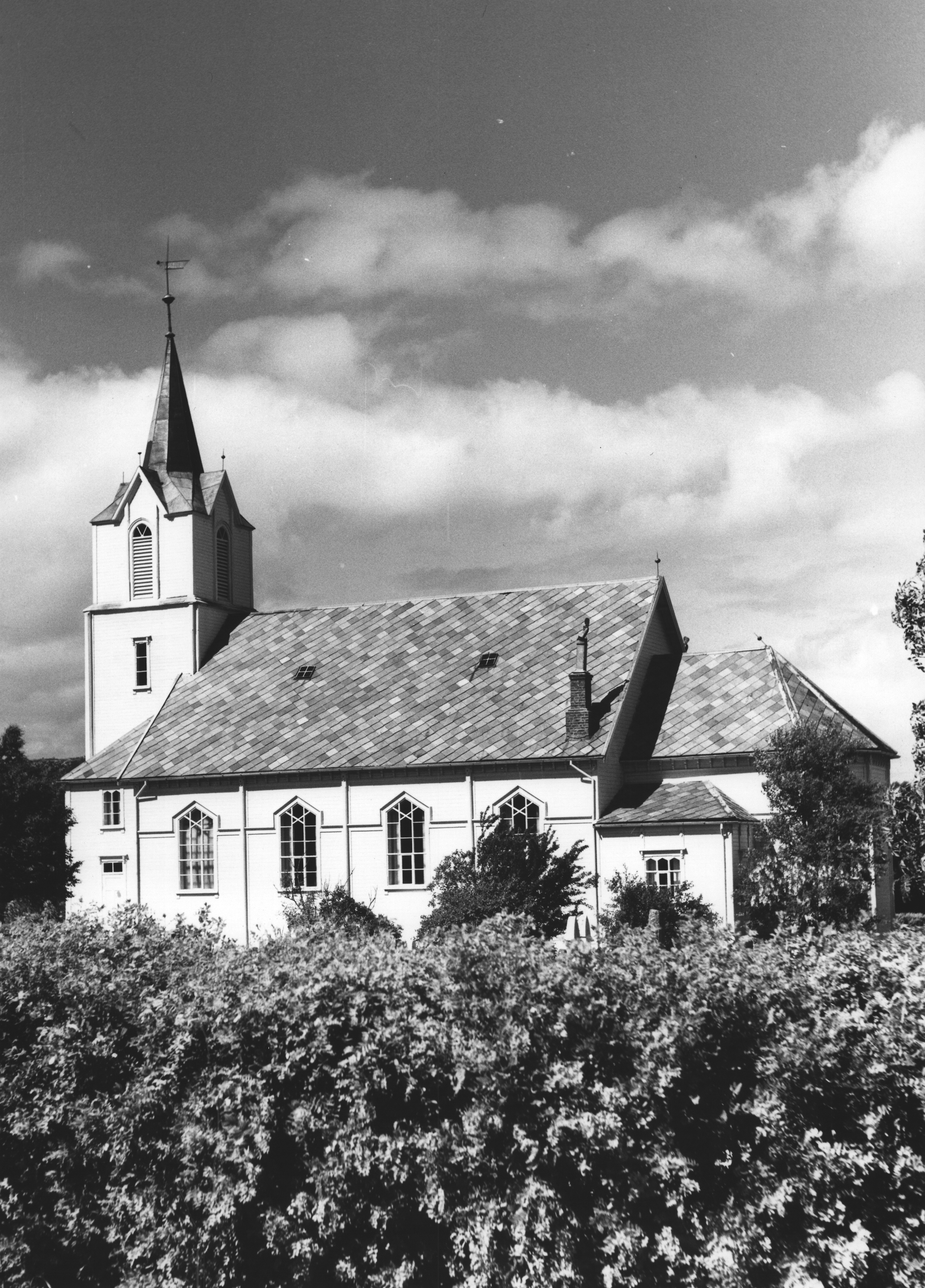
- View of the church
- Steine Chapel
- 64.75501007°N 11.30573040°E
- Location: Nærøysund Municipality, Trøndelag
- Country: Norway
- Denomination: Church of Norway
- Churchmanship: Evangelical Lutheran

History
- Status: Parish church
- Founded: 1911
- Consecrated: 14 Dec 1911

Architecture
- Functional status: Active
- Architect: Ole Scheistrøen
- Architectural type: Long church
- Completed: 1911 (115 years ago)

Specifications
- Capacity: 300
- Materials: Wood

Administration
- Diocese: Nidaros bispedømme
- Deanery: Namdal prosti
- Parish: Nærøy
- Norwegian Cultural Heritage Site
- Type: Church
- Status: Not protected
- ID: 85564

Steine Chapel (Norwegian: Steine kapell) is a parish church of the Church of Norway in Nærøysund Municipality in Trøndelag county, Norway. It is located in the village of Steine. It is one of the churches for the Nærøy parish which is part of the Namdal prosti (deanery) in the Diocese of Nidaros. The white, wooden church was built in a long church style in 1911 using plans drawn up by the architect Ole Scheistrøen. The church seats about 300 people.

== History ==
On 6 July 1905, permission was granted to build a cemetery on Steine. This new cemetery was consecrated by the parish priest on 8 September 1907. Then a royal resolution from 9 December 1910 granted permission to build a chapel on the site using designs Ole Scheistrøen. The chapel was built by Tobias Faksdal in the summer of 1911 and it was then consecrated by the bishop on 14 December 1911.

== See also ==
- List of churches in Nidaros
