= Torstad Chapel =

Church in Trøndelag, Norway

- Torstad kapell
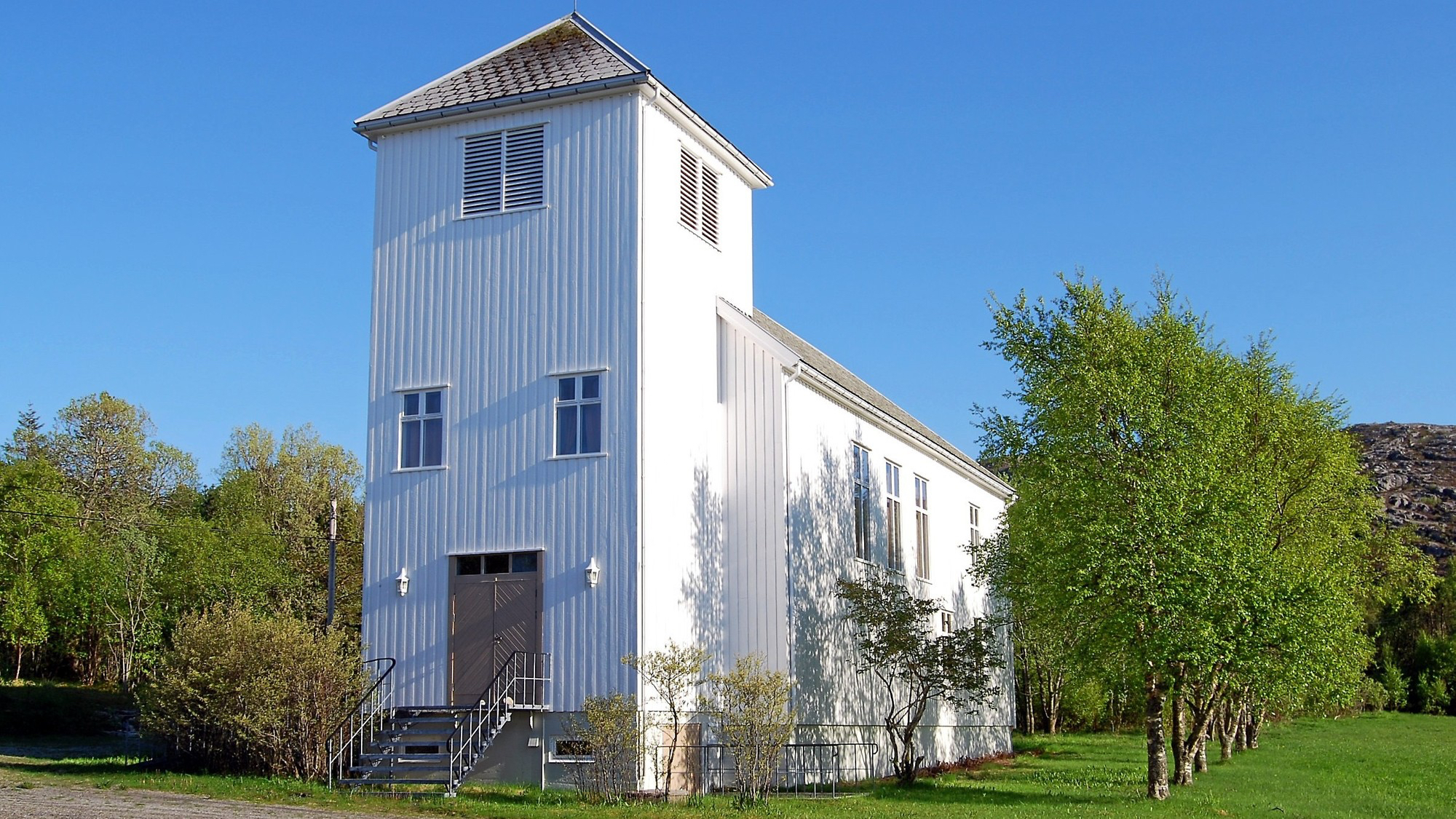
- View of the chapel
- Torstad Chapel
- 64.89469602°N 11.36166841°E
- Location: Nærøysund Municipality, Trøndelag
- Country: Norway
- Denomination: Church of Norway
- Churchmanship: Evangelical Lutheran

History
- Status: Chapel
- Founded: 1936
- Consecrated: 1936

Architecture
- Functional status: Active
- Architect: Arne Sørvig
- Architectural type: Rectangular
- Completed: 1936 (90 years ago)

Specifications
- Capacity: 120
- Materials: Wood

Administration
- Diocese: Nidaros bispedømme
- Deanery: Namdal prosti
- Parish: Nærøy
- Norwegian Cultural Heritage Site
- Type: Church
- Status: Not protected
- ID: 85653

Torstad Chapel (Norwegian: Torstad kapell) is a chapel of the Church of Norway in Nærøysund Municipality in Trøndelag county, Norway. It is located in the village of Torstad. It is an annex chapel for the Nærøy parish which is part of the Namdal prosti (deanery) in the Diocese of Nidaros. The wooden church was built in a rectangular style in 1936 using plans drawn up by the architect Arne Sørvig. The church seats about 120 people.

== History ==
The first chapel in Torstad was built in 1936 and it was used as a chapel and also as a school. In 1976, the building was converted into just a chapel.

== See also ==
- List of churches in Nidaros
