= Salsbruket Chapel =

Church in Trøndelag, Norway

- Salsbruket kapell
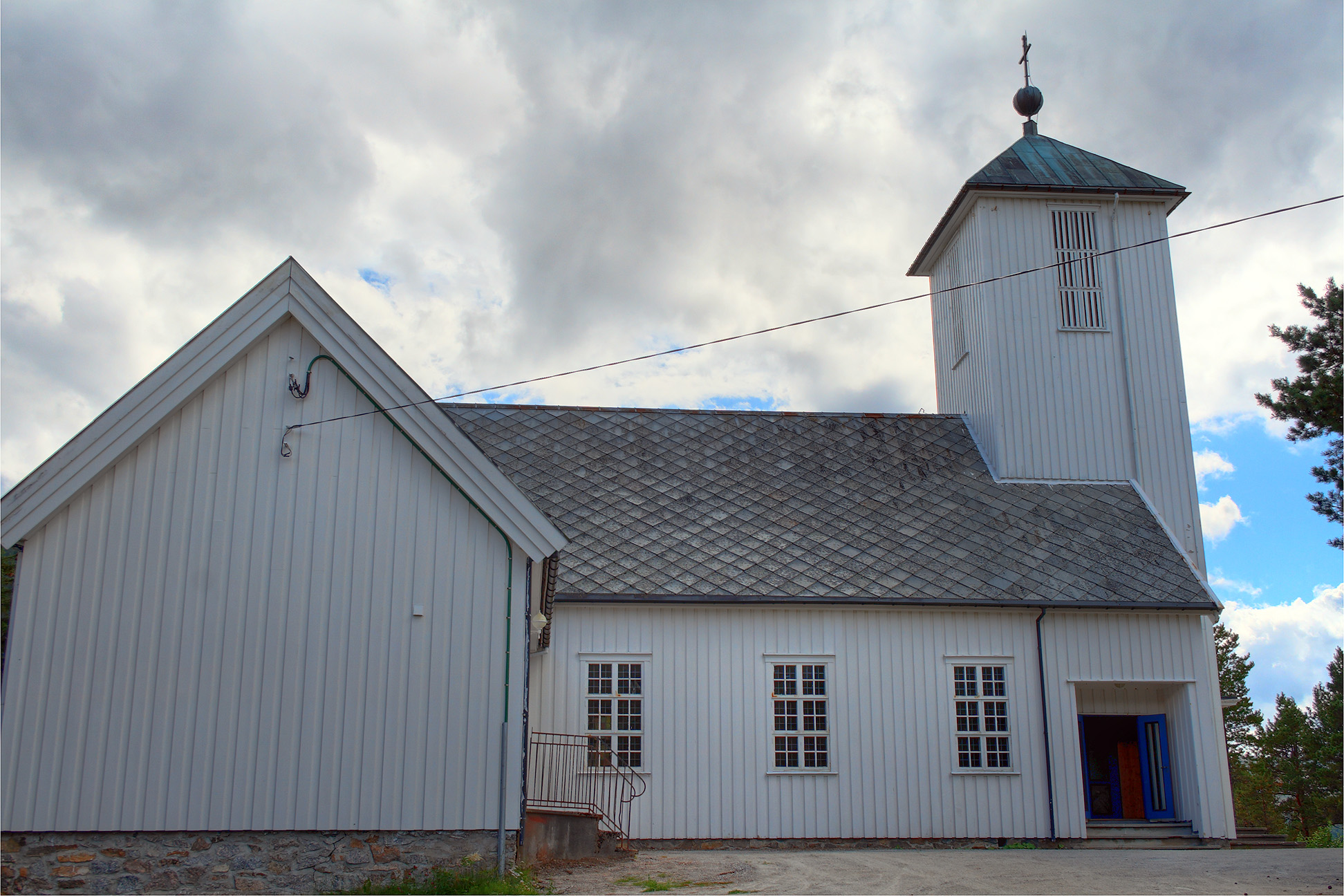
- View of the church
- Salsbruket Chapel
- 64.79846403°N 11.844710112°E
- Location: Nærøysund Municipality, Trøndelag
- Country: Norway
- Denomination: Church of Norway
- Churchmanship: Evangelical Lutheran

History
- Status: Parish church
- Founded: 1950
- Consecrated: 27 August 1950

Architecture
- Functional status: Active
- Architect: Arne Sørvig
- Architectural type: Long church
- Completed: 1950 (76 years ago)

Specifications
- Capacity: 260
- Materials: Wood

Administration
- Diocese: Nidaros bispedømme
- Deanery: Namdal prosti
- Parish: Nærøy
- Norwegian Cultural Heritage Site
- Type: Church
- Status: Not protected
- ID: 85363

Salsbruket Chapel (Norwegian: Salsbruket kapell) is a parish church of the Church of Norway in Nærøysund Municipality in Trøndelag county, Norway. It is located in the village of Salsbruket. It is one of the churches for the Nærøy parish which is part of the Namdal prosti (deanery) in the Diocese of Nidaros. The white, wooden church was built in a long church style in 1950 using plans drawn up by the architect Arne Sørvig. The church seats about 260 people. The chapel was consecrated on 27 August 1950 by Bishop Arne Fjellbu.

== See also ==
- List of churches in Nidaros
