= Foldereid Church =

Church in Trøndelag, Norway

- Foldereid kirke
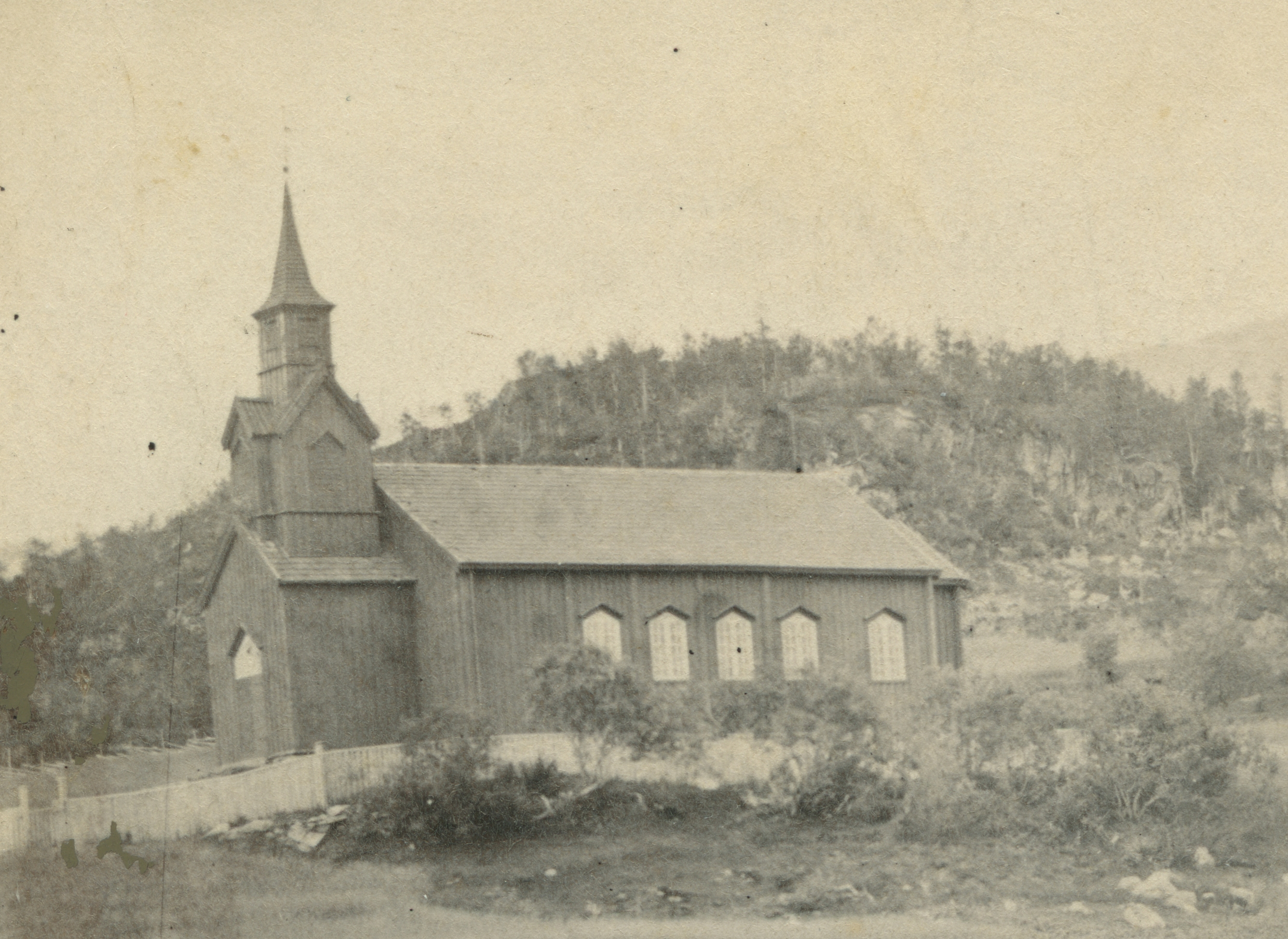
- View of the church
- Foldereid Church
- 64.96289798°N 12.178510048°E
- Location: Nærøysund Municipality, Trøndelag
- Country: Norway
- Denomination: Church of Norway
- Churchmanship: Evangelical Lutheran

History
- Status: Parish church
- Founded: c. 14th century
- Consecrated: 1864

Architecture
- Functional status: Active
- Architect: Christian Heinrich Grosch
- Architectural type: Long church
- Completed: 1863 (163 years ago)

Specifications
- Capacity: 280
- Materials: Wood

Administration
- Diocese: Nidaros bispedømme
- Deanery: Namdal prosti
- Parish: Nærøy
- Norwegian Cultural Heritage Site
- Type: Church
- Status: Not protected
- ID: 84174

Foldereid Church (Norwegian: Foldereid kirke) is a parish church of the Church of Norway in Nærøysund Municipality in Trøndelag county, Norway. It is located in the village of Foldereid. It is one of the churches for the Nærøy parish which is part of the Namdal prosti (deanery) in the Diocese of Nidaros. The white, wooden church was built in a long church style in 1863 using plans drawn up by the architect Christian Heinrich Grosch. The church seats about 280 people.

== History ==
The earliest existing historical records of the church date back to the year 1589, but it was not new that year. The first church here was built about 125 metres (410 ft) southwest of the present church site and it was likely a stave church that was built in the Middle Ages. Originally, the church was an annex church for the main Nærøy Church and the priest would visit Foldereid approximately once a month. In 1675, the old church was torn down and replaced with a new church on the same site. By the mid-1800s, the old wooden church was found to be too small for the parish, so a new, larger church was built about 125 metres (410 ft) to the northeast (closer to the road). After the new church was consecrated in 1864, the old church was torn down.

== See also ==
- List of churches in Nidaros
