= Foldereid =

Village in Nærøysund Municipality, Norway

- Village
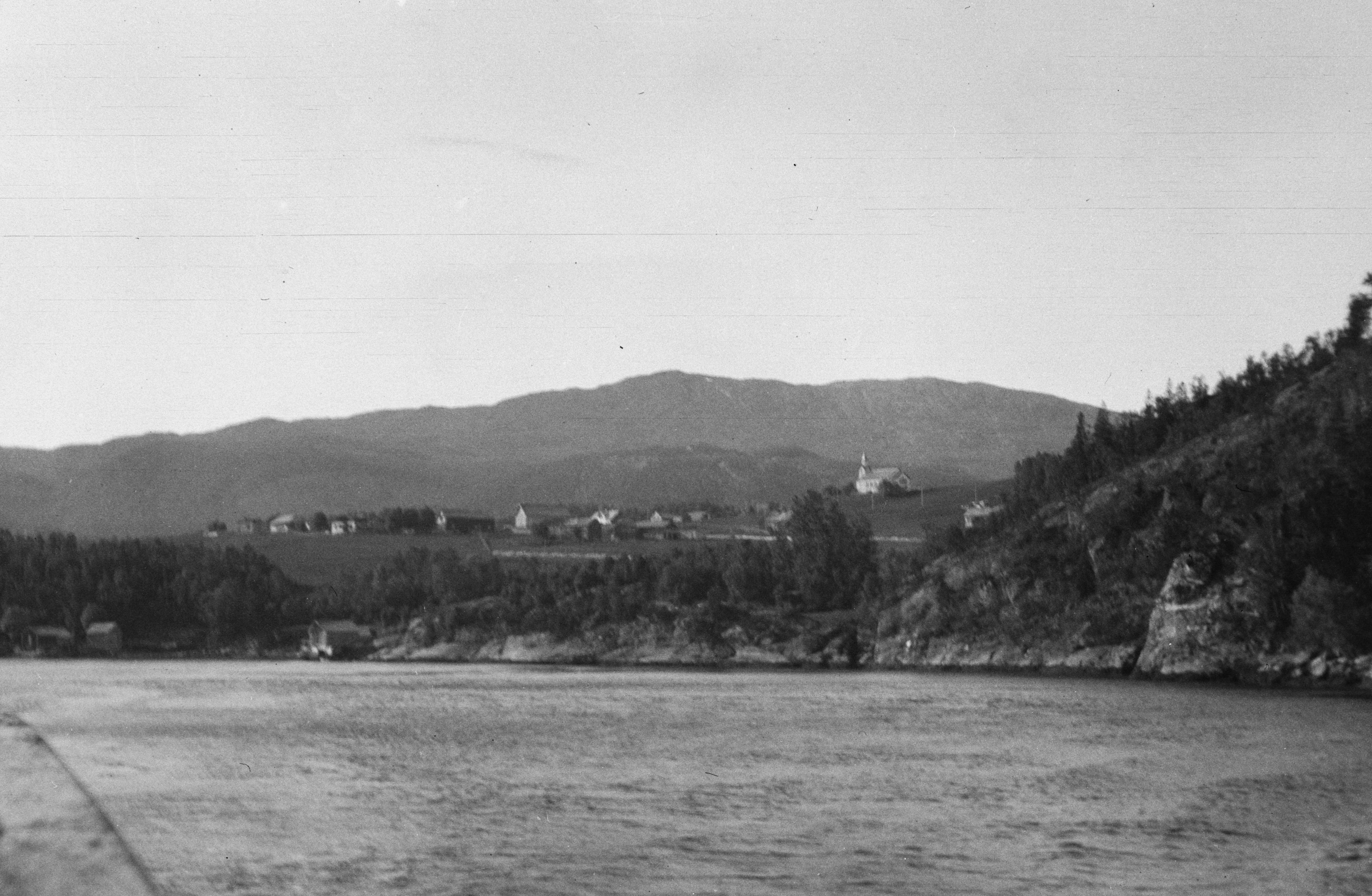
- View of the village. The church was built in 1863.
- Interactive map of Foldereid
- Location within Trøndelag Location within Norway
- Coordinates: 64.9628°N 12.1777°E
- Country: Norway
- Region: Central Norway
- County: Trøndelag
- District: Namdalen
- Municipality: Nærøysund Municipality
- Elevation: 55 m (180 ft)
- Time zone: UTC+01:00 (CET)
  - Summer (DST): UTC+02:00 (CEST)
- Post Code: 7985 Foldereid

Foldereid is a village in Nærøysund Municipality in Trøndelag county, Norway. The village is located near the inner part of the Folda fjord, the Innerfolda, just 1.5 kilometres (0.93 mi) south of the border with Nordland county. The Norwegian County Road 770 and the Norwegian County Road 17 both run through the village and the Folda Bridge (over the Foldafjord) lies just east of the village. Foldereid Church is located in the village.

The village was the administrative centre of the old Foldereid Municipality that existed from 1886 until 1964.
