= Nærøysund Municipality =

Municipality in Trøndelag, Norway

Nærøysund Municipality Nærøysund kommune
- Municipality
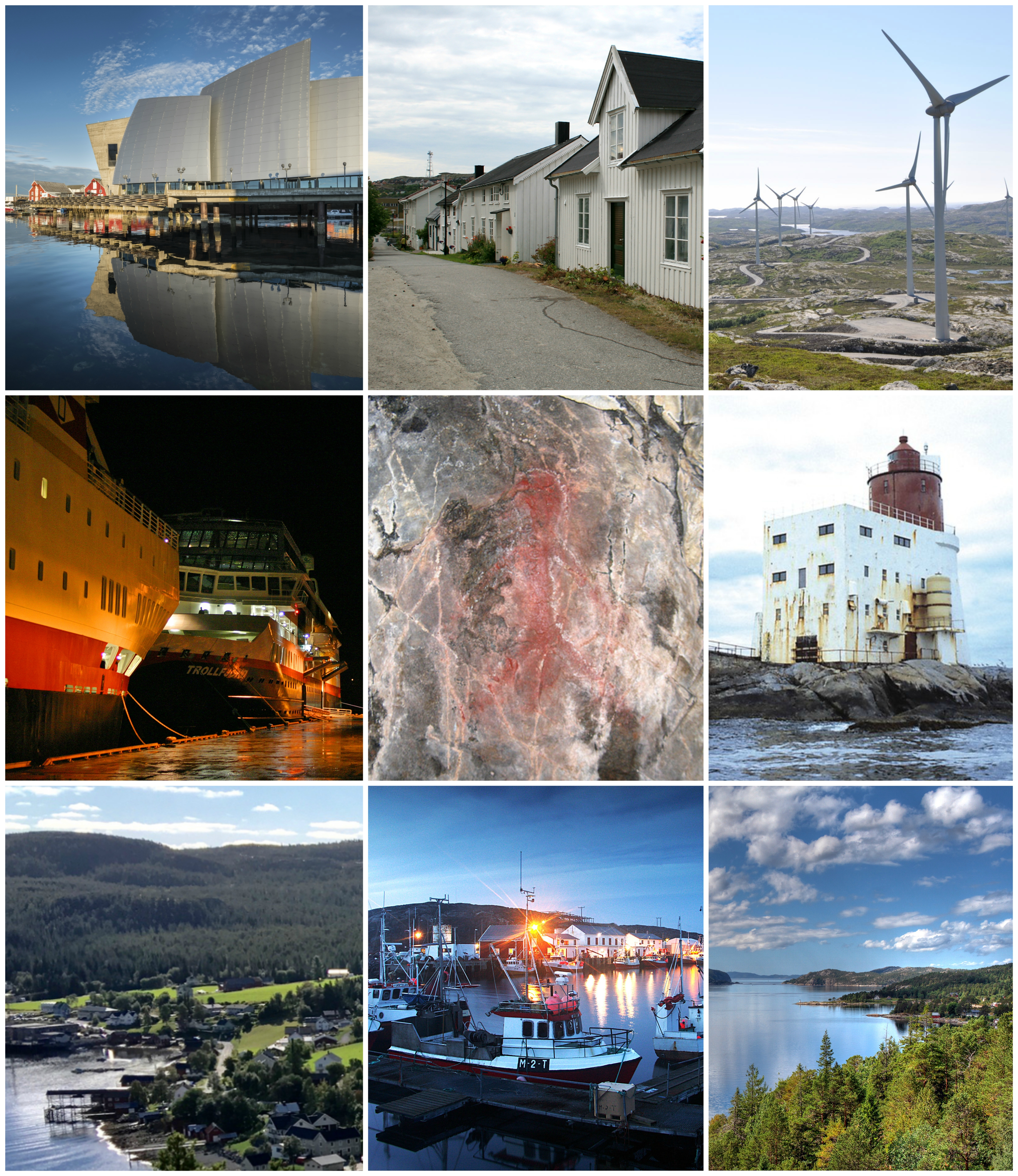

- Coat of arms

- Trøndelag within Norway

- Nærøysund within Trøndelag
- Coordinates: 64.8393°N 11.4608°E
- Country: Norway
- County: Trøndelag
- District: Namdalen
- Established: 1 Jan 2020
  - Preceded by: Vikna Municipality and Nærøy Municipality
- Administrative centre: Kolvereid and Rørvik

Government
  - Mayor (2020): Amund Hellesø (Ap)

Area
  - Total: 1,346.20 km^{2} (519.77 sq mi)
  - Land: 1,286.35 km^{2} (496.66 sq mi)
  - Water: 59.85 km^{2} (23.11 sq mi) 4.4%
  - Rank: #70 in Norway
- Highest elevation: 873.58 m (2,866.1 ft)

Population (2024)
  - Total: 9,968
  - Rank: #114 in Norway
  - Density: 7.4/km^{2} (19/sq mi)
  - Change (10 years): ▲ +6.2%
- Demonym(s): Nærøysunding; Nærøysunder

Official language
  - Norwegian form: Neutral
- Time zone: UTC+01:00 (CET)
  - Summer (DST): UTC+02:00 (CEST)
- ISO 3166 code: NO-5060
- Website: Official website

Nærøysund is a municipality in Trøndelag county, Norway. It is located in the traditional district of Namdalen. The municipality was established on 1 January 2020 after the merger of the old Vikna Municipality and Nærøy Municipality. The municipality is unique in that it has two equal administrative centres: Kolvereid and Rørvik. The other main population centres of Nærøysund include Abelvær, Foldereid, Gravvika, Ottersøya, Salsbruket, Steine, Torstad, Austafjord, Ramstad, Garstad, and Valøya.

The 1,346-square-kilometre (520 sq mi) municipality is the 70th largest by area out of the 357 municipalities in Norway. Nærøysund Municipality is the 114th most populous municipality in Norway with a population of 9,968. The municipality's population density is 7.4 inhabitants per square kilometre (19/sq mi) and its population has increased by 6.2% over the previous 10-year period.

== General information ==
=== Municipal history ===
The municipality was established on 1 January 2020 when the neighboring Nærøy Municipality and Vikna Municipality were merged. The small Lund area of Nærøy Municipality was not part of the merger, it instead was merged with the large Namsos Municipality to the south on the same date. The merger came about because on 8 June 2017, the Norwegian Parliament, the Storting, voted to merge Leka Municipality, Vikna Municipality, Nærøy Municipality, and Bindal Municipality to form one, large municipality effective 1 January 2020. Leka Municipality and Bindal Municipality both rejected the merger, but Vikna Municipality and Nærøy Municipality agreed to the merger so it was carried out in 2020.

=== Name ===
The municipality is named after the Nærøysundet strait which is located in the municipality. The strait is named after the nearby island Nærøya (Old Norse: Njarðøy). The first element is maybe the stem form of the name of the Norse god Njord (but it is suspicious that it is not in the genitive case). The last element is øy which means "island".

=== Coat of arms ===
The coat of arms was approved for use starting on 1 January 2020. The blazon is "Argent, two bars wavy intertwined vert and azure". This means the arms have a field (background) that has a tincture of argent which means it is commonly colored white, but if it is made out of metal, then silver is used. The charge is two intertwined stripes, one green and one blue. The green symbolizes the land and agriculture while the blue symbolizes the sea and fishing industry. Both are intertwined like a rope to symbolize unity and the two old municipalities becoming one. The municipal flag has the same design as the coat of arms.

=== Churches ===
The Church of Norway had two parishes (sokn) within Nærøysund Municipality. It is part of the Namdal prosti (deanery) in the Diocese of Nidaros.

Churches in Nærøysund Municipality
Parish (sokn)	Church name	Location of the church	Year built
Nærøy	Foldereid Church	Foldereid	1863
Nærøy	Gravvik Church	Gravvika	1875
Nærøy	Kolvereid Church	Kolvereid	1874
Nærøy	Lundring Church	Lundring	1885
Nærøy	Salsbruket Chapel	Salsbruket	1950
Nærøy	Steine Chapel	Steine	1911
Nærøy	Torstad Chapel	Torstad	1936
Vikna	Garstad Church	Garstad	1856
Vikna	Rørvik Church	Rørvik	1896
Vikna	Valøy Chapel	Valøya	1972

== Government ==
Nærøysund Municipality is responsible for primary education (through 10th grade), outpatient health services, senior citizen services, welfare and other social services, zoning, economic development, and municipal roads and utilities. The municipality is governed by a municipal council of directly elected representatives. The mayor is indirectly elected by a vote of the municipal council. The municipality is under the jurisdiction of the Trøndelag District Court and the Frostating Court of Appeal.

Municipal waste management has since 1993 been handled by the inter-municipal Midtre Namdal Avfallsselskap, with ReTrans Midt handling waste collection since 2018.

=== Mayors ===
The mayor (Norwegian: ordfører) of Nærøysund Municipality is the political leader of the municipality and the chairperson of the municipal council. Here is a list of people who have held this position:

- 2020–present: Amund Hellesø (Ap)

=== Municipal council ===
The municipal council (Kommunestyre) of Nærøysund Municipality is made up of 27 representatives that are elected to four year terms. The tables below show the current and historical composition of the council by political party.

Nærøysund kommunestyre 2023–2027
Party name (in Norwegian)	Number of representatives
Labour Party (Arbeiderpartiet)	7
Progress Party (Fremskrittspartiet)	5
Conservative Party (Høyre)	4
Christian Democratic Party (Kristelig Folkeparti)	1
Centre Party (Senterpartiet)	7
Socialist Left Party (Sosialistisk Venstreparti)	1
Liberal Party (Venstre)	2
Total number of members:	27

Nærøysund kommunestyre 2020–2023
Party name (in Norwegian)	Number of representatives
Labour Party (Arbeiderpartiet)	14
Progress Party (Fremskrittspartiet)	4
Green Party (Miljøpartiet De Grønne)	1
Conservative Party (Høyre)	5
Christian Democratic Party (Kristelig Folkeparti)	1
Centre Party (Senterpartiet)	9
Socialist Left Party (Sosialistisk Venstreparti)	1
Liberal Party (Venstre)	2
Total number of members:	37
Note: On 1 January 2020, Nærøysund Municipality was created by the merger of Vikna Municipality and Nærøy Municipality.

== Geography and climate ==
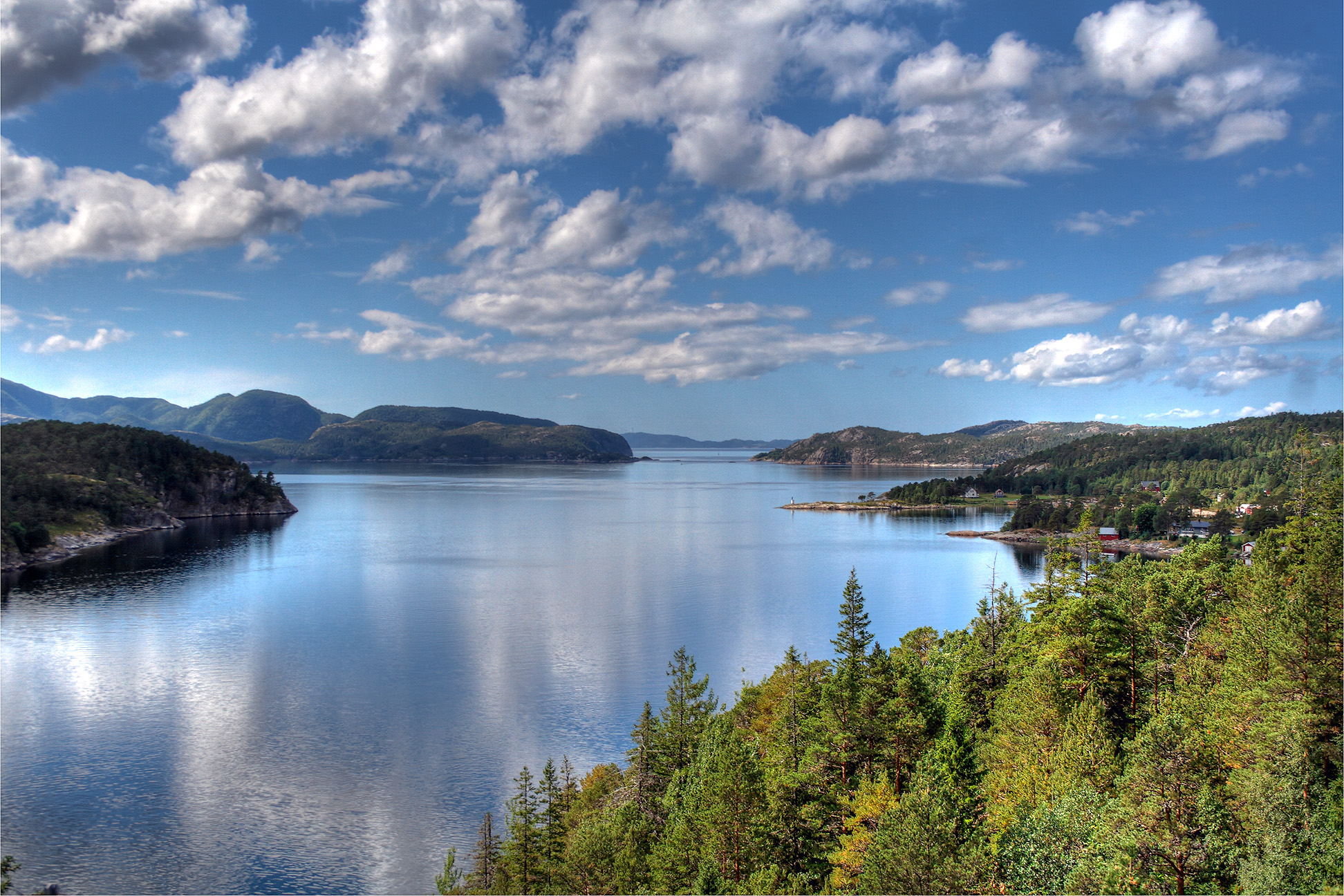
Fjord near Salsbruket.

Nærøysund is named after the Nærøysundet strait between the islands of Inner-Vikna, Marøya, Nærøya and the mainland. This has been an important strait for sea travel along the coast at least since the Viking Age. The western part of the municipality consists of an archipelago with almost 6,000 islands and islets going west into the Norwegian Sea, with many straits between the islands. There are three main islands, Inner-Vikna, Mellom-Vikna and Ytter-Vikna, which all three are connected to the mainland by bridges. The largest town, Rørvik, with the main harbor, is situated on Inner-Vikna facing the mainland. The mainland part of the municipality is more rugged, with mountains up to 873 meter ASL, but also of some lowland areas around the town of Kolvereid. The highest point in the municipality is the 873.58-metre (2,866.1 ft) tall mountain Fuglstadfjellet, on the border with Bindal Municipality. The Sør-Gjæslingan islands were once home to thriving fishing village that was abandoned in the 1970s. The Nordøyan islands and the Nordøyan Lighthouse are located at the western end of the Folda fjord.

Coastal areas in Nærøysund has an oceanic climate (Cfb) as autumn and winter are the wettest seasons, even if the winter temperature is close to a humid continental climate. There are two official weather stations recording temperature in the municipality, one at Rørvik Airport at Inner-Vikna island, the other at Nordøyan Lighthouse further southwest on a smaller island. Nordøyan is warmer in winter with coldest monthly mean 1.4 °C (34.5 °F), but is cooler in summer compared to Rørvik. The all-time low at Rørvik Airport was recorded in January 2010, and the all-time high 32.9 °C (91.2 °F) was recorded July 27, 2019.

Climate data for Rørvik Airport 1991-2020 (4 m, precipitation Rørvik-Engan, extremes 2002-2025)
Month	Jan	Feb	Mar	Apr	May	Jun	Jul	Aug	Sep	Oct	Nov	Dec	Year
Record high °C (°F)	10.2 (50.4)	10.1 (50.2)	12.9 (55.2)	20.9 (69.6)	27.9 (82.2)	30.5 (86.9)	32.9 (91.2)	29.3 (84.7)	23.8 (74.8)	18.9 (66.0)	13.8 (56.8)	9.6 (49.3)	32.9 (91.2)
Mean daily maximum °C (°F)	2 (36)	2 (36)	4 (39)	7 (45)	11 (52)	14 (57)	17 (63)	17 (63)	14 (57)	9 (48)	5 (41)	2 (36)	9 (48)
Daily mean °C (°F)	0.7 (33.3)	−0.1 (31.8)	1.2 (34.2)	4.5 (40.1)	7.8 (46.0)	10.8 (51.4)	14 (57)	13.7 (56.7)	10.8 (51.4)	6.1 (43.0)	3.4 (38.1)	1.4 (34.5)	6.2 (43.1)
Mean daily minimum °C (°F)	−1 (30)	−2 (28)	−1 (30)	2 (36)	7 (45)	10 (50)	13 (55)	11 (52)	9 (48)	5 (41)	2 (36)	0 (32)	5 (40)
Record low °C (°F)	−19.2 (−2.6)	−18 (0)	−16.9 (1.6)	−8.3 (17.1)	−4.9 (23.2)	−1 (30)	1.9 (35.4)	0 (32)	−3.3 (26.1)	−9.8 (14.4)	−14.5 (5.9)	−16.7 (1.9)	−19.2 (−2.6)
Average precipitation mm (inches)	138 (5.4)	130 (5.1)	115 (4.5)	78 (3.1)	81 (3.2)	101 (4.0)	87 (3.4)	98 (3.9)	145 (5.7)	136 (5.4)	140 (5.5)	160 (6.3)	1,409 (55.5)
Source 1: Norwegian Meteorological Institute
Source 2: Tititudorancea (avg highs/lows)

== Notable people ==
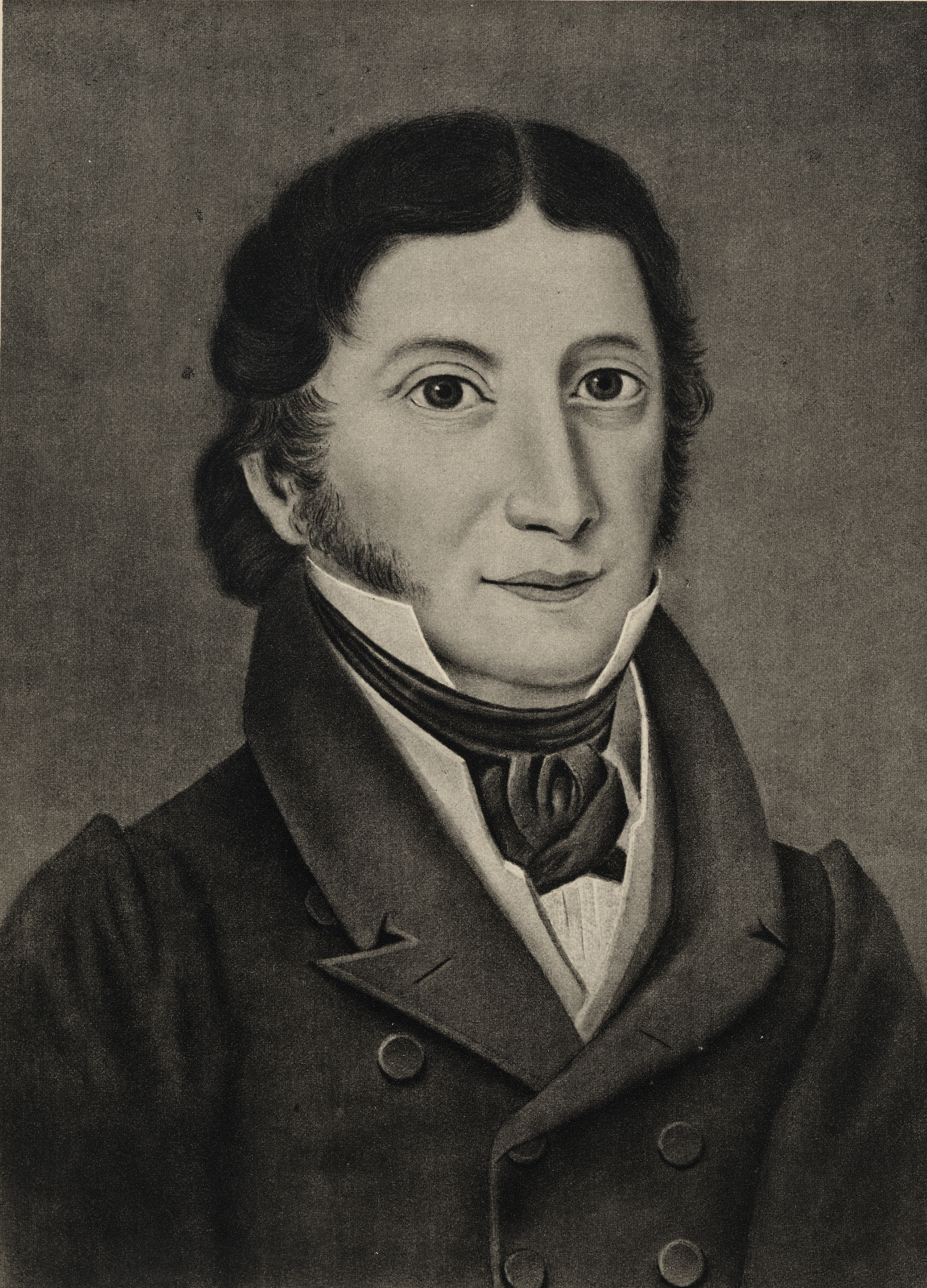
Jacob Liv Borch Sverdrup

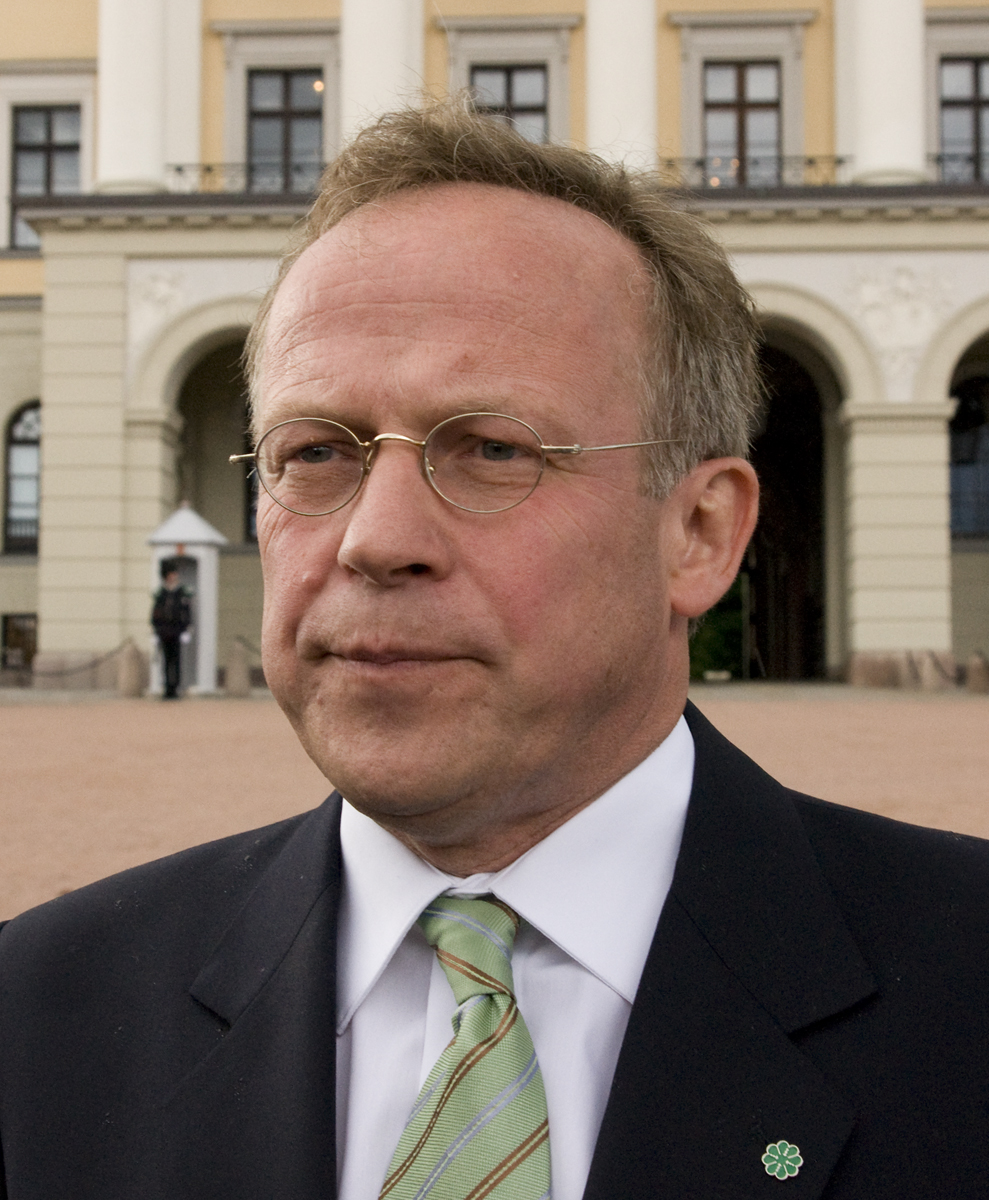
Lars Peder Brekk, 2008

- Jens Schanche (1717 in Ytter-Vikna – 1787), a Norwegian postmaster and postal inspector
- Georg Sverdrup (1770 in Laugen – 1850), a statesman and a president of the Norwegian Constituent Assembly in Eidsvoll
- Jacob Liv Borch Sverdrup (1775 in Laugen – 1841), an educator and farmer
- James M. Wahl (1846 at Storvahl - 1939), a pioneer Norwegian-American settler in South Dakota
- Axel Collett (1880 in Kolvereid – 1968), a landowner, timber merchant, and sawmill owner
- Magnhild Haalke (1885 in Vikna – 1984), a novelist
- Ivar Skjånes (1888 in Kolvereid – 1975), a politician, Mayor of Trondheim, and County Governor of Sør-Trøndelag
- Birger Brandtzæg (1893 in Abelvær – 1971), a merchant and owner of a fishing station
- Brita Collett Paus (1917 in Salsbruket – 1998), a humanitarian and the founder of Fransiskushjelpen
- Paal Bog (born 1919 in Nærøy - 2002), an economist, civil servant, diplomat and Chairman of UNICEF
- Gullow Gjeseth (1937 in Nærøy – 2017), a military officer, commander of the land-based military forces
- Børre Rønningen (born 1949 in Vikna), a Norwegian politician, Mayor of Vikna 1999-2003
- Lars Peder Brekk (born 1955 in Vikna), a Norwegian businessman and politician
- Hilde Stavik (1962 in Kolvereid – 2015), a long-distance runner
