= Folda, Trøndelag =

Fjord in Trøndelag, Norway

Folda
- Interactive map of the fjord
- Location: Trøndelag county, Norway
- Coordinates: 64.6817°N 11.0976°E
- Type: Fjord and Firth
- Basin countries: Norway

Folda is a firth and a fjord in Trøndelag county, Norway. It is located within Flatanger Municipality, Namsos Municipality, and Nærøysund Municipality. The large wide firth is about 50 kilometres (31 mi) long which then narrows into a fjord which is about 75 kilometres (47 mi) long. The narrower fjord part of Folda is often called the Foldfjorden or Innerfolda. Most of the fjord is very narrow, some places with steep cliffs. It has the largest length to width factor among Norway's fjords. The fjord is crossed by the Norwegian County Road 17 road using the Folda Bridge at the village of Foldereid. Spruce forests cover most areas around the fjord. The outer-Folda area is notorious for its rough seas and has been called an "ocean graveyard" (Norwegian: havets kirkegård).

== See also ==
- List of Norwegian fjords
