= MV Amalie =

Ferry built in 1965

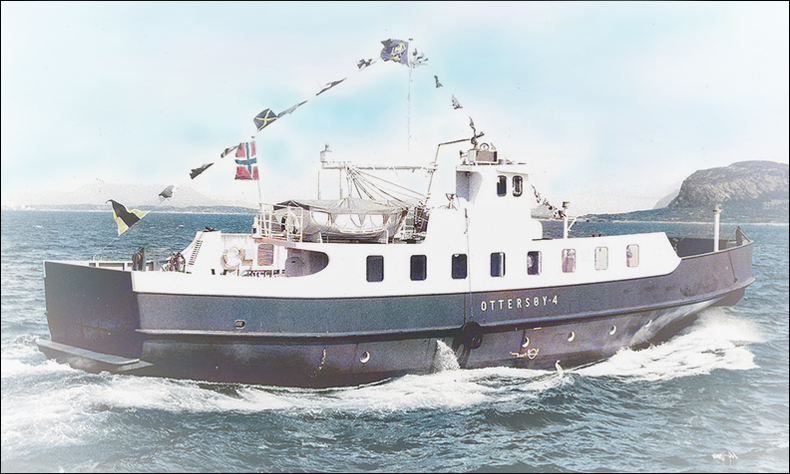

History
- Name: Ottersøy IV (1965–91); Radøy (1991–2004); Amalie (2004–)
- Owner: Helge Fjær (1965–82); Hans Norland (1982–90); Party Stavanger (1990–91); Bergen Nordhordland Rutelag (1991–2002); Wergeland–Halsvik (2002–04); Kihnu Veeteed (2004–)
- Operator: Helge Fjær (1965–82); Austevoll Ferjeselskap (1982–90); Party Stavanger (1990–91); Bergen Nordhordland Rutelag (1991–2002); Wergeland–Halsvik (2002–04); Kihnu Veeteed (2004–)
- Route: Ottersøy–Rørvik (1965–81); Hundvåko–Store Karlsøy (1982–88); Duesund–Masfjordnes (1991–2002); Kihnu–Manilaid (2004–15)
- Builder: Molde Verft
- Yard number: 31U
- Completed: 1965
- Identification: IMO number: 6519132; Call sign: LFCC
- Status: In reserve

General characteristics
- Type: Vehicle and passenger ferry
- Tonnage: 110 GRT
- Length: 26.0 m (85 ft 4 in)
- Beam: 3.2 m (10 ft 6 in)
- Speed: 10 kn (19 km/h; 12 mph)}
- Capacity: 10 passenger car units; 100 passengers

MV Amalie is a roll-on/roll-off passenger and road vehicle ferry owned and operated by Kihnu Veeteed. Built by Molde Verft in 1965, she has a capacity for 10 passenger car equivalents and 100 passengers.

Originally named MF Ottersøy IV, the vessel was ordered by Helge Fjær for the Ottersøy–Rørvik crossing of Nærøysundet. After it was closed in 1981, she was sold and used on a service in Austevoll Municipality. Bergen Nordhordland Rutelag bought her in 1988, renamed her MF Radøy and put her into service on the Duesund–Masfjordnes Ferry. She was sold to Estonia and Kihnu Veeteed in 2004.

== History ==
The vessel was built by Molde Verft in Molde, Norway, and completed in 1965. She was delivered to Helge Fjær, who operated her between Rørvik and Ottersøy across Nærøysundet in Norway. She was named Ottersøy IV as she was the fourth ship to serve on the route, replacing MF Ottersøy III. Traffic rose dramatically during the 1970s, and Ottersøy IV was obviously too small for the route. To keep up capacity, Fjær kept increasing frequency on the route. The Nærøysund Bridge opened on 6 November 1981, making the ferry crossing redunant, and it had its last crossing the same day.

The ship was to Hans Norland of Jørpeland, who leased the ferry to Austevoll Ferjeselskap. There, she ran on the route between Hundvåko and Stora Kalsøy from 1982 to 1988. She was then sold to the company Party Stavanger, who owned her for a year before selling her to Bergen Nordhordland Rutelag (BNR). They renamed her Radøy and put her into the Duesund–Masfjordnes service. She remained the main ferry on the route until 2000, when she was demoted to a reserve ferry. BNR sold her to Wergeland–Halsvik in 2002, who used her as a work ship for two years.

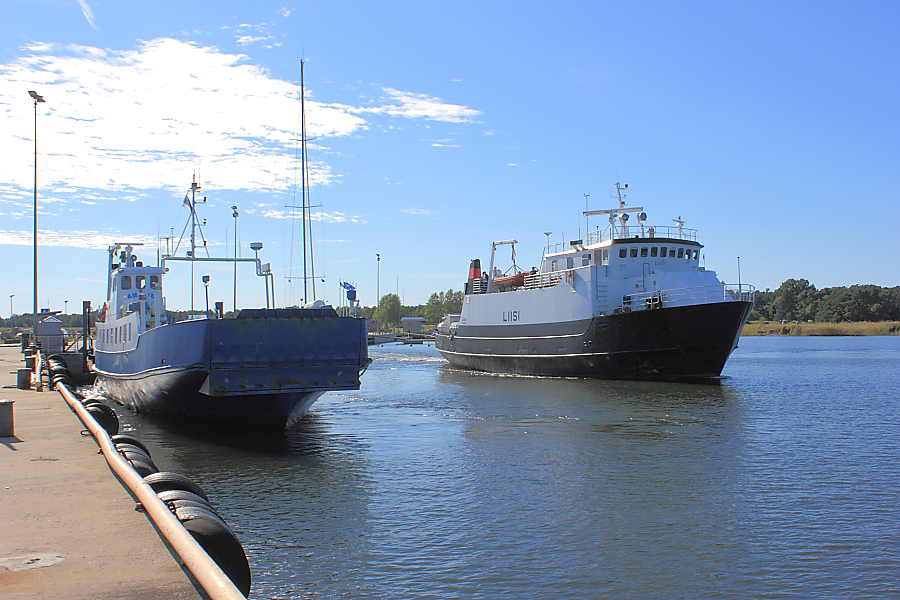
Amalie docked in Lemsi on the island of Kihnu

Radøy was sold to Kihnu Veeteed of Estonia in 2004. There she was put into service on the route between the islands of Kihnu and Manilaid. She was used as the main ferry on the route until 2015.

On the early morning of 10 November 2023, Amalie developed a 10–15 degree list caused by cargo shifting in bad weather. Most of the passengers were evacuated by helicopter and rescue boats. Amalie's crew had attempted to reach Ruhnu before diverting towards Mērsrags in Latvia. The passengers, the vehicles on the car deck, and the ferry itself were unharmed in the incident. Regional minister Madis Kallas said a modern ferry would be procured to provide back-up on services to Ruhnu and the other smaller island routes.

In May 2026, Amalie was introduced by Kihnu Veeteed as a reserve vessel on the route between Hiiumaa and Saaremaa.
