= MF Ottersøy III =

History
- Name: Ottersøy III (1955–67); S. U. (1967–68); Austafjord (1968 – c. 1970); Botnan (–1981)
- Owner: Helge Fjær (1955–65); Sverre Ulsund (1965–68); Namdalens Trafikkselskap (1968–70); Namsos Trafikkselskap (1970–79); Trønderdykk (1979–81)
- Operator: Helge Fjær (1955–65); Sverre Ulsund (1965–68); Namdalens Trafikkselskap (1968–70); Namsos Trafikkselskap (1970–79)
- Route: Ottersøy–Rørvik (1955–65); Kvernvik–Dalen–Austafjord (1965–72); Kjerstivika–Leirvika (1972–75); Hårnes–Kilan (1975–77); Borgan–Ramstadlandet (1977–78)
- Builder: Ramfjord Båtbyggeri
- Yard number: 165
- Completed: 1955
- Identification: Call sign: LLYZ
- Fate: Broken in 1981

General characteristics
- Type: Vehicle and passenger ferry
- Tonnage: 50 GRT, 22 NRT
- Length: 17.71 m (58 ft 1 in)
- Beam: 5.76 m (18 ft 11 in)
- Draught: 2.96 m (9 ft 9 in)
- Propulsion: Brunvoll diesel engine
- Capacity: 2 passenger car units; 50 passengers

MF Ottersøy III was a Norwegian roll-on/roll-off passenger and road vehicle ferry. Built in 1955, she had a capacity for 50 passengers, one bus and two cars.

Originally named MF Ottersøy III, she was ordered by Helge Fjær for the Ottersøy–Rørvik. She was sold to Sverre Ulsund, who named her MF S. U. and used her on the Kvernvik–Dalen–Austafjord service. The service and ship was sold to Namdalens Trafikkselskap in 1968, which again merged two years later to form Namsos Trafikkselskap. There she was first renamed MF Austafjord and then MF Botnan. She was used in various smaller ferry routes until 1978. She saw a short spell as a diving ship until being broken in 1981.

== Specifications ==
The ship was a wooden roll-on/roll-off ferry. She had a tonnage of 50 gross register and 22 net register. She was 17.71 meters (58 ft 1 in) long, with a beam of 5.76 meters (18 ft 11 in) and a draught of 2.96 meters (9 ft 9 in). She was powered by a Brunvoll diesel engine with a power output of 64 kW (84 hp). She had a capacity for 50 passengers, one bus and two cars.

== History ==
The vessel was ordered by Helge Fjær, the proprietor of the Ottersøy–Rørvik Ferry. The ferry service had been operating with Ottersøy II since 1935. It had only place for a single vehicle and had become obsolete by the 1950s. By the mid-50s, the road authorities were finally willing to build proper road vehicle loading ramps at both Ottersøya and Rørvik, which allowed Fjær to procure a ro-ro ferry for the Nærøysundet crossing. Ottersøy was delivered in 1955.

Ottersøy III was built by Ramfjord Båtbyggeri in Kolvereid. It remained in service on the Ottersøy–Rørvik service for ten years. By then she was too small, and Fjær procured the larger MF Ottersøy IV, delivered in 1964.

Ownership of Ottersøy III passed to Sverre Ulsund in December 1965. He operated the Kvernvik–Dalen–Austafjord service in Vikna, which connected Mellom-Vikna and Ytter-Vikna. He changed the name of the ferry to S. U. on 16 October 1967. Operations of the ferry were sold to Namdalens Trafikkselskap in May 1968, along with ownership of the ferry. She was initially named Austafjord, later changed to Botnan. Through a corporate merger, ownership and operation of the ship passed to Namsos Trafikkselskap in 1970.

The opening of Langsundet Bridge on 14 April 1972 made the ferry service redundant. The freed up ferry allowed the Kjerstivika–Seiersted–Salsnes service to be split, and Botnan take over Kjerstivika–Leirvika. She went aground at Kvernmoen on 19 February 1973.

Namsos Trafikkselskap established a new ferry route, Hårnes–Kilan, in 1975, and Botnan was moved to this route. The main engine received a full overhaul in January 1976. She was yet again moved to a newly established ferry route, Borgan–Ramstadlandet, from 1977. She only served a year on that route, before being retired and put up for sale.

Trønderdykk of Namsos bought her for ten thousand Norwegian kroner on 30 August 1979, and used her as a diving vessel. They sold the ship in September 1981 to Halvor Hågensen of Namsos for breaking.
