= Ottersøy–Rørvik Ferry =

Ferry service in Norway

Ottersøy–Rørvik
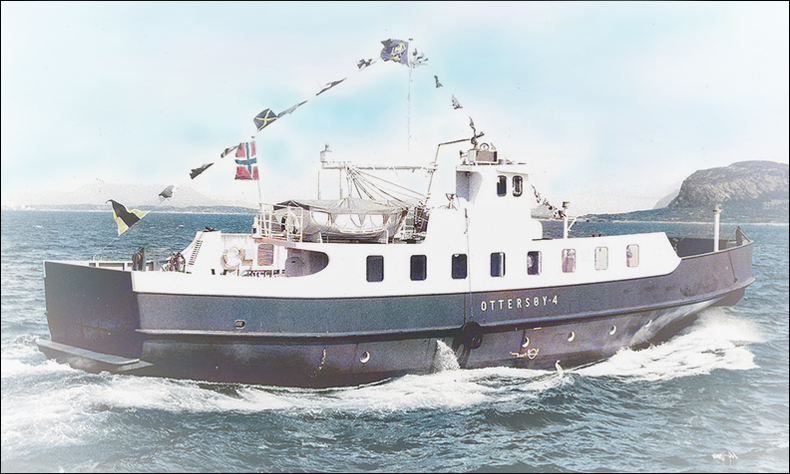
- Locale: Nærøysund Municipality, Norway
- Waterway: Nærøysundet
- Transit type: Passenger and road vehicle ferry
- Carries: National Road 770
- Operator: Fjær family
- Began operation: 1929
- Ended operation: 6 November 1981
- Successor: Nærøysund Bridge and Marøysund Bridge
- System length: 2.3 km (1.4 mi)
- Yearly ridership: 247.490 (1980)
- Yearly vehicles: 74.613 (1980)

The Ottersøy–Rørvik Ferry (Norwegian: Ferjesambandet Ottersøy–Rørvik) was a passenger and road vehicle ferry which crossed Nærøysundet in Nærøysund Municipality, Norway, connecting Rørvik to Ottersøya. It carried National Road 770 across the sound, providing a link for Vikna Municipality to the wider world.

The service was started by Harald Fjær in 1929 with the passenger ferry Ottersøy. A new ship, Ottersøy II was delivered in 1935. Ownership passed to his son Helge Fjær in the late 1940. A proper car ferry, MF Ottersøy III, was introduced in 1955, along with a proper slip in Rørvik. The final vessel on the route, MF Ottersøy IV, was built in 1965. The service had its last run on 6 November 1981, when the opening of the Nærøysund Bridge made the ferry redundant.

== History ==
Harald Fjær began rowing and sailing across the sound to sell milk from his farm at Ottersøy to people in Rørvik. People would often ask if they could catch a lift, and this gradually became an important side income for him. Eventually he would start boating across on request. In particular, many people from the Nærøy side wanted to get over the sound to catch Hurtigruten, the main coastal express service.

Ottersøy was connected to the mainland by bridge in the late 1920s, and this suddenly made Ottersøy a much more important destiantion than before. Eying a profitable venture, Fjær bought his first motorship in 1929, MS Ottersøy. He put it into a scheduled passenger service, as it lacked space for a car.

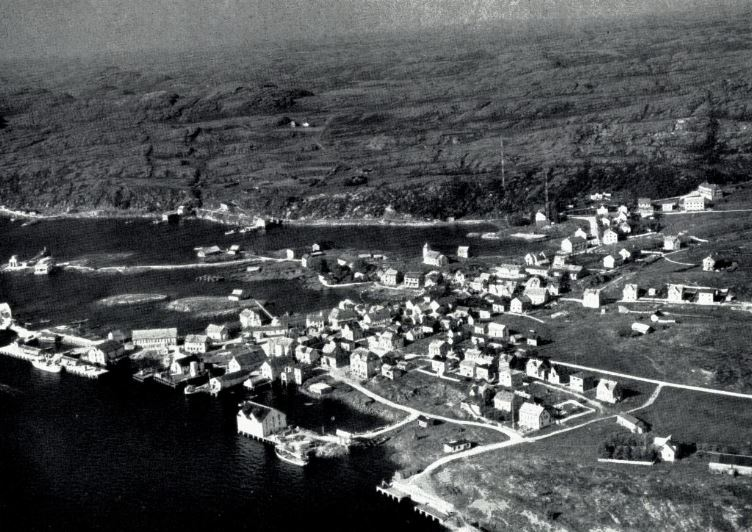
Rørvik in the 1950s, before the construction of a proper vehicle ferry dock

The ferry quickly became too small, so Fjær determined to buy a larger ferry, which he named Ottersøy II. It had space for a single car. At Ottersøy Fjær built a slip to easilly load and unload a vehicle, but no such facility was available at Rørvik. Instead, a make-shift gang-planck was installed. Whether or not this could be doen was determined by the tides.

Harald Fjær died in the late 1940s, only 50 years old, and the operations passed to his sons, with Helge Fjær (aged 23) taking over as owner. Increasing traffic, and especially a demand for vehicle transport, resaulted in the delivery of Ottersøy III in 1955. This was made possible by the construction of a proper ferry quay in Rørvik. Ottersøy III had a capacity for six cars.

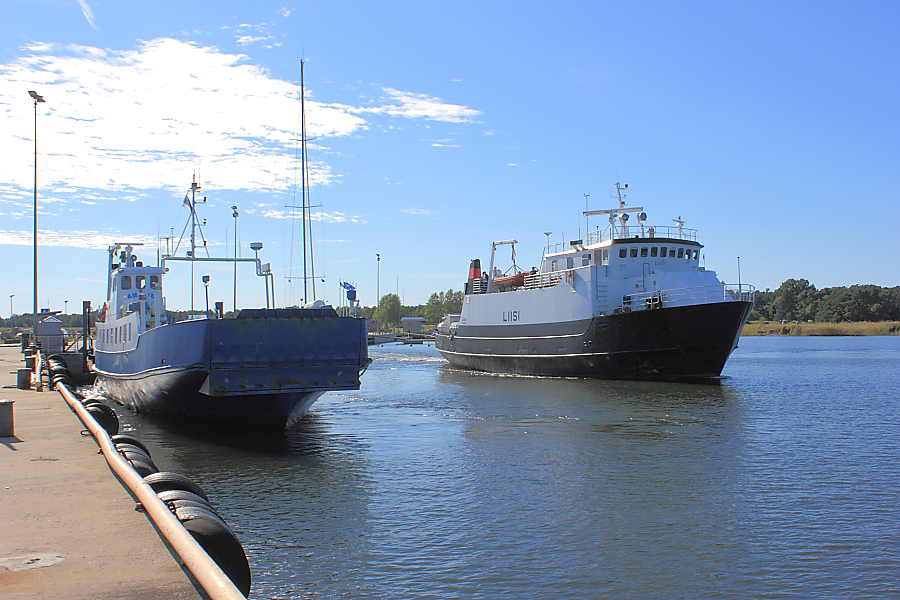
Ottersøy IV was sold in 1981 and eventually ended up in Kihnu, Estonia, as Amalie (left).

The fourth and final ferry, Ottersøy IV, was delivered in 1964, with a capacity for twelve cars. This was also the only year with profitable operations, otherwise the ferry service received subsidies to be able to retain operations. The operations were maintained with three shift each with three crew members. Towards the end the ferry was designed to be in constant readiness, so the crew would sleep on board in case emergency vehicles needed to cross the sound at night.

Traffic rose by about ten percent per year during the 1970s. The ferry had 34,952 vehicles and 141,000 passengers in 1972. This had increased to 74,613 vehicles and 247,490 passengers in its final full operating year, 1980. It was evident that the ferry was too small, but by then it had become clear that Vikna would be connected by fixed link to Nærøy. Instead, the frequency was increased, and in the summer months a second ferry was leased to add capacity. At the end they were making 74 trips combined across the sound each day.

During the 1970s, a major investment was initiated to make National Road 770 a fixed link for Nærøy and Vikna. The Folda Bridge opened in 1969, followed by bridges connecting the main islands in Vikna. The Marøysund Bridge opened in 1978, which connected Marøya to the mainland. Finally on 6 November 1981 the Nærøysund Bridge opened, creating a fixed link for Rørvik and Vikna via Marøy. With the ferry became redundant, and ran for the last time the same day.
