= Nærøysund Lighthouse =

Coastal lighthouse in Norway

Nærøysund Lighthouse Nærøysund fyrstasjon
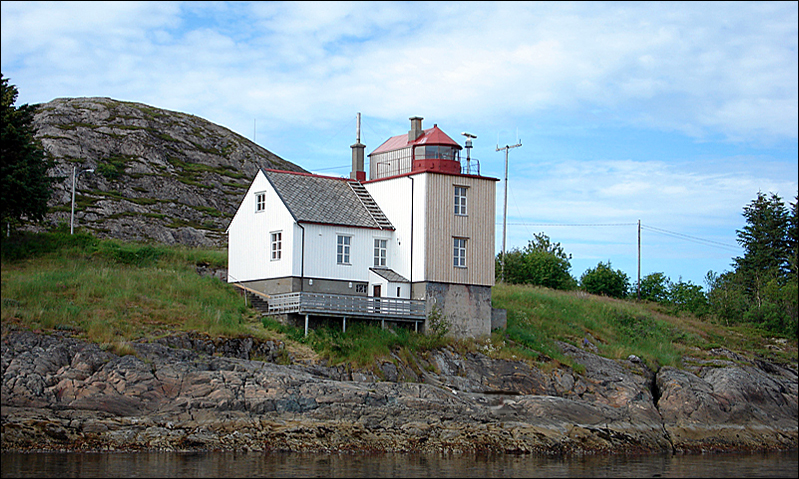
- View of the lighthouse
- Location: Trøndelag, Norway
- Coordinates: 64°50′34.2″N 11°11′41.2″E

Tower
- Constructed: 1904 (first)
- Construction: Wood
- Automated: 1984
- Height: 13.9 metres (46 ft)
- Shape: Cylindrical tower
- Markings: White with red top

Light
- First lit: 1984 (current)
- Deactivated: 1984 (first)
- Focal height: 12.9 metres (42 ft)
- Intensity: 26,100 candela
- Range: 12.7 nmi (23.5 km; 14.6 mi)
- Characteristic: Oc WRG 6S
- Norway no.: 551500

Nærøysund Lighthouse (Norwegian: Nærøysund fyr) is a coastal lighthouse in Nærøysund Municipality in Trøndelag, Norway. This lighthouse replaced the Prestøy Lighthouse south of the island of Nærøya (across the Nærøysundet strait from this lighthouse) that was in operation from 1841 until 1904. This lighthouse was operational from 1904 until 1984, when the old lighthouse was decommissioned and a new automated light tower was built adjacent to the building.

Nærøysund lighthouse stands on the eastern shore of the island of Inner-Vikna, just south of Rørvik, along the Nærøysundet strait. The light tower is 13.9 metres (46 ft) tall. The occulting light has a 6-second cycle, emitting a 26,100-candela light. The light can be seen for about 12.7 nautical miles (23.5 km; 14.6 mi).

== See also ==
- Lighthouses in Norway
- List of lighthouses in Norway
