= Ottersøya =

Village in Nærøysund Municipality, Norway

- Village
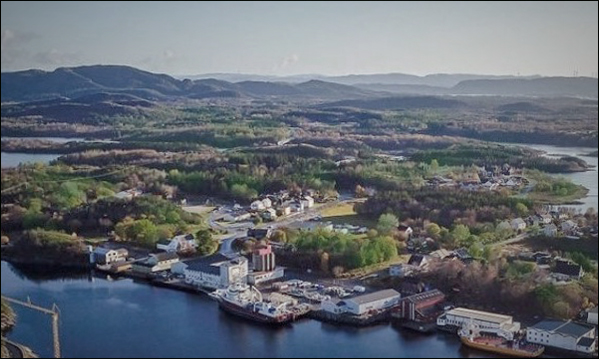
- View of the village
- Interactive map of Ottersøya
- Location within Trøndelag Location within Norway
- Coordinates: 64.8574°N 11.2881°E
- Country: Norway
- Region: Central Norway
- County: Trøndelag
- District: Namdalen
- Municipality: Nærøysund Municipality

Area
  - Total: 0.35 km^{2} (0.14 sq mi)
- Elevation: 6 m (20 ft)

Population (2024)
  - Total: 262
  - Density: 749/km^{2} (1,940/sq mi)
- Time zone: UTC+01:00 (CET)
  - Summer (DST): UTC+02:00 (CEST)
- Post Code: 7940 Ottersøy

Ottersøya is a village in Nærøysund Municipality in Trøndelag county, Norway. The village is located at the southwestern end of the Kvingra peninsula, just across the Nærøysundet from the town of Rørvik. In Ottersøya there are, among other things, grocery store, post office (Ottersøya has postcode 7940), hairdresser and petrol station. Important workplaces on Ottersøya besides trade and service are Nærøysund Kraftbetong A/S, Noprec - Containerservice Ottersøya and Mekon AS. In Ottersøya there is a large dry dock owned by Moen Slipp. Nærøysundet school, which is a fully divided primary school plus after-school, is located in Ottersøya. Ottersøy kindergarten is also located here.

The village of Torstad lies about 6 kilometres (3.7 mi) north of Ottersøya. The Marøysund Bridge and Nærøysund Bridge (which connect Inner-Vikna to the mainland) lie just south of Ottersøya. Before the mainland connection to Inner-Vikna and Rørvik was established in 1981, Ottersøya was the ferry port for Rørvik.

The 0.35-square-kilometre (86-acre) village has a population (2024) of 262 and a population density of 749 inhabitants per square kilometre (1,940/sq mi). The village and surrounding district has 359 inhabitants.
