= Gjerdinga =

Island in Trøndelag, Norway

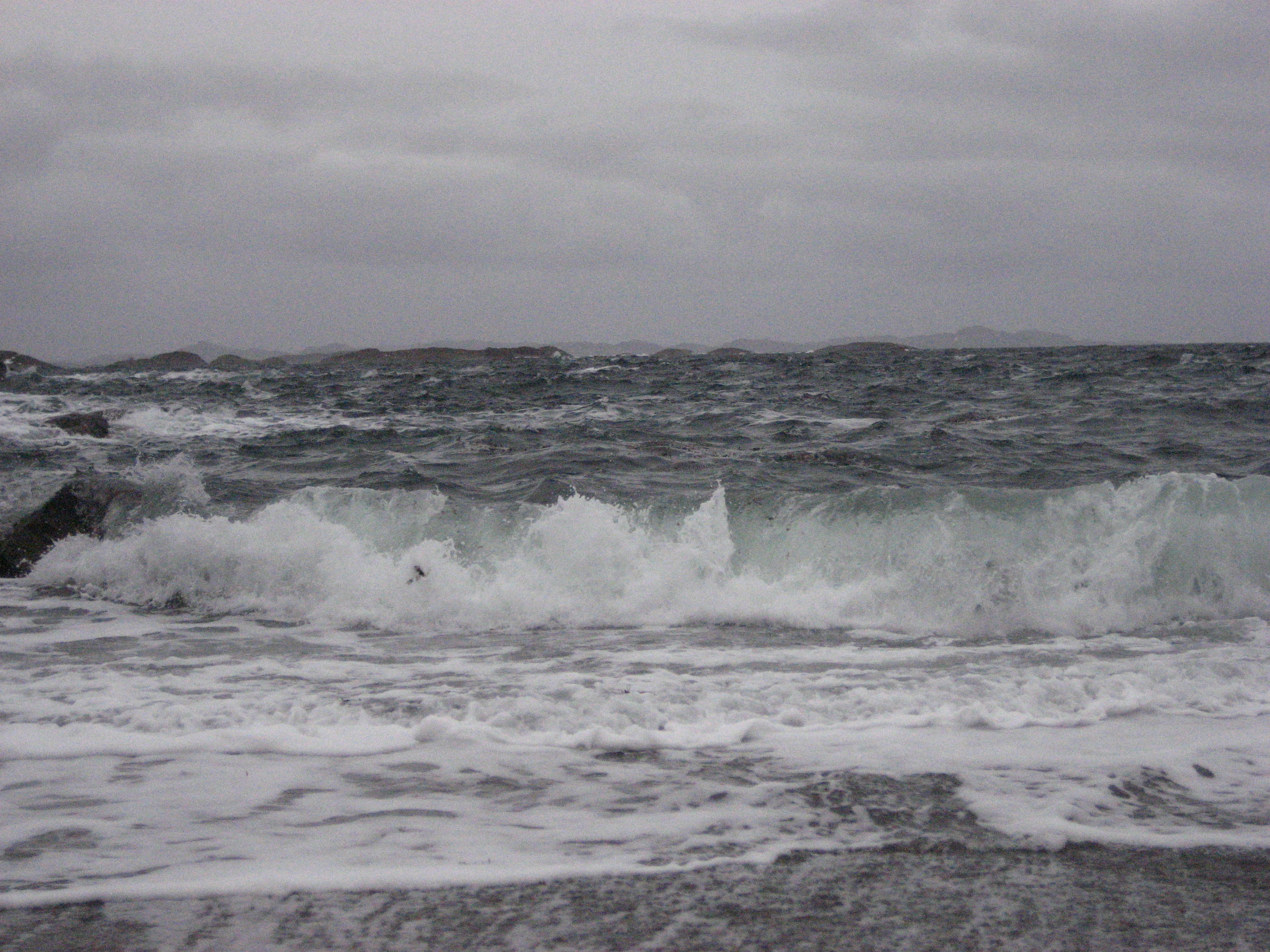
- Waves breaking on the northern shore of the island
- Interactive map of Gjerdinga

Geography
- Location: Trøndelag, Norway
- Coordinates: 64.95168°N 11.42938°E
- Area: 5.5 km^{2} (2.1 sq mi)
- Length: 3.6 km (2.24 mi)
- Width: 2.4 km (1.49 mi)
- Highest elevation: 117 m (384 ft)
- Highest point: Øyrshatten

Administration
- Norway
- County: Trøndelag
- Municipality: Nærøysund Municipality

Demographics
- Population: 20
- Pop. density: 3.6/km^{2} (9.3/sq mi)

Gjerdinga is an island in Nærøysund Municipality in Trøndelag county, Norway. The island lies at the northern end of the Nærøysundet. Most of the 20 residents of the island live in the village of Gjerdinga on the southeastern part of the island. The island is connected to the mainland by a ferry operated by Namsos Trafikkselskap. The ferry goes between Sæla (on the island) and Eidshaug (on Kvingra on the mainland) six times per day.
