= Nærøy =

Nærøy or Nærøya may refer to:

== Places ==
- Nærøya, an island in Nærøysund Municipality in Trøndelag county, Norway
- Nærøya (Nordland), an island in Øksnes Municipality in Nordland county, Norway
- Nærøy Municipality, a former municipality in Trøndelag county, Norway
- Nærøy Church, ruins of a church in Nærøysund Municipality in Trøndelag county, Norway

== Other ==
- Nærøy parish, a Church of Norway parish based at Bakka Church in Aurland Municipality in Vestland county, Norway
- Nærøy prosti, a former deanery within the Diocese of Nidaros in the Church of Norway
- Nærøy manuscript, a 1723 treatise by Johan Randulf
