= Torstad =

Village in Nærøysund Municipality, Norway

- Village
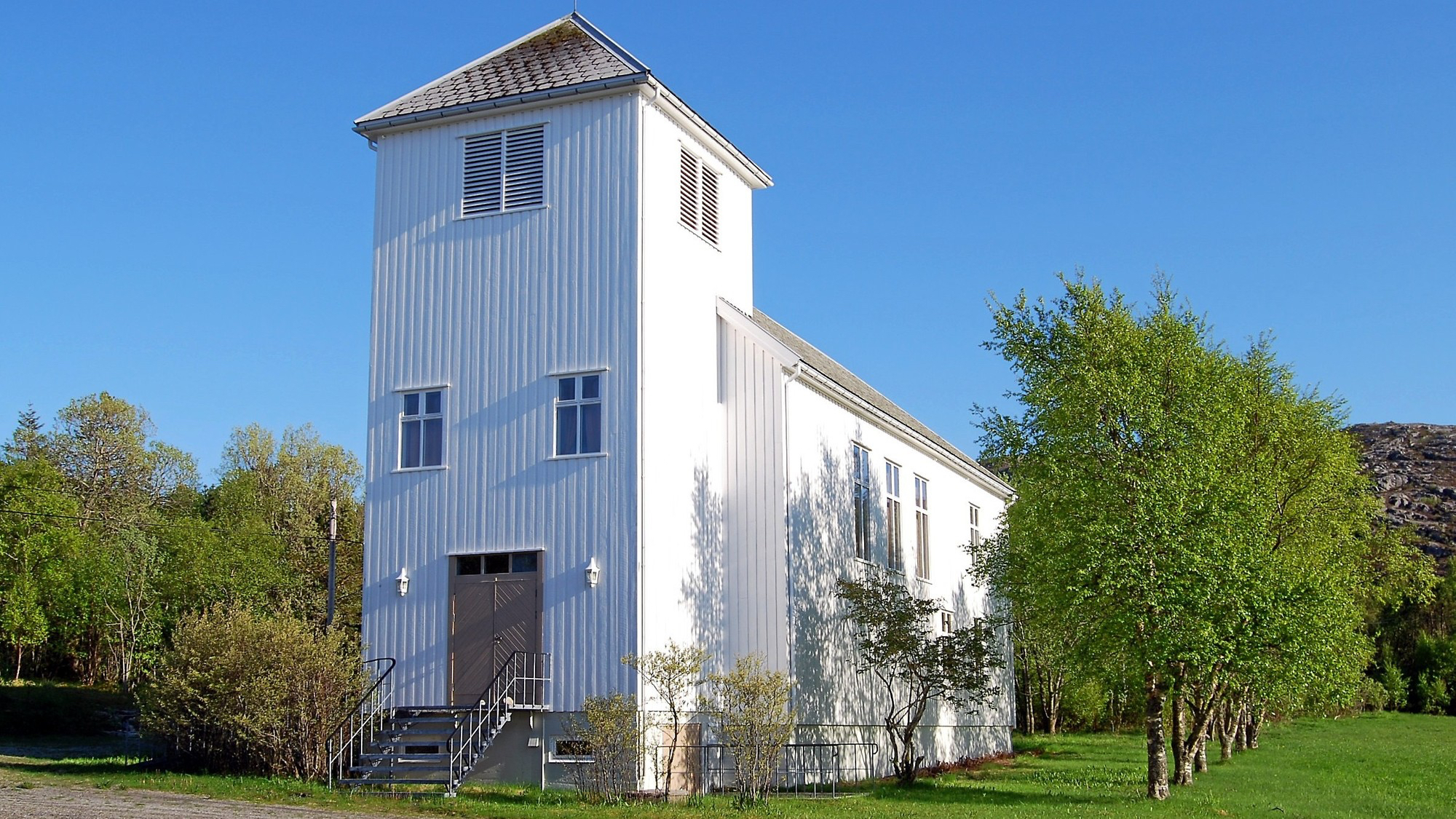
- View of the village
- Interactive map of Torstad
- Location within Trøndelag Location within Norway
- Coordinates: 64.8966°N 11.3596°E
- Country: Norway
- Region: Central Norway
- County: Trøndelag
- District: Namdalen
- Municipality: Nærøysund Municipality
- Elevation: 12 m (39 ft)
- Time zone: UTC+01:00 (CET)
  - Summer (DST): UTC+02:00 (CEST)
- Post Code: 7940 Ottersøy

Torstad is a village in Nærøysund Municipality in Trøndelag county, Norway. The village is located on the Kvingra peninsula, along the Nærøysundet strait, about 6 kilometres (3.7 mi) north of the village of Ottersøya. The Torstad Chapel is located here, which serves this area of the municipality.
