= Lundring Church =

Church in Trøndelag, Norway

- Lundring kirke
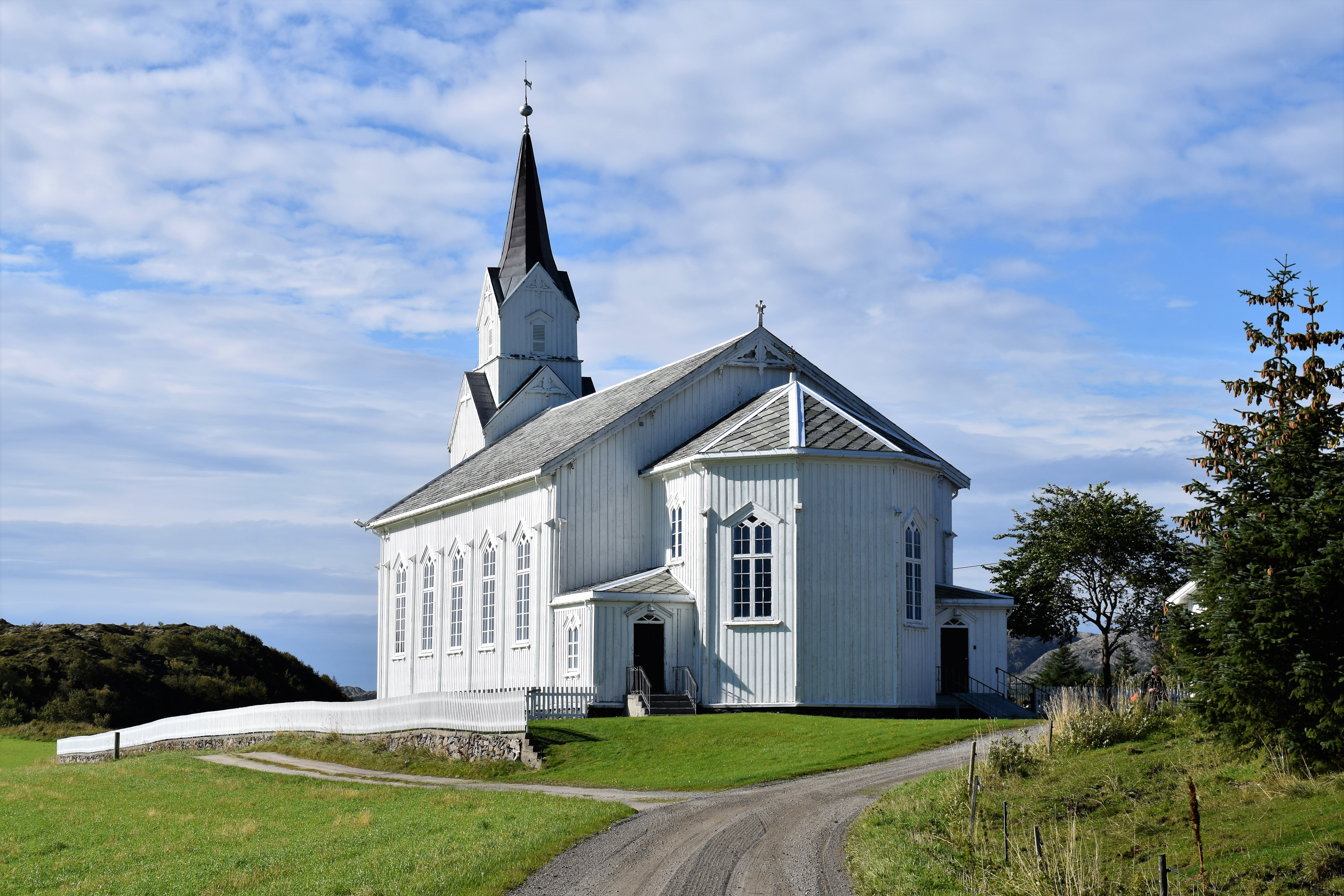
- View of the church
- Lundring Church
- 64.81667543°N 11.25692009°E
- Location: Nærøysund Municipality, Trøndelag
- Country: Norway
- Denomination: Church of Norway
- Churchmanship: Evangelical Lutheran

History
- Status: Parish church
- Founded: 1851
- Consecrated: 12 May 1885

Architecture
- Functional status: Active
- Architect: Jacob Wilhelm Nordan
- Architectural type: Long church
- Style: Neo-Gothic
- Completed: 1885 (141 years ago)

Specifications
- Capacity: 370
- Materials: Wood

Administration
- Diocese: Nidaros bispedømme
- Deanery: Namdal prosti
- Parish: Nærøy
- Norwegian Cultural Heritage Site
- Type: Church
- Status: Listed
- ID: 84341

Lundring Church (Norwegian: Lundring kirke) is a parish church of the Church of Norway in Nærøysund Municipality in Trøndelag county, Norway. It is located in the small farming village of Lundring. It is one of the churches for the Nærøy parish which is part of the Namdal prosti (deanery) in the Diocese of Nidaros. The neo-Gothic, white, wooden church was built in a long church style in 1885 using plans drawn up by the architect Jacob Wilhelm Nordan. The church seats about 600 people.

== History ==
In 1847, the Old Nærøy Church burned down on the nearby island of Nærøya. It was decided to build its replacement on the mainland in the nearby village of Lundring. The first church at Lundring was built by G. Sverdrup and Consul Hoe who owned the land and became the owners of the new church. They based the design off of one of the drawings of Hans Linstow. It was a wooden long church that was consecrated on 23 May 1851. In 1873, a choir and sacristy were added. The church had around 300 seats. The surrounding cemetery was taken into use at the same time as the church. The church was sold in 1882 and the people of the parish purchased it. The following year in 1883 permission was granted to demolish it and build a new church. This new building was designed by Jacob Wilhelm Nordan. The old church was demolished in 1884, and the new one was completed on the same site in the spring of 1885. It was consecrated on 12 May 1885. The new church was almost twice as large as the previous building, originally seating about 600 (although now due to current fire restrictions, it is estimated to comfortably seat about 370 people).

== See also ==
- List of churches in Nidaros
