= Kihnu Veeteed =

Estonian ferry company

AS Kihnu Veeteed
- Industry: Maritime transportation
- Founded: 2002
- Headquarters: Sääre, Pärnu County, Estonia
- Key people: Jaak Kaabel (CEO)
- Website: veeteed.com

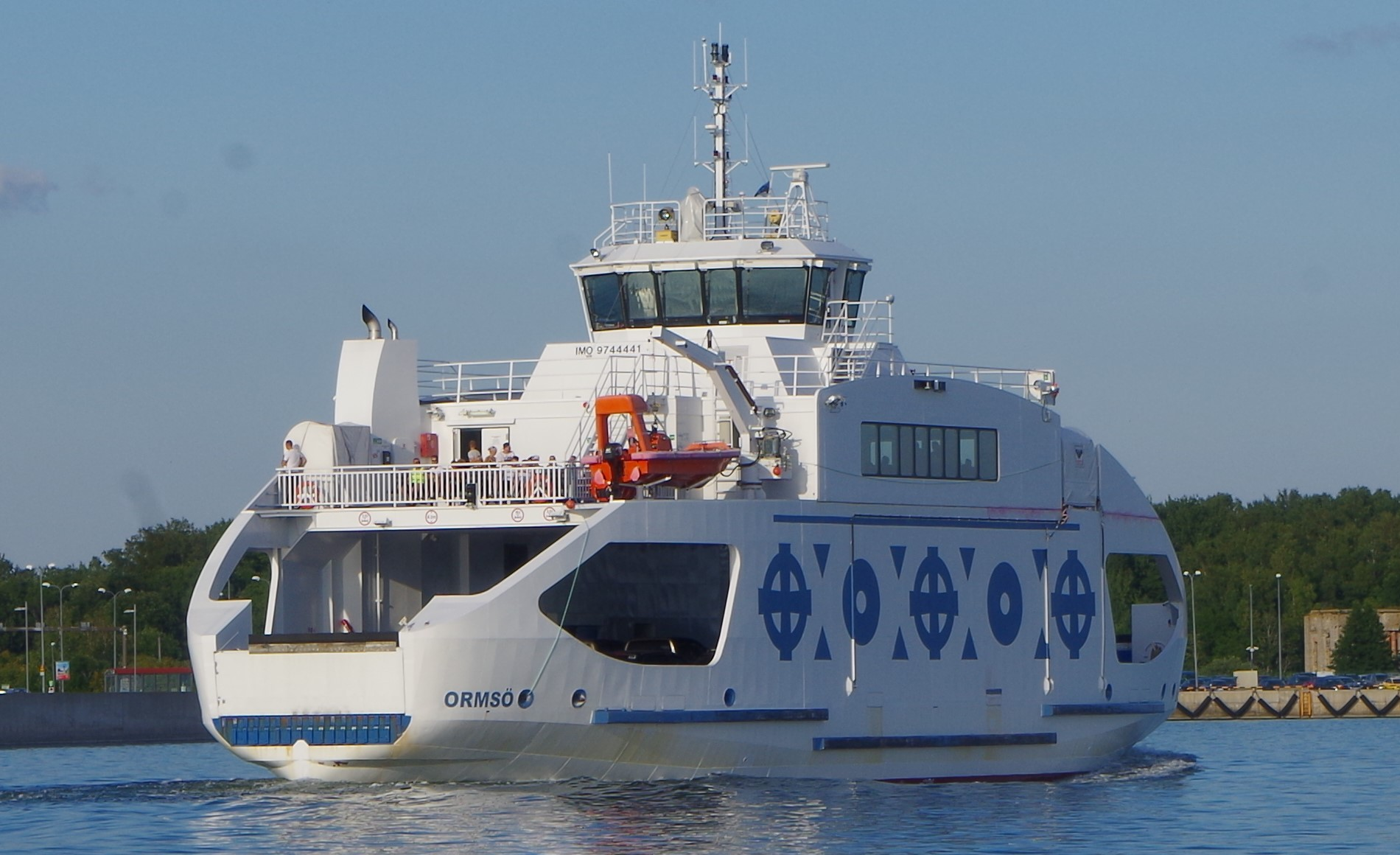
The Vormsi ferry "Ormsö" in Rohuküla

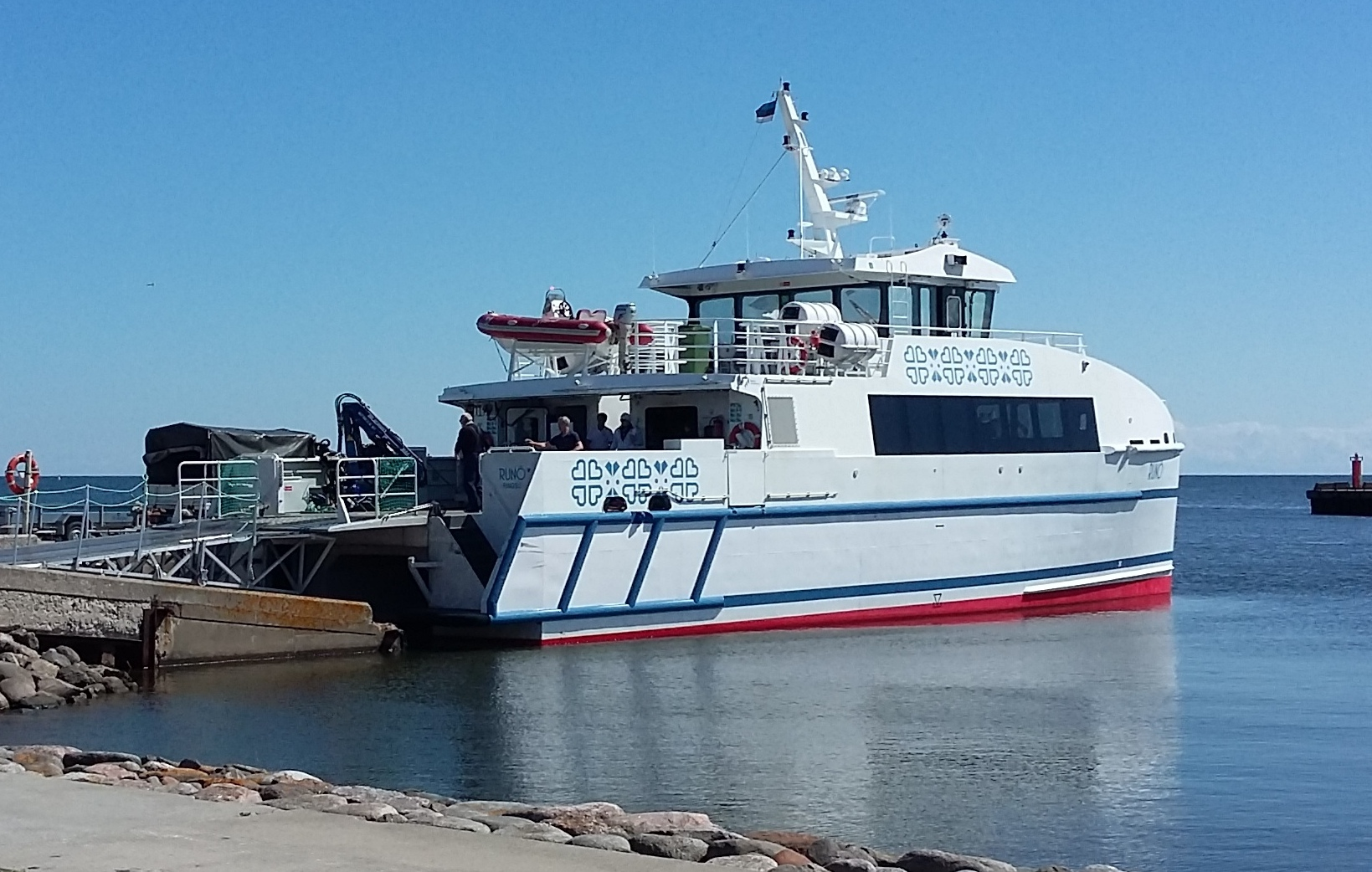
"Runö" was operated by Kihnu Veeteed on routes to Ruhnu from 2012 to 2022

Kihnu Veeteed ("Kihnu Waterways") is a ferry company which operates six scheduled routes in Estonia. It is registered on the island of Kihnu in the Gulf of Riga, and runs a fleet of seven passenger ferries.

The company's ferries provide connections between the mainland and the small islands of Kihnu, Manilaid, Vormsi, and Piirissaar. There is also a connection between the country's two largest islands, Saaremaa and Hiiumaa. As of 2024, the Vormsi service had the most departures with 2,744 trips annually. Kihnu had the most passengers, with a figure of 85,000 annually.

In August 2026 the Ministry of Regional Affairs and Agriculture announced that a new operator, Tuule Liinid, will be taking over most of the small island routes in autumn 2027.

== Operations ==
The ferry lines are operated on the basis of public procurement contracts, and most of the company's vessels are owned by the Estonian state, and specially built for these routes. The three sister ships Soela, Ormsö and Kihnu Virve entered service between 2015 and 2017. They were built by Baltic Workboats in Nasva, Estonia and each has a capacity of 200 passengers and 32 cars. In addition, the Kihnu Maritime Fleet also owns two passenger ferries, Amalie and Reet, both of which are over fifty years old, and are used as back-up vessels.

When ice conditions are too difficult for the usual vessels to reach Kihnu and Piirissaar, hovercraft are able to operate on these routes. Some of Kihnu Veeteed's routes are supplemented by ice roads in cold winters.

In 2022 Kihnu Veeteed was replaced by Tuule Liinid as the operator of catamaran services to Ruhnu from Saaremaa and the mainland.

In 2025 Kihnu Veeteed commissioned a study into shortening the ferry route to Kihnu, potentially by 20–25 percent. An alternative route through the Kakra Channel was considered, which would save fuel and make the trip to Kihnu less susceptible to difficult weather conditions.

== "Amalie" rescue operation ==
A large scale rescue operation took place in the Gulf of Riga in the early morning of 10 November 2023 when Kihnu Veeteed's ferry MVAmalie developed a 10–15 degree list caused by cargo shifting in bad weather. Most of the passengers were evacuated by helicopter and rescue boats. Amalie's crew had attempted to reach Ruhnu harbour before diverting towards Mērsrags in Latvia.

Kihnu Veeteed board member Jaak Kaabel said Amalie's passengers, the vehicles on the car deck, and the ferry itself were unharmed in the incident. Regional minister Madis Kallas said a modern ferry would be procured to provide back-up on services to Ruhnu and the other smaller island routes. Amalie was built in Norway in 1965 and entered service with Kihnu Veeteed in 2004.

== See also ==
- TS Laevad – operator of ferries to Estonia's larger islands
