= Kvingra =

Island in Trøndelag, Norway

- Peninsula / Island
- Interactive map of the peninsula
- Coordinates: 64.8856°N 11.4159°E
- Location: Trøndelag, Norway
- Offshore water bodies: Nærøysundet

Area
  - Total: 54 km^{2} (21 sq mi)

Kvingra is an island (and former peninsula) in Nærøysund Municipality in Trøndelag county, Norway. Kvingra is surrounded by the Sørsalten fjord to the south, the Nærøysundet strait in the northwest, and the Nordsalten fjord in the northeast. The island was originally connected to the mainland on a tiny isthmus of land in the southeast, but there is a man-made canal through it, so the peninsula now is technically an island. The 54-square-kilometre (21 sq mi) island has a population of about 400 (as of 2001). The largest population center on the island is the village of Ottersøya on the southwestern tip of the peninsula.
