= Bergen Nordhordland Rutelag =

Norwegian transport company

Bergen Nordhordland Rutelag AS
- Founded: 1974
- Defunct: 30 April 2003
- Headquarters: Osterøy, Norway
- Website: www.bnr.no

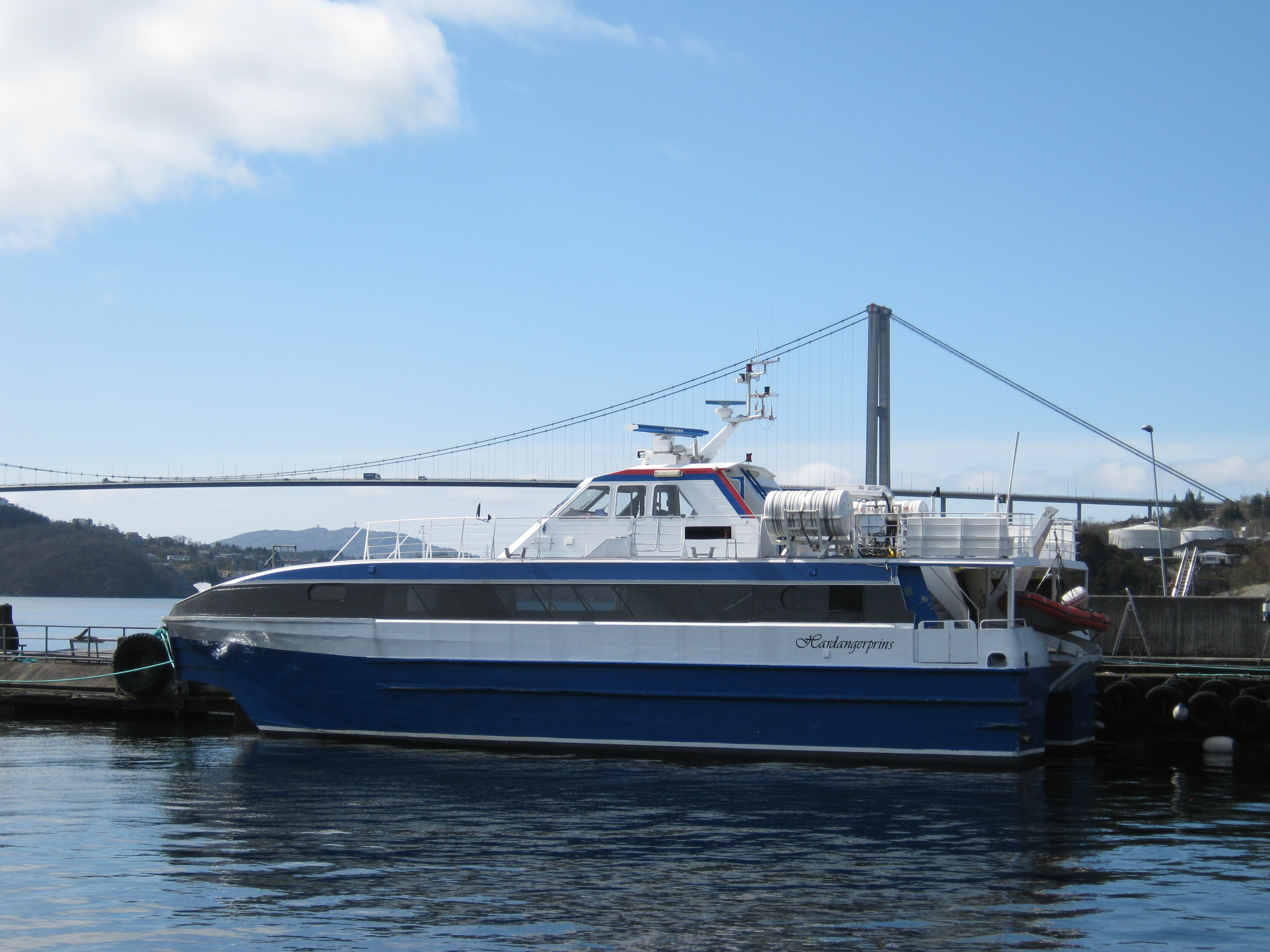
Hardangerprins in Kleppestø

Bergen Nordhordland Rutelag is a Norwegian company based in Vestland county. The company operates a small fleet of ferries.

== History ==
BNR It has roots back to 1880 when Lindaas-Masfjorden Dampskibsselskap was created. The company was founded in 1974 when Bergen-Nordhordland Trafikklag, Indre Nordhordland Dampbåtlag and Arna-Osterøy Billag merged. The company had permission to operate bus transport in the municipalities of Meland, Lindås, Radøy, Austrheim, Fedje, Masfjorden, and Osterøy. The company also operated car ferries and owned the ferry company Fjord Line. The company was bought by Hardanger Sunnhordlandske Dampskipsselskap as of January 2002 while Fjord Line still is independent. In 2006 HSD merged with Gaia Trafikk forming the new company Tide.

In 2004, BNR were established again as a fast ferry company, and are operating 6 fast ferries in the Bergen region and in Sogn og Fjordane (Flåm - Gudvangen and Flåm - Sogndal).

== Fleet ==
The new BNR fleet consists of 6 express boats and 2 car ferries.

- MS "Fjord Express", Monohull express boat
- MS "Hardangerprins", Catamaran
- MS "Sogneprins", Catamaran
- MS "Snarveien", Catamaran
- MS "Sea Express", Monohull express boat
- MS "Prinsessen", Catamaran
- MF "Sundferja", Car ferry
- MF "Fjordbas", Car ferry
