= Rørvik Airport =

Airport in Ryumsjøen, Norway

Rørvik Airport Rørvik lufthavn

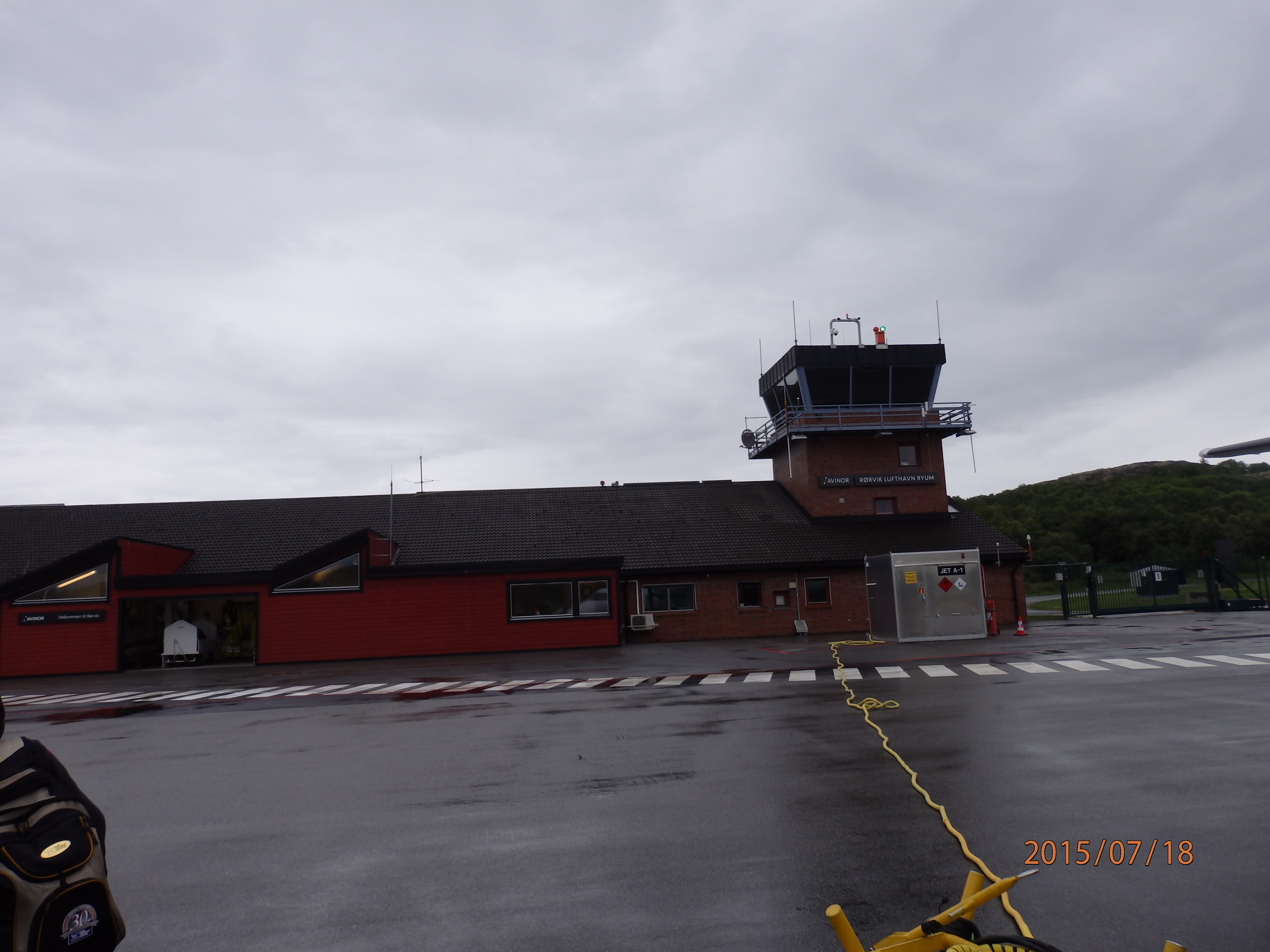
- IATA: RVK; ICAO: ENRM

Summary
- Airport type: Public
- Owner/Operator: Avinor
- Serves: Rørvik, Norway
- Location: Ryumsjøen, Nærøysund Municipality, Trøndelag
- Elevation AMSL: 45 m / 15 ft
- Coordinates: 64°50′18″N 011°08′46″E
- Website: avinor.no

Map

Runways
Direction	Length		Surface
Direction	m	ft	Surface
04/22	830	2,723	Asphalt

Statistics (2015)
- Passengers: 34,168
- Aircraft movements: 3,213

Rørvik Airport (Norwegian: Rørvik lufthavn; IATA: RVK, ICAO: ENRM) is a regional airport located at Ryumsjøen, about 6 kilometers (4 mi) south of the town Rørvik in Nærøysund Municipality in Trøndelag County, Norway. The airport is owned and operated by the state-owned Avinor and serves Nærøysund Municipality and its surroundings. The airport has a 950-meter (3,117 ft) asphalt runway numbered 04–22. Widerøe flies to the airport with its Bombardier Dash 8 aircraft on contract with the Ministry of Transport and Communications. The airport opened in 1986 as a municipal airport. It was first served by Norving, but Widerøe took over the flights in 1988. The airport was nationalized in 1996.

== History ==
Plans for an airport with short take-off and landing flights was launched by the government in December 1983. The airport was proposed along with five other regionals airport: Fagernes Airport, Leirin; Førde Airport, Bringeland; Mosjøen Airport, Kjærstad; Røst Airport and Værøy Airport. The plans were passed by Parliament on 10 April 1984. Grants for starting construction were issued on the 1985 state budget and operating permission was issued by the government on 6 September 1985. The financing was split between the state (60 percent), Vikna Municipality (30 percent) and Nord-Trøndelag County Municipality (10 percent). The municipal funding was financed through a loan in Kommunalbanken. Most of the state funding was granted on the 1986 state budget, along with three other airports. The original target was for 12,000 passengers per year.

The airport was estimated to cost 15 to 16 million kr, but the lowest tender was between 10 and 11 million kr. The airport ended having severe cost overruns—NOK 12 million combined with Førde Airport. Ryum was scheduled to be opened on 1 October 1986, but there was too bad weather that day that the ceremonies could take place, as aircraft could not land. Rørvik was initially served by Norving, which flew two services with the Dornier 228: Bodø–Rørvik–Namsos–Trondheim and Rørvik–Brønnøysund Monday through Friday. During the first winter several shortcomings were found in the terminal building and temperatures down to −6 °C (21 °F) were measured indoors.

Norving announced on 10 December 1987 that they would terminate all operations outside Finnmark. This took effect on 8 January 1988, leaving Rørvik without a scheduled services. Manning of the airport was reduced from eight to six, but the airport remained open from 08 to 23. From the summer schedules of 1988, Rørvik was included in Widerøe's services along the Helgeland coast. The airport had 7,244 passengers in 1988, and the combined subsidies per passengers was 511 kr. This included 1.3 million kr in state operating subsidies to the airport, in addition to an operating deficit of 1 million kr covered by the municipality.

From 1996, Ryum and 25 other regional airports were taken over by the state and the Civil Aviation Administration (later renamed Avinor). The airport had 17,000 passengers in 1999. Four years after the nationalization, the CAA proposed that Ryum and certain other regional airport be closed in an effort to reduce costs, but this was disapproved by the government. The airport received a renewed certification by the Civil Aviation Authority in 2001, which in addition to new runway lighting required the airport to have a rescue boat. The ministry started a process in 2001 to consider using smaller aircraft than the 37-seat Dash 8 aircraft. The reason was that there were on average only 17 passengers per flight from Rørvik and Namsos Airport, Høknesøra combined. Airport security was introduced on 1 January 2005. Since 2010, Nord-Trøndelag County Municipality has been pressing for an extension of the runway to 1,199 meters (3,934 ft) and construction of a larger hangar.

== Facilities ==
The airport is located at Ryumsjøen in Nærøysund Municipality, 6 kilometers (3.7 mi) south of Rørvik. Paid parking, taxis and car rental are available, but there is no bus service available to the airport. Ryum's catchment area includes Nærøysund Municipalitfy.

The airfield's elevation is 4.5 meters (15 ft) above mean sea level and it has a 830-by-30-meter (2,723 by 98 ft) runway aligned 04–22 (roughly northeast–southwest). An extension of the runway and the runway end safety areas (RESA) was completed in November 2012. The runway's previous length was 800 meters (2,625 ft). The western end of the runway is located on artificial land surrounded by sea. Precision approach runway (SCAT-I) with non-precision approaches RNAV and VOR/DME, but lacks instrument landing system.

== Airlines and destinations ==
Ryum Airport is served by Widerøe with Dash 8-100/200 aircraft. The services are subsidized through public service obligations with the Ministry of Transport and Communications, except Rørvik-Oslo service.

Airlines	Destinations
Widerøe	Namsos, Trondheim

== Statistics ==
Ryum served 33,532 passengers in 2014.

Annual passenger traffic
Year	Passengers	% Change
2025	43,626	▼ -1.8%
2024	44,436	▲9.8%
2023	40,478	▼ -15.7%
2022	48,039	▲42.3%
2021	33,770	▲15.5%
2020	29,248	▼ -31.3%
2019	42,553	▲4.7%
2018	40,660	▼ -4.4%
2017	42,510	▼ -15.4%
2016	50,260	▲0.8%
2015	49,840	

== Accidents and incidents ==
On 2 September 2003, a Cessna aircraft overshot the runway and landed in the sea after an emergency landing caused by loss of power immediately after take-off. Two of the people on board were uninjured and the third injured only slightly.
