= Nærøya =

Island in Trøndelag, Norway

- Interactive map of Nærøya

Geography
- Location: Trøndelag, Norway
- Coordinates: 64.82111°N 11.18528°E
- Area: 4.6 km^{2} (1.8 sq mi)
- Length: 5 km (3.1 mi)
- Width: 1.5 km (0.93 mi)

Administration
- Norway
- County: Trøndelag
- Municipality: Nærøysund Municipality

Nærøya is an island in Nærøysund Municipality in Trøndelag county, Norway. The island lies along the southern entrance to the Nærøysundet strait, about 3 kilometres (1.9 mi) south of the town of Rørvik. The Old Nærøy Church is located on the island, which historically was the namesake of the old Nærøy Municipality. Today, the island is owned by one family who farms part of the island.

== See also ==
- List of islands of Norway
