= Old Nærøy Church =

Church ruins in Trøndelag, Norway

- Nærøy gamle kirke
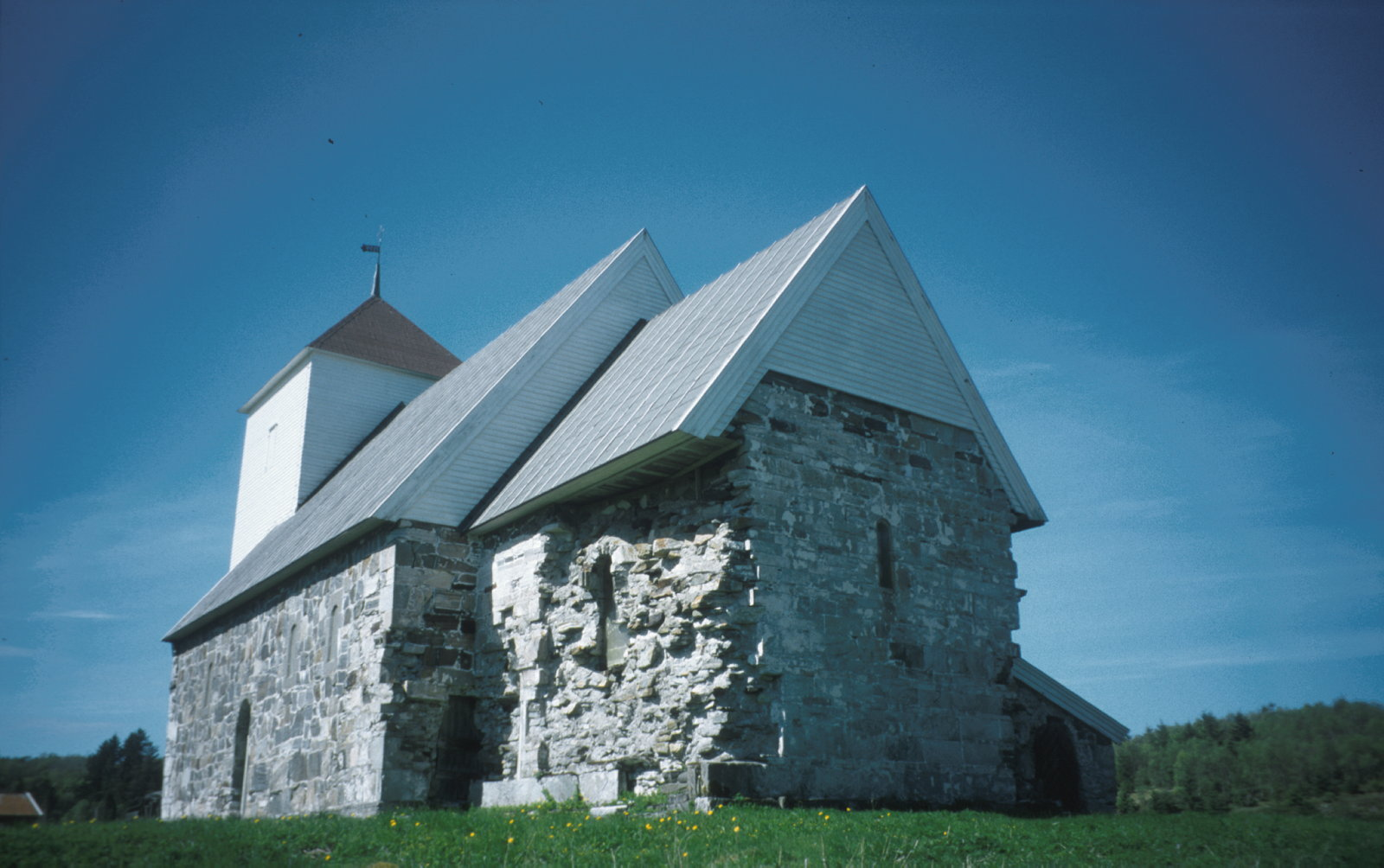
- View of the church
- Old Nærøy Church
- 64.82971530°N 11.22139826°E
- Location: Nærøysund Municipality, Trøndelag
- Country: Norway
- Denomination: Church of Norway
- Churchmanship: Evangelical Lutheran

History
- Status: Parish church
- Founded: c. 1180
- Consecrated: c. 1180

Architecture
- Functional status: Church ruins / museum
- Architectural type: Long church
- Style: Romanesque
- Completed: c. 1180 (846 years ago)
- Closed: 1847 (179 years ago)

Specifications
- Materials: Stone

Administration
- Diocese: Nidaros bispedømme
- Deanery: Namdal prosti
- Parish: Nærøy
- Norwegian Cultural Heritage Site
- Type: Church
- Status: Automatically protected
- ID: 85192

Old Nærøy Church (Norwegian: Nærøy gamle kirke or Nærøykirka) is a former parish church of the Church of Norway in Nærøysund Municipality in Trøndelag county, Norway. It is located on the small island of Nærøya. It was once the main church for the Nærøy parish which is part of the Namdal prosti (deanery) in the Diocese of Nidaros. The stone church was originally built in a long church design during the 12th century.

== History ==
The earliest existing historical records of the church date back to the year 1293, but it was likely completed around the year 1180. The centuries-old church has a rectangular nave with a narrower, rectangular chancel, and a tall tower to the west. The church was an important church for the Namdalen area. In 1597, the church was described as one of the nicest churches north of Nidaros Cathedral, with the one exception of Trondenes Church. The church survived fires in 1750 and again in 1770.

In 1814, this church served as an election church (Norwegian: valgkirke). Together with more than 300 other parish churches across Norway, it was a polling station for elections to the 1814 Norwegian Constituent Assembly which wrote the Constitution of Norway. This was Norway's first national elections. Each church parish was a constituency that elected people called "electors" who later met together in each county to elect the representatives for the assembly that was to meet at Eidsvoll Manor later that year.

In 1847, the church was struck by lightning and it burned down, leaving only the exterior stone walls remaining. The parish decided to move the church site after this last fire and in 1851, a new Lundring Church was opened on the mainland to replace this old church. After the new church opened, the old stone church fell into disrepair and it stood as ruins for over 100 years. The ruins were surveyed and examined by the architect Nils Ryjord in 1912. Later, the architect John Tverdahl led the work of restoration and reconstruction of the ruins from 1948-1961. The walls were rebuilt first and then around 1960, the roof and tower were rebuilt. After this work was completed, little was done to continue the restoration for several decades. In the late 1990s, a local organization was founded to continue the upkeep and improvements in the church. At that time the church received new floors, doors, benches, and windows. In 2004, the roof was replaced with a new slate roof. In 2016, part of the west wall of the tower collapsed. Some restoration work was begun after that to enclose the church while a plan for a more proper restoration could begin.

== Media gallery ==
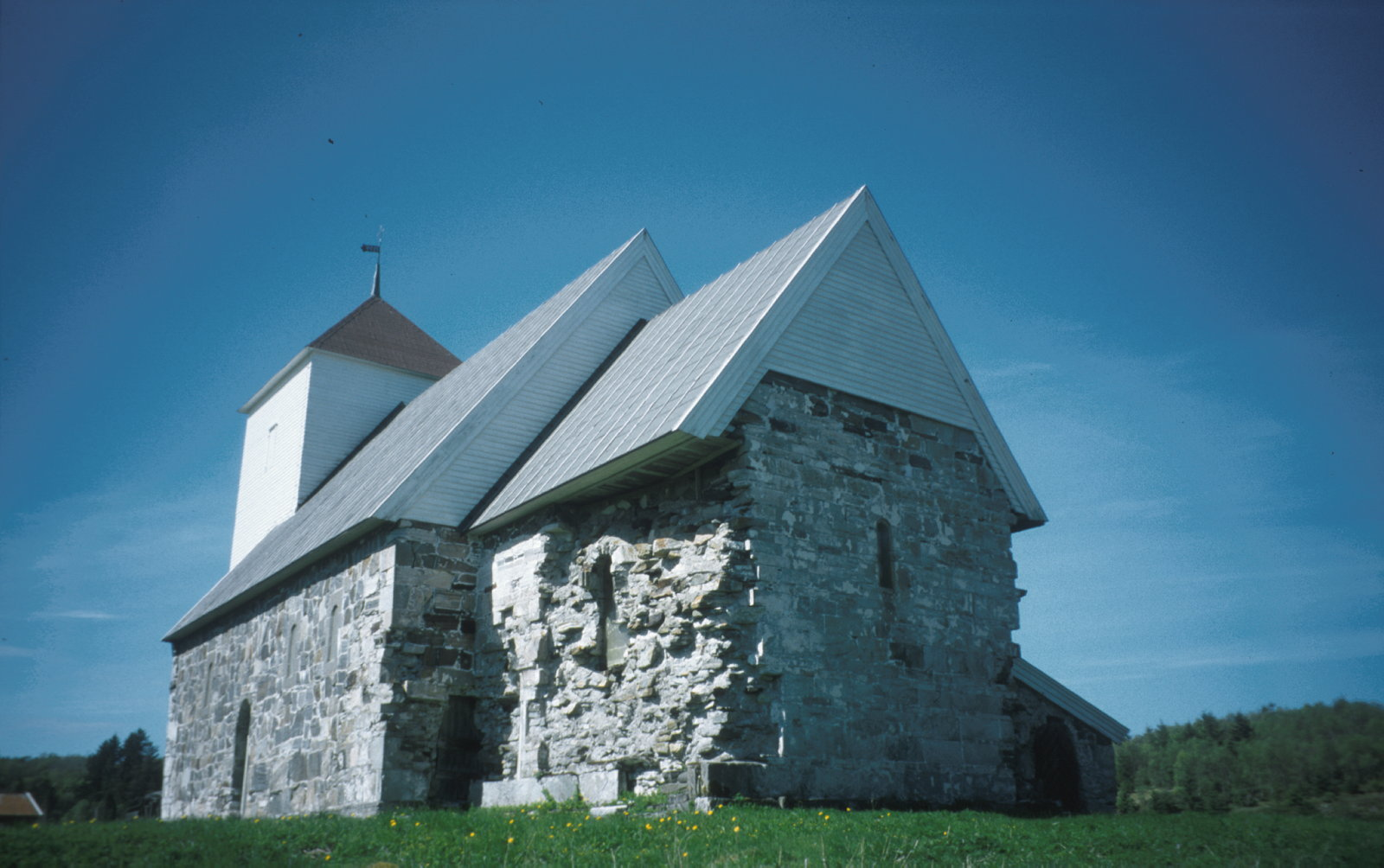

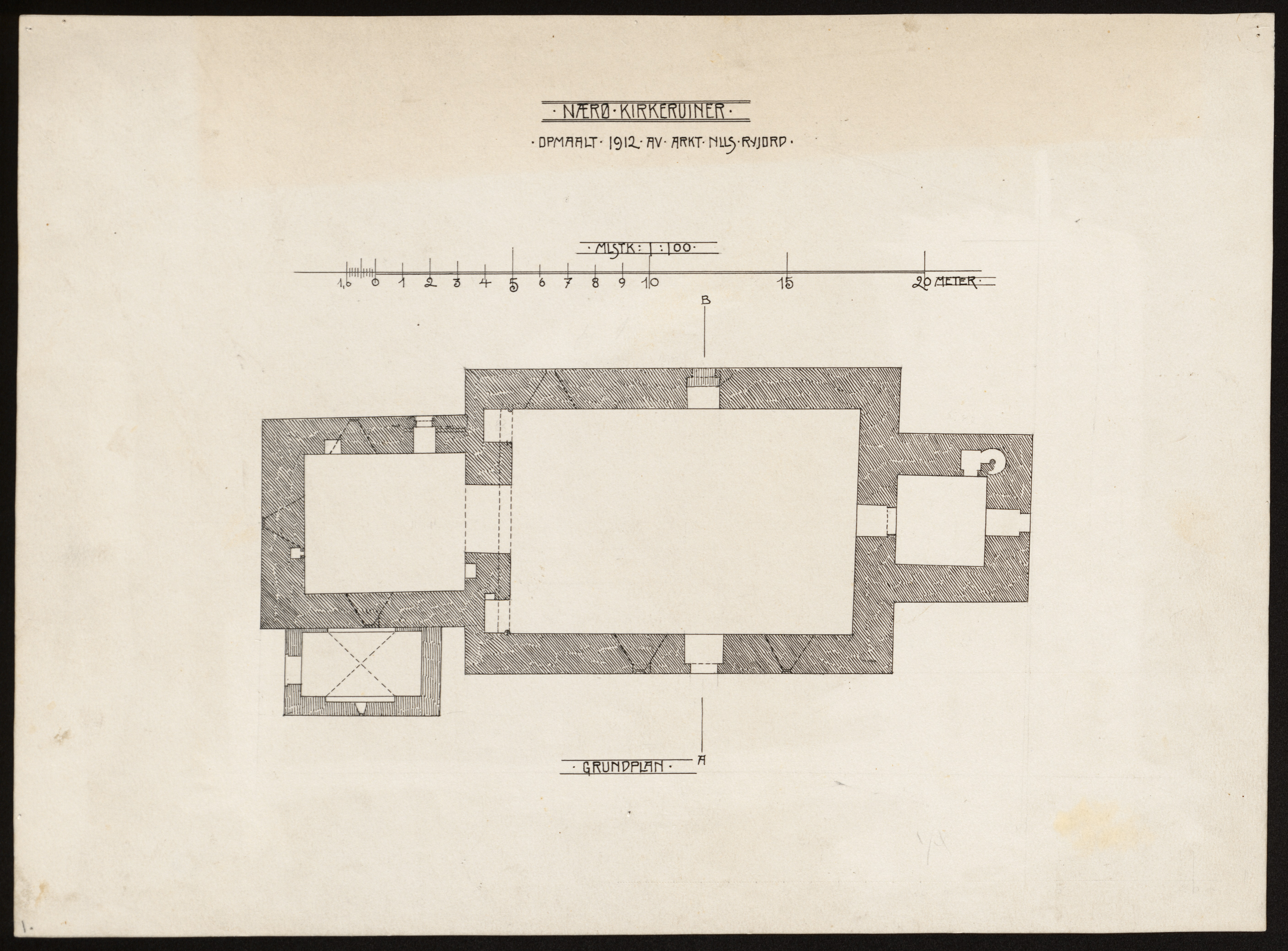

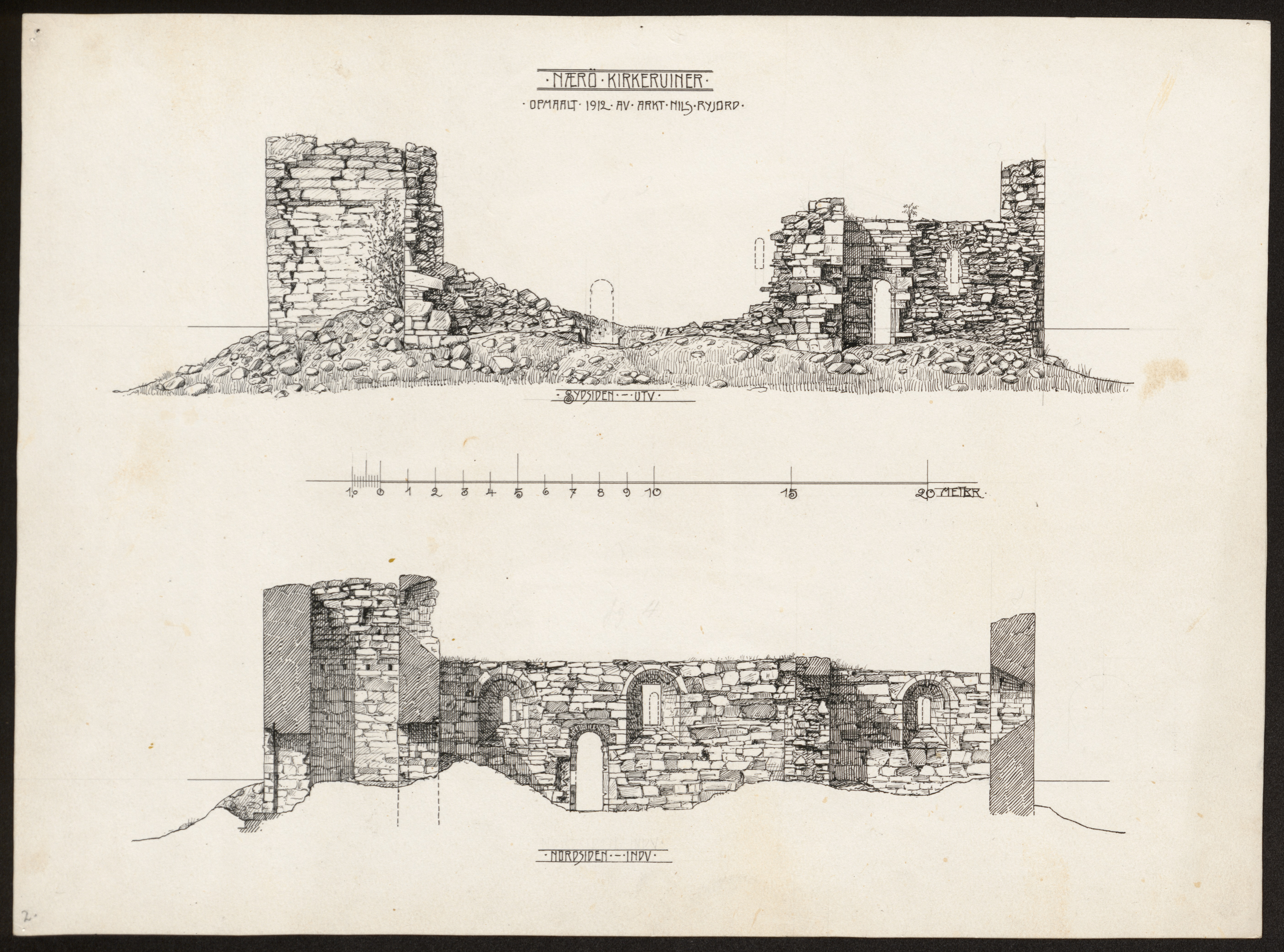

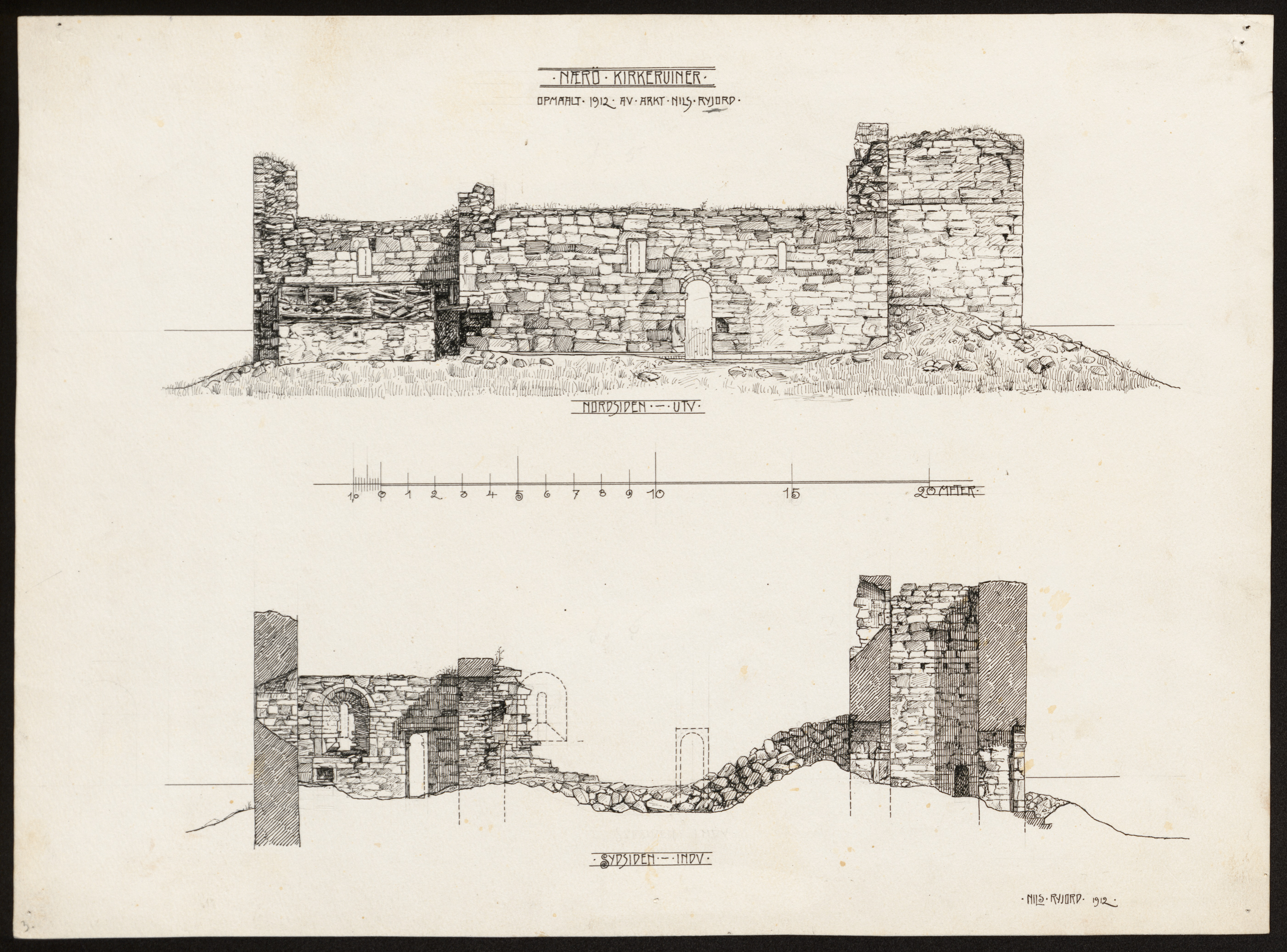

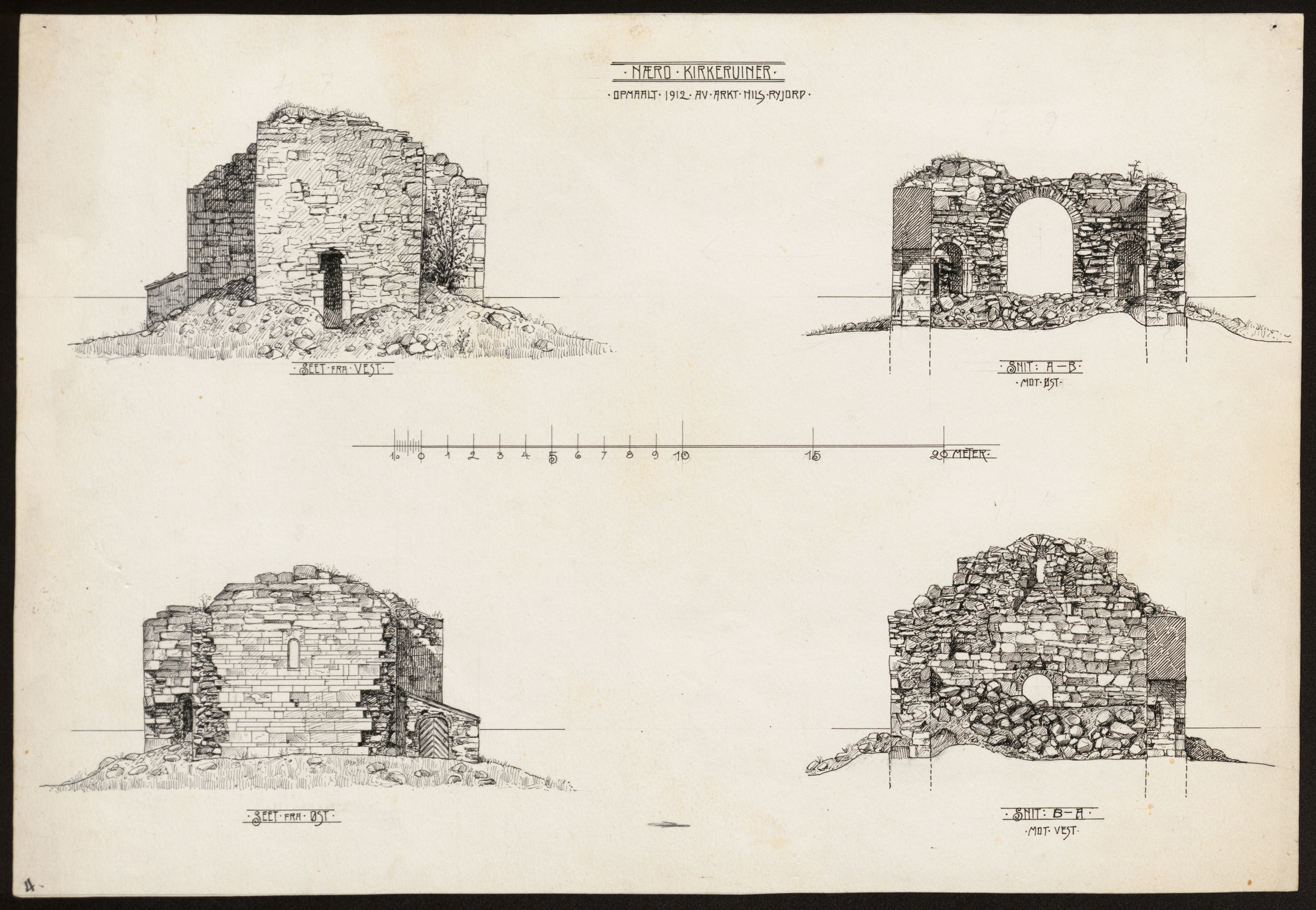

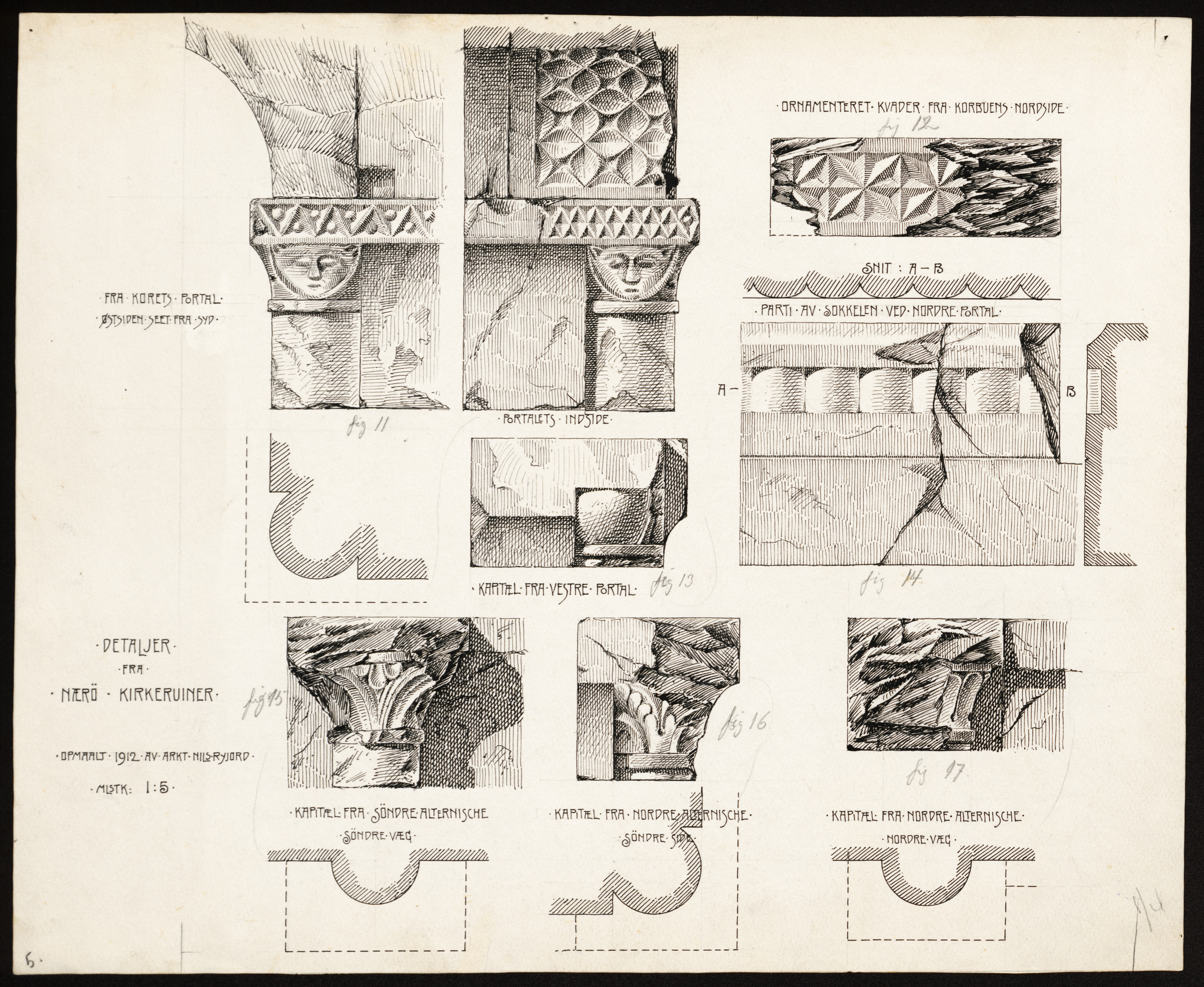

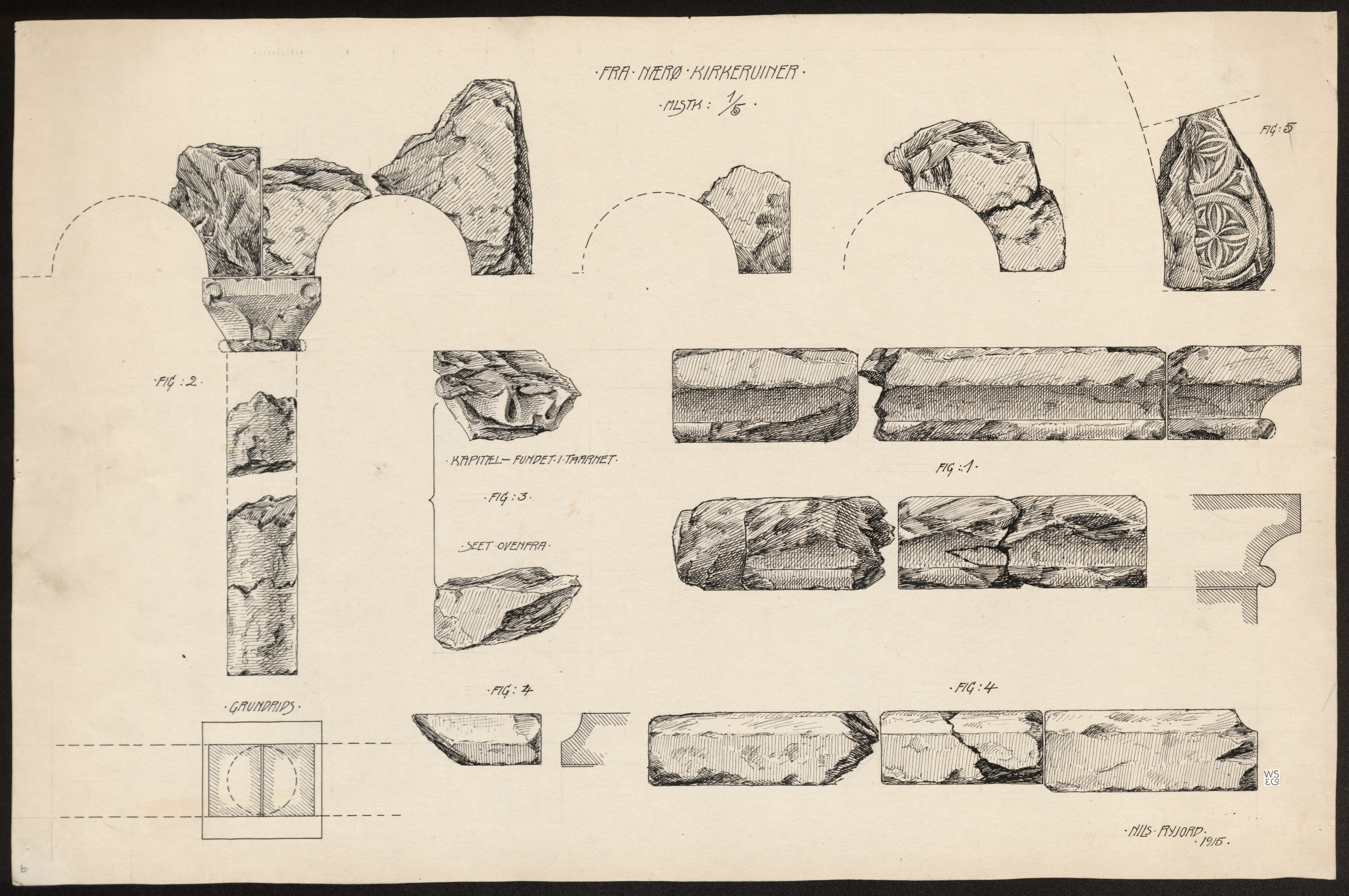

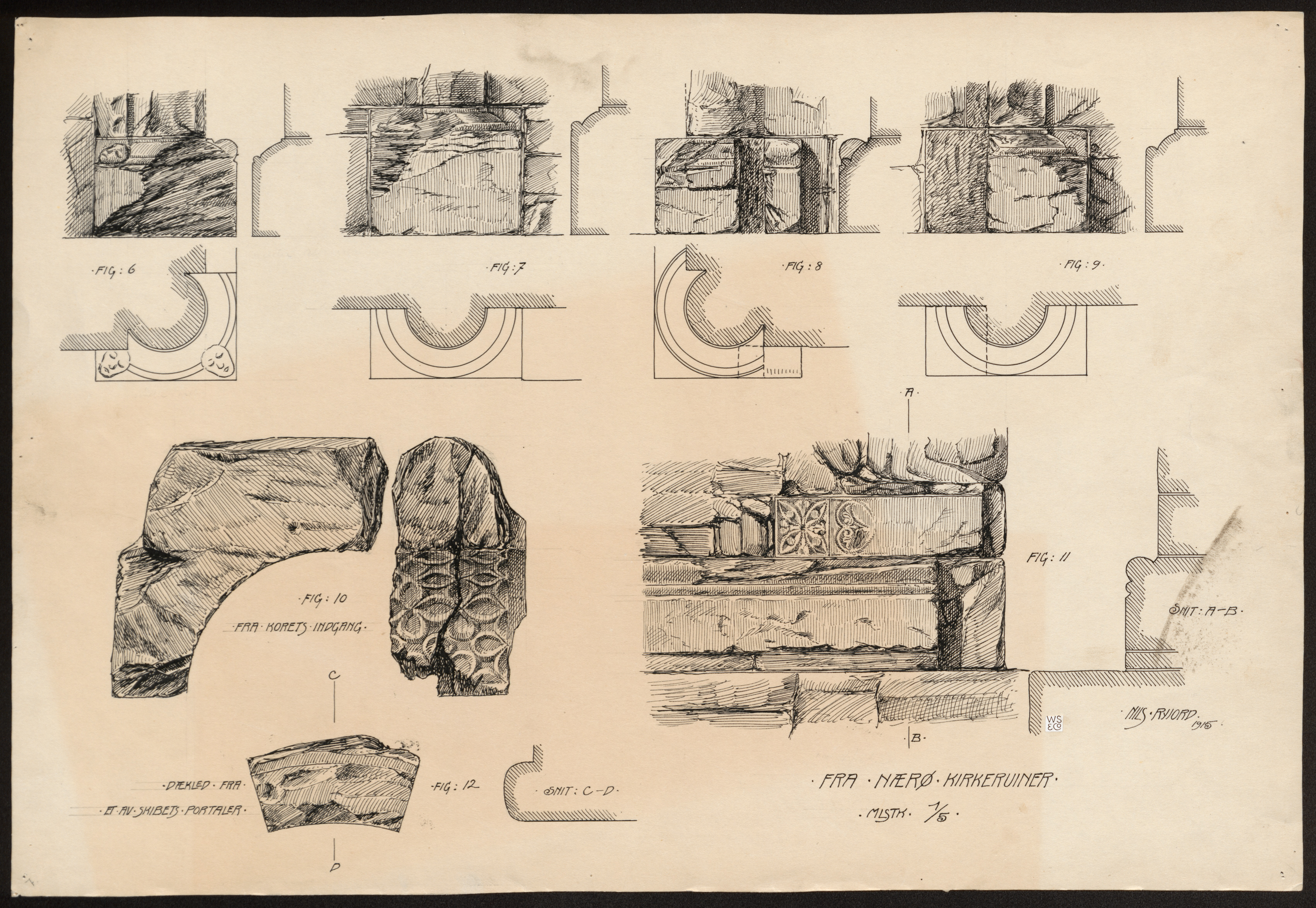

== See also ==
- List of churches in Nidaros
