= Brunvoll =

Brunvoll is a surname. Notable people with the surname include:

- Gunnar Brunvoll (1924–1999), Norwegian impresario and opera administrator
- Jonas Brunvoll Jr. (1920–1982), Norwegian opera singer and actor
- Jonas Brunvoll Sr. (1894–1969), Norwegian advertisement manager, editor and politician
- Mari Kvien Brunvoll (born 1984), Norwegian folk and jazz singer
