= Inner-Vikna =

Island in Trøndelag, Norway

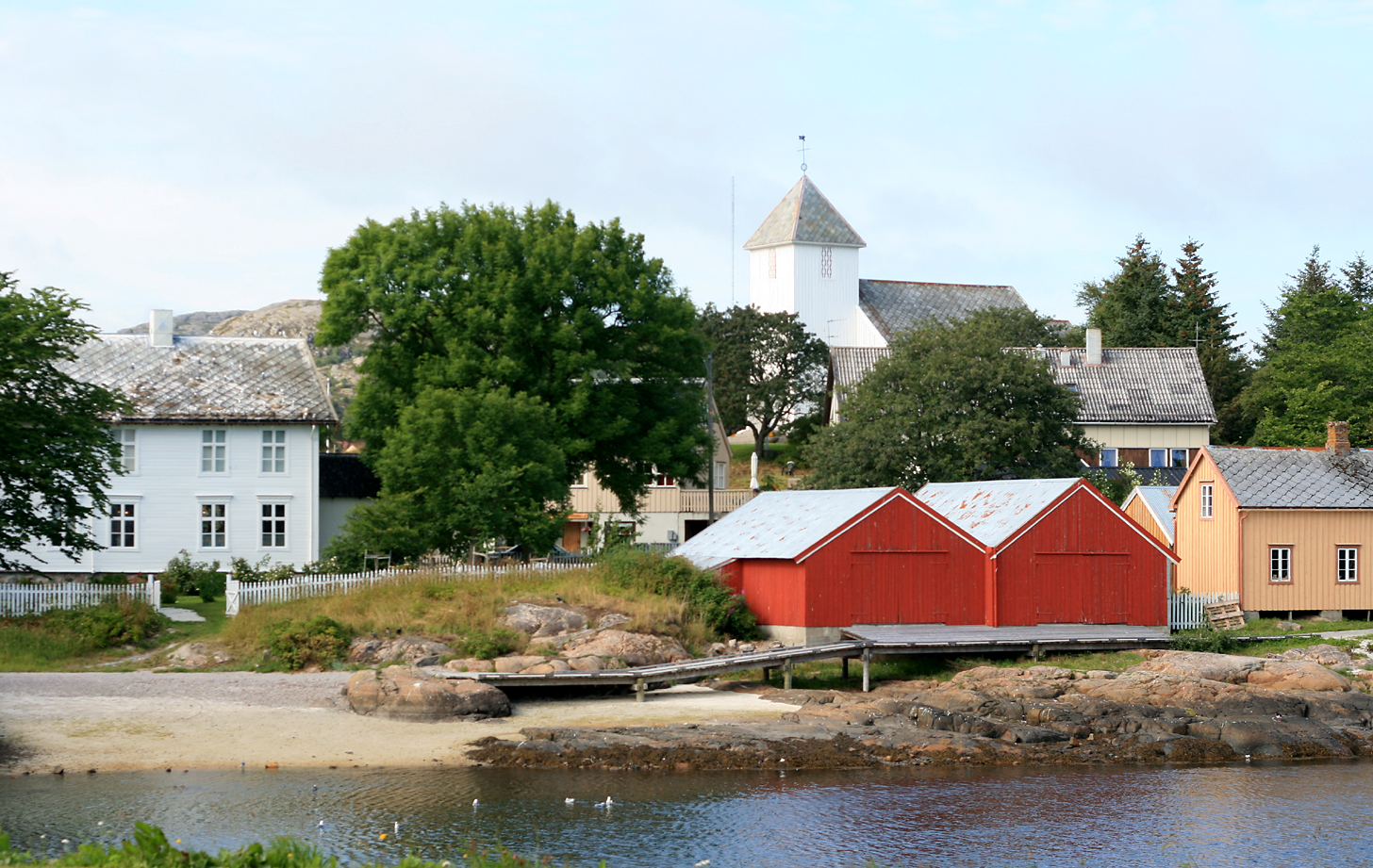
- Rørvik is located on Inner-Vikna
- Interactive map of Inner-Vikna

Geography
- Location: Trøndelag, Norway
- Coordinates: 64.8887°N 11.2403°E
- Area: 99.2 km^{2} (38.3 sq mi)
- Length: 14 km (8.7 mi)
- Width: 7.5 km (4.66 mi)
- Highest elevation: 162 m (531 ft)
- Highest point: Vattafjellet

Administration
- Norway
- County: Trøndelag
- Municipality: Nærøysund Municipality

Demographics
- Population: 3200 (2001)

Inner-Vikna is the largest of the three major islands in Nærøysund Municipality in Trøndelag county, Norway. The 99.2-square-kilometre (38.3 sq mi) island is located in the western part of the municipality and it includes the town of Rørvik, the administrative centre of Nærøysund Municipality.

Norwegian County Road 770 runs across the island, and also passing by Rørvik Airport, Ryum, then it continues over the Nærøysund Bridge and Marøysund Bridge to connect the island to the mainland. The relatively flat and barren island is separated from the mainland by the Nærøysundet strait.

== See also ==
- List of islands of Norway
