= Nærøysund Bridge =

Nærøysund Bridge Nærøysund bru
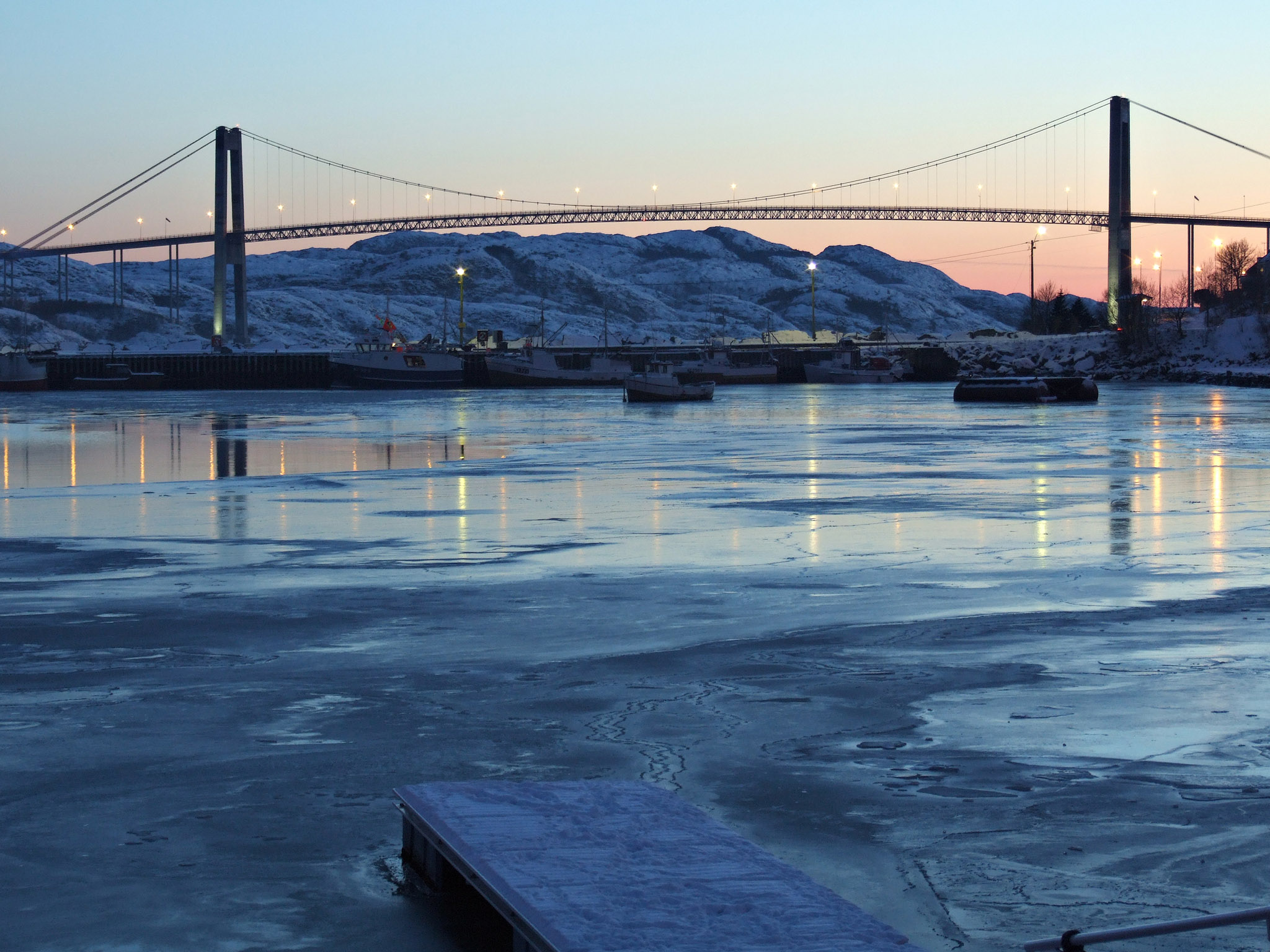
- View of the bridge
- Coordinates: 64°51′02″N 11°13′08″E
- Carries: Fv770
- Crosses: Nærøysundet
- Locale: Nærøysund Municipality

Characteristics
- Design: Suspension bridge
- Total length: 701 metres (2,300 ft)
- Longest span: 325 metres (1,066 ft)
- No. of spans: 17
- Clearance below: 41 metres (135 ft)

History
- Construction start: January 1978
- Construction end: October 1981
- Opened: 6 November 1981

The Nærøysund Bridge (Norwegian: Nærøysund bru) is a suspension bridge that crosses the Nærøysundet strait between the islands of Marøya and Inner-Vikna in Nærøysund Municipality in Trøndelag county, Norway. It is located about 1 kilometre (0.62 mi) south of the town of Rørvik. Together with the Marøysund Bridge, it connects the islands of Vikna to the mainland. The Nærøysund Bridge is 701 metres (2,300 ft) long, the main span is 325 metres (1,066 ft), and the maximum clearance to the sea is 41 metres (135 ft). The bridge has 17 spans. The Nærøysund Bridge was opened in 1981, when it briefly held the title of the world's longest cable-stay bridge.
