= Marøysund Bridge =

Marøysund Bridge Marøysund bru / Marøybrua
- Coordinates: 64°50′41″N 11°16′07″E
- Carries: Fv770
- Locale: Nærøysund Municipality, Norway

Characteristics
- Design: Cantilever bridge
- Total length: 590 metres (1,940 ft)
- Longest span: 120 metres (390 ft)

History
- Construction start: 1976
- Construction end: 1978

The Marøysund Bridge (Norwegian: Marøysund bru) is a cantilever bridge in Nærøysund Municipality in Trøndelag county, Norway. The bridge crosses the Marøysundet strait and the island of Buskholmen to connect the mainland to the island of Marøya. Together with the Nærøysund Bridge, it connects the island of Inner-Vikna to the mainland. The Marøysund Bridge is 590 metres (1,940 ft) long, with a main span of 120 metres (390 ft).

== See also ==
- List of bridges in Norway
- List of bridges in Norway by length
- List of bridges
- List of bridges by length
