= Rørvik =

Town in Nærøysund Municipality, Norway

- Town/City
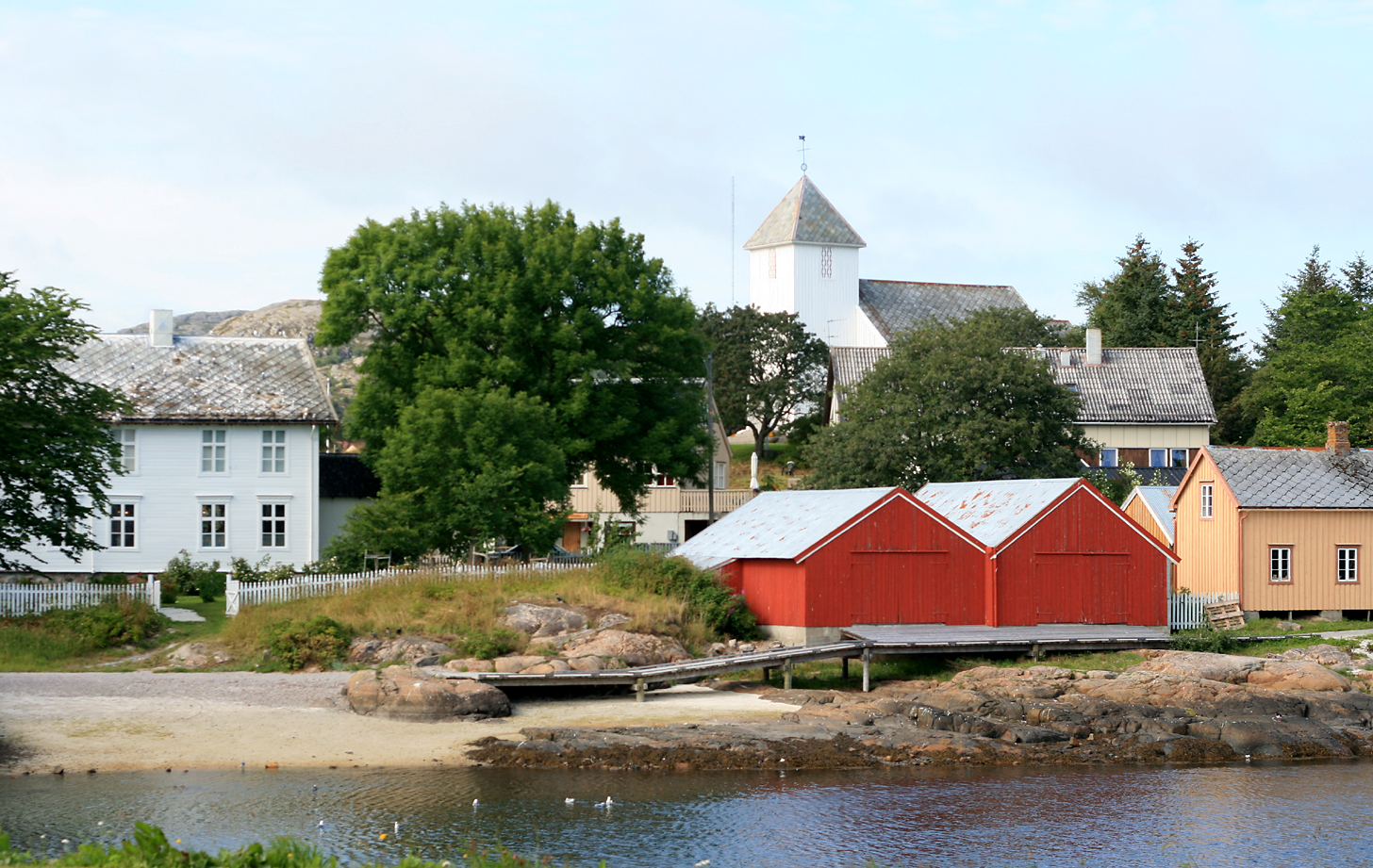
- View of the old town (Berggården)
- Interactive map of Rørvik
- Location within Trøndelag Location within Norway
- Coordinates: 64.8619°N 11.2397°E
- Country: Norway
- Region: Central Norway
- County: Trøndelag
- District: Namdalen
- Municipality: Nærøysund Municipality
- Established as
- Town (By): 2020

Area
  - Total: 2.23 km^{2} (0.86 sq mi)
- Elevation: 3 m (9.8 ft)

Population (2024)
  - Total: 3,743
  - Density: 1,678/km^{2} (4,350/sq mi)
- Time zone: UTC+01:00 (CET)
  - Summer (DST): UTC+02:00 (CEST)
- Post Code: 7900 Rørvik

Rørvik is a town and administrative centre in Nærøysund Municipality in Trøndelag county, Norway. It is on the eastern side of the Vikna archipelago on the island of Inner-Vikna. The 2.23-square-kilometre (550-acre) town has a population (2024) of 3,743 and a population density of 1,678 inhabitants per square kilometre (4,350/sq mi).

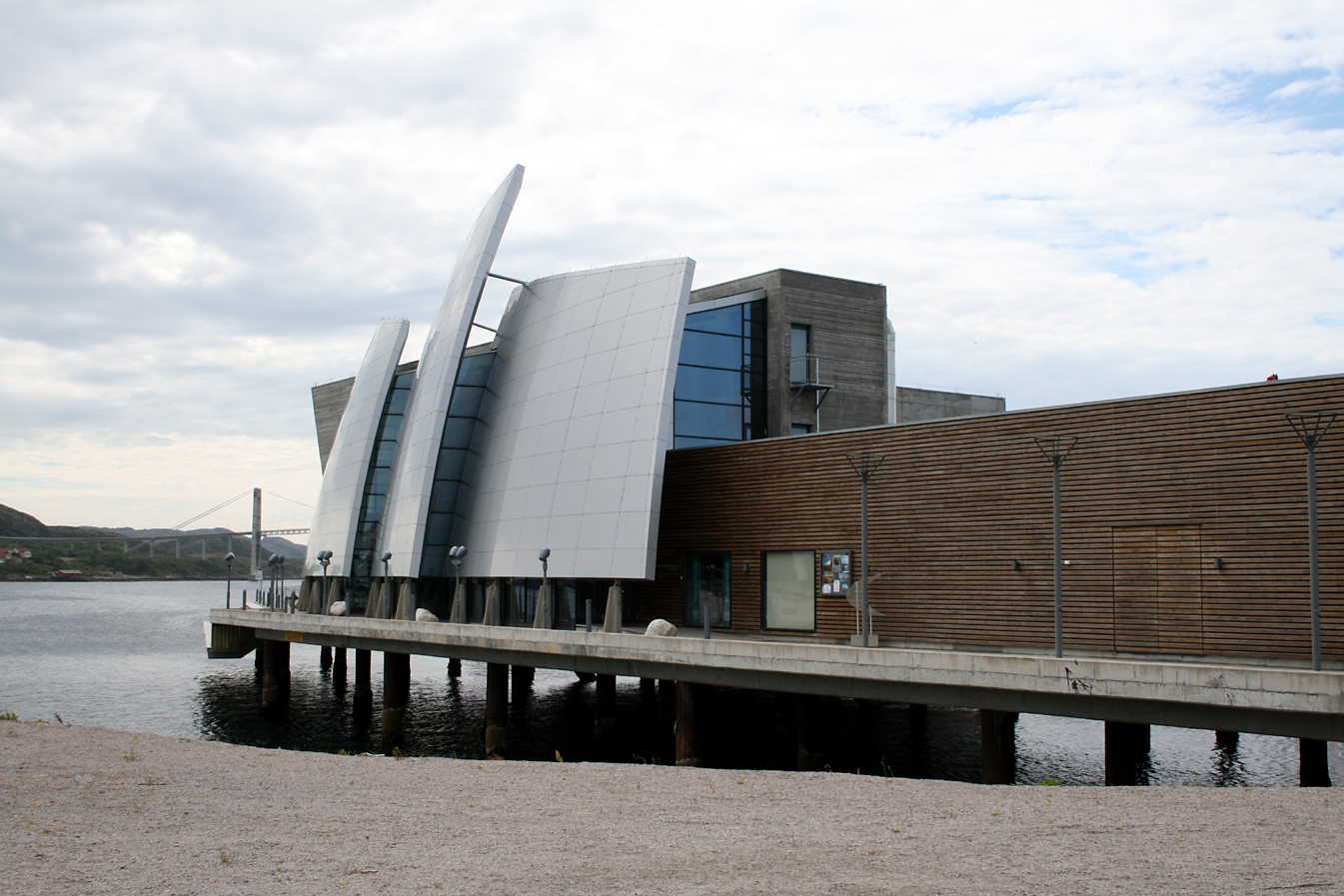
Norveg

There are several museums in Rørvik. The Norwegian Coastal Museum, with its center for coastal culture and vessel protection, is located here. The critically acclaimed museum building Norveg was designed by the architect Guðmundur Jónsson. Rørvik is also home to the Ytre Namdal Upper Secondary School, Ytre Namdal Vocational School for maritime education and the Safety Center Rørvik which offers safety training for seafarers.

Old Rørvik church from 1896 burned to the ground in 2012, and new Rørvik Church, designed by the architectural firm Pir2, was consecrated on 22 December 2019. There is a hotel (Kysthotellet) and an apartment hotel (Rørvik rorbuer) in Rørvik. Prior to 2020, the town served as the administrative centre of the old Vikna Municipality.

== Geography ==
The town is located in the northwestern part of Trøndelag county in central Norway, approximately 200 kilometres (120 mi) north of the city of Trondheim (320 kilometres or 200 miles by road). Rørvik lies at the eastern part of the Vikna archipelago, on the Inner-Vikna island at the western shore of the Nærøysundet strait, facing the mainland on the eastern shore of the strait. The climate is maritime, and many private gardens have plum and apple trees even here at a latitude of 65°N.

== History ==
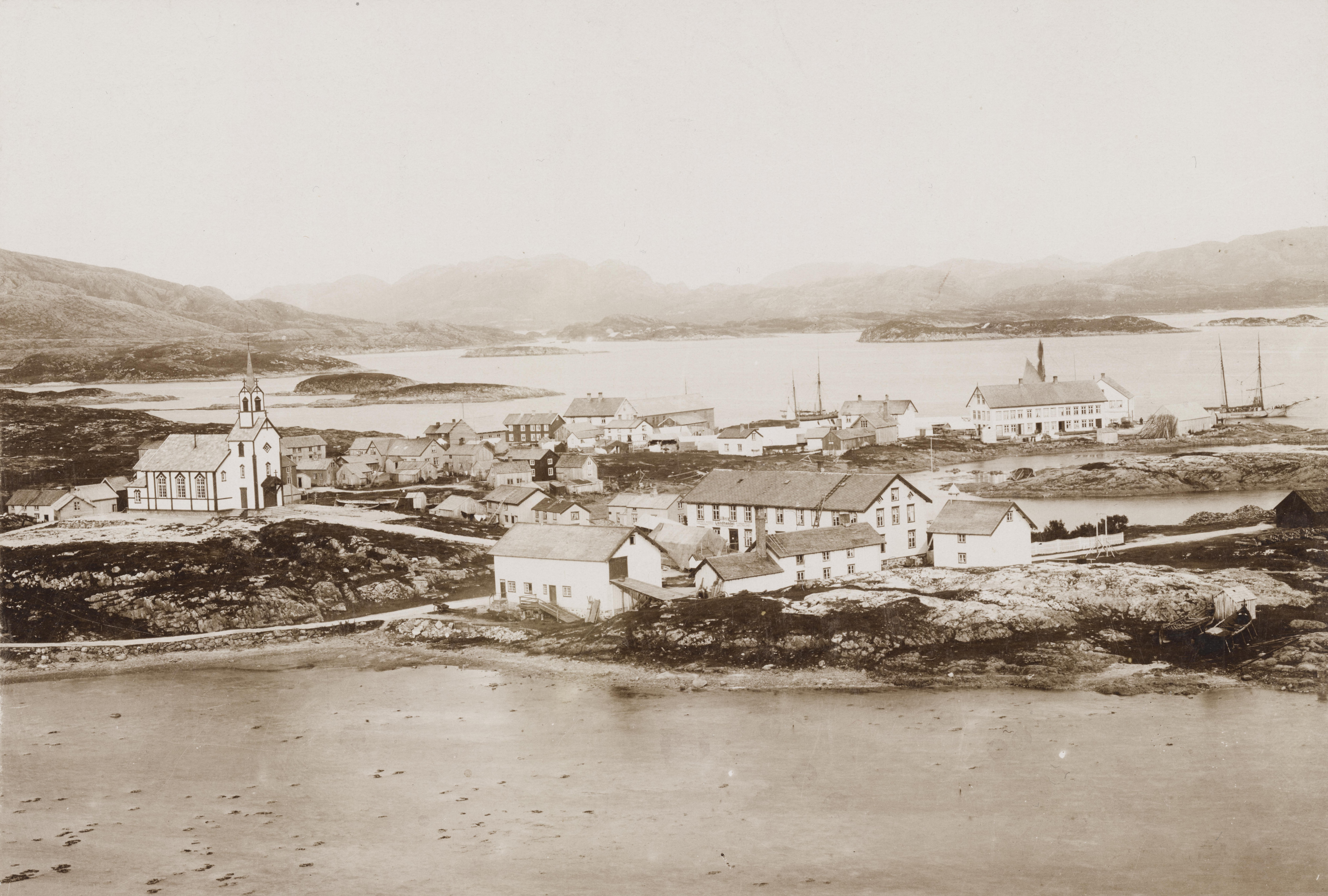
Rørvik 1898

This area was early settled, and there are several prehistoric burial mounds. Among the rocky slopes and cliffs on the islands are many surprisingly lush lowland fields, and farming and fishing were the traditional ways of life, as they partly still are.

At the census in 1701, there were only four households in Rørvik. When the state established a postal and passenger route in northern Norway in 1838 served by steamships, they were dispatched at Kråkøya, which is located 4 kilometres (2.5 mi) north of Rørvik. When Rørvik became a shuttle provider in 1859, the merchant on Kråkøya wanted a shuttle provider to be established on the east side of the strait in Nærøy Municipality, but the municipal council of the municipality did not agree to it, instead they recommended that the port of call for the steamships be moved to Rørvik, something that happened in 1863. The post office was also moved there in 1866. Rørvik thus grew up as a town connected to the sea and communications. In addition, there was a trading post with merchants such as Johan Berg and Paul Anzjøn and somewhat later the Holand and Fossaa families as the largest merchants. The state withdrew from steamship traffic in the 1860s and private shipping companies took over with boats built for freight traffic. Rørvik was called at by Hurtigruten from the start in 1893. In addition, there were a number of accommodation and restaurants. The Czech author and journalist Karel Čapek described the place in transit in 1936: "Rørvik, the first small town on an island; inhabited by a number of small wooden houses, including three hotels, ten cafes and an editorial office for the local newspaper."

The subsidy schemes for the establishment of new small farms in Norway contributed to several of the islands in Vikna Municipality being populated as late as the 1930s. A few years later, in 1947, the first of the families moved from Ytter-Vikna to Rørvik. The migration flow that occurred in the years that followed fell into three categories: those who moved completely out of the district and traveled to one of the industrial sites; those who moved to Rørvik and got work there; and those who moved to Rørvik, but continued to fish in the areas they came from. Before 1955, only Rørvik had access to electricity from a public electricity supplier, and the power lines became decisive for much of the settlement. The development of the road network, distance to public services such as schools, and relocation grants and offers of building-ready plots in Rørvik, were also important reasons why people moved.

Rørvik was served by the Ottersøy–Rørvik Ferry from 1929 until the opening of the Nærøysund Bridge on 6 November 1981. The opening of the mainland connection at Fylkesvei 770 and Rørvik Airport, Ryum in the 1970s and 1980s laid the foundation for a new upswing in trade and service industries in Rørvik. In the 1970s, the first experiments with aquaculture also began in the region, which already during the 1980s and 1990s became an important industry.

== Economy ==
The port of Rørvik is the largest port facility in Central Norway with over 15,000 ship calls each year. Rørvik is also a port of call for a number of cruise ships. Significant industries are ship-related industry, fishing, and commercial salmon fish farming. Some work in public service. Telenor is an employer (as of 2024).

== Transportation ==
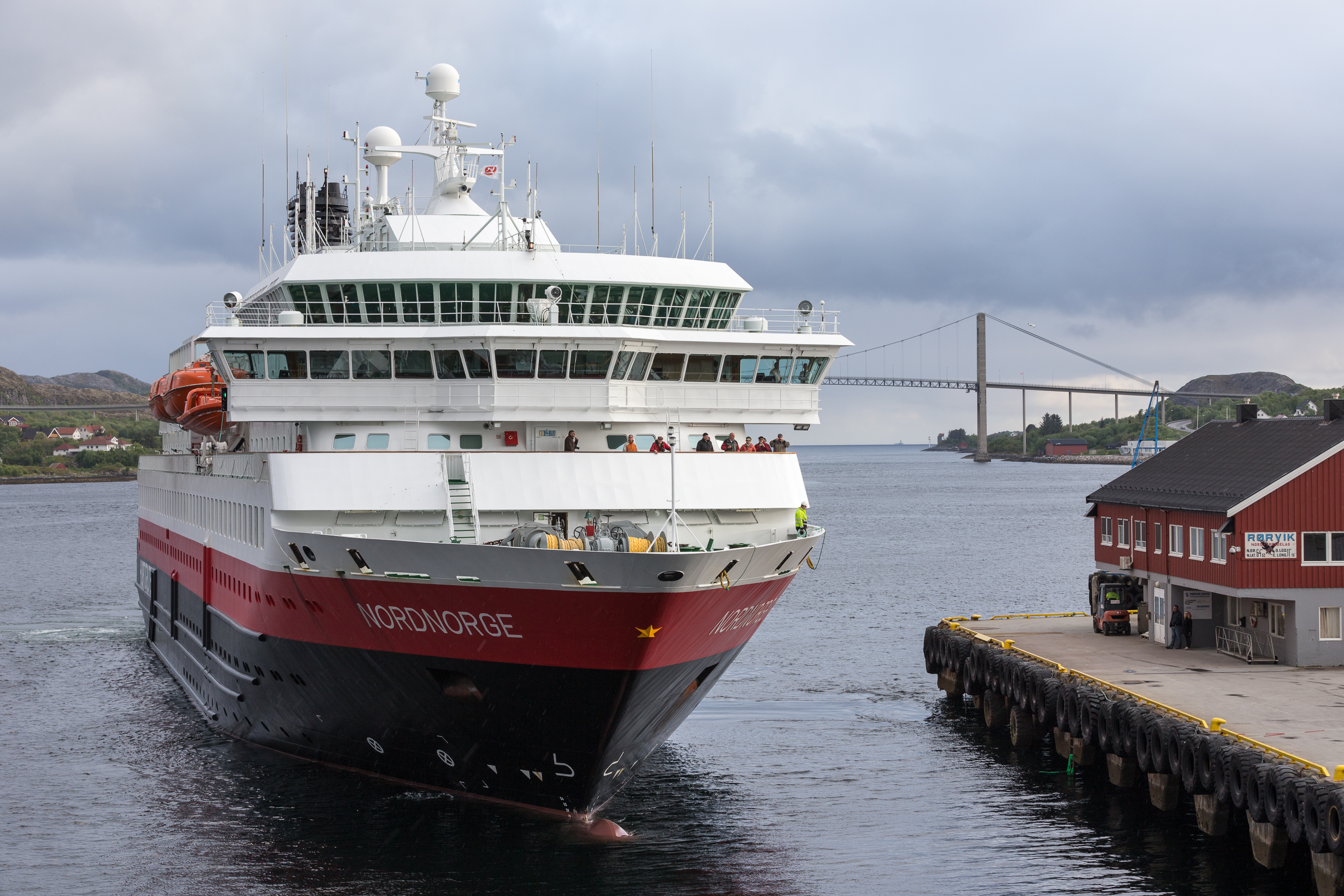
MS Nordnorge arrives in Rørvik

Rørvik is a port of call of the Hurtigruten coastal steamer, and the northbound and southbound ships meet in Rørvik in the evening.

Vikna has been accessible by car from the mainland since 1981 when the Nærøysund Bridge and Marøysund Bridge on Norwegian County Road 770 was completed. There are bus routes to Namsos, Brønnøysund, and Grong (train station). The speedboat Namdalingen runs three times daily to town of Namsos, the regional center.

Rørvik Airport, Ryum is located just south of Rørvik, and it serves the region of Ytre Namdalen.

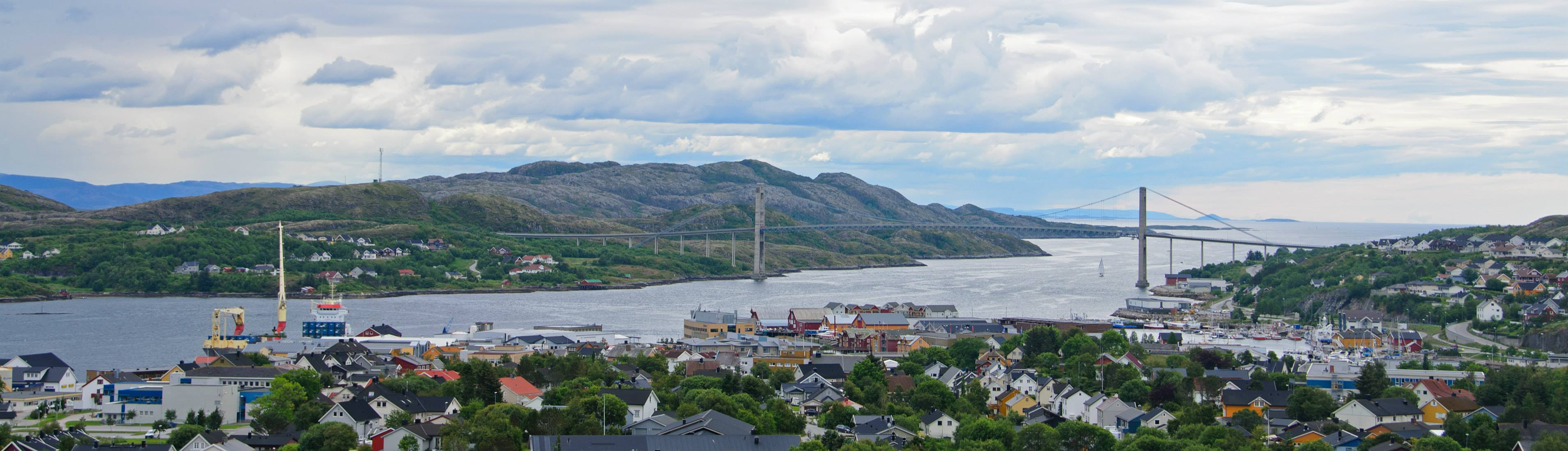

== Culture ==
The Coastal Museum Norveg, with a center for coastal culture and ship protection, is located in Rørvik. The critically acclaimed museum building was designed by the architect Guðmundur Jónsson. The museum also owns Berggården in the center of Rørvik, and together with Nærøysund municipality they manage most of the historically important buildings in the vacated fishing village of Sør-Gjæslingan. The Sør-Gjæslingan fishery consists of approx. 80 islands, islets and reefs. In its time, this was one of the largest and most important fishing villages south of Lofoten, where several thousand fishermen could gather during the season. Sør-Gjæslingan was protected as a national cultural environment in October 2010. It is possible to go on a day trip to Sør-Gjæslingan by boat, and it is possible to spend the night there in simple rorbues. For those who come with their own boat, it is possible to dock at the guest quay at Flatholmen.

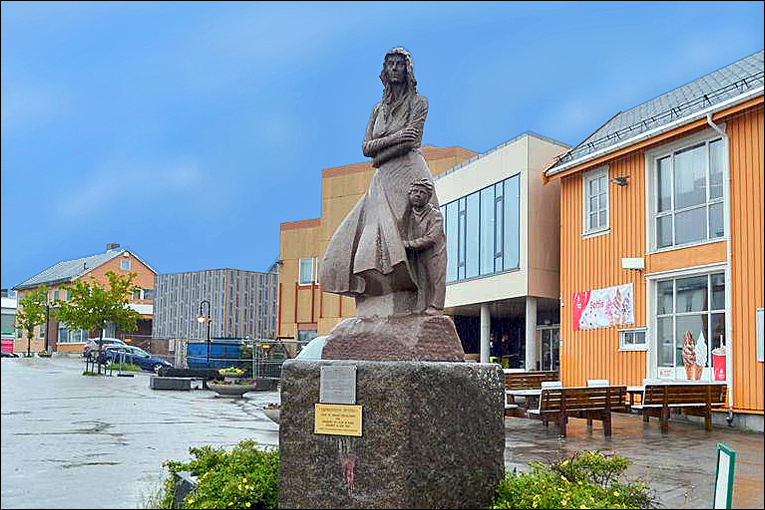
"The Sailors Wife" / The Old Town Square

The display center for aquaculture is a collaboration between Kystmuseet Norveg and SalmoNor AS and conveys the development of the modern Norwegian aquaculture industry. In the permanent exhibition in Norveg, there is a section on aquaculture and it is also possible to join a boat trip to a modern salmon farm. The sea-based part is with the viewing boat MS Sunniva, which has regular viewing trips in the summer. These trips go to a modern aquaculture facility where guides are responsible for tours of the facility, and it is possible to experience the salmon up close.

The Skreifestivalen is a festival that focuses on the appreciation of both food and coastal culture that has been celebrated yearly in Rørvik since 1998. One of the highlights of this festival is a walking outdoor theater play *Rørvik... the first small town on an island..*, which tells the story of the coastal town of Rørvik in 1907.

Rørvikdagan with music festival, martna, fun fair and other activities is organized every year in July

== Media gallery ==
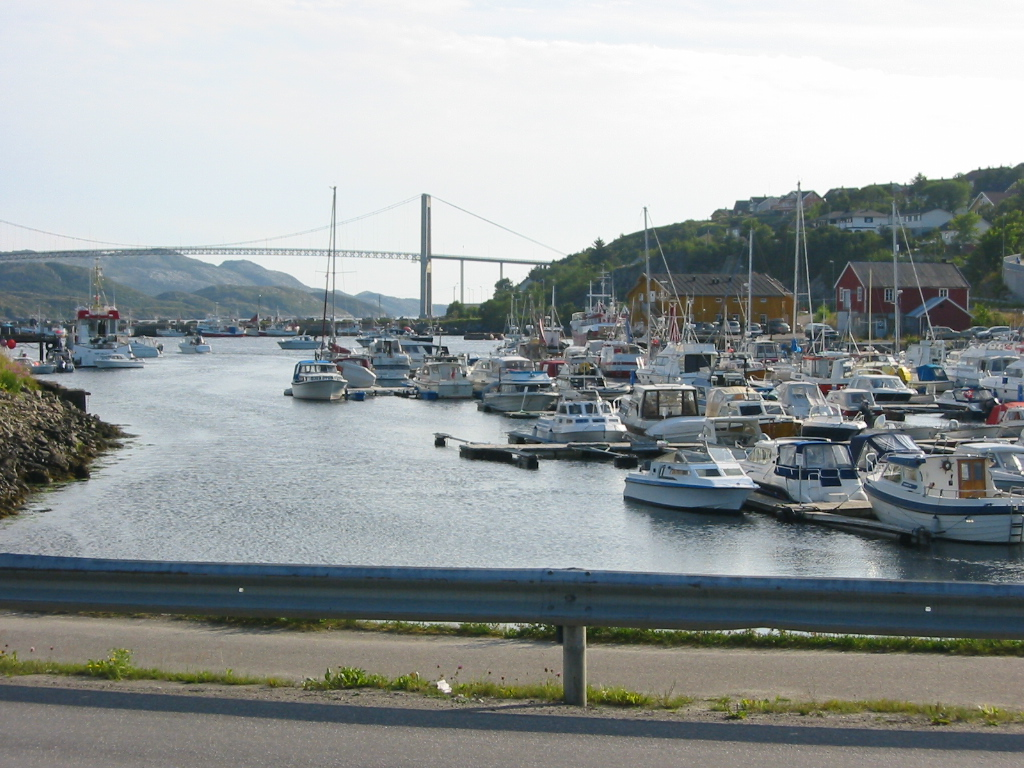
Rørvik, July 28, 2006

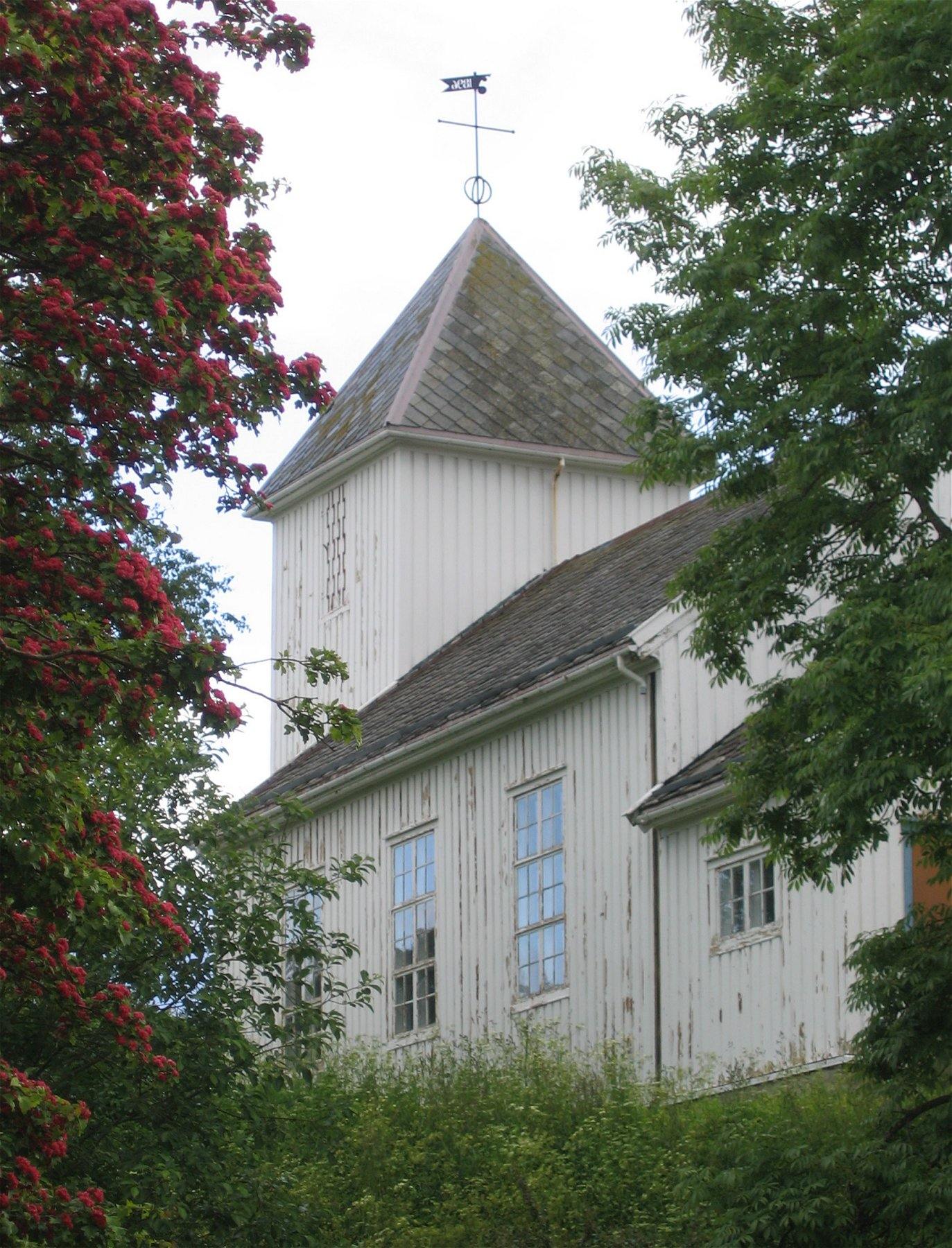
Rørvik Church

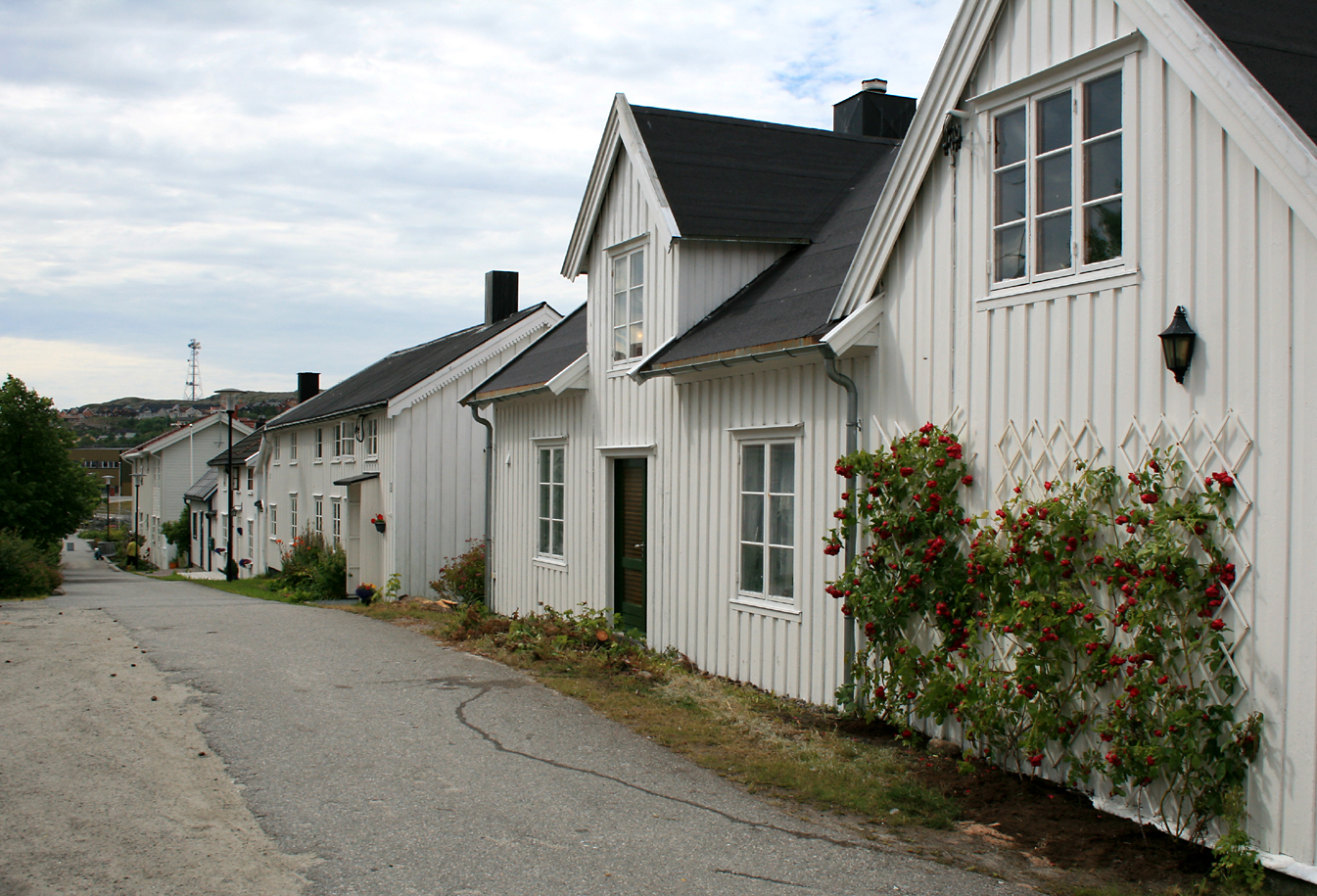
Torggata (street)
