= Nærøysundet =

Fjord in Trøndelag, Norway

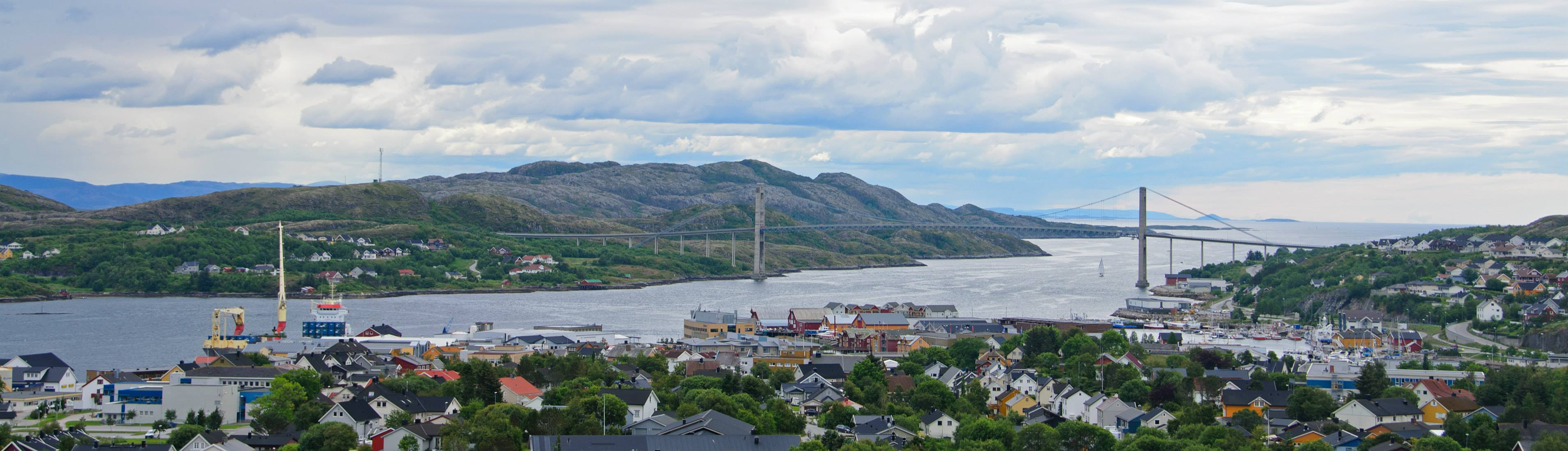
- View over the southern part of Nærøysundet with the crossing Nærøysund Bridge
- Interactive map of the fjord
- Location: Trøndelag county, Norway
- Coordinates: 64.842°N 11.200°E
- Type: Strait
- Primary inflows: Folda
- Basin countries: Norway
- Max. length: 20 kilometres (12 mi)

Nærøysundet is a strait in Nærøysund Municipality in Trøndelag county, Norway. The village of Rørvik, is located along the Nærøysundet, on the northwestern side. The 20-kilometre (12 mi) strait is crossed by the Nærøysund Bridge which connects the mainland and the island of Inner-Vikna. The shipping lane along the Norwegian coast passes through the strait, and the ship traffic is guided by the Nærøysund Lighthouse.
