= MS Leka (2001) =

Vehicle ferry

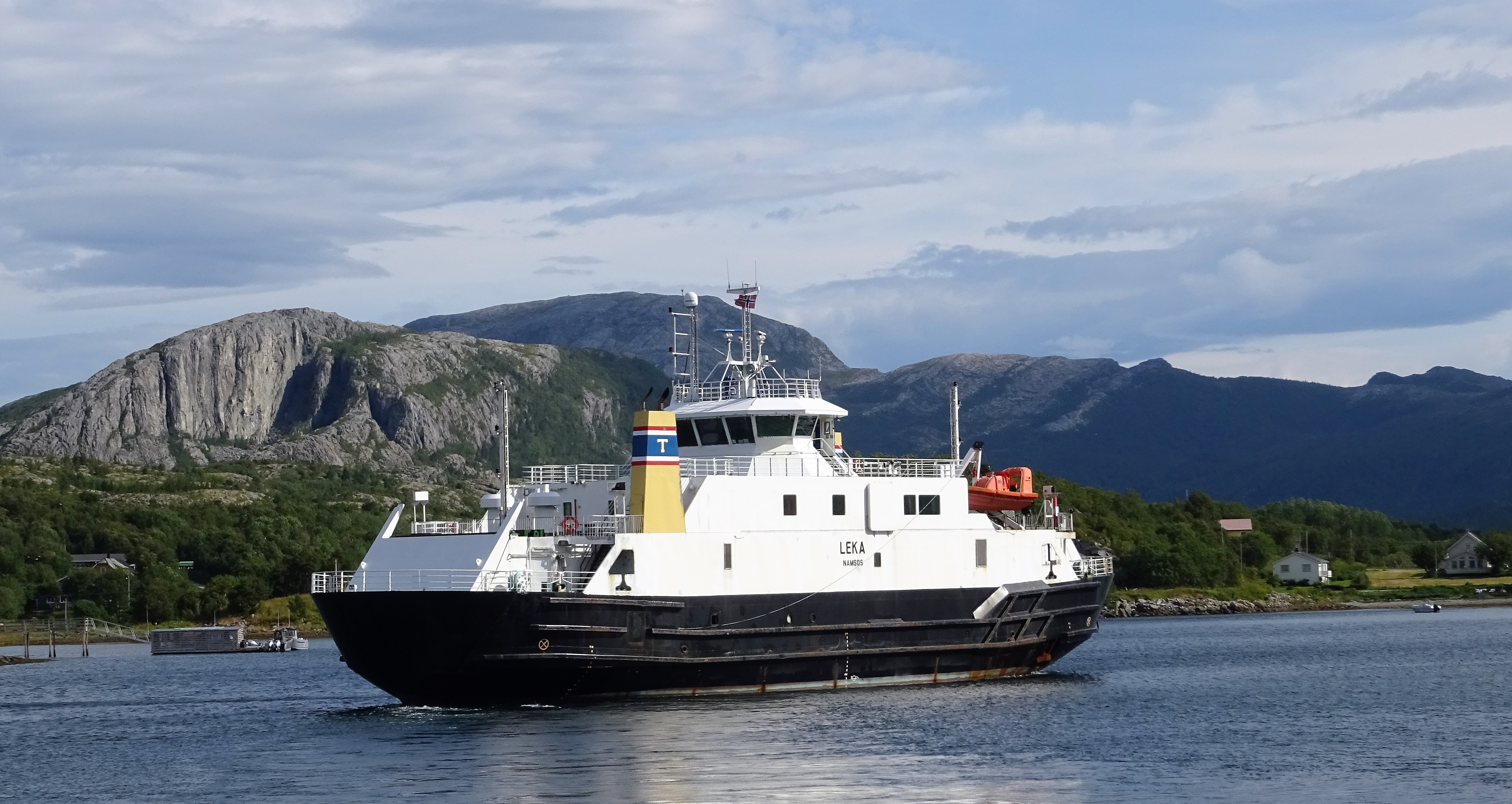

History
- Name: Leka
- Owner: Torghatten Trafikkselskap (2001–2022); Torghatten Midt (2022–)
- Operator: Lekaferja (2001–); Torghatten Trafikkselskap (–2022); Torghatten Midt (2022–)
- Port of registry: Brønnøysund Norway
- Route: Skei–Gutvik
- Builder: Cammell Laird
- Yard number: 2001
- Launched: 8 February 2001
- Completed: 6 June 2001
- Identification: IMO number: 9230866; Call sign: LLJM
- Status: In service

General characteristics
- Type: Vehicle and passenger ferry
- Tonnage: 1744 GT
- Length: 48.50 m (159 ft 1 in)
- Beam: 13.20 m (43 ft 4 in)
- Draught: 5.00 m (16 ft 5 in)
- Installed power: 934 kW (1270 hp)
- Propulsion: 2x Mitsubishi S12A2-MPTK diesel engines
- Speed: 12 knots (22 km/h; 14 mph)
- Capacity: 38 passenger car units; 99 passengers

MS Leka is a roll-on/roll-off passenger and road vehicle ferry in service with Torghatten Midt. Built by Cammell Laird in 2001, she has served her whole career as the Skei–Gutvik Ferry.

== Specifications ==
Leka is a steel roll-on/roll-off passenger and road vehicle ferry. She measures 55.8 meters (183 ft) in length, has a beam of 13.2 meters (43 ft) and a draght of 5.0 meters (16.4 ft). Her tonnage is 345 deadweight, 1744 gross, 1942 gross registered and 709 net registered. She has a capacity for 99 passengers and 38 passenger car equivalents.

She has two Mitsubishi S12A2-MPTK four-stroke, V12 diesel engines. This gives her a power of 934 kW (1270 hp) and a cruise speed of 12 knots (22 km/h; 14 mph). She is bi-directional and fully enclosed, with a passenger lounge above the car deck.

== History ==
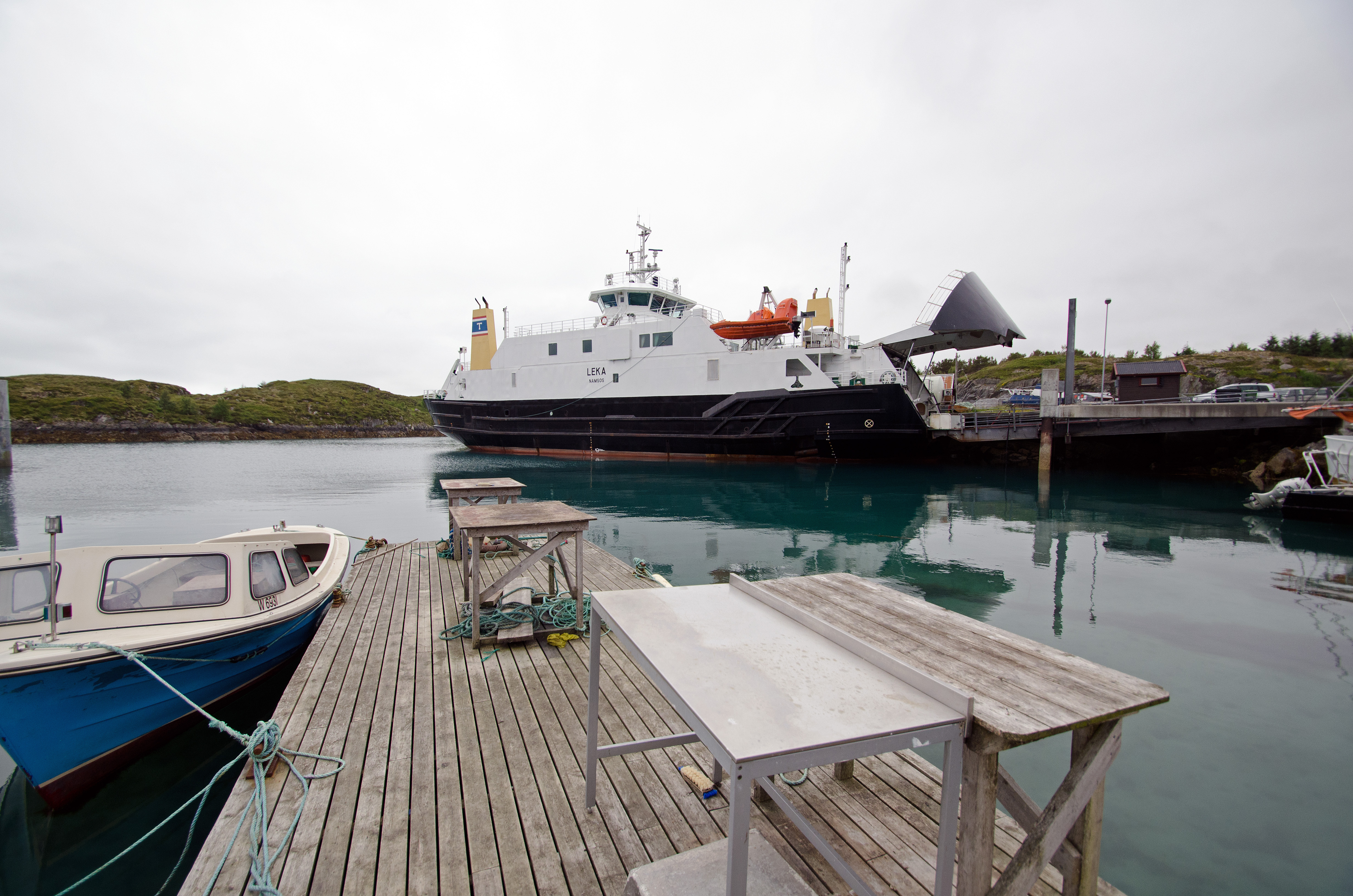
Leka docked at quay at Skei

By the turn of the millennium, traffic had grown sufficiently on the crossing between Skei and Gutvik, that the incumbent ferry Leka II was becoming too small. Both ferry quays had a sharp turn right at the dock, meaning the ferry had to make a tight manoeuvre every time it docked. This meant that standard ferry classes would not be able to handle the route. Lekaferja therefore had to order a bespoke design. In particular, the ferry needed to be equipped with azimuth propellers.

The ferry was built at the Hebburn Shipyard in Newcastle upon Tyne, United Kingdom, by Cammell Laird. Leka was launched on 18th February 2001 and delivered to Lekaferja on 6th June. She was soon put in service on the Skei–Gutvik crossing of Lekafjorden. Although operated by Lekaferja, she was registered with Torghatten Trafikkselskap, who had bought out long-time owner Rolf Østby the year before. Lekaferja was later merged into Torghatten. Through a corporate merger, ownership and operation of the ferry passed to Torghatten Midt in 2022.
