= MS Solfjord =

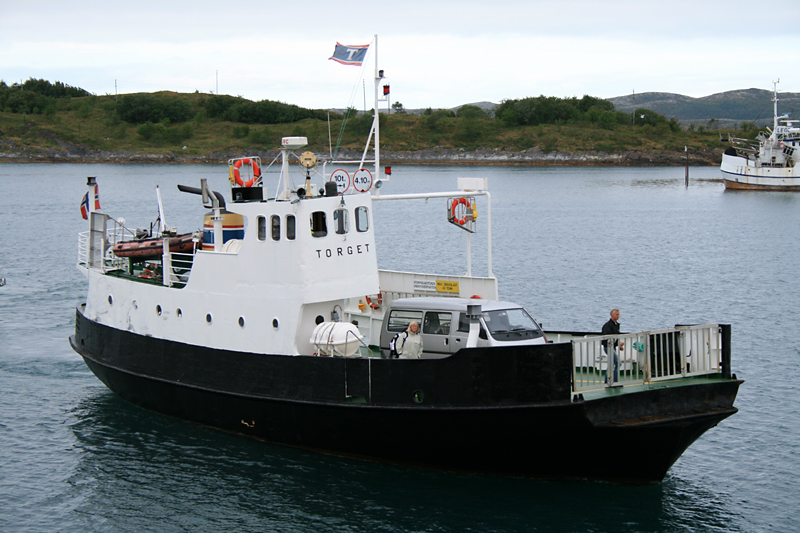
- Torget in Brønnøysund in 2007

History
- Name: MS Leka (1963–92); Torget (1992–2022); Solfjord (2022–)
- Owner: Rolf Østby (1963–92); Torghatten Trafikkselskap (1992–2022); Vidar Hop Skyssbåter (2022–)
- Port of registry: Namsos (1963–92), Norway; Brønnøysund (1992–2022), Norway; Solund (2022–), Norway
- Route: Skei–Gutvik Ferry (1963–92); Brønnøysund–Sauren/Stortorgnes Ferry (1992–2022)
- Builder: Ulstein Mekaniske Verksted
- Yard number: 23U
- Launched: 23 November 1963
- Christened: 23 November 1963
- Completed: 1963
- Identification: Call sign: LHJY; MMSI: 257010700

General characteristics
- Type: Vehicle and passenger ferry
- Tonnage: 99 GT, 32 NT
- Length: 23.18 m (76 ft 1 in)
- Beam: 7.25 m (23 ft 9 in)
- Draught: 2.58 m (8 ft 6 in)
- Installed power: 239 kW (375 hp)
- Propulsion: Caterpillar diesel engine
- Speed: 9 knots (17 km/h; 10 mph)
- Capacity: 10 passenger car units; 48 passengers

MS Solfjord is a passenger and road vehicle ferry in service with Vidar Hop Skyssbåter since 2022. Built by Ulstein Mekaniske Verksted in 1963, she measures 23.18 meters (76.0 ft) long, 7.25 meters (23.8 ft) wide and has a gross tonnage of 99 metric tonnes. The motor ship has a capacity for 10 passenger car unit and 48 passengers.

Originally named MS Leka, she was built by Ulstein Mekaniske Verksted for Rolf Østby and was used as the first vessel on the Skei–Gutvik Ferry. She was sold to Torghatten Trafikkselskap in 1992, who put her into operation on the Brønnøysund–Sauren/Stortorgnes Ferry and named her MS Torget. She was sold to Vidar Hop Skyssbåter in 2022, when she got her current name.

== Speficiations ==
The steel ship has a length of 23.18 meters (76 ft 1 in), a width of 7.25 meters (23 ft 9 in), and a drought of 2.58 meters (8 ft 6 in). She has a gross tonnage of 98 metric tonnes and a net tonnage of 32 metric tonnes. Her Caterpillar diesel engine has a power rating of 239 kilowatts (375 hp). giving her a cruise speed of 9 knots (17 km/h; 10 mph). She had a capacity for 10 passenger car units, and 48 passengers.

== History ==
The ship was ordered by Rolf Østby as the first vessel to operate the Skei–Gutvik Ferry in Leka Municipality, Norway. Originally named MS Leka, she was built by Ulstein Mekaniske Verksted in Ulsteinvik as build number 23U. Her port of registry while with Østby was Namsos. By 1980, the route was carrying 16.368 vehicles and 42.943 passengers in a year. By then Leka was too small for her job, so Østby bought a larger ferry, MS Leka II. Leka was retained as a reserve ferry and docked at Skei.

Østby sold the ferry to Torghatten Trafikkselskap in 1992. They renamed the ship MS Torget on 21 December 1992, and moved her home port to Brønnøysund. She was then put into the ferry service from Brønnøysund to Sauren and Stortorgnes.

The ship was sold to Vidar Hop Skyssbåter on 31 January 2022, who named her MS Solfjord and moved her home port to Solund.
