= Valen, Nærøysund =

Village in Nærøysund Municipality, Norway

Valen
- Village
- Interactive map of Valen
- Location within Trøndelag Location within Norway
- Coordinates: 65.07412°N 11.9538°E
- Country: Norway
- Region: Central Norway
- County: Trøndelag
- District: Namdalen
- Municipality: Nærøysund Municipality
- Elevation: 1 m (3.3 ft)
- Time zone: UTC+01:00 (CET)
  - Summer (DST): UTC+02:00 (CEST)
- Post Code: 7990 Naustbukta

Valen is a village in Nærøysund Municipality in Trøndelag county, Norway. The village is located at the northern end of the Årsetfjorden right on the border with Nordland county. There is a small canal that separates Valen with the neighboring village of Bogen (which is in Bindal Municipality in Nordland county. The canal connects the Årsetfjorden with the Valenfjord to the north. The canal and the two fjords are what separates the island of Austra from the mainland. There only bridge connecting Austra to the mainland runs through Valen.
