= MS Frøyaferja (1976) =

Ferry built in 1976

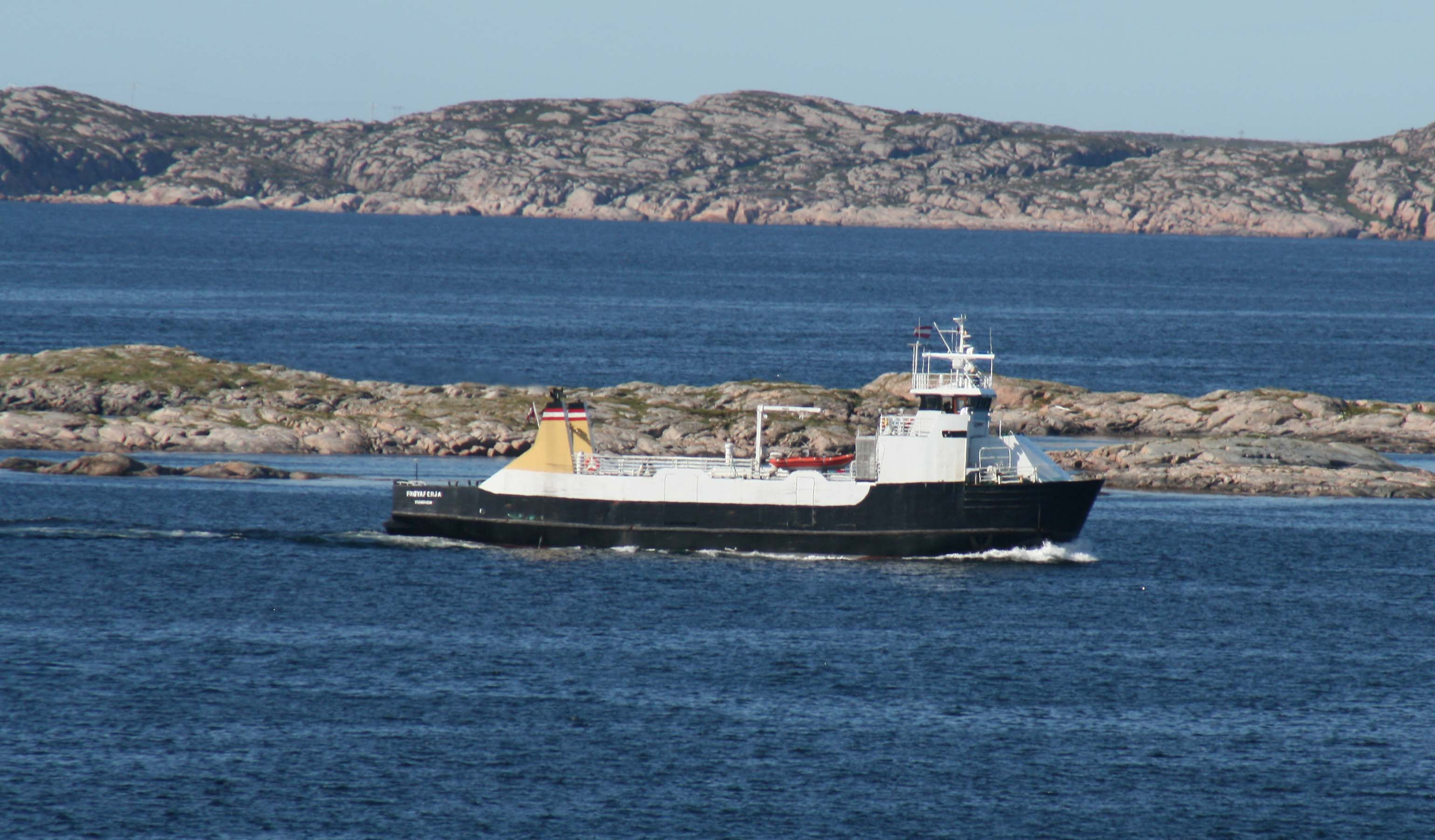

History
- Name: Lofotferje VIII (1978–83); Leka II (1983–2004); Frøyaferja (2004–)
- Owner: Lofoten Trafikklag (1978–83); Rolf Østby (1983–95); Lekaferja (1995–2004); Fosen Trafikklag (2004–08); FosenNamsos Sjø (2008–22); Torghatten Midt (2022–)
- Port of registry: Leknes (1976–83), Norway; Namsos (1983–2004), Norway; Trondheim (2004–), Norway
- Route: Smorten–Lyngvær (1976–1983); Skei–Gutvik (1983–2004); Dyrøy–Mausundvær–Sula (2006–)
- Builder: Trønderverftet
- Yard number: 34
- Acquired: 11 June 1976
- Identification: IMO number: 7529938; Call sign: LDAO

General characteristics
- Type: Vehicle and passenger ferry
- Tonnage: 312 GT, 93 NT
- Length: 30.8 m (101 ft 1 in)
- Beam: 9.20 m (30 ft 2 in)
- Draught: 4.00 m (13 ft 1 in)
- Installed power: 338 kW (460 hp); 515 kW (700 hp)
- Propulsion: Callesen 427DOT diesel engine (1978–88); Caterpillar 3508TA V8 diesel (1988–)
- Speed: 11 knots (20 km/h; 13 mph)
- Capacity: 15 passenger car units; 97 passengers

MS Frøyaferja is a passenger and road vehicle ferry in service with Torghatten Midt. Built by Trønderverftet in 1976, it is 31 meters (102 ft) long, has 312 gross tonnes and can carry 97 passengers and 15 passenger car units.

Originally named MS Lofotferje VIII, she was delivered to Lofoten Trafikklag for use on the Smorten–Lyngvær Ferry. The ferry was sold to Lekaferja in 1983, who extended her and renamed her MS Leka II. She ran as the Skei–Gutvik Ferry until 2001, and was then demoted as a reserve ferry from 2001. She was sold to Fosen Trafikklag in 2004, when she received her current name. There she has run as the Dyrøy–Mausundvær–Sula Ferry.

== History ==
The ferry's hull was built by Statlandsverftet in Nord-Statland and the ferry completed at Trønderverftet in Hommelvik. She was delivered to her initial owner, Lofoten Trafikklag, on 11 June 1976. She was maiden name was Lofotferja VIII and her initial port of registry was Leknes.

Lofotferje VIII was itially put into service between Smorten and Lyngvær. After only a year, in July 1977, the ferry was chartered to Møre og Romsdal Fylkesbåtar, who put her into service in Vinjefjorden. She returned to Lofoten in October 1979 and was reinstated on her original route.

On the Skei–Gutvik service, Rolf Østby had come to the realization that Leka was too small, and decided to buy Lofotferje VII. Ownership was transferrd on 4 April 1983. In July she was lengthened at Fosen Mekaniske Verksteder in Rissa. She was named Leka II, in honor of the eponymous island she served. Østby made further upgrades in 1988, when she received a new and more powerful Caterpillar engine.

The shipping company Rolf Østby was reorganized as Lekaferja in 1995, which took over ownership of Leka II. She remained the main ferry on the route until the 2001 delivery of MS Leka, after which Leka II was demoted as a reserve ferry.

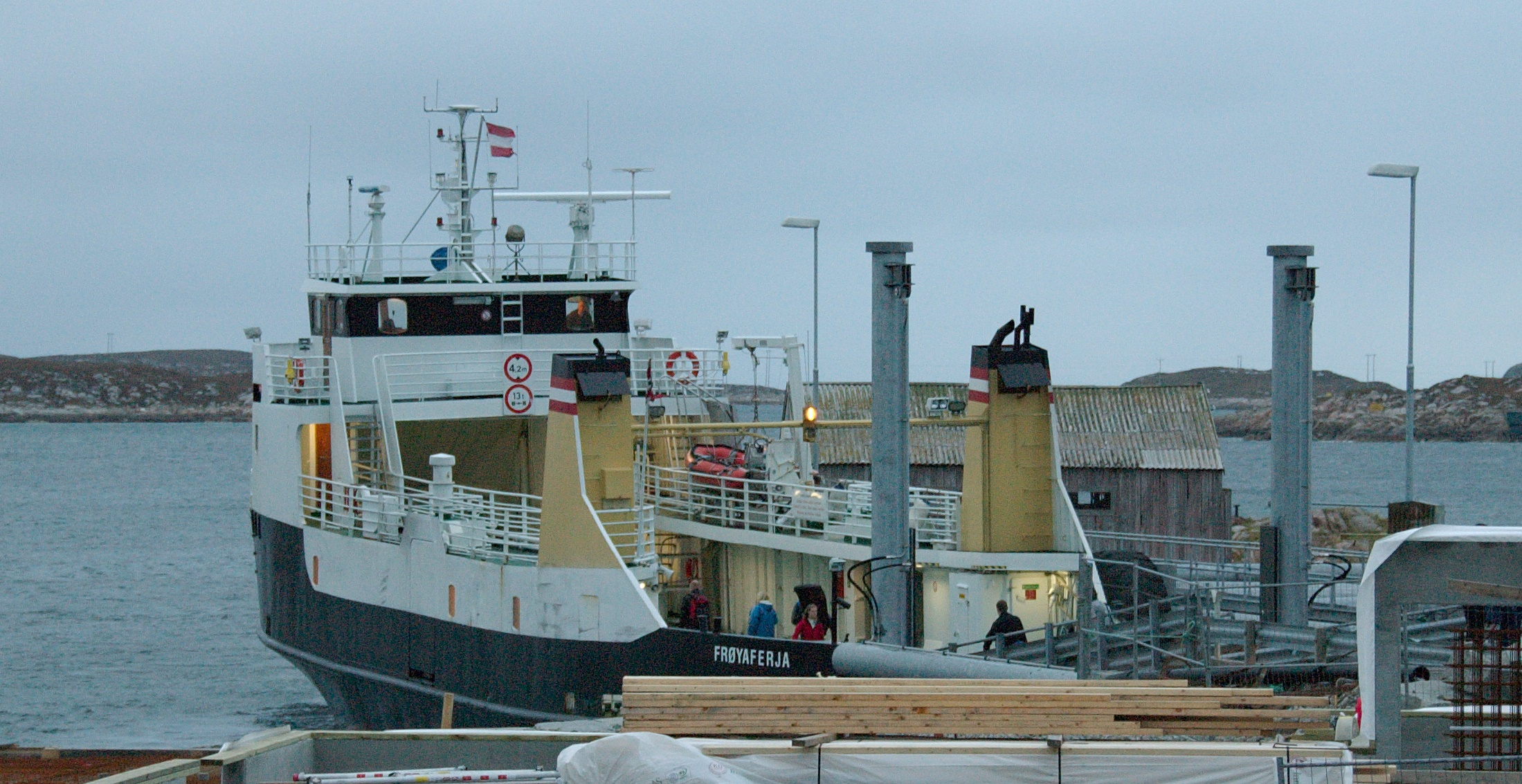
Frøyaferja in Frøya Municipality in 2007

Lekaferja sold the ship to Fosen Trafikklag on 8 January 2004. They named her Frøyaferja. She received a major overhaul at Trondheim Verft, and was then put into service on the service in outer Frøya Municipality. Through corporate mergers, ownership and operation passed to FosenNamsos Sjø in 2008 and then to Torghatten Midt in 2022.

Frøyaferja was initially retired in 2023, and the service replaced by Ramtind. However, the replacement ship proved unable to handle the route, and Frøyaferja was taken out of retirement from November 2025.
