= Gutvik =

- Village
- Interactive map of Gutvik
- Location within Trøndelag Location within Norway
- Coordinates: 65.084°N 11.829°E
- Country: Norway
- Region: Central Norway
- County: Trøndelag
- District: Namdalen
- Municipality: Leka Municipality
- Time zone: UTC+01:00 (CET)
  - Summer (DST): UTC+02:00 (CEST)
- Postal code: 7993 Gutvik

Gutvik is a rural area on the west side of the island of Austra in Leka Municipality, Norway. It borders Lekafjorden to the west. The basic statistical unit of Gutvik had a population of 60 in 2025. As of 2022, no children lived in Gutvik. Although connected by a fixed link to the mainland, Gutvik is part of Leka Municipality, where the municipal center of Leknes and most of the population is situated on the island of Leka. Access to the island is by the Skei–Gutvik Ferry.

The ferry quay was built in 1964 at the time the vehicle ferry started operating. A new quay was built in 1991, and then extended in 2000 with a new bridge and longer dock to support a larger ferry.
