= Skei–Gutvik Ferry =

Ferry route in Norway

Skei–Gutvik
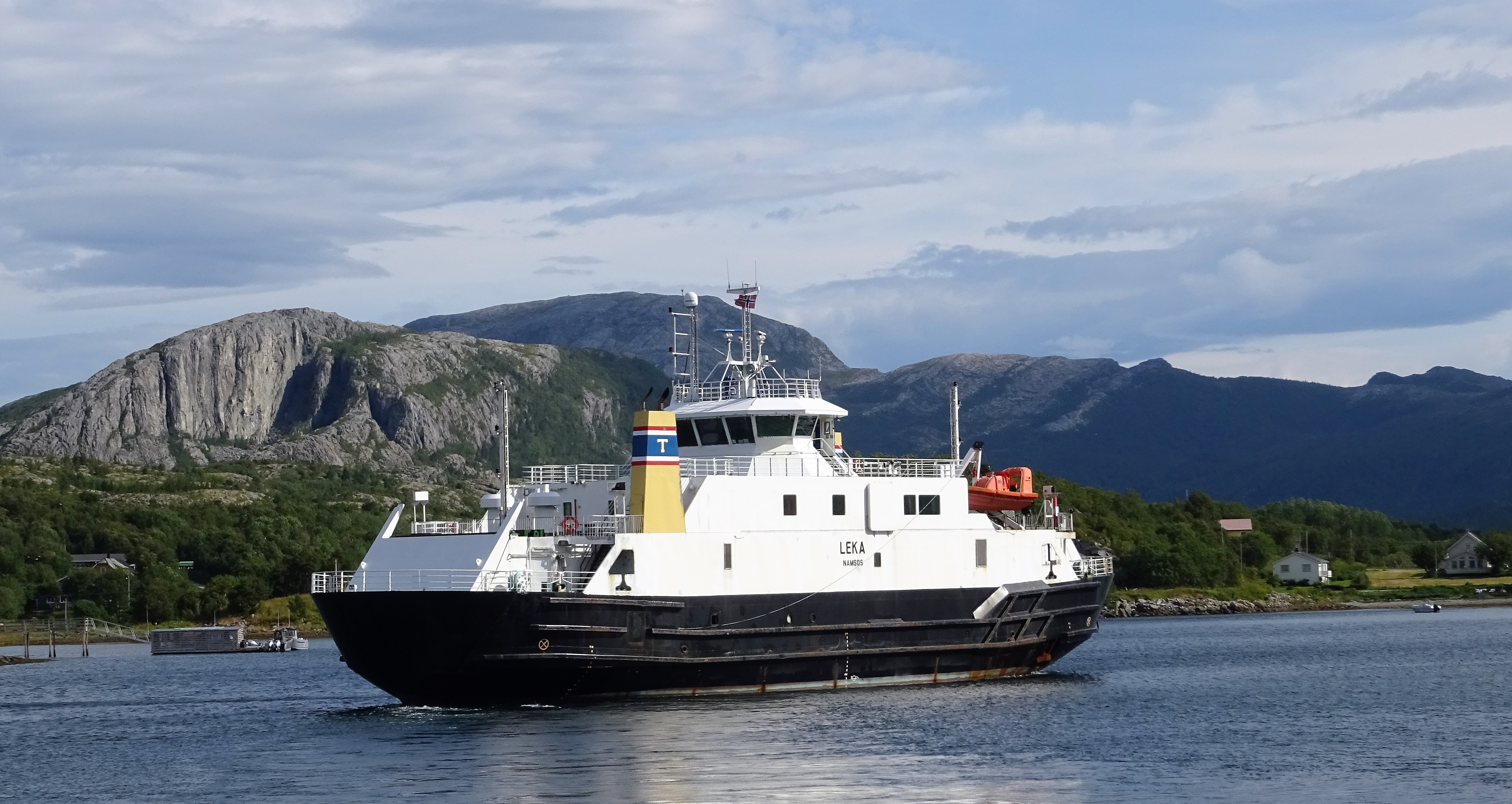
- Locale: Leka Municipality, Norway
- Waterway: Lekafjorden
- Transit type: Passenger and road vehicle ferry
- Route: 960
- Carries: County Road 771
- Fleet: MS Leka
- Owner: Trøndelag County Municipality
- Operator: Torghatten Midt
- Authority: AtB
- Began operation: 1964
- Travel time: 20 minutes
- No. of vessels: 1
- No. of terminals: 2
- Yearly ridership: 69.553 (2016)
- Daily vehicles: 140 (2024)
- Yearly vehicles: 51.139 (2024)
- Website: Schedule

The Skei–Gutvik Ferry (Norwegian: Ferjesambandet Skei–Gutvik) is a passenger and road vehicle ferry which crosses Lekafjorden in Leka Municipality, Norway. It connects the island of Leka at Skei with the island of Austra at Gutvik, as part of County Road 771. The route is connected to the mainland via Austra. The service is managed by the transit agency AtB and operated by Torghatten Midt. It is served by MS Leka, with a capacity for 38 passenger car equivalents. The crossing is 5.2 kilometers (3.2 mi) with a crossing time of about 20 minutes.

The ferry service started in 1964 with the ferry MS Leka, operated by local shipowner Roft Østby. A larger ferry, MS Leka II, was introduced in 1983. Operations passed to the company Lekaferja in 1995, and then to Torghatten Trafikkselskap. The service has been free since 2022.

== Route and service ==
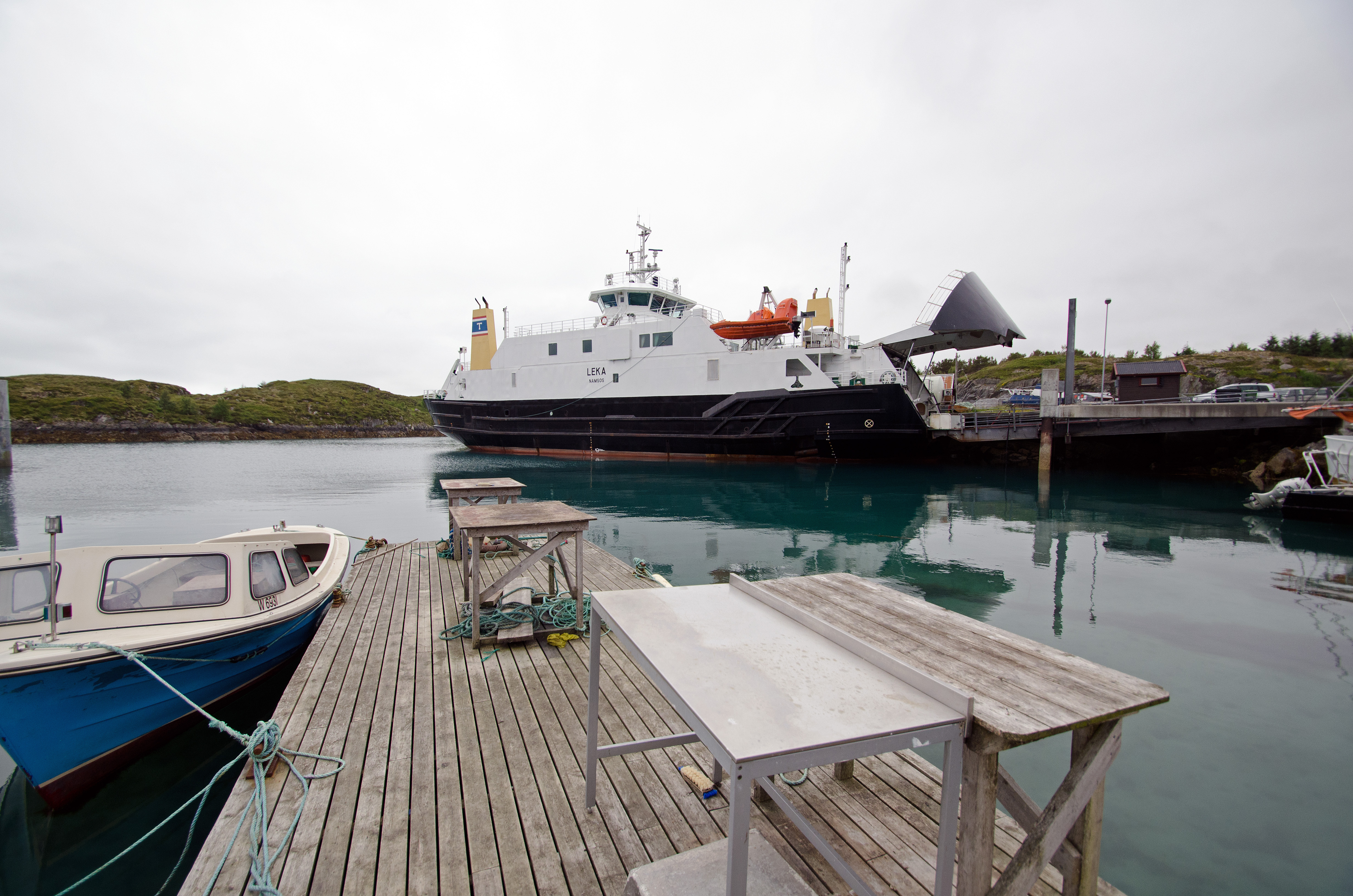
MS Leka (II) docked at Skei

The ferry operates between the quays at Skei, on the island of Leka, and Gutvik, on the island of Austra. The crossing is 5.2 kilometers (3.2 mi) long and takes about 20 minutes. The service is part of County Road 771 and designated by AtB as Route 960. There are sixteen departures each way on weekdays, and eight per day on weekends.

At both quays the ferry needs to make a 90-degree turn just as it is to dock. This maneuver is not possible with a conventional ferry, so Leka has been designed to handle the sharp turn.

The service is an emergency readiness route. This requires the ferry and a crew to be ready for a departure within 30 minutes on a 24/7 basis. As there is an ambulance on Leka, the ferry spends the night on the Skei side.

== History ==
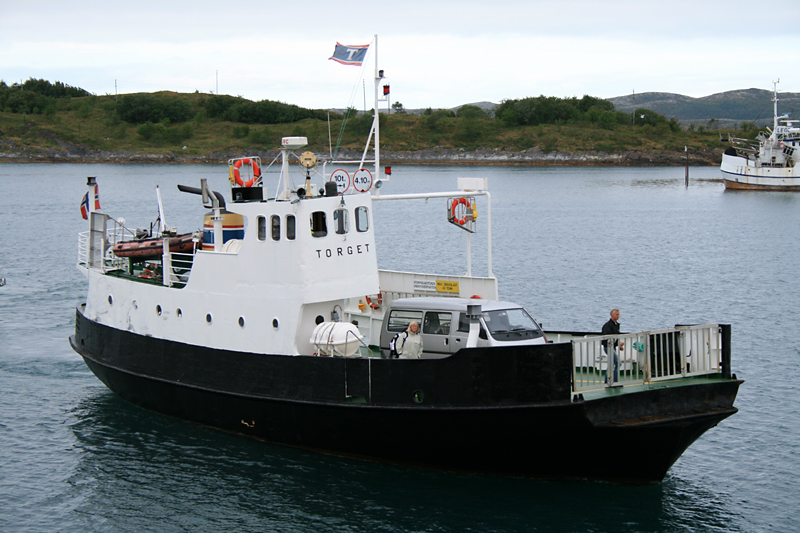
The fist ferry, MS Leka, depticed in 2007 in Brønnøysund after the sale and name change to Torget.

A car ferry crossing connecting the islands of Leka and Austra was established in 1964 by local shipowner Rolf Østby (born 1918) though his sole proprietorship, Rolf Østby. He ordered a brand new ferry, Leka, from Ulstein Mekaniske Verksted. The ferry had a capacity for ten passenger car equivalents. Quays were built at Skei and Gutvik.

Increased traffic made Leka too small, and Østby there bought a second, used ferry, MS Leka II in 1983, with capacity for 17 passenger car equivalents. Leka II proved too small, so it was extended and closed off in the bow in 1983. Leka was retained as a reserve ferry until it was sold in 1992.

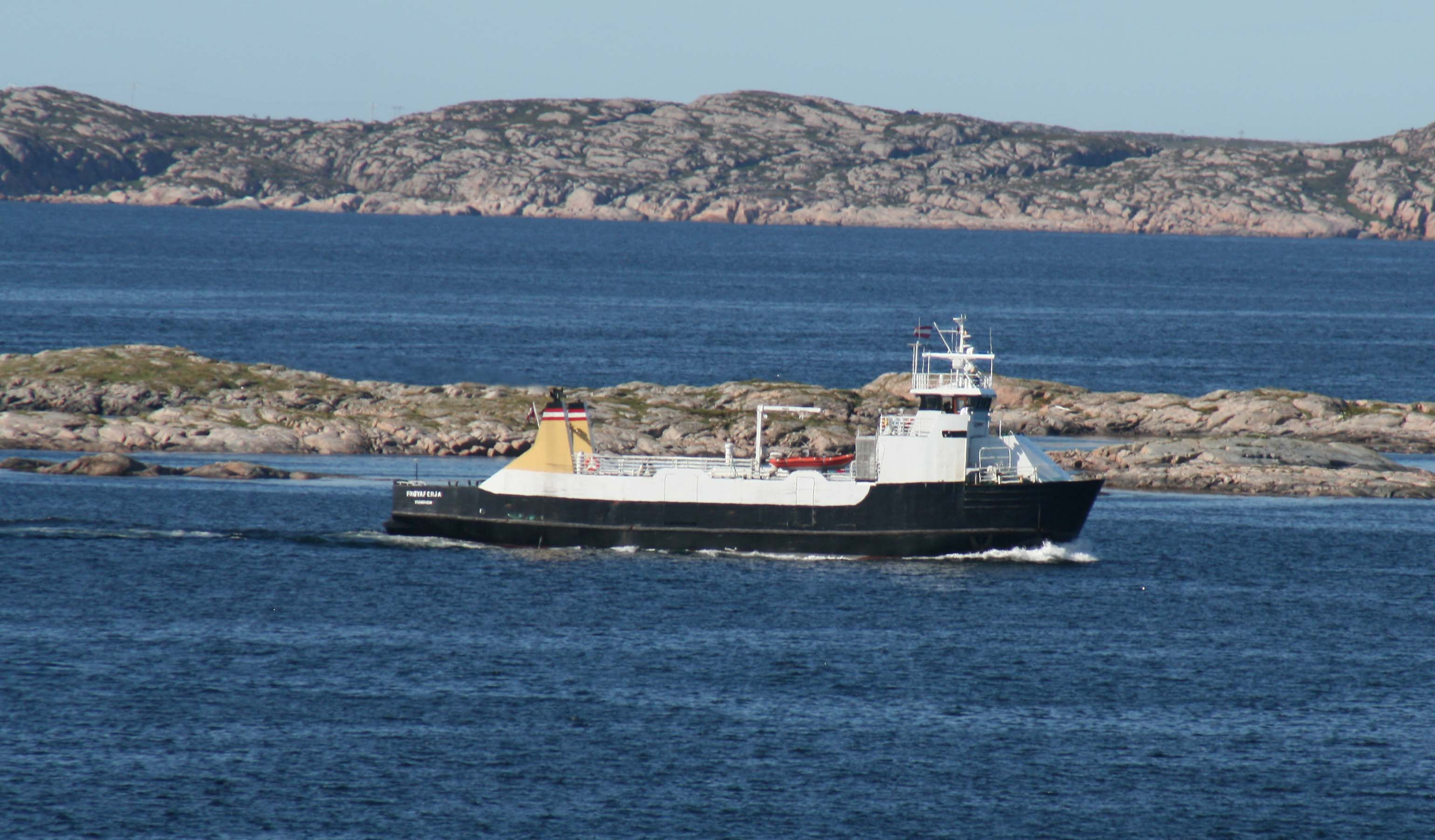
The second ferry, MS Leka II, depitced in 2007 in Frøya Municipality after the sale and name change to Frøyaferja.

A major upgrade to the quays on both sides of the fjord were carried out in 1991.

In 1995 the operations of the ferry were turned over to a limited company, Lekaferja AS, which was owned 55 percent by Torghatten Trafikkselskap and 45 percent by Rolf Østby. Torghatten increased their stake in the company to 60 percent the following year, before buying out Østby entirely in 2000. Ownership of Leka II had remained with Østby personally until it was transferred to Torghatten at the same time as they bought the entire company in 2000.

The third ferry to operate on the route, also named Leka, was built by UK's Cammell Laird and registered on 30 January 2001. It was an entiely closed ferry. Leka II was sold in 2004, after which the reserve ferry was covered as part of Torghatten's wider fleet.

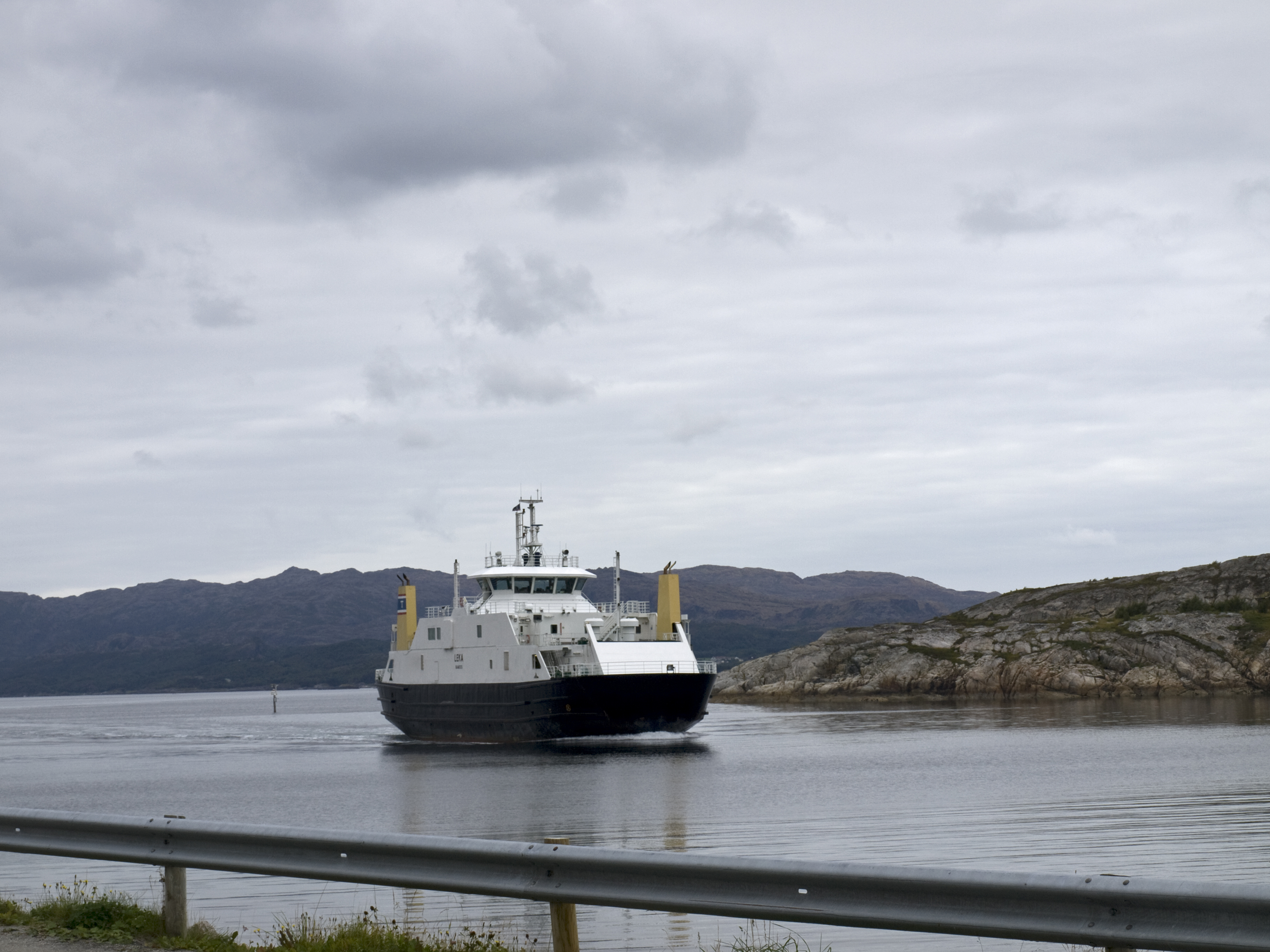
MS Leka as she approaches Gutvik in 2013.

Traditionally the service was operated with a concession, whereby the operating company and the authorities negotiated a subsidy. As part of a wider government policy change, the ferry route became subject to public service obligation from 2007. Subsequent tenders were issued from 2010, 2019, 2021 and 2025, and have all been won by Lekaferja/Torghatten with the continued use of the same fery. The contract awarded in 2019 gave an operating cost of 14 million kroner per year.

On 1 January 2010 the responsibility for National Road 771 was regionalized to Nord-Trøndelag County Municipality, who thereby also took over the administration and funding for the ferry route. Through a county merger, this administrative responsibility passed to Trøndelag County Municipality and their public transit agency AtB from 1 January 2018. Starting in 2025, the route was made up of a common bid package with the Ølhammeren–Seierstad Ferry and the Hofles–Geisnes–Lund Ferry.

The ferry has been free since 1 July 2022, when fees were removed on all ferry services in Norway with less than 100.000 annual vehicles.

== Statistics ==
The following is a list of annual vehicle and passenger ridership on the service by year.

Year	Vehicles	Passengers	Ref
1973	9.782	36.000	
1980	16.368	42.943	
1990	27.278	60.839	
2000	25.927	53.453	
2010	30.361	56.622	
2016	35.433	69.553	
2024	51.139		

== Fleet ==
The following is a list of ferries which have operated on the service, noting their name, passenger car equivalent capacity, year introduced, year they left service and notes.

Vessel	PCE	Start	End	Notes
Leka (I)	10	1964	1992	Reserve ferry from 1983 to 1992
Leka II	18	1983	2004	Reseve ferry from 2001 to 2004
Leka (II)	38	2001	–	
