= Valen, Bindal =

Fjord in Nordland, Norway

Valen
- Kjærstadvalen
- Interactive map of the fjord
- Location: Nordland county, Norway
- Coordinates: 65.08990°N 11.9934654°E
- Type: Fjord
- Basin countries: Norway
- Max. length: 4 kilometres (2.5 mi)

Valen is a small fjord that branches off of the larger Kjella fjord in Bindal Municipality in Nordland county, Norway. It gets its name from the village of Valen which lies at its south-eastern end.

The mouth of the fjord arm stretches between Skjevelneset on the island of Austra (on the west side of the mouth) and Hålopneset on the mainland (on the east side of the mouth). The bay runs 4 kilometres (2.5 mi) southwestwards, ending at the Valastraumen, a narrow channel which links this fjord arm with that of Årsetfjorden in Nærøy Municipality in Trøndelag county.

The Valastraumen channel separates the hamlet of Bogen on Austra island from the hamlet of Valen on the mainland. Although Valen lies mostly in Nordland county, the hamlet of Valen is in Trondelag.

Highway 771 runs along the north side of the Valen fjord.
