= Gravvik Church =

Church in Trøndelag, Norway

- Gravvik kirke
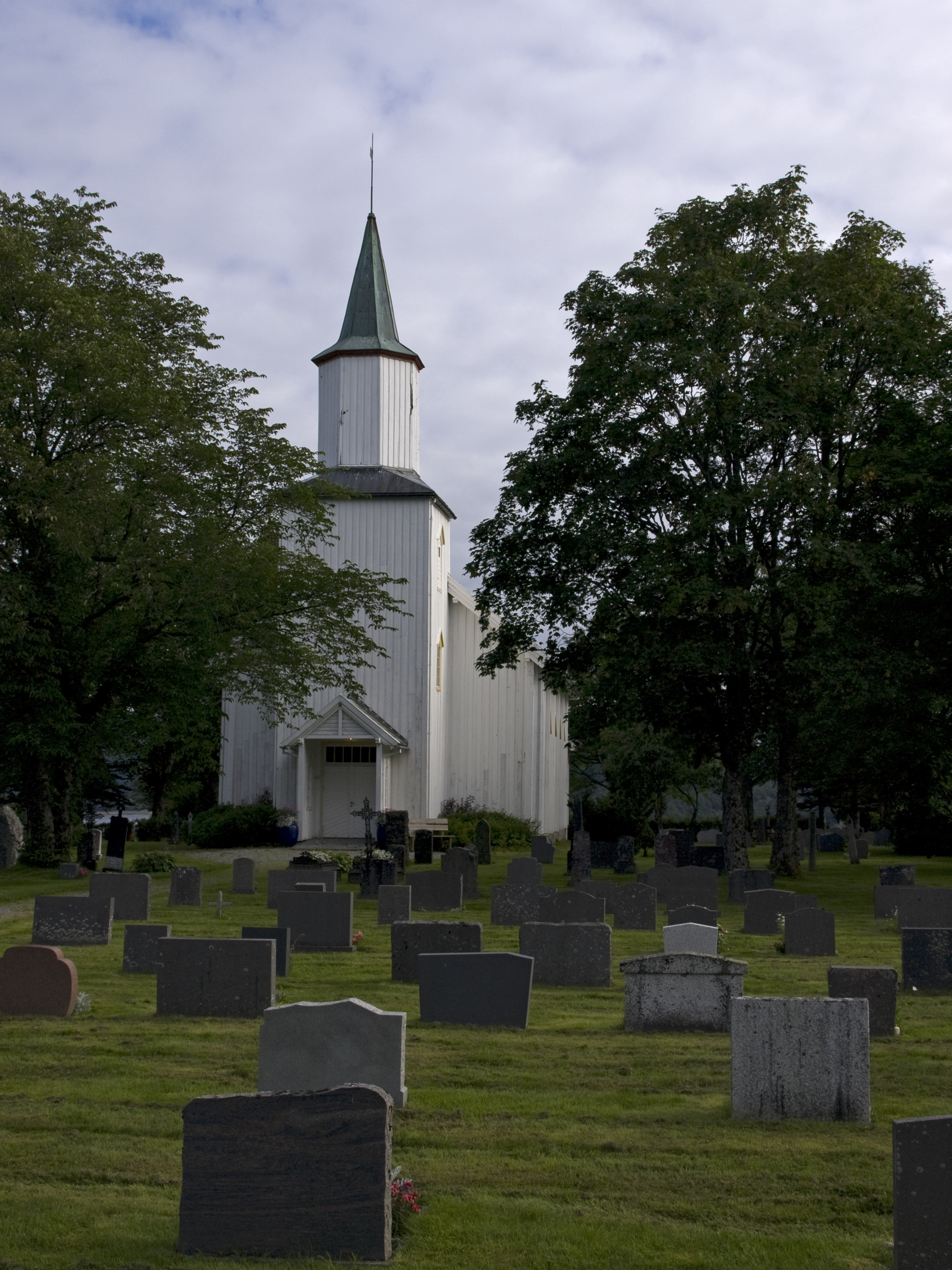
- View of the church
- Gravvik Church
- 64.99011368°N 11.76892295°E
- Location: Nærøysund Municipality, Trøndelag
- Country: Norway
- Denomination: Church of Norway
- Churchmanship: Evangelical Lutheran

History
- Status: Parish church
- Founded: 1875
- Consecrated: 17 Sept 1875

Architecture
- Functional status: Active
- Architect: Knut Grudt Laugen
- Architectural type: Long church
- Completed: 1875 (151 years ago)

Specifications
- Capacity: 290
- Materials: Wood

Administration
- Diocese: Nidaros bispedømme
- Deanery: Namdal prosti
- Parish: Nærøy
- Norwegian Cultural Heritage Site
- Type: Church
- Status: Not protected
- ID: 84412

Gravvik Church (Norwegian: Gravvik kirke) is a parish church of the Church of Norway in Nærøysund Municipality in Trøndelag county, Norway. It is located in the village of Gravvika. It is one of the churches for the Nærøy parish which is part of the Namdal prosti (deanery) in the Diocese of Nidaros. The white, wooden church was built in a long church style in 1875 using plans drawn up by the architect Knut Grudt Laugen. The church seats about 290 people.

== History ==
Permission to build a church in Gravvik (formerly in Leka Municipality, now in Nærøysund Municipality) was granted by a royal decree on 11 October 1866. It took a few years, however, to get the church built, partly because the main Leka Church had to be rebuilt after a fire at the same time and that job was prioritized over the new Gravvik Church. The new church was consecrated on 17 September 1875, although it was not completely finished on that date.

== See also ==
- List of churches in Nidaros
