= Skei, Leka =

Skei
- Village
- Interactive map of Skei
- Location within Trøndelag Location within Norway
- Coordinates: 65.093°N 11.734°E
- Country: Norway
- Region: Central Norway
- County: Trøndelag
- District: Namdalen
- Municipality: Leka Municipality
- Elevation: 18 m (59 ft)
- Time zone: UTC+01:00 (CET)
  - Summer (DST): UTC+02:00 (CEST)
- Post code: 7994 Leka

Skei is a populated locality on the island of Leka in Leka Municipality, Trøndelag, Norway. It is situated southeast of the municipal center of Leknes and east of Huseby, on the shore of the Lekafjorden sound. Along with Huseby, the basic statistical unit of Skei – Huseby had a population of 202 in 2025.

Skei is the site of a ferry quay serving the Skei–Gutvik Ferry on County Road 771, and a fast ferry service to Rørvik and Namsos.

The Herlaug Mound is one of the largest burial mounds in Norway and is Scandinavia's oldest ship burial.

== Etymology ==
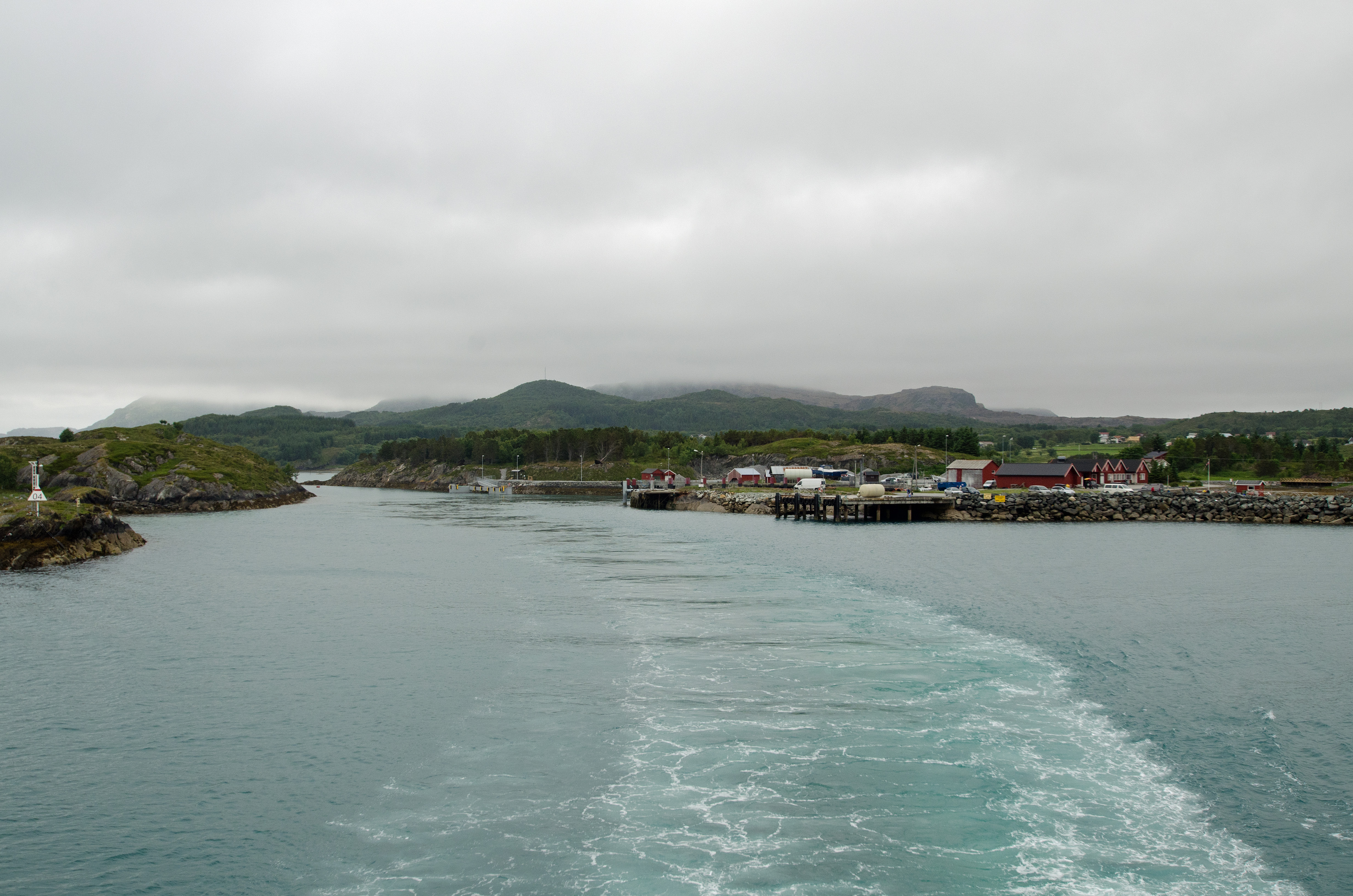
The quay area as seen from a departing ferry

The area takes it name from the farm Skei, from Old Norwegian Skeid, indicating the area had been used for horse racing or other sports.

== History ==
People may have lived in the area for nearly ten thousand years. Namdalen and Helgeland experienced a rise in power and wealth during the Merovinger Age (550–800) and Viking Age (800–1000). Gerhard Schøning claimed Leka as the main seat of the Namdalen chieftains, and attributed their wealth to control of Lekafjord, fishing and trade with dried fish. The area around Skei and the neighboring farm of Huseby has about fifty large burial mounds, which is an indication of wealth.

The largest mound, the Herlaug Mound, dates from 700.

According to Snorri Sturluson, the chieftan-brothers Haurlag and Rollaug ruled the area in northern Namdalen, and it is believed that Skei and the neighboring farm of Huseby may have been one of their four seats. During the 18th century the mound was associated with Herlaug, and was named in his honor. It has since been dated to an earlier period. The Herlaugh Mound was subject to rudimentary excavation three times, in 1755, 1775 and 1780. Limited data was collected, and the excavations have to a large extent destroyed the integrity of the mound. Skeletons and a sword blade were found.

The first church in Leka was built at Skei during the early 13th century. It is not known how long it lasted, but was presumed to have stood for about two centuries, until the early 14th century. The replacement church was then built at Leknes.

Skei is a rather flat area on an otherwise fairly hilly island, and was historically used as a gathering place for racing, sports and military training.

Leka Local History Museum was established at Skei in 1962. There was previously a post office at Skei, by the quay.

The passenger car ferry service started in 1964 by Rolf Østby using the ferry MS Leka. The quay was modernized in 1990. In 2000, operations of the ferry passed to Torghatten Trafikkselskap, who introduced the new ferry MS Leka. At the same time the quay was rebuilt to support a larger ferry.

== Quay ==
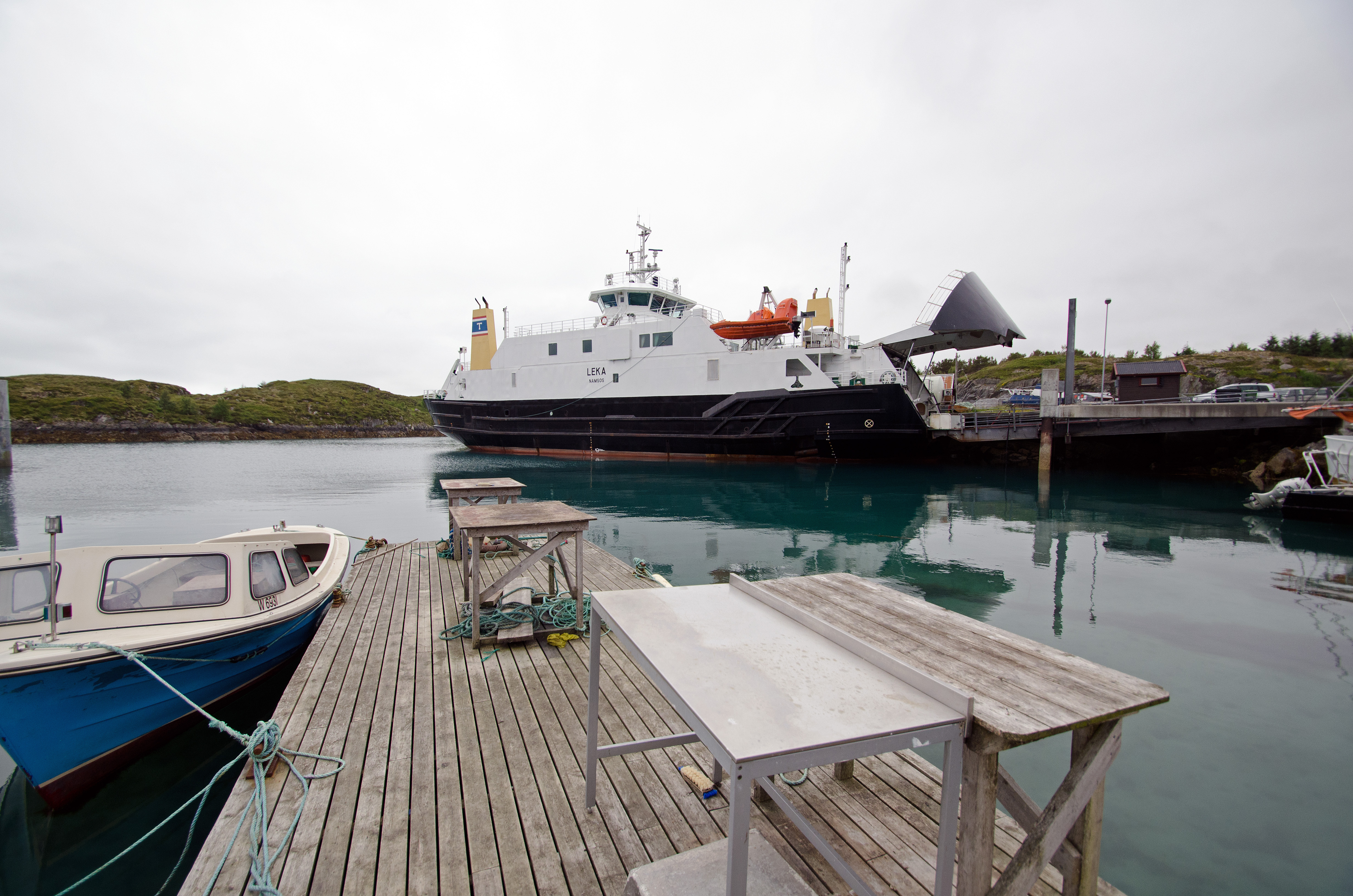
MS Leka docked at Skei in 2012

The quay area is served by the Skei–Gutvik Ferry, part of County Road 771. as well as a fast ferry service to Rørvik and Namsos.

The quay area at Skei consists of a parking area, a car waiting area and a small technical building. There are three docks: the main dock for the vehicle ferry, a fast ferry dock and a dock for the reserve ferry to dock at if needed. The vehicle dock is rather challenging, as the ferry needs to make a ninety-degree turn just as it enters and leaves the dock.

There is a marina with a service building.
