= Leknes (disambiguation) =

Leknes may refer to the following places:

- Leknes, a town in Vestvågøy municipality in Nordland county, Norway
- Leknes Airport, an airport in Vestvågøy municipality in Nordland county, Norway
- Leknes, Hordaland, a village in Lindås municipality in Hordaland county, Norway
- Leknes, Trøndelag, a village in Leka municipality in Trøndelag county, Norway
