= Lekamøya =

Mountain in Trøndelag, Norway

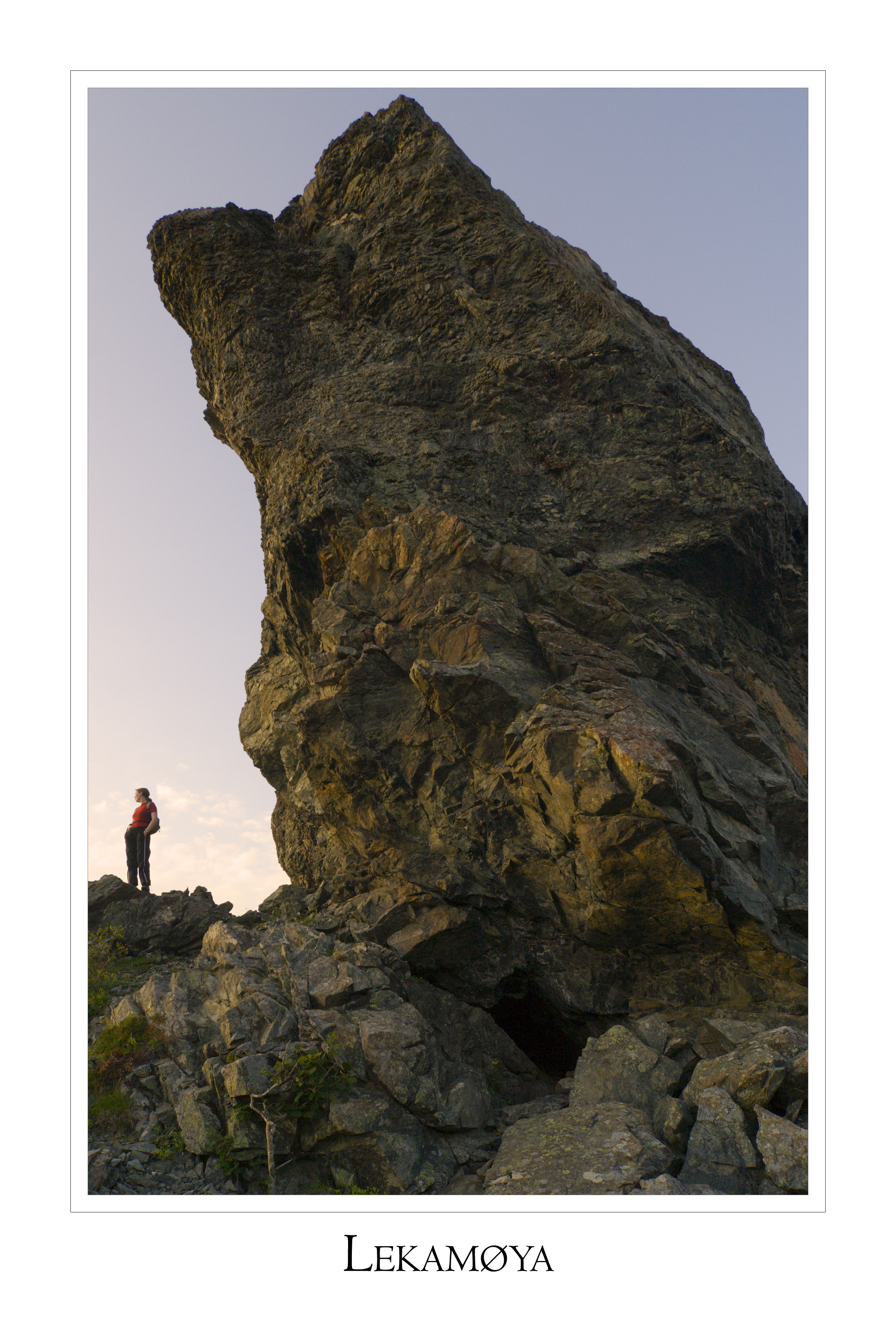

Highest point
- Elevation: 124 m (407 ft)
- Coordinates: 65.0498°N 11.5686°E

Geography
- Interactive map of the mountain
- Location: Trøndelag, Norway

Lekamøya (lit. 'the Leka Maiden') is a mountain in Leka Municipality in Trøndelag county, Norway. The 124-metre (407 ft) tall mountain is located on the island of Leka and it is a characteristic sea mark. Viewed from southeast, the mountain looks like a woman, and has been part of a local legend.
