= Årset =

Årset may refer to:

- Årset, Ålesund, a village in Ålesund Municipality in Møre og Romsdal county, Norway
- Årset, Trøndelag, a village in Nærøysund Municipality in Trondelag county, Norway
- Årset, Vartdal, a farming area in Ørsta Municipality in Møre og Romsdal county, Norway

== See also ==
- Aarset
