= Sklinna Lighthouse =

Lighthouse in Trøndelag, Norway

Sklinna Lighthouse Sklinna fyrstasjon
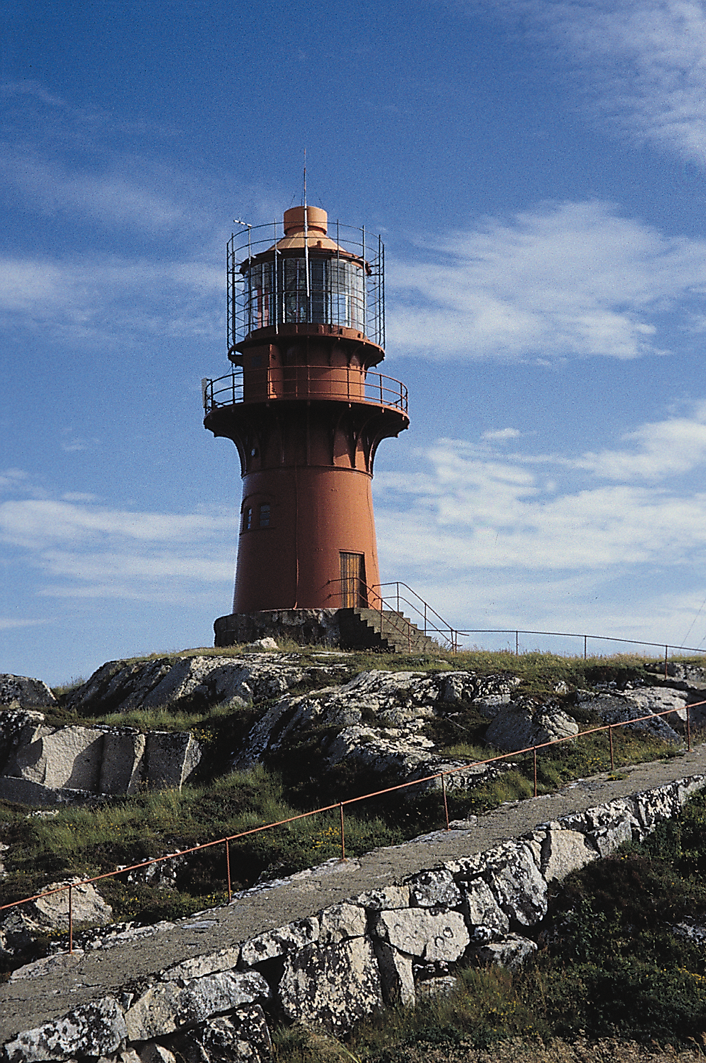
- View of the lighthouse
- Location: Heimøya, Leka Municipality, Norway
- Coordinates: 65°12′07″N 10°59′45″E

Tower
- Constructed: 1910
- Construction: cast iron
- Automated: 2004
- Height: 14.3 m (47 ft)
- Shape: cylinder
- Markings: Red
- Heritage: cultural heritage preservation in Norway

Light
- Focal height: 45 m (148 ft)
- Lens: second order Fresnel lens
- Range: 18.6 nmi (34.4 km; 21.4 mi)
- Characteristic: Oc WRG 6s

Sklinna Lighthouse (Norwegian: Sklinna fyr) is a lighthouse in Leka Municipality in Trøndelag county, Norway. Sklinna Lighthouse is located on the island of Heimøya in the Sklinna island group about 30 kilometres (19 mi) northwest of the island of Leka and about 30 kilometres (19 mi) north of the island of Ytter-Vikna in Nærøysund Municipality. The lighthouse is one of the northernmost points in Trøndelag county.

The round, red, cast iron tower stands 14.3 metres (47 ft) tall on a hill on the island. The light sits on top of the tower at an elevation of 45 metres (148 ft) and it emits a white, red, or green light (depending on direction), occulting once every six seconds. The light can be seen for about 18.6 nautical miles (34.4 km; 21.4 mi).

== Climate ==
Climate data for Sklinna Lighthouse 1991-2020 (23 m)
Month	Jan	Feb	Mar	Apr	May	Jun	Jul	Aug	Sep	Oct	Nov	Dec	Year
Mean daily maximum °C (°F)	3.7 (38.7)	3.1 (37.6)	4.1 (39.4)	6.4 (43.5)	9.6 (49.3)	12.2 (54.0)	14.8 (58.6)	15.4 (59.7)	13 (55)	9.1 (48.4)	6.2 (43.2)	4.6 (40.3)	8.5 (47.3)
Daily mean °C (°F)	2.1 (35.8)	1.4 (34.5)	2.2 (36.0)	4.3 (39.7)	7.1 (44.8)	10 (50)	12.6 (54.7)	13.2 (55.8)	11.2 (52.2)	7.6 (45.7)	4.7 (40.5)	3 (37)	6.6 (43.9)
Mean daily minimum °C (°F)	0.3 (32.5)	−0.4 (31.3)	0.6 (33.1)	2.7 (36.9)	5.5 (41.9)	8.5 (47.3)	11.1 (52.0)	11.7 (53.1)	9.7 (49.5)	6.1 (43.0)	3 (37)	1.1 (34.0)	5.0 (41.0)
Average precipitation mm (inches)	96 (3.8)	77 (3.0)	82 (3.2)	59 (2.3)	40 (1.6)	50 (2.0)	49 (1.9)	56 (2.2)	86 (3.4)	89 (3.5)	91 (3.6)	91 (3.6)	866 (34.1)
Source 1: yr.no
Source 2: NOAA - WMO averages 91-2020 Norway

== See also ==
- Lighthouses in Norway
- List of lighthouses in Norway
