= MS Frøyaferja =

MS Frøyaferja is the name of several ferries. It may refer to:

- MS Frøyaferja (1964)
- MS Frøyaferja (1976), which is still in operation.
