= Gravvik =

Gravvik may refer to:

== Places ==
- Gravvika, a village in Nærøysund Municipality in Trøndelag county, Norway
- Gravvik Church, a church in Nærøysund Municipality in Trøndelag county, Norway
- Gravvik Municipality, a former municipality in the old Nord-Trøndelag county, Norway
