= Herlaug Mound =

Grave mound in Leka, Norway

The Herlaug Mound (Norwegian: Herlaugshaugen) is a grave mound and ship burial situated on the island of Leka at Skei in Leka Municipality, Norway. The mound dates from about year 700, during the Mervinger Age, and would have been used for a norse funeral for a prominent figure. It is the oldest known ship mound in Scandinavia. The mound is about 60 metres (200 ft), which makes it one of the largest such mounds in Norway. Parts of it have been severely damaged due to excavations during the 18th century.

== Etymology ==
Herlaug was a chieftain ruling over Namdalen, attested by Snorri Sturluson. During the 18th century, locals believed that it was the mound of the chieftain, and it became named in his honor. However, the dating indicates that the mound is too old to be his.

== History ==
The mound dates from around 700.

There were carried out three excavations during the 18th century, in 1755, 1775 and 1780. Limited data was collected, and the excavations partially destroyed the integrity of the mound. The main findings were a brick wall, iron rivets, a bronze pot and a sitting skeleton with a sword blade. The findings were taken to the Royal Norwegian Society of Sciences and Letters, but have all since disappeared. The skeleton was last seen on display at Trondheim Cathedral School during the 1920s.

An excavation was carried out in 2023. It found rivets, which must have been used for a ship. Based on the evidence, the archaeologics concluded that there must have been a ship in the mound, even if it may have rotted away by now.
