= Aarset =

Aarset is a Norwegian surname. Notable people with the surname include:

- Eivind Aarset (born 1961), Norwegian jazz guitarist
- John-Ragnar Aarset (born 1973), Norwegian politician

== See also ==
- Årset (disambiguation)
