= Hans Mikal Solsem =

Norwegian politician

Hans Mikal Solsem (born 17 February 1912 in Leka Municipality, died 6 January 1972) was a Norwegian politician for the Labour Party.

He served as a deputy representative to the Norwegian Parliament from Nord-Trøndelag during the terms 1950–1953, 1954–1957, 1958–1961, 1961–1965 and 1965–1969. From 1958 to 1959 he served as a regular representative meanwhile Gustav Sjaastad was appointed to the third cabinet Gerhardsen, as well as from 1963 to 1965 meanwhile Leif Granli was appointed to the fourth cabinet Gerhardsen.

On the local level Solsem was a member of the municipal council for Leka Municipality from 1945, served as deputy mayor from 1947 to 1951 and then mayor from 1951 to 1957 and 1959 to 1960. In 1945–1947 he was a member of Nord-Trøndelag county council. Outside politics he worked as a fisher and farmer.
