= Leka Church =

Church in Trøndelag, Norway

- Leka kirke
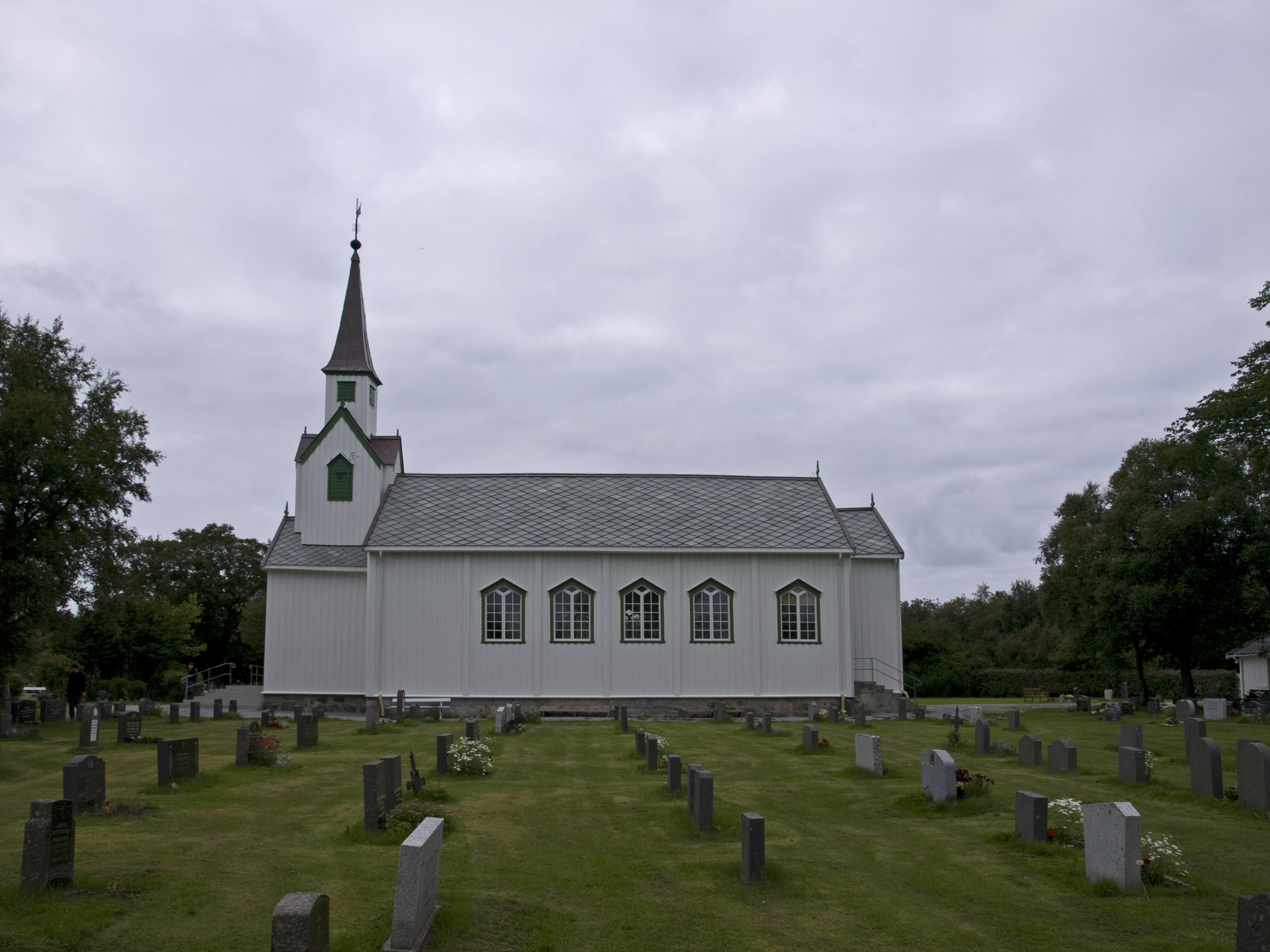
- View of the church
- Leka Church
- 65.0887510°N 11.7101919°E
- Location: Leka Municipality, Trøndelag
- Country: Norway
- Denomination: Church of Norway
- Churchmanship: Evangelical Lutheran

History
- Status: Parish church
- Founded: 11th century
- Consecrated: 1867

Architecture
- Functional status: Active
- Architect: Jacob Wilhelm Nordan
- Architectural type: Long church
- Completed: 1867 (159 years ago)

Specifications
- Capacity: 200
- Materials: Wood

Administration
- Diocese: Nidaros bispedømme
- Deanery: Namdal prosti
- Parish: Leka
- Norwegian Cultural Heritage Site
- Type: Church
- Status: Listed
- ID: 84284

Leka Church (Norwegian: Leka kirke) is a parish church of the Church of Norway in Leka Municipality in Trøndelag county, Norway. It is located in the village of Leknes on the island of Leka. It is the church for the Leka parish which is part of the Namdal prosti (deanery) in the Diocese of Nidaros. The white, wooden church was built in a long church style in 1867 by Knudt Grudt who used plans drawn up by the architect Jacob Wilhelm Nordan. The church seats about 200 people.

== History ==
The earliest existing historical records of the church date back to the year 1589, but the church was not new that year. The first church was located at Skei on the southeast coast of the island and that church is traditionally said to have been built in the year 1020. At some point that church was torn down and a new church was built at Leknes around the year 1520. This church was located about 1 kilometre (0.62 mi) to the northwest of the present church site. By the 1630s, the church had fallen into disrepair and in 1634 the church was torn down. A new church was about 1 kilometre (0.62 mi) to the southeast at Husby. Not much is known about this church. On 12 February 1864, the church was struck by lightning and it burned to the ground. Fortunately the altarpiece and some interior paintings were rescued from the church before they caught fire. After the fire, the parish negotiated purchasing the church from its private owner. In 1866, the municipality became the owner of the church and immediately began planning for a new church. The new building was constructed on the same site in 1867 and it was consecrated on 27 October 1867.

== See also ==
- List of churches in Nidaros
