= Lekafjorden =

Fjord in Norway

Coordinates: 65°04′N 11°45′E

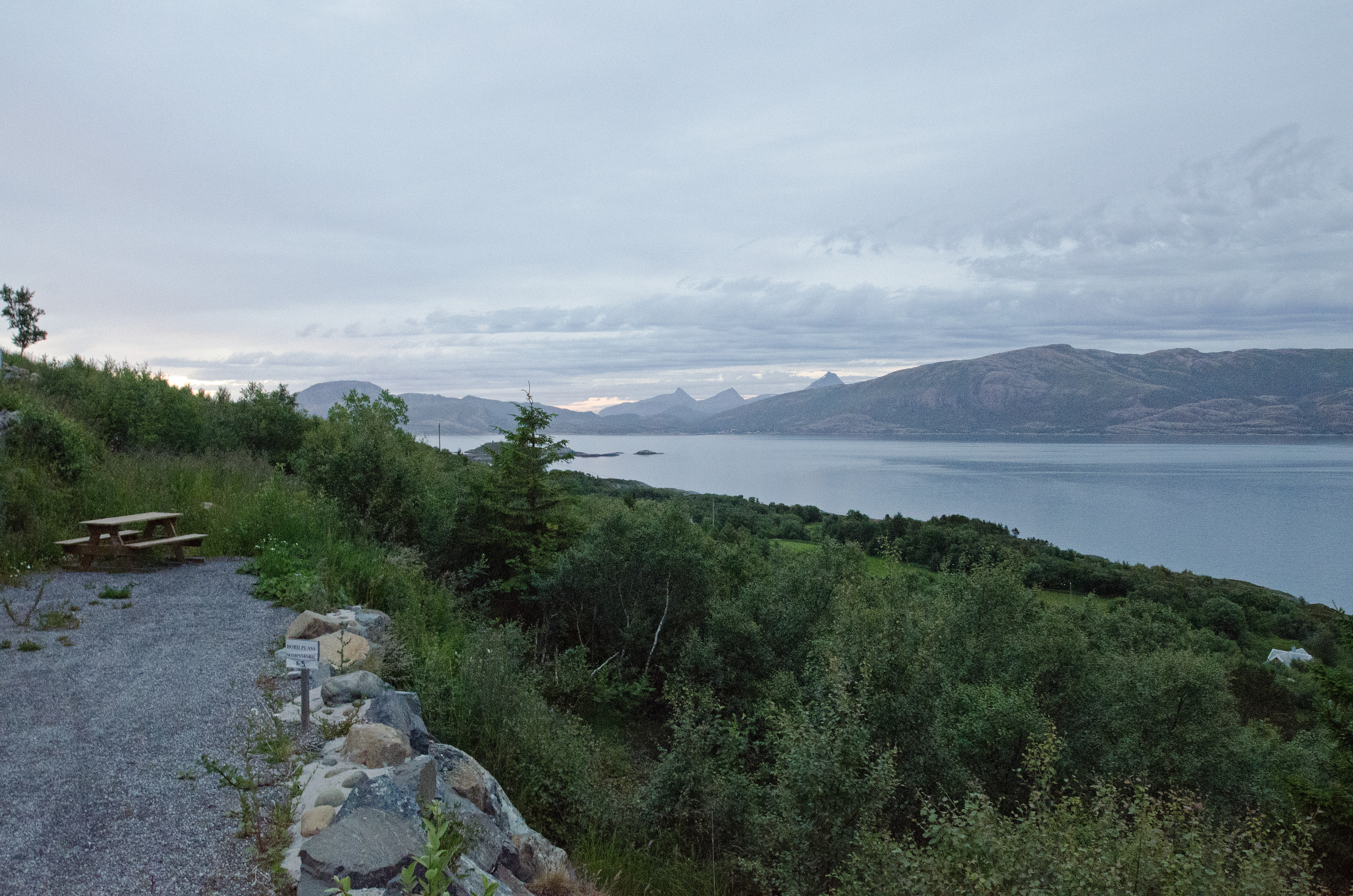
Lekafjorden seen from the island of Leka looking over Austra

Lekafjorden is a sound and fjord situated between the islands of Leka and Austra in the municipalities of Leka and Nærøysund, Trøndelag, Norway. The fjord is about 20 kilometers (12 mi) long.

In the south, Lekafjorden runs roughly east–west between the islands of Dolma and Madsøya, before turning in a northeastern direction past Leka and Austra. At the turning point, Årsetfjorden branches off eastwards and around the east side of Austra. To the south, Lekafjorden continues as Risværfjorden.

The Skei–Gutvik Ferry crosses the fjord.
