= Årset, Trøndelag =

Village in Nærøysund Municipality, Norway

Årset
- Village
- Interactive map of Årset
- Location within Trøndelag Location within Norway
- Coordinates: 65.0521°N 11.8788°E
- Country: Norway
- Region: Central Norway
- County: Trøndelag
- District: Namdalen
- Municipality: Nærøysund Municipality
- Elevation: 36 m (118 ft)
- Time zone: UTC+01:00 (CET)
  - Summer (DST): UTC+02:00 (CEST)
- Post Code: 7990 Naustbukta

Årset is a village in Nærøysund Municipality in Trøndelag county, Norway. The village is located along the shore of Årsetfjorden. on the southeast side of the island of Austra.
