= Lekaferja =

Norwegian ferry company

Innherredsferja AS
- Type: Subsidiary
- Industry: Transport
- Founded: 1964
- Headquarters: Leka Municipality, Norway
- Area served: Leka
- Parent: Torghatten Trafikkselskap

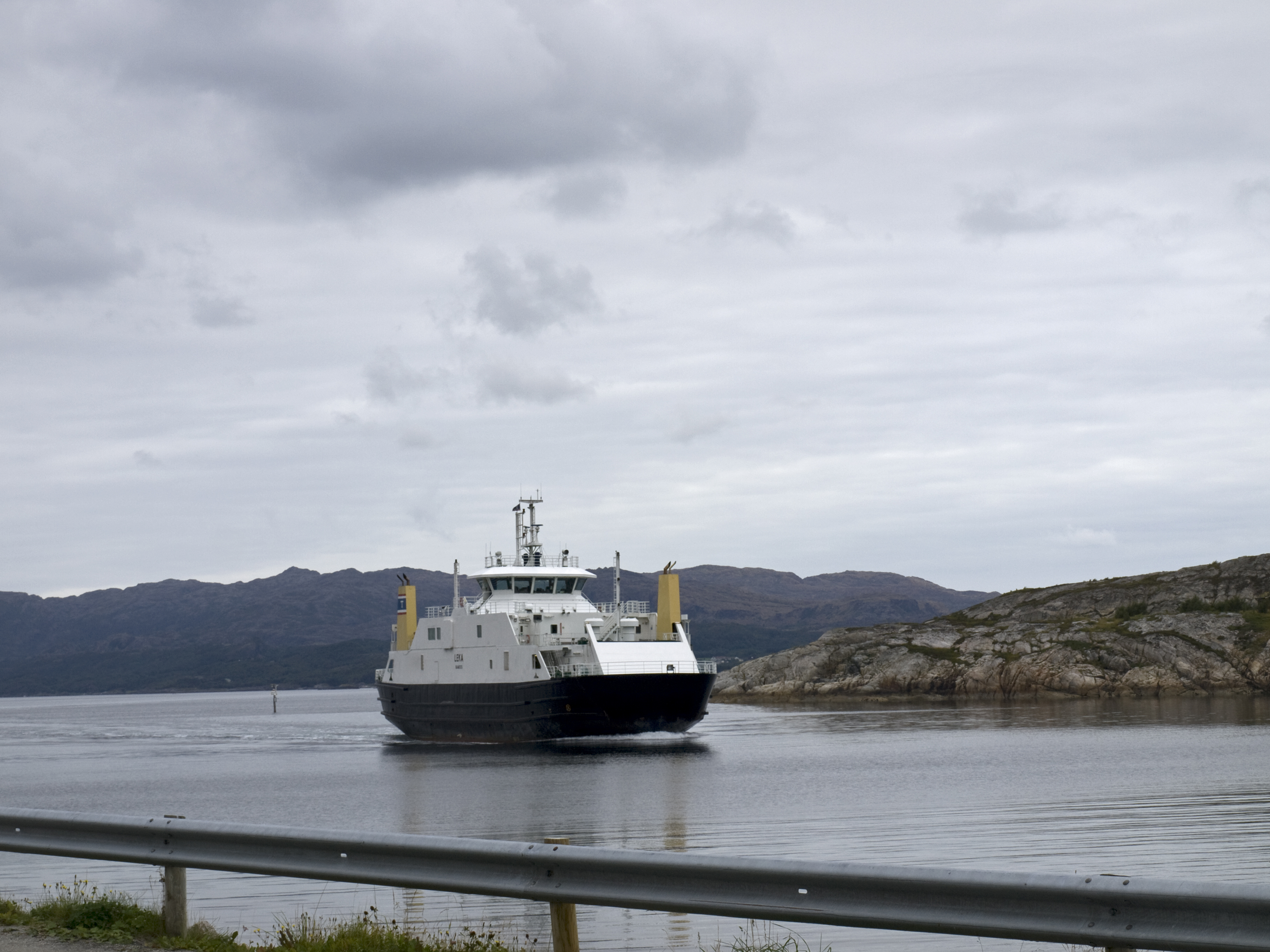
A ferry entering Gutvik

Lekaferja AS is a ferry company that operates the Skei–Gutvik Ferry with the car ferry MF Leka connecting Leka Municipality to mainland Norway. The company was created to operate the ferry service when it was created in 1964, and has operated three ferries, all with the name Leka. Lekaferja is owned by Torghatten Trafikkselskap.
