= Bogen, Austra =

Village in Bindal Municipality, Norway

Bogen
- Village
- Interactive map of Bogen
- Location within Nordland Location within Norway
- Coordinates: 65.0743°N 11.9469°E
- Country: Norway
- Region: Northern Norway
- County: Nordland
- District: Helgeland
- Municipality: Bindal Municipality
- Elevation: 9 m (30 ft)
- Time zone: UTC+01:00 (CET)
  - Summer (DST): UTC+02:00 (CEST)
- Post Code: 7982 Bindalseidet

Bogen is a small village in Bindal Municipality in Nordland county, Norway. It is located on the eastern shore of the island of Austra. It sits at the southern end of the Valen fjord arm, just across a narrow channel from the hamlet of Valen on the mainland.
