= Leka (island) =

Island in Trondelag, Norway

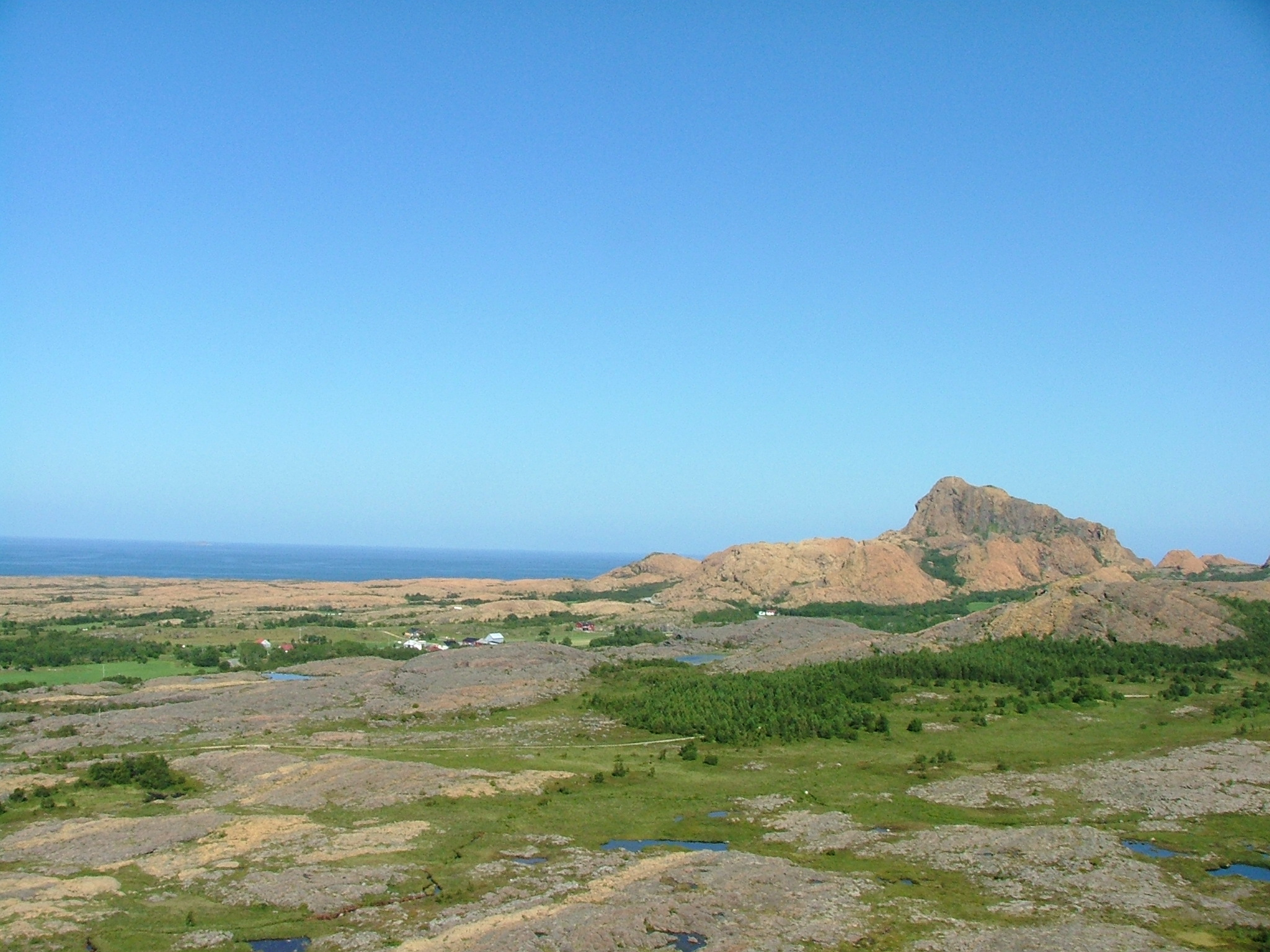
- View of the island's landscape
- Interactive map of Leka

Geography
- Location: Trøndelag, Norway
- Coordinates: 65.0969°N 11.6496°E
- Area: 57 km^{2} (22 sq mi)
- Length: 14.5 km (9.01 mi)
- Width: 6 km (3.7 mi)

Administration
- Norway
- County: Trøndelag
- Municipality: Leka Municipality

Leka is the main island in Leka Municipality in Trøndelag county, Norway. The 57-square-kilometre (22 sq mi) island makes up about half of the area of the municipality of Leka. The island is surrounded by dozens of smaller islands. The smaller island of Madsøya lies south of Leka, and it is connected to Leka by a short bridge. The larger island of Austra lies about 4 kilometres (2.5 mi) east of Leka. There is a ferry connection between Leka and Austra, and Austra is connected to the mainland by a bridge.

The village of Leknes is the administrative centre of Leka Municipality and it is located on the northeast part of the island. Leka Church is located on the island as well. The mountain Lekamøya lies on the southern part of the island.

== History ==
The island has been inhabited for at least 10,000 years, as evidenced by cave drawings in the Solsem cave at the southwest tip of the island. Dated to ca. 700 in the Merovinger Age, Herlaug Mound is one of the largest burial mounds in Norway and the oldest ship burial in Scandinavia.\

== Name ==
The Old Norse form of the name was Leka. The meaning of the name is unknown, but it may come from the word lekke which can mean "gravelly ground".

== Transport ==
The island is connected to the mainland via the Skei–Gutvik Ferry, with a quay at Skei. The ferry crosses Lekafjorden to the island of Austra, which is again connected to the mainland by bridge.

== See also ==
- List of islands of Norway
