= Årsetfjorden =

Fjord in Trøndelag, Norway

- Location within Norway Location within Trøndelag
- Interactive map of the fjord
- Location: Trøndelag and Nordland, Norway
- Coordinates: 65.0464°N 11.8820°E
- Type: Fjord
- Etymology: Årset
- Primary inflows: Årset
- Primary outflows: Lekafjorden
- Basin countries: Norway
- Max. length: 12 km (7.5 mi)
- Max. width: 1.2 km (0.75 mi)

Årsetfjorden is a smaller fjord off of the main Lekafjorden in Trøndelag and Nordland counties in Norway. The fjord lies mostly in Nærøysund Municipality (in Trøndelag county), but the far northern end of the fjord lies in Bindal Municipality (in Nordland county). The fjord gets its name from the small village of Årset on its northwestern side. The island of Austra lies on the west side of the fjord.

== See also ==
- List of Norwegian fjords
