= Leknes, Trøndelag =

Village in Leka Municipality, Norway

Leknes
- Village
- Interactive map of Leknes
- Location within Trøndelag Location within Norway
- Coordinates: 65.0924°N 11.7051°E
- Country: Norway
- Region: Central Norway
- County: Trøndelag
- District: Namdalen
- Municipality: Leka Municipality
- Elevation: 46 m (151 ft)
- Time zone: UTC+01:00 (CET)
  - Summer (DST): UTC+02:00 (CEST)
- Post Code: 7994 Leka

Leknes is the administrative centre of Leka Municipality in Trøndelag county, Norway. The village is located on the northeastern part of the island of Leka in the northwestern part of Trøndelag county. The local church, Leka Church, sits on the south side of the village. There is also a shop and an elementary school.
