= Passenger car equivalent =

Metric used in transportation engineering

Passenger car equivalent (PCE) or passenger car unit (PCU) is a metric used in transportation engineering to assess traffic-flow rate on a highway.

A passenger car equivalent is essentially the impact that a mode of transport has on traffic variables (such as headway, speed, density) compared to a single car.

Traffic studies and/or analysis must be done to obtain the number of trips, which shall then be converted to PCUs based on the above standards. Each region has its own manual with regards to PCU equivalence factors. Highway capacity is measured in PCE/hour daily.

A common method used in the US is the density method. However, the PCU values derived from the density method are based on underlying homogeneous traffic concepts such as strict lane discipline, car following, and a vehicle fleet that does not vary greatly in width.

On the other hand, highways in India carry heterogeneous traffic, where road space is shared among many traffic modes with different physical dimensions. Loose lane discipline prevails; car following is not the norm. This complicates computing of PCE.

Using multiple heuristic techniques, transportation engineers convert a mixed traffic stream into a hypothetical passenger-car stream.

== Methods ==
Many methods exist for determining passenger car units (PCUs).
Examples:

- homogenization coefficient,
- semi-empirical method,
- Walker's method,
- headway method,
- multiple linear regression method
- simulation method.

Transport for London recommends the following PCU values in an urban context:

- Pedal cycle 0.2
- Motorcycle 0.4
- Car or light goods vehicle 1.0
- Medium goods vehicle 1.5
- Bus or coach 2.0
- Heavy goods vehicle (HGV) 2.3

It may be appropriate to use different values for the same vehicle type according to circumstances. For example, in the UK in the 1960s and 1970s, bicycles were evaluated thus:

- on rural roads 0.5
- on urban roads 0.33
- on roundabouts 0.5
- at traffic lights 0.2.
