= Leka Municipality =

Municipality in Trøndelag, Norway

Leka Municipality Leka kommune
- Municipality
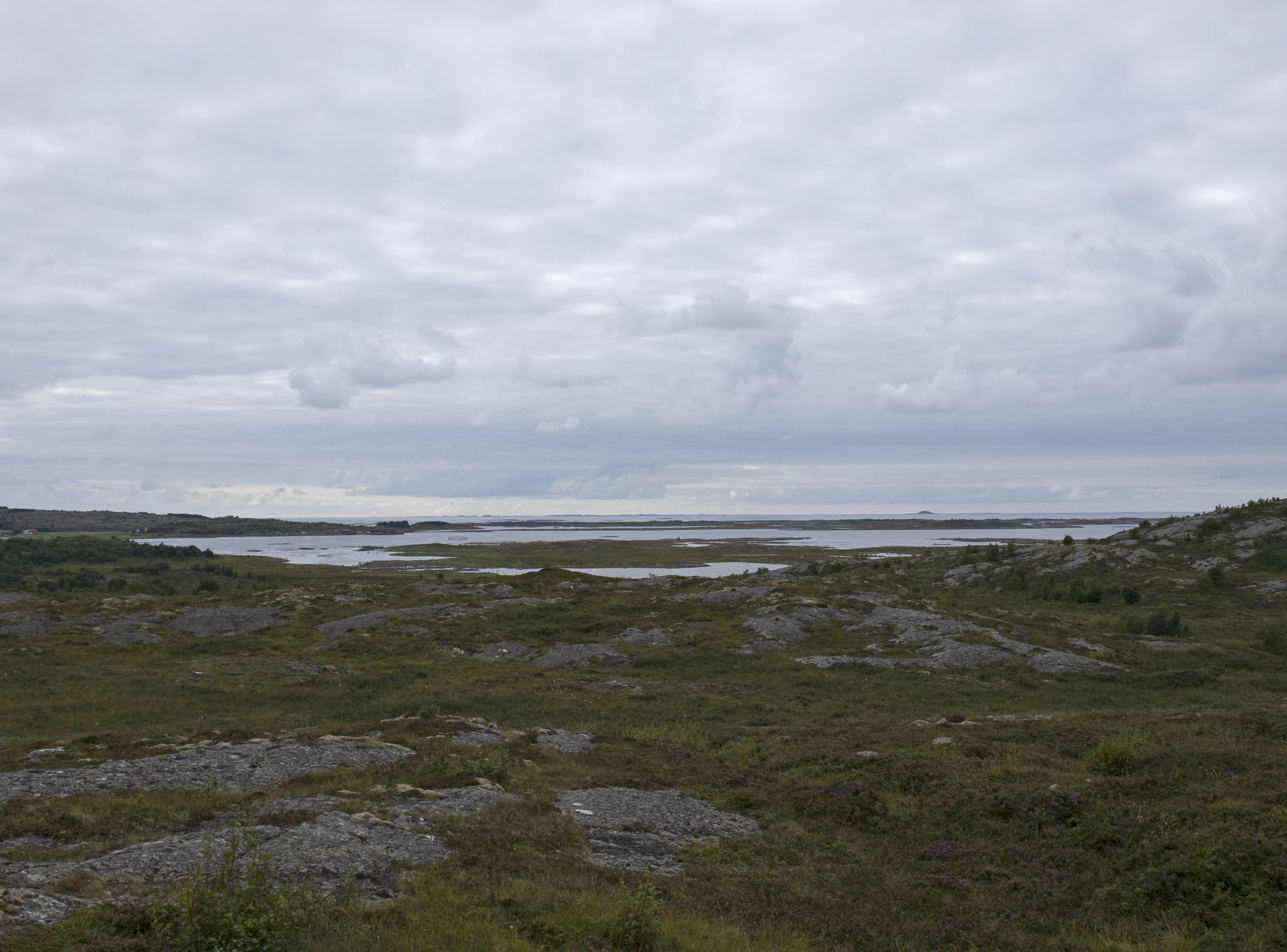
- Skeisnesset geological reserve

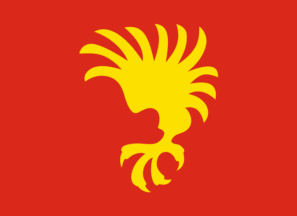
- Flag Coat of arms

- Trøndelag within Norway

- Leka within Trøndelag
- Coordinates: 65°05′17″N 11°37′01″E
- Country: Norway
- County: Trøndelag
- District: Namdalen
- Established: 1 Oct 1860
  - Preceded by: Kolvereid Municipality
- Administrative centre: Leknes

Area
  - Total: 110.12 km^{2} (42.52 sq mi)
  - Land: 108.33 km^{2} (41.83 sq mi)
  - Water: 1.79 km^{2} (0.69 sq mi) 1.6%
  - Rank: #326 in Norway
- Highest elevation: 588.28 m (1,930.1 ft)

Population (2024)
  - Total: 604
  - Rank: #349 in Norway
  - Density: 5.5/km^{2} (14/sq mi)
  - Change (10 years): ▲ +8.6%
- Demonym: Lekværing

Official language
  - Norwegian form: Neutral
- Time zone: UTC+01:00 (CET)
  - Summer (DST): UTC+02:00 (CEST)
- ISO 3166 code: NO-5052
- Website: Official website

Leka is a municipality in Trøndelag county, Norway. It is part of the Namdalen region. The administrative centre of the municipality is the village of Leknes on the island of Leka. Other villages in Leka include Sør-Gutvika and Madsøygrenda.

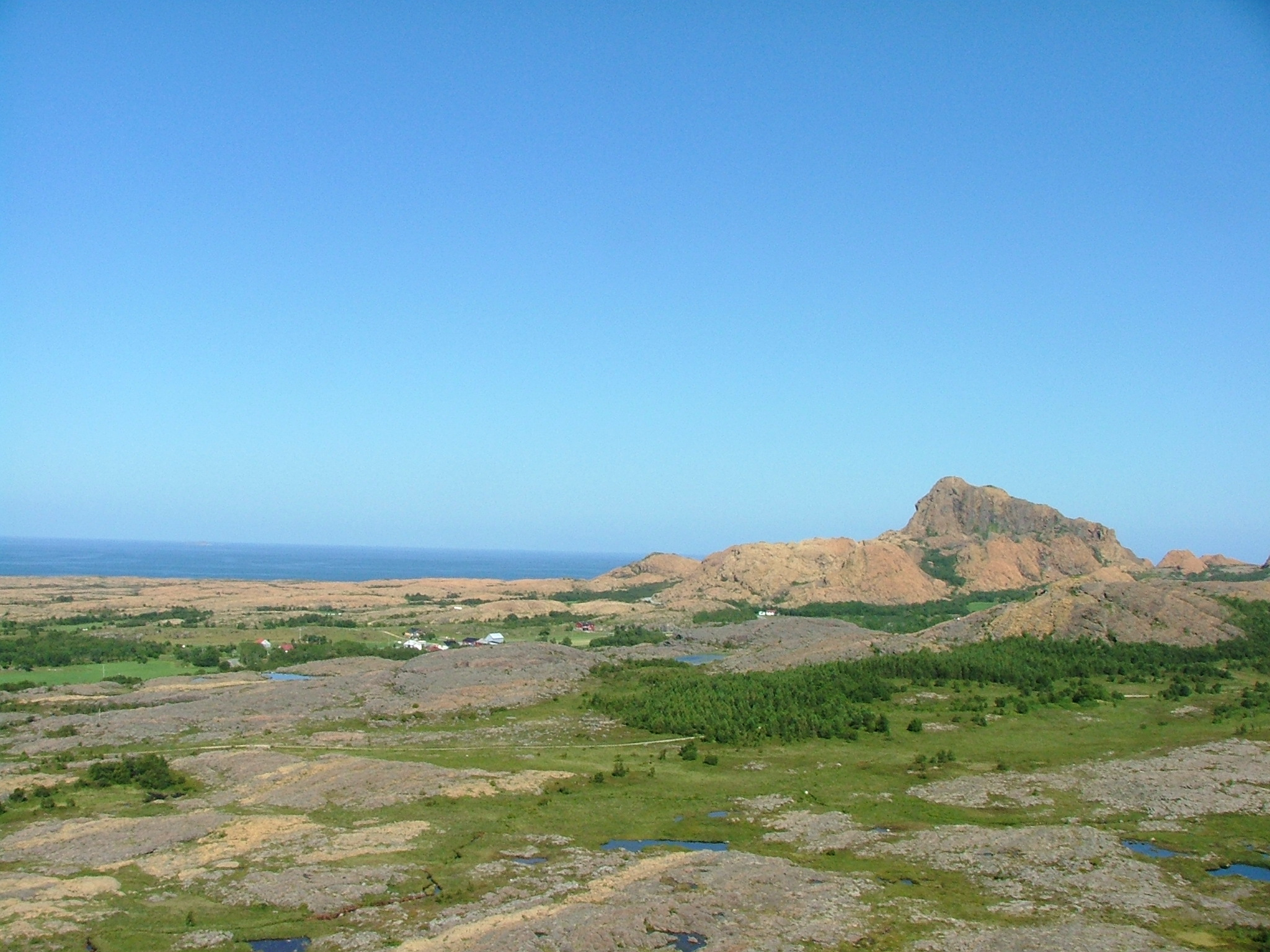
Leka island has a unique geology

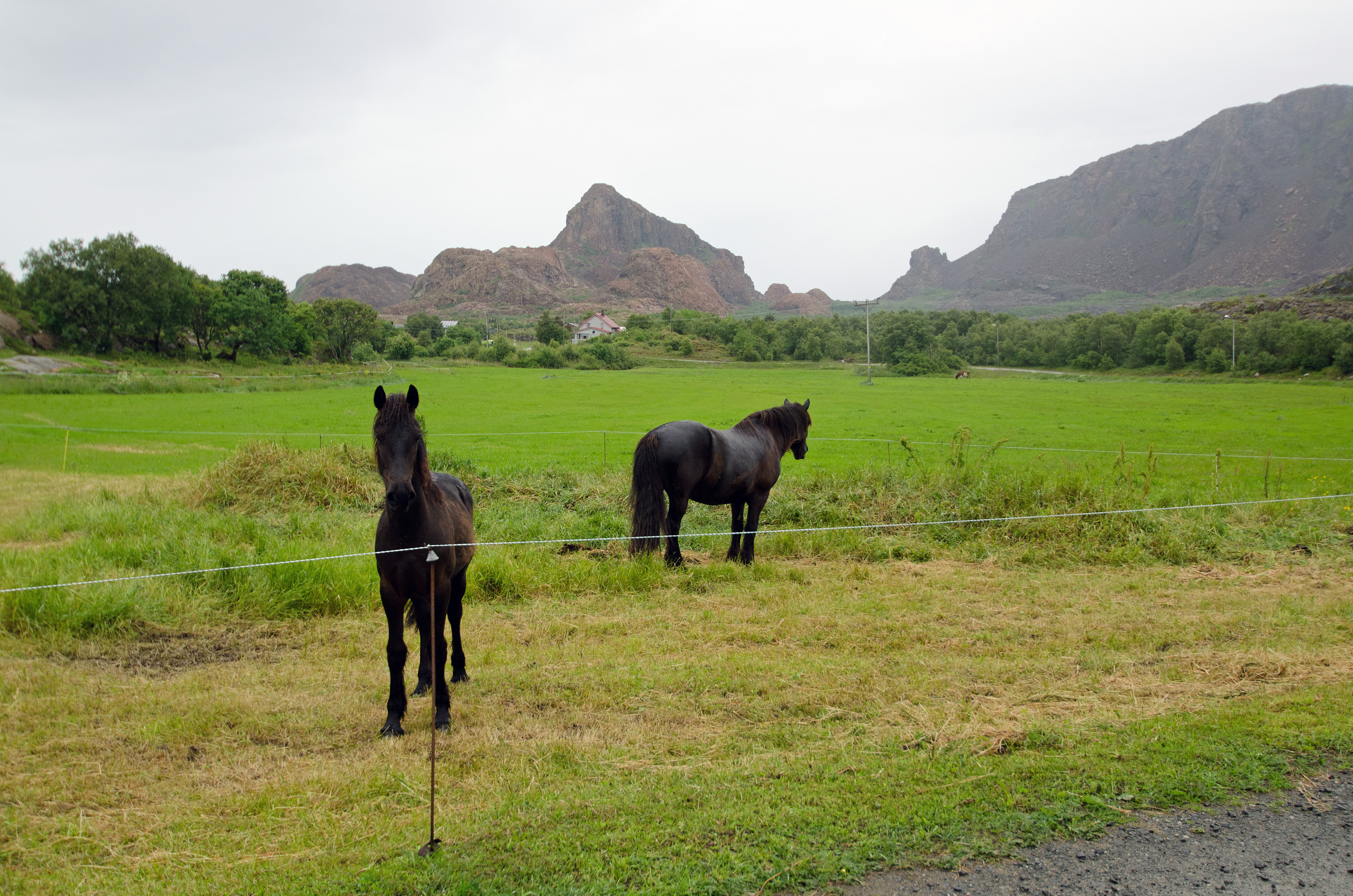
View of the island

The 110-square-kilometre (42 sq mi) municipality is the 326th largest by area out of the 357 municipalities in Norway. Leka Municipality is the 349th most populous municipality in Norway with a population of 604. The municipality's population density is 5.5 inhabitants per square kilometre (14/sq mi) and its population has increased by 8.6% over the previous 10-year period.

The island municipality includes all of the island of Leka and part of the island of Austra as well as hundreds of smaller surrounding islands and skerries. Primarily a fishing and farming community, Leka is the northernmost municipality in Trøndelag county. The island of Leka has been inhabited for at least 10,000 years, as evidenced by cave drawings in the Solsem cave at the southwest tip of the Leka island.

== General information ==
The municipality of Leka was established on 1 October 1860 when it was separated from the large Kolvereid Municipality. Initially, the population of Leka Municipality was 1,702. On 1 January 1909, the southern mainland district of Leka (population: 881) was separated to form the new Gravvik Municipality. This left Leka Municipality with 1,209 residents. The borders of Leka have not changed since then. On 1 January 2018, the municipality switched from the old Nord-Trøndelag county to the new Trøndelag county.

On 8 June 2017, the Norwegian Parliament, the Storting, voted to merge Leka Municipality with Vikna Municipality, Nærøy Municipality, and Bindal Municipality to form one, large municipality effective 1 January 2020. Both Leka and Bindal municipalities rejected the merger, but Vikna and Nærøy merged on that date to form the new Nærøysund Municipality.

=== Toponymy ===
The municipality (originally the parish) is named after the island of Leka (Old Norse: Leka) since the island makes up a large portion of the parish and municipality. The meaning of the name is unknown, but it may come from the word lekke which can mean "gravelly ground".

=== Coat of arms ===
The coat of arms was granted on 21 April 1989. The official blazon is "Gules, a winged claw Or" (Norwegian: I rødt en vinget gull klo). This means the arms have a red field (background) and the charge is a wing and claw of an eagle. The wing and claw design has a tincture of Or which means it is commonly colored yellow, but if it is made out of metal, then gold is used. This is a reference to an incident which supposedly occurred in 1932, in which a three-year-old girl disappeared on the island, and was subsequently discovered beneath the nest of a White-tailed eagle, high up on a cliff where no three-year-old could possibly have climbed. The arms were designed by Einar H. Skjervold.

=== Churches ===
The Church of Norway has one parish (sokn) within Leka Municipality. It is part of the Namdal prosti (deanery) in the Diocese of Nidaros.

Churches in Leka Municipality
Parish (sokn)	Church name	Location of the church	Year built
Leka	Leka Church	Leknes	1867

== Geography ==
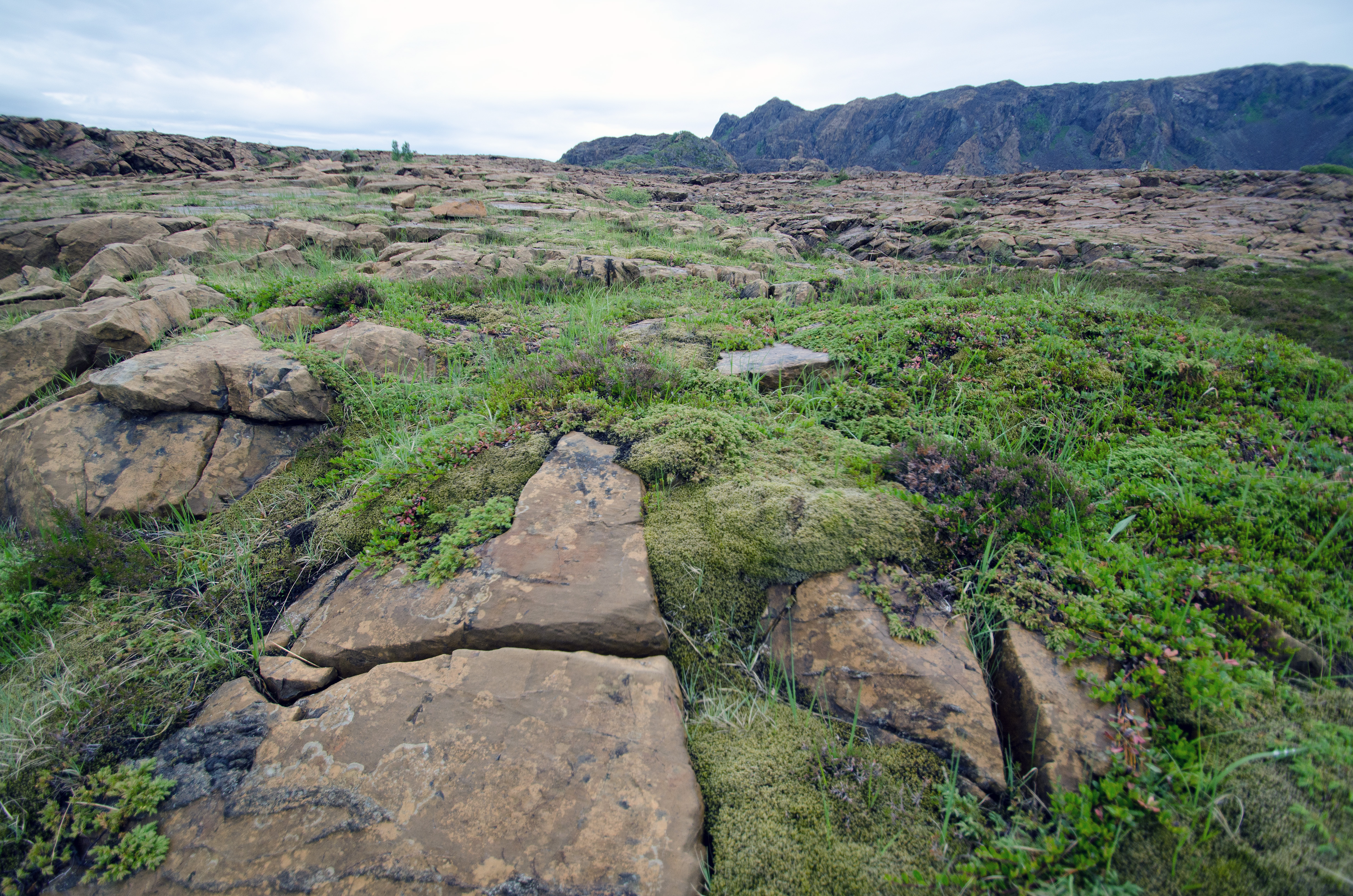
Geology of Leka

Leka is an island municipality encompassing the main island of Leka, the western part of the island of Austra (with the biggest locality being Gutvik), and many other small islands in the surrounding area. The tiny island groups of Sklinna and Horta lie to the west of the main islands.

Sklinna Lighthouse is located in the westernmost part of the municipality. Leka borders Nærøysund Municipality to the south and Bindal Municipality (in Nordland county) to the north. The highest point in the municipality is the 588.28-metre (1,930.1 ft) tall mountain Romsskåla.

== History ==
Dated to ca. 700 in the Merovinger Age, Herlaug Mound is one of the largest burial mounds in Norway and the oldest ship burial in Scandinavia.

== Government ==
Leka Municipality is responsible for primary education (through 10th grade), outpatient health services, senior citizen services, welfare and other social services, zoning, economic development, and municipal roads and utilities. The municipality is governed by a municipal council of directly elected representatives. The mayor is indirectly elected by a vote of the municipal council. The municipality is under the jurisdiction of the Trøndelag District Court and the Frostating Court of Appeal.

Municipal waste management has since 1994 been handled by the inter-municipal Midtre Namdal Avfallsselskap, with ReTrans Midt handling waste collection since 2018.

=== Municipal council ===
The municipal council (Kommunestyre) of Leka Municipality is made up of 13 representatives that are elected to four year terms. The tables below show the current and historical composition of the council by political party.

Leka kommunestyre 2023–2027
Party name (in Norwegian)	Number of representatives
Centre Party (Senterpartiet)	7
Socialist Left Party (Sosialistisk Venstreparti)	1
Joint list of the Labour Party (Arbeiderpartiet) and the Liberal Party (Venstre)	3
Leka Local List (Leka Bygdeliste)	2
Total number of members:	13

Leka kommunestyre 2019–2023
Party name (in Norwegian)	Number of representatives
Labour Party (Arbeiderpartiet)	6
Centre Party (Senterpartiet)	7
Socialist Left Party (Sosialistisk Venstreparti)	1
Liberal Party (Venstre)	1
Total number of members:	15

Leka kommunestyre 2015–2019
Party name (in Norwegian)	Number of representatives
Labour Party (Arbeiderpartiet)	3
Centre Party (Senterpartiet)	9
Socialist Left Party (Sosialistisk Venstreparti)	1
Liberal Party (Venstre)	2
Total number of members:	15

Leka kommunestyre 2011–2015
Party name (in Norwegian)	Number of representatives
Labour Party (Arbeiderpartiet)	4
Centre Party (Senterpartiet)	9
Socialist Left Party (Sosialistisk Venstreparti)	1
Liberal Party (Venstre)	1
Total number of members:	15

Leka kommunestyre 2007–2011
Party name (in Norwegian)	Number of representatives
Labour Party (Arbeiderpartiet)	3
Centre Party (Senterpartiet)	10
Socialist Left Party (Sosialistisk Venstreparti)	2
Total number of members:	15

Leka kommunestyre 2003–2007
Party name (in Norwegian)	Number of representatives
Labour Party (Arbeiderpartiet)	2
Socialist Left Party (Sosialistisk Venstreparti)	4
Joint list of the Conservative Party (Høyre), Centre Party (Senterpartiet), and Liberal Party (Venstre)	9
Total number of members:	15

Leka kommunestyre 1999–2003
Party name (in Norwegian)	Number of representatives
Labour Party (Arbeiderpartiet)	6
Socialist Left Party (Sosialistisk Venstreparti)	2
Joint list of the Conservative Party (Høyre), Centre Party (Senterpartiet), and Liberal Party (Venstre)	7
Total number of members:	15

Leka kommunestyre 1995–1999
Party name (in Norwegian)	Number of representatives
Labour Party (Arbeiderpartiet)	5
Socialist Left Party (Sosialistisk Venstreparti)	1
Joint list of the Conservative Party (Høyre), Centre Party (Senterpartiet), and Liberal Party (Venstre)	9
Total number of members:	15

Leka kommunestyre 1991–1995
Party name (in Norwegian)	Number of representatives
Labour Party (Arbeiderpartiet)	3
Socialist Left Party (Sosialistisk Venstreparti)	1
Joint list of the Conservative Party (Høyre), Centre Party (Senterpartiet), and Liberal Party (Venstre)	9
Non-party list, Gutvik election area (Upolitisk liste, Gutvik valgkret)	2
Total number of members:	15

Leka kommunestyre 1987–1991
Party name (in Norwegian)	Number of representatives
Labour Party (Arbeiderpartiet)	5
Socialist Left Party (Sosialistisk Venstreparti)	1
Joint list of the Conservative Party (Høyre), Centre Party (Senterpartiet), and Liberal Party (Venstre)	8
Local list for Gutvik election area (Bygdaliste for Gutvik valgkrets)	1
Total number of members:	15

Leka kommunestyre 1983–1987
Party name (in Norwegian)	Number of representatives
Labour Party (Arbeiderpartiet)	8
Socialist Left Party (Sosialistisk Venstreparti)	2
Joint list of the Conservative Party (Høyre), Centre Party (Senterpartiet), and Liberal Party (Venstre)	5
Total number of members:	15

Leka kommunestyre 1979–1983
Party name (in Norwegian)	Number of representatives
Labour Party (Arbeiderpartiet)	5
Conservative Party (Høyre)	1
Centre Party (Senterpartiet)	5
Liberal Party (Venstre)	1
Local list for Gutvik area (Bygdaliste for Gutvik krets)	3
Total number of members:	15

Leka kommunestyre 1975–1979
Party name (in Norwegian)	Number of representatives
Labour Party (Arbeiderpartiet)	4
Centre Party (Senterpartiet)	6
Collaborative List (Samarbeidslista)	3
Total number of members:	13

Leka kommunestyre 1971–1975
Party name (in Norwegian)	Number of representatives
Labour Party (Arbeiderpartiet)	7
Joint List(s) of Non-Socialist Parties (Borgerlige Felleslister)	6
Local List(s) (Lokale lister)	1
Total number of members:	13

Leka kommunestyre 1967–1971
Party name (in Norwegian)	Number of representatives
Labour Party (Arbeiderpartiet)	6
Joint List(s) of Non-Socialist Parties (Borgerlige Felleslister)	7
Total number of members:	13

Leka kommunestyre 1963–1967
Party name (in Norwegian)	Number of representatives
Labour Party (Arbeiderpartiet)	8
Christian Democratic Party (Kristelig Folkeparti)	1
Centre Party (Senterpartiet)	2
Liberal Party (Venstre)	2
Total number of members:	13

Leka herredsstyre 1959–1963
Party name (in Norwegian)	Number of representatives
Labour Party (Arbeiderpartiet)	7
Christian Democratic Party (Kristelig Folkeparti)	2
Centre Party (Senterpartiet)	3
Liberal Party (Venstre)	1
Total number of members:	13

Leka herredsstyre 1955–1959
Party name (in Norwegian)	Number of representatives
Labour Party (Arbeiderpartiet)	8
Joint List(s) of Non-Socialist Parties (Borgerlige Felleslister)	5
Total number of members:	13

Leka herredsstyre 1951–1955
Party name (in Norwegian)	Number of representatives
Labour Party (Arbeiderpartiet)	8
Joint List(s) of Non-Socialist Parties (Borgerlige Felleslister)	4
Total number of members:	12

Leka herredsstyre 1947–1951
Party name (in Norwegian)	Number of representatives
Labour Party (Arbeiderpartiet)	6
Joint List(s) of Non-Socialist Parties (Borgerlige Felleslister)	6
Total number of members:	12

Leka herredsstyre 1945–1947
Party name (in Norwegian)	Number of representatives
Labour Party (Arbeiderpartiet)	8
Local List(s) (Lokale lister)	4
Total number of members:	12

Leka herredsstyre 1937–1941*
Party name (in Norwegian)	Number of representatives
Labour Party (Arbeiderpartiet)	2
Joint List(s) of Non-Socialist Parties (Borgerlige Felleslister)	7
Local List(s) (Lokale lister)	3
Total number of members:	12
Note: Due to the German occupation of Norway during World War II, no elections were held for new municipal councils until after the war ended in 1945.

=== Mayors ===
The mayor (Norwegian: ordfører) of Leka Municipality is the political leader of the municipality and the chairperson of the municipal council. Here is a list of people who have held this position:

- 1860–1865: N. Henriksen
- 1866–1871: C. Samuelsen
- 1872–1877: Otto Bach
- 1878–1881: Karl August Jensen
- 1882–1885: Johannes Furre (H)
- 1886–1887: Otto Bach (H)
- 1888–1891: Karl August Jensen (H)
- 1892–1895: Svend Rasmussen (H)
- 1896–1898: Karl August Jensen (H)
- 1899–1901: Johannes Furre (H)
- 1902–1904: Karl August Jensen (H)
- 1905–1909: Ludvig Bach
- 1910–1919: Peder Aleksander Furre
- 1920–1925: Ingvard Hiller (V)
- 1926–1928: Peder Aleksander Furre (Bp)
- 1929–1931: Edvard Haug (Bp)
- 1932–1937: Ingvard Hiller (V)
- 1938–1942: Edvard Haug (Bp)
- 1943–1945: Ole Nøstdal (NS)
- 1945–1945: Edvard Haug (Bp)
- 1946–1947: Hans Mikal Solsem (Ap)
- 1948–1951: Anders Leknes (Bp)
- 1952–1957: Hans Mikal Solsem (Ap)
- 1957–1958: Egil Hanssen (Ap)
- 1958–1959: Hans Mikal Solsem (Ap)
- 1960–1967: Jonas Lund (Ap)
- 1968–1969: Andreas Hansen (Sp)
- 1970–1971: Leif Rohnes (V)
- 1972–1975: Jonas Lund (Ap)
- 1976–1978: Arne Skillingstad (Sp)
- 1978–1979: Leif Rohnes (V)
- 1979–1979: Anders Kolstad (Sp)
- 1980–1983: Trond Pettersen (Sp)
- 1984–1987: Inge Aune (Ap)
- 1988–1995: Arve Haug (Sp)
- 1995–1999: Margrethe Holmboe Askeland (Sp)
- 1999–2002: Elisabeth Helmersen (Ap)
- 2002–2003: Mari-Anne Hoff (SV)
- 2003–2011: Arve Haug (Sp)
- 2011–2019: Per Helge Johansen (Sp)
- 2019–2023: Elisabeth Helmersen (Ap)
- 2023–present: Svein Pettersen (Sp)

=== Politics ===
In the 2007 municipal elections, Leka had the highest vote for the Centre Party in Norway, at 69.3 per cent.

== Transportation ==
The island of Leka (at the village of Skei) is connected to the village of Gutvik (on the island of Austra) by the Skei–Gutvik Ferry. Austra is connected to the mainland by a bridge at the village of Bogen.

== Notable people ==
- Christopher Brinchmann (1864 in Leka – 1940), an archivist, literary historian, and critic
- Annfinn Lund (1926 in Leka – 2001), a Norwegian civil servant and politician who was the County Governor of Hedmark in 1980–1981
- Thomas Hjalmar Westgård (born 1995 in Leka), an Irish cross-country skier who competed in the 2018 Winter Olympics
