= Austra, Norway =

Island in northern Norway

Austra
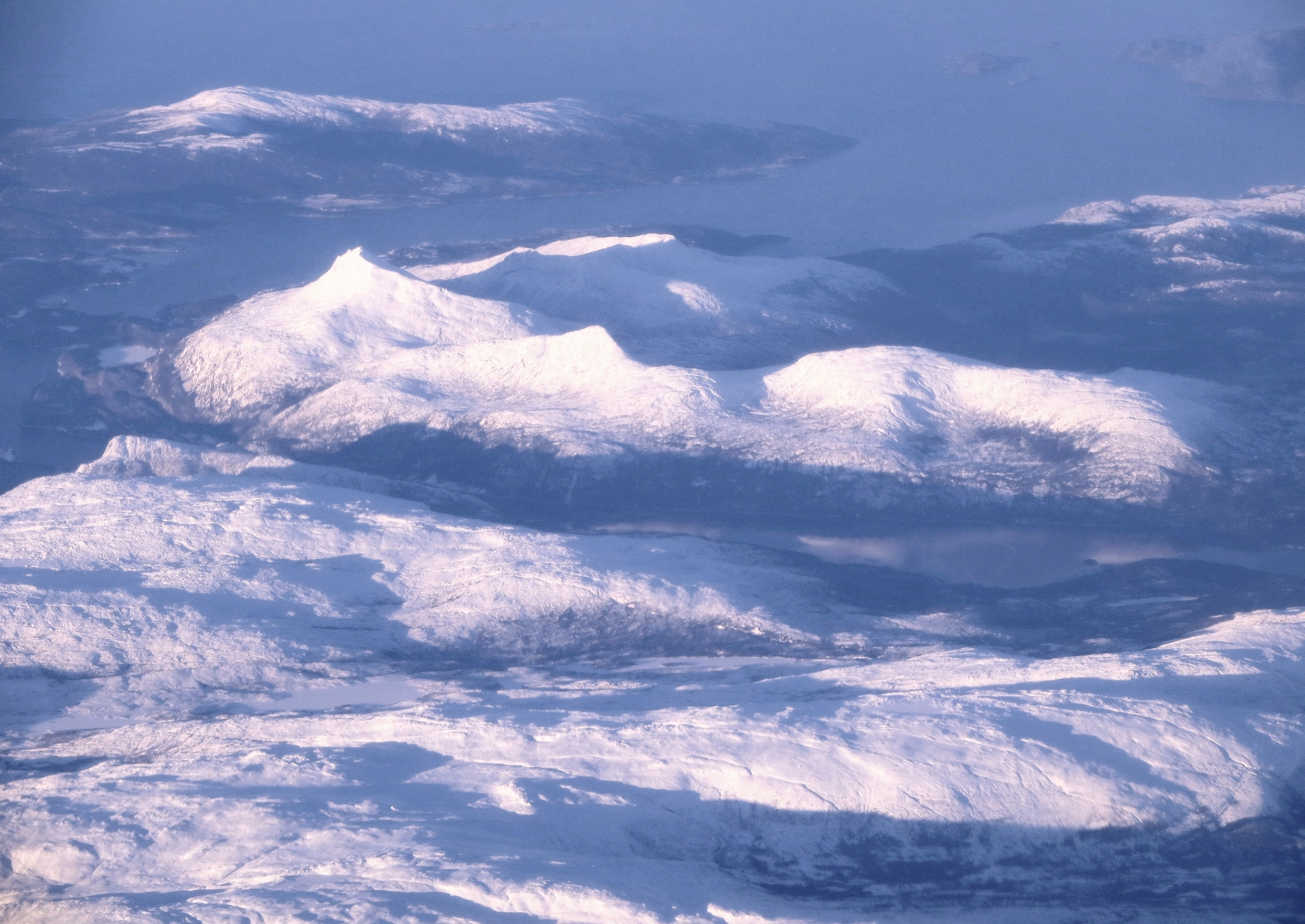
- Aerial view from the east towards west, of Bindal municipality in Nordland county, Norway.
- Interactive map of Austra

Geography
- Location: Trøndelag and Nordland, Norway
- Coordinates: 65.0837°N 11.8769°E
- Area: 88 km^{2} (34 sq mi)
- Length: 21 km (13 mi)
- Width: 6.5 km (4.04 mi)
- Coastline: 61 km (37.9 mi)
- Highest elevation: 588 m (1929 ft)
- Highest point: Romsskåla

Administration
- Norway
- Counties: Trøndelag and Nordland
- Municipality: Nærøysund, Leka, Bindal

Demographics
- Population: c. 300 (2001)
- Pop. density: 3.4/km^{2} (8.8/sq mi)

Austra is an island on the border between Trøndelag and Nordland counties in Norway. The 88-square-kilometre (34 sq mi) island is shared between Bindal Municipality, Leka Municipality, and Nærøysund Municipality. The highest point is the 588-metre-tall (1,929 ft) Romsskåla. The village of Årset lies on the southeastern shore, along the Årsetfjorden. The village of Bogen lies on the east coast of the island where the bridge connects it to the mainland. The village of Horsfjord lies on the northern coast. The village of Gutvik lies on the western coast

The island, as of 2001, had a population of 300 people.

== See also ==
- List of islands of Norway
