= Vikna Municipality =

Former municipality in Trøndelag, Norway

Vikna Municipality Vikna kommune
- Former municipality
- Vikten herred (historic name)
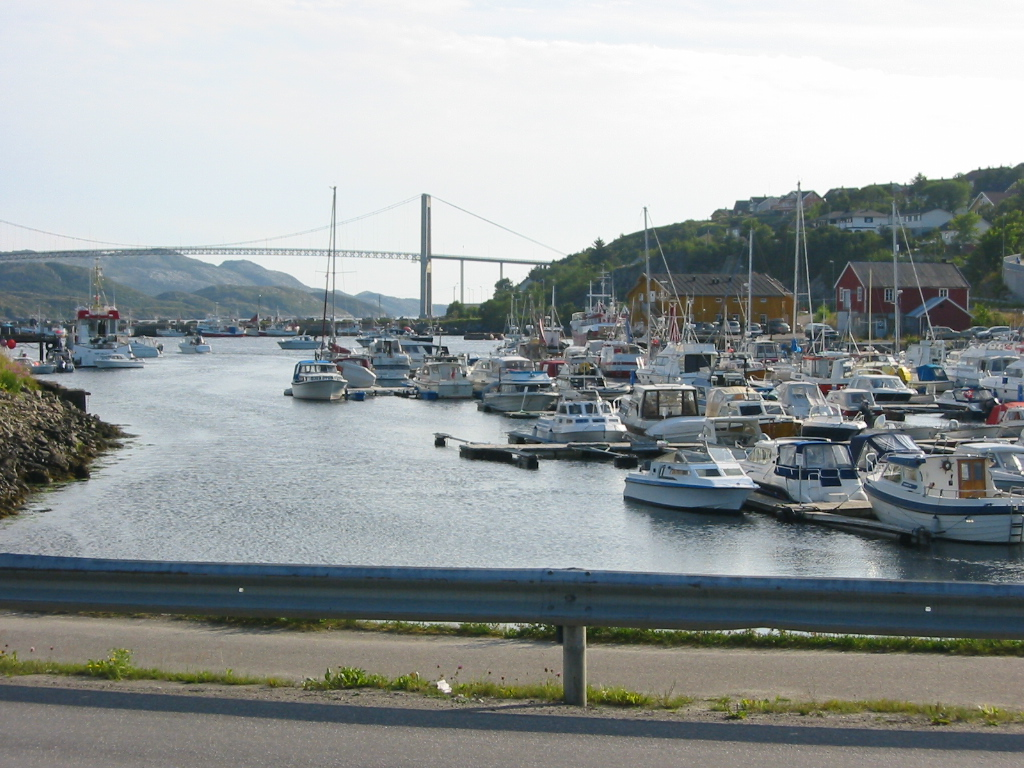
- View of Rørvik

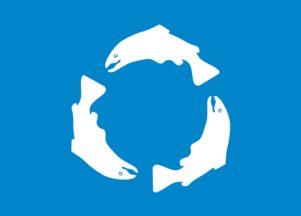
- Flag Coat of arms

- Trøndelag within Norway

- Vikna within Trøndelag
- Coordinates: 64°54′42″N 11°01′55″E
- Country: Norway
- County: Trøndelag
- District: Namdalen
- Established: 1 July 1869
  - Preceded by: Nærøy Municipality
- Disestablished: 1 Jan 2020
  - Succeeded by: Nærøysund Municipality
- Administrative centre: Rørvik

Government
  - Mayor (2015-2019): Amund Hellesø (AP)

Area (upon dissolution)
  - Total: 318.70 km^{2} (123.05 sq mi)
  - Land: 311.18 km^{2} (120.15 sq mi)
  - Water: 7.52 km^{2} (2.90 sq mi) 2.4%
  - Rank: #269 in Norway
- Highest elevation: 172.9 m (567 ft)

Population (2019)
  - Total: 4,578
  - Rank: #216 in Norway
  - Density: 14.4/km^{2} (37/sq mi)
  - Change (10 years): ▲ +11.7%
- Demonym(s): Viknværing; Viknaværing

Official language
  - Norwegian form: Neutral
- Time zone: UTC+01:00 (CET)
  - Summer (DST): UTC+02:00 (CEST)
- ISO 3166 code: NO-5050

Vikna is a former municipality in Trøndelag county, Norway. The island municipality existed from 1869 until its dissolution in 2020. It is now part of Nærøysund Municipality in the Namdalen region. The administrative centre of the municipality was the village of Rørvik. Other villages in Vikna included Austafjord, Garstad, and Valøya.

At the time of its dissolution in 2020, the 319-square-kilometre (123 sq mi) municipality was the 269th largest by area out of the 422 municipalities in Norway. Vikna Municipality was the 216th most populous municipality in Norway with a population of 4,578. The municipality's population density was 14.4 inhabitants per square kilometre (37/sq mi) and its population had increased by 11.4% over the last decade.

== General information ==
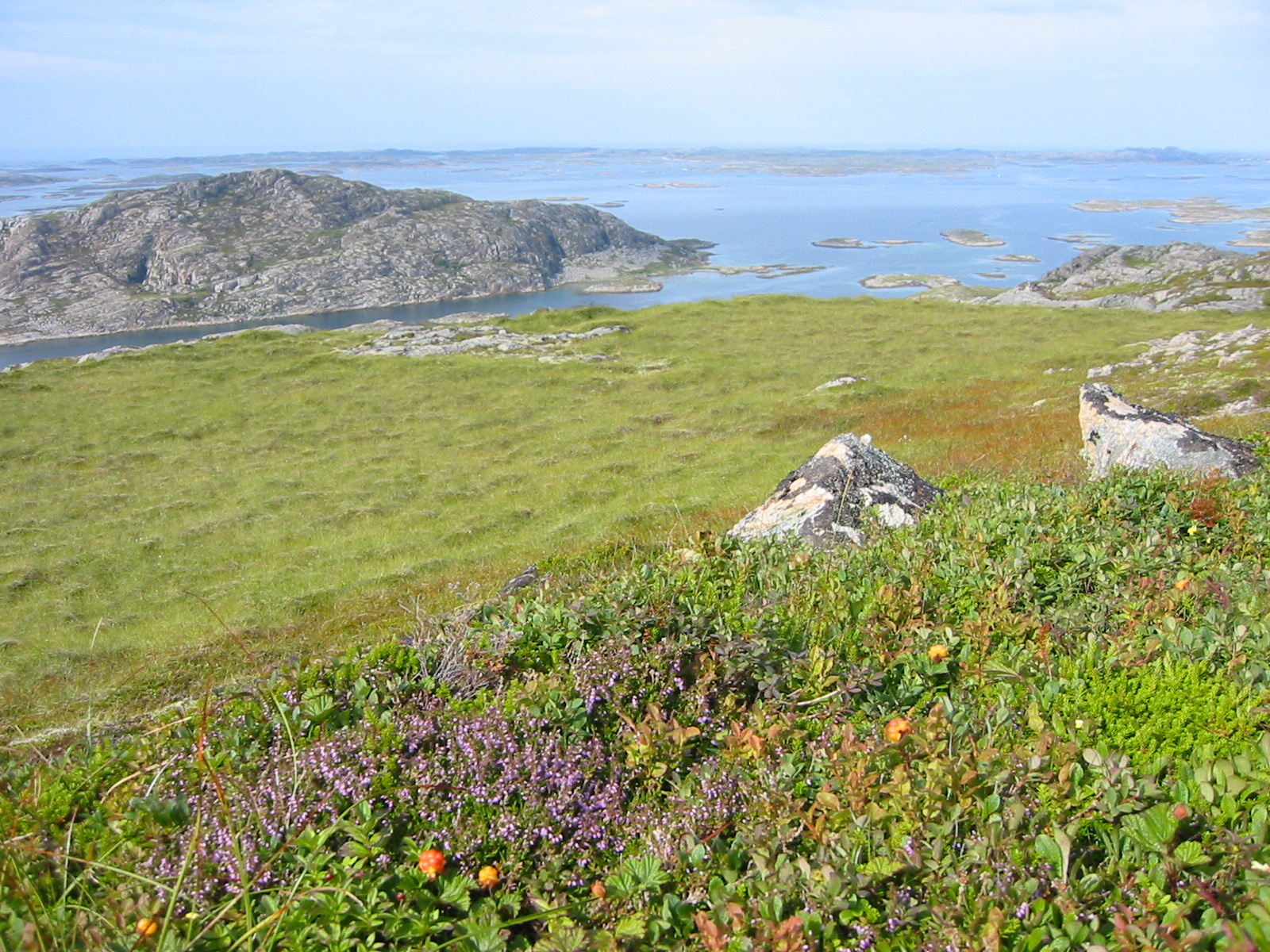
Ytre Vikna.

The municipality of Vikten was established on 1 July 1869 when it was separated from the large Nærøy Municipality. Initially, the population of Vikten Municipality was 1,749. On 1 January 1881, a small area of Fosnes Municipality (population: 61) was transferred to Vikten Municipality. The spelling of the name was later changed to Vikna Municipality.

On 1 January 2018, the municipality switched from the old Nord-Trøndelag county to the new Trøndelag county.

On 1 January 2020, Vikna Municipality was merged with most of the neighboring Nærøy Municipality to form the new Nærøysund Municipality. The Lund area of Nærøy Municipality was not part of the merger, however, instead it became part of the newly enlarged Namsos Municipality on the same date.

=== Name ===
The municipality (originally the parish) is named "Vikna". It was named after the three large islands which made up the municipality: Inner-Vikna, Mellom-Vikna, and Ytter-Vikna (Old Norse: Víkn). The name is derived from the word vík which means "cove" or "wick" (likely since the islands have numerous coves and inlets). Historically, the name of the municipality was spelled Vikten. On 3 November 1917, a royal resolution changed the spelling of the name of the municipality to Vikna.

=== Coat of arms ===
The coat of arms was granted on 13 May 1988 and it was in use until 1 January 2020 when the municipality was dissolved. The official blazon is "Azure, three salmon argent in annulo" (Norwegian: I blått tre sølv lakser som danner en sirkel). This means the arms have a blue field (background) and the charge is three salmon forming a circle. The fish design has a tincture of argent which means it is commonly colored white, but if it is made out of metal, then silver is used. This design was chosen to symbolize the importance of salmon fishing and farming in the municipality. The arms were designed by Torleif Flosand. The municipal flag has the same design as the coat of arms.

=== Churches ===
The Church of Norway had one parish (sokn) within Vikna Municipality. It was part of the Namdal prosti (deanery) in the Diocese of Nidaros.

Churches in Vikna Municipality
Parish (sokn)	Church name	Location of the church	Year built
Vikna	Garstad Church	Garstad	1856
Vikna	Rørvik Church	Rørvik	1896
Vikna	Valøy Chapel	Valøya	1972

== Geography ==
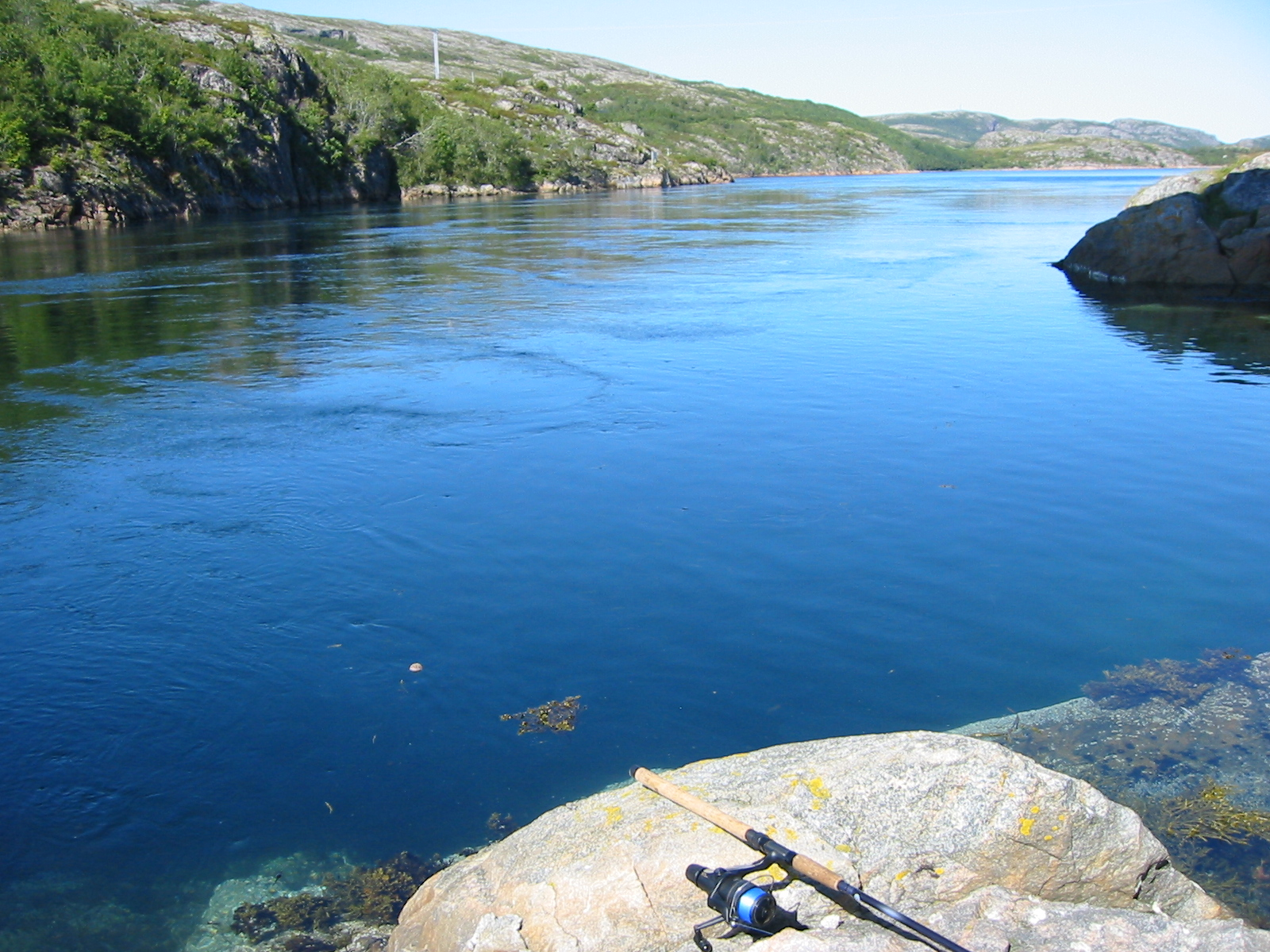
Langsundet strait

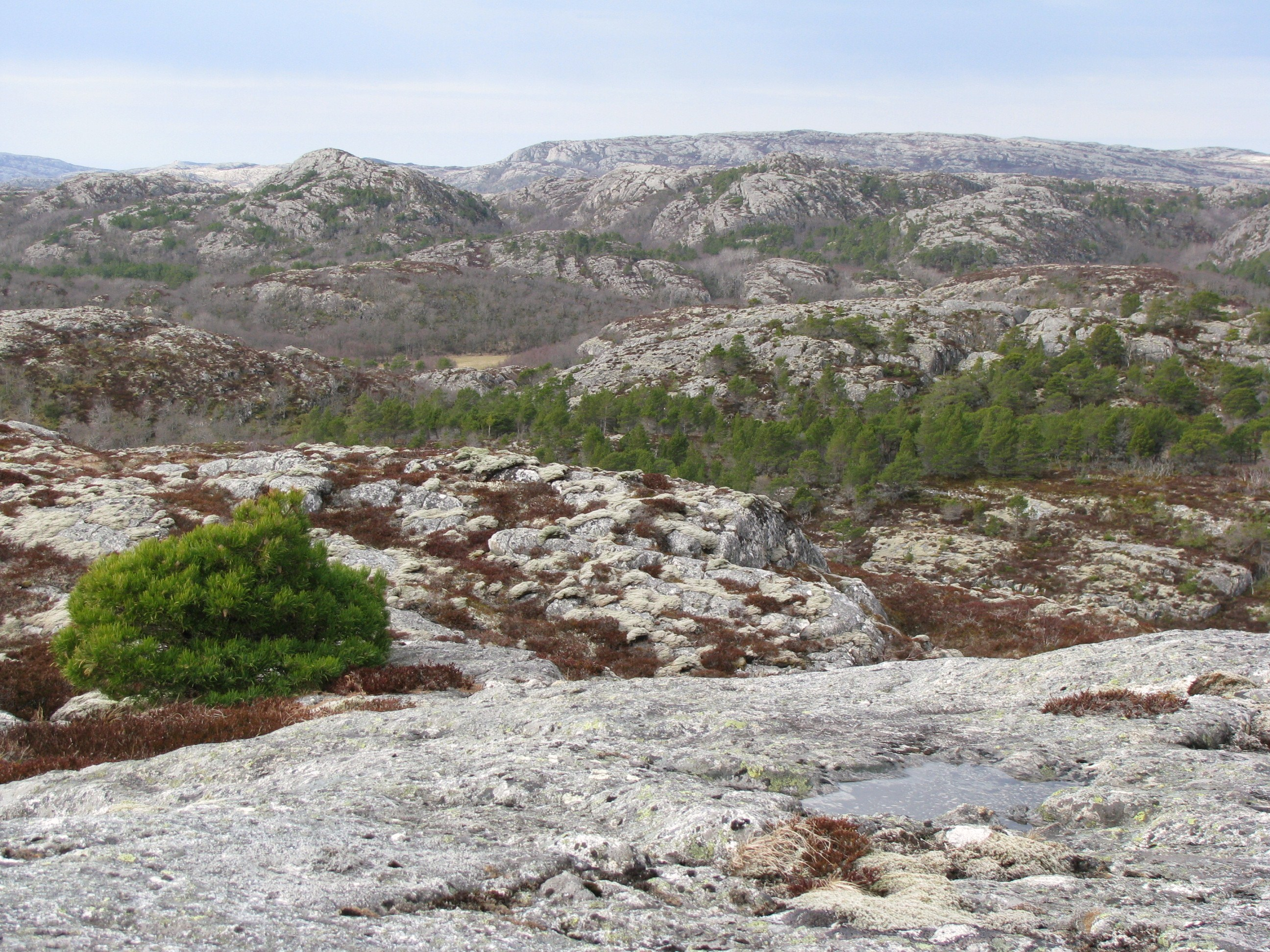
Vikna landscape in spring. 2009.

The municipality consisted of a large island archipelago with some 6,000 large and small islands going far into the Norwegian Sea off the northwestern coast of Trøndelag county. Vikna is the largest spawning area for cod south of Lofoten. The three largest islands are: Inner-Vikna, closest to the mainland, Mellom-Vikna, and then Ytter-Vikna as the westernmost island. Other islands include Borgan and Lauvøya. The highest point in the municipality was the 172.9-metre (567 ft) tall mountain Vattafjellet on the island of Ytter-Vikna.

The main village for the municipality was Rørvik, located on the eastern shore of Inner-Vikna, facing the mainland across the Nærøysundet strait. The many islands in the area means that there are many lighthouses including Gjeslingene Lighthouse, Grinna Lighthouse, Nærøysund Lighthouse, and Nordøyan Lighthouse.

On 21 October 1962, the coastal steamer (Hurtigruten) Sanct Svithun run aground on Nordøyan as a result of navigational error. The ship sunk, and there was a tragic loss of 41 lives. A memorial bauta was raised on Nordøyan in 2002.

== Government ==
While it existed, Vikna Municipality was responsible for primary education (through 10th grade), outpatient health services, senior citizen services, welfare and other social services, zoning, economic development, and municipal roads and utilities. The municipality was governed by a municipal council of directly elected representatives. The mayor was indirectly elected by a vote of the municipal council. The municipality was under the jurisdiction of the Namdal District Court and the Frostating Court of Appeal.

Municipal waste management was since 1993 handled by the inter-municipal Midtre Namdal Avfallsselskap.

=== Municipal council ===
The municipal council (Kommunestyre) of Vikna Municipality was made up of 23 representatives that are elected to four year terms. The tables below show the historical composition of the council by political party.

Vikna kommunestyre 2015–2019
Party name (in Norwegian)	Number of representatives
Labour Party (Arbeiderpartiet)	8
Progress Party (Fremskrittspartiet)	2
Conservative Party (Høyre)	1
Christian Democratic Party (Kristelig Folkeparti)	1
Centre Party (Senterpartiet)	3
Socialist Left Party (Sosialistisk Venstreparti)	1
Liberal Party (Venstre)	7
Total number of members:	23
Note: On 1 January 2020, Vikna Municipality became part of Nærøysund Municipality.

Vikna kommunestyre 2011–2015
Party name (in Norwegian)	Number of representatives
Labour Party (Arbeiderpartiet)	6
Progress Party (Fremskrittspartiet)	4
Conservative Party (Høyre)	4
Christian Democratic Party (Kristelig Folkeparti)	2
Centre Party (Senterpartiet)	3
Socialist Left Party (Sosialistisk Venstreparti)	1
Liberal Party (Venstre)	3
Total number of members:	23

Vikna kommunestyre 2007–2011
Party name (in Norwegian)	Number of representatives
Labour Party (Arbeiderpartiet)	5
Progress Party (Fremskrittspartiet)	5
Conservative Party (Høyre)	2
Christian Democratic Party (Kristelig Folkeparti)	5
Centre Party (Senterpartiet)	2
Socialist Left Party (Sosialistisk Venstreparti)	1
Liberal Party (Venstre)	3
Total number of members:	23

Vikna kommunestyre 2003–2007
Party name (in Norwegian)	Number of representatives
Labour Party (Arbeiderpartiet)	5
Progress Party (Fremskrittspartiet)	3
Conservative Party (Høyre)	4
Christian Democratic Party (Kristelig Folkeparti)	4
Centre Party (Senterpartiet)	2
Socialist Left Party (Sosialistisk Venstreparti)	2
Liberal Party (Venstre)	3
Total number of members:	23

Vikna kommunestyre 1999–2003
Party name (in Norwegian)	Number of representatives
Labour Party (Arbeiderpartiet)	6
Progress Party (Fremskrittspartiet)	2
Conservative Party (Høyre)	6
Christian Democratic Party (Kristelig Folkeparti)	2
Centre Party (Senterpartiet)	3
Socialist Left Party (Sosialistisk Venstreparti)	2
Liberal Party (Venstre)	2
Total number of members:	23

Vikna kommunestyre 1995–1999
Party name (in Norwegian)	Number of representatives
Labour Party (Arbeiderpartiet)	7
Progress Party (Fremskrittspartiet)	2
Conservative Party (Høyre)	3
Centre Party (Senterpartiet)	8
Socialist Left Party (Sosialistisk Venstreparti)	1
Liberal Party (Venstre)	2
Total number of members:	23

Vikna kommunestyre 1991–1995
Party name (in Norwegian)	Number of representatives
Labour Party (Arbeiderpartiet)	8
Progress Party (Fremskrittspartiet)	1
Conservative Party (Høyre)	3
Centre Party (Senterpartiet)	7
Socialist Left Party (Sosialistisk Venstreparti)	2
Liberal Party (Venstre)	2
Total number of members:	23

Vikna kommunestyre 1987–1991
Party name (in Norwegian)	Number of representatives
Labour Party (Arbeiderpartiet)	10
Progress Party (Fremskrittspartiet)	3
Conservative Party (Høyre)	3
Christian Democratic Party (Kristelig Folkeparti)	1
Centre Party (Senterpartiet)	3
Socialist Left Party (Sosialistisk Venstreparti)	1
Liberal Party (Venstre)	2
Total number of members:	23

Vikna kommunestyre 1983–1987
Party name (in Norwegian)	Number of representatives
Labour Party (Arbeiderpartiet)	11
Conservative Party (Høyre)	5
Christian Democratic Party (Kristelig Folkeparti)	1
Centre Party (Senterpartiet)	3
Socialist Left Party (Sosialistisk Venstreparti)	1
Liberal Party (Venstre)	2
Total number of members:	23

Vikna kommunestyre 1979–1983
Party name (in Norwegian)	Number of representatives
Labour Party (Arbeiderpartiet)	9
Conservative Party (Høyre)	5
Christian Democratic Party (Kristelig Folkeparti)	1
Centre Party (Senterpartiet)	4
Socialist Left Party (Sosialistisk Venstreparti)	1
Liberal Party (Venstre)	3
Total number of members:	23

Vikna kommunestyre 1975–1979
Party name (in Norwegian)	Number of representatives
Labour Party (Arbeiderpartiet)	7
Conservative Party (Høyre)	3
Christian Democratic Party (Kristelig Folkeparti)	2
Centre Party (Senterpartiet)	6
Socialist Left Party (Sosialistisk Venstreparti)	2
Liberal Party (Venstre)	3
Total number of members:	23

Vikna kommunestyre 1971–1975
Party name (in Norwegian)	Number of representatives
Labour Party (Arbeiderpartiet)	10
Conservative Party (Høyre)	2
Christian Democratic Party (Kristelig Folkeparti)	1
Centre Party (Senterpartiet)	7
Liberal Party (Venstre)	3
Total number of members:	23

Vikna kommunestyre 1967–1971
Party name (in Norwegian)	Number of representatives
Labour Party (Arbeiderpartiet)	10
Conservative Party (Høyre)	1
Christian Democratic Party (Kristelig Folkeparti)	1
Centre Party (Senterpartiet)	6
Liberal Party (Venstre)	5
Total number of members:	23

Vikna kommunestyre 1963–1967
Party name (in Norwegian)	Number of representatives
Labour Party (Arbeiderpartiet)	12
Conservative Party (Høyre)	2
Christian Democratic Party (Kristelig Folkeparti)	1
Centre Party (Senterpartiet)	4
Liberal Party (Venstre)	4
Total number of members:	23

Vikna herredsstyre 1959–1963
Party name (in Norwegian)	Number of representatives
Labour Party (Arbeiderpartiet)	10
Conservative Party (Høyre)	1
Christian Democratic Party (Kristelig Folkeparti)	1
Centre Party (Senterpartiet)	5
Liberal Party (Venstre)	6
Total number of members:	23

Vikna herredsstyre 1955–1959
Party name (in Norwegian)	Number of representatives
Labour Party (Arbeiderpartiet)	10
Conservative Party (Høyre)	1
Christian Democratic Party (Kristelig Folkeparti)	1
Farmers' Party (Bondepartiet)	5
Liberal Party (Venstre)	4
Local List(s) (Lokale lister)	2
Total number of members:	23

Vikna herredsstyre 1951–1955
Party name (in Norwegian)	Number of representatives
Labour Party (Arbeiderpartiet)	8
Conservative Party (Høyre)	1
Farmers' Party (Bondepartiet)	4
Liberal Party (Venstre)	7
Total number of members:	20

Vikna herredsstyre 1947–1951
Party name (in Norwegian)	Number of representatives
Labour Party (Arbeiderpartiet)	6
Conservative Party (Høyre)	1
Communist Party (Kommunistiske Parti)	1
Farmers' Party (Bondepartiet)	4
Liberal Party (Venstre)	8
Total number of members:	20

Vikna herredsstyre 1945–1947
Party name (in Norwegian)	Number of representatives
Labour Party (Arbeiderpartiet)	9
Conservative Party (Høyre)	1
Communist Party (Kommunistiske Parti)	1
Farmers' Party (Bondepartiet)	3
Liberal Party (Venstre)	6
Total number of members:	20

Vikna herredsstyre 1937–1941*
Party name (in Norwegian)	Number of representatives
Labour Party (Arbeiderpartiet)	8
Farmers' Party (Bondepartiet)	3
Liberal Party (Venstre)	7
Joint List(s) of Non-Socialist Parties (Borgerlige Felleslister)	2
Total number of members:	20
Note: Due to the German occupation of Norway during World War II, no elections were held for new municipal councils until after the war ended in 1945.

=== Mayors ===
The mayor (Norwegian: ordfører) of Vikna Municipality was the political leader of the municipality and the chairperson of the municipal council. Here is a list of people who held this position:

- 1869–1875: Iver Kirkeby
- 1876–1877: Arnold Bugge
- 1878–1881: Benjamin Gjestsen
- 1882–1898: Kasper Sund (V)
- 1899–1901: Christoffer Inderberg (V)
- 1902–1904: Knut Rangsæter (V)
- 1905–1922: Christoffer Inderberg (V)
- 1923–1928: Christian Ulsund (Bp)
- 1929–1942: Ingvar Inderberg (V)
- 1942–1943: T.B. Norberg (NS)
- 1943–1945: Fredrik C. Hansen (NS)
- 1945–1945: Ingvar Inderberg (V)
- 1946–1947: Arthur Prestvik (Ap)
- 1948–1951: Leon Brevik (V)
- 1952–1955: Fredrik Lie-Gjeseth (Bp)
- 1956–1975: Lars Kirkeby-Garstad (Bp)
- 1976–1979: Arne Hansen (V)
- 1980–1983: Roald Kirkeby-Garstad (Sp)
- 1984–1991: Magnus Kleven (Ap)
- 1992–1997: Lars Peder Brekk (Sp)
- 1997–2003: Else Hansvik Storsul (H)
- 2003–2011: Karin Søraunet (KrF)
- 2011–2015: Reinert Eidshaug (Ap)
- 2015–2019: Amund Hellesø (Ap)

== Economy ==
Fishing, fish farming, public services, and agriculture are the main sources of income. The Norveg museum, devoted to the coastal way of life through the centuries, is located in Rørvik. The Vikna Wind Farm is located on Mellom-Vikna, just west of Garstad, and it produces power for much of the municipality.

== Transportation ==
Hurtigruten boats stop frequently at Rørvik and Norwegian County Road 770 via the Nærøysund Bridge connects Vikna to the mainland and European route E6. There is also the small Rørvik Airport, Ryum, just south of Rørvik. Vikna and neighbouring Nærøy Municipality formed a common work area with nearly 10,000 inhabitants.

== See also ==
- List of former municipalities of Norway
