= Vikna =

Vikna may refer to:

== Places ==
- Vikna Municipality, a former municipality in Trøndelag county, Norway
- Vikna archipelago, including the main islands of Inner-Vikna, Mellom-Vikna, and Ytter-Vikna
- Vikna Wind Farm, a former wind farm in Trøndelag county, Norway
