= Nordøyan =

Island in Trøndelag, Norway

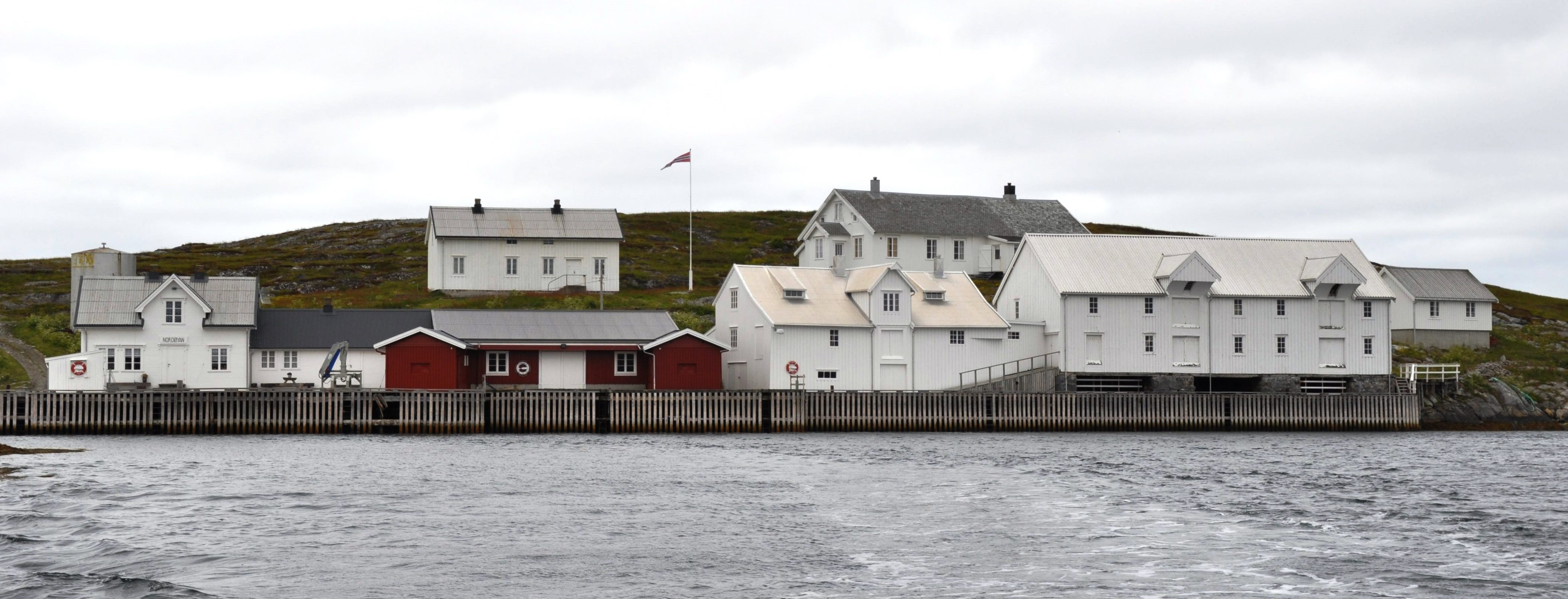
- Nordøyan in June 2014
- Interactive map of Nordøyan

Geography
- Location: Trøndelag, Norway
- Coordinates: 64.80456°N 10.54336°E

Administration
- Norway
- County: Trøndelag
- Municipality: Nærøysund Municipality

Demographics
- Population: 0

Nordøyan is an archipelago and abandoned fishing village in Nærøysund Municipality in Trøndelag county, Norway. The island group is located at the western end of the Folda fjord, about 10 kilometres (6.2 mi) to the southwest of the island of Ytter-Vikna and about 13 kilometres (8.1 mi) to the northwest of the Sør-Gjæslingan islands. Nordøyan has been the site of a fishing village dating back to the 16th century, but since 1919, has not had any permanent residents. The homes on Nordøyan are now mostly used as holiday cottages.

== History ==
The oldest record of activity on the islands dates to 1597 when it was mentioned in records as one of the six fishing villages in the prestegjeld of Nærøy. During the 19th century, many rorbu were built in Nordøyan. In 1893, a pier was constructed.

The harbor was improved from 1890–1920 through the construction of breakwaters between several of the islands. Nordøyan Lighthouse is located on the islet of Surnøya, having been built there in 1890.

By the turn of the 20th century, motorized boats were beginning to be seen in the area. Motor powered boats quickly gained ground, and in a statistical overview from 1911, about 58% of the fishing fleet in Namdalen was motorized. This change meant that fisherman could live further away from the fishing grounds and little, remote island fishing villages were less needed. Nordøyan no longer had any permanent residents by 1919.

On 21 October 1962, the MS Sanct Svithun ran aground at Nordøyan lighthouse and 41 people died, in an event known as the Sinking of the Sanct Svithun.

== Geography ==
The village consists of three large islets: Heimværet, Oddholmen, Surnøya, along with several smaller islets. The area consisted of bare bedrock and partly peat-covered rock. Vegetation is limited to grass and heather. There are remains of a road from the quarry to the quay in connection with the construction of the breakwaters; this has now been converted into fish racks for drying fish, and the "road" is used for transporting fish.

== See also ==
- List of islands of Norway
