= Borgan =

Borgan may refer to:

== People ==
- Ole Hermann Borgan (born 1965), Norwegian football assistant referee
- Geir Borgan Paulsen (born 1957), Norwegian weightlifter and bodybuilder

== Places ==
- Borgan, Iran, a city and capital of Qasr-e Qand County, in Sistan and Baluchestan Province, Iran
- Borgan, Norway, an island in the Vikna archipelago in Trøndelag county, Norway
