= Austafjord =

Village in Nærøysund Municipality, Norway

- Village
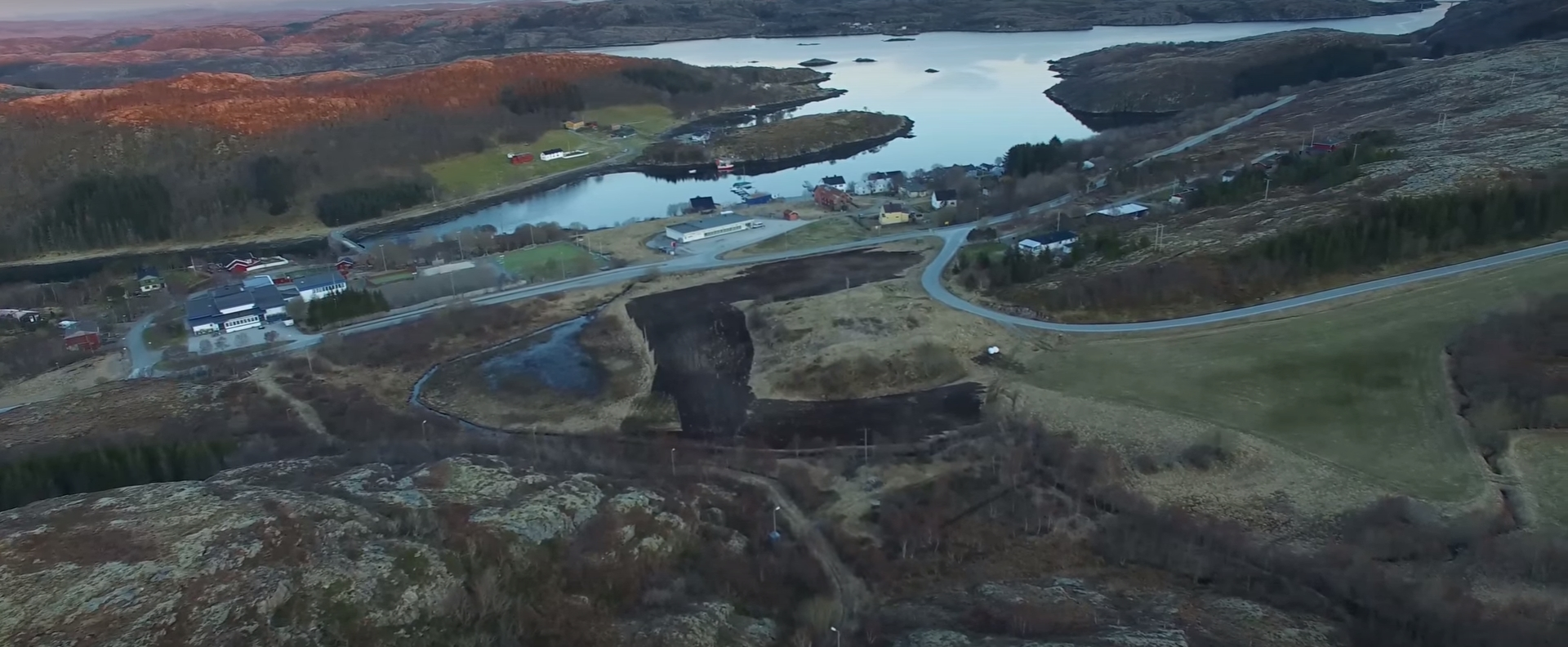
- View of the village
- Interactive map of Austafjord
- Location within Trøndelag Location within Norway
- Coordinates: 64.9171°N 10.9396°E
- Country: Norway
- Region: Central Norway
- County: Trøndelag
- District: Namdalen
- Municipality: Nærøysund Municipality
- Elevation: 19 m (62 ft)
- Time zone: UTC+01:00 (CET)
  - Summer (DST): UTC+02:00 (CEST)
- Post Code: 7900 Rørvik

Austafjord is a small village in Nærøysund Municipality in Trøndelag county, Norway. It is located on the island of Ytter-Vikna, approximately 30 kilometres (19 mi) west of the municipal center, Rørvik. Austafjord sits about half-way between the nearby villages of Garstad and Valøya. Austafjord has a population of about 60, as well as a shop, a post office, a school, and a day-care center. Austafjord is the western terminus of Norwegian County Road 770.
