= Sør-Gjæslingan =

Archipelago in Trøndelag, Norway

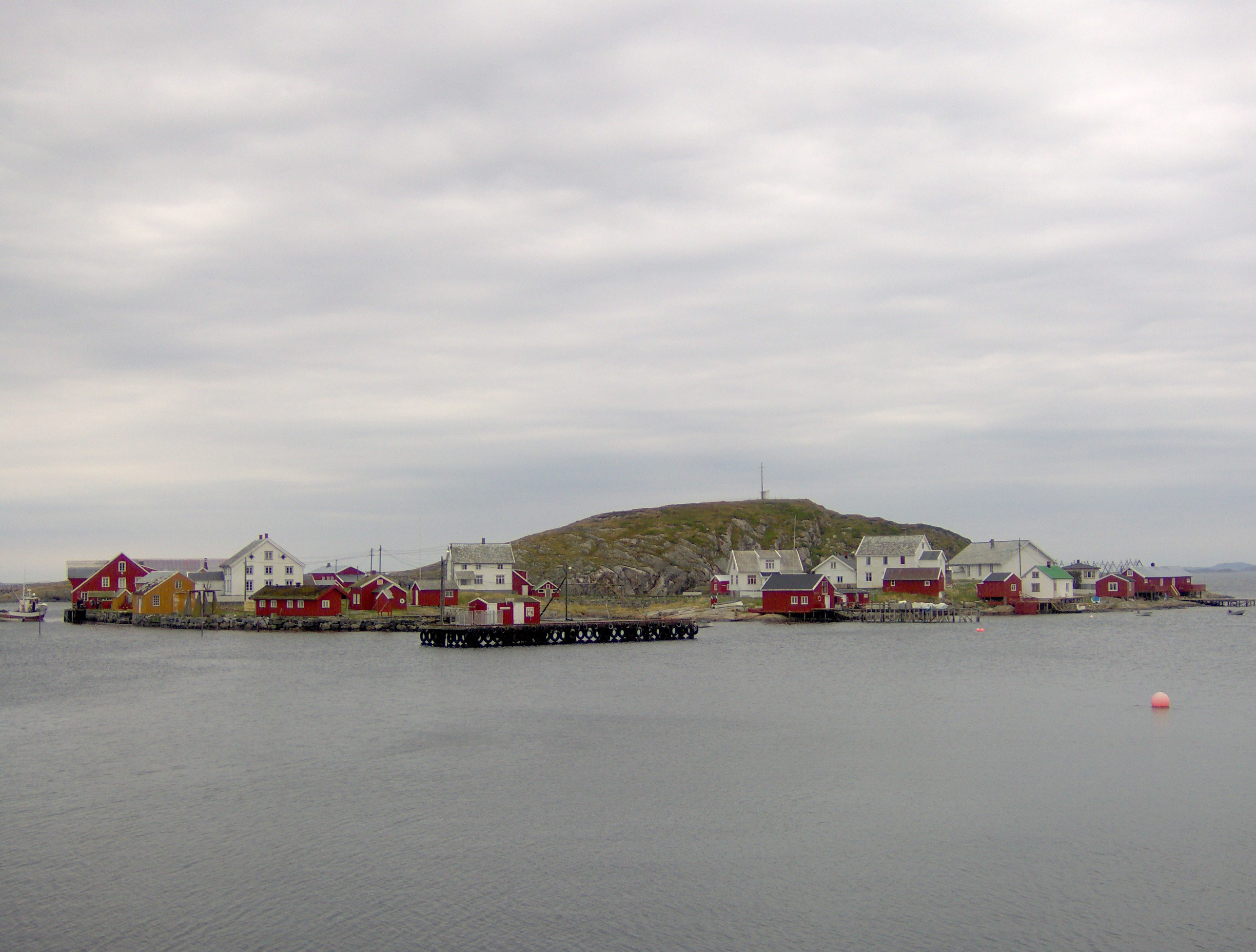
- Heimværet, the largest island of Sør-Gjæslingan
- Interactive map of Sør-Gjæslingan

Geography
- Location: Trøndelag, Norway
- Coordinates: 64.74036°N 10.77193°E

Administration
- Norway
- County: Trøndelag
- Municipality: Nærøysund Municipality

Sør-Gjæslingan is an archipelago in Nærøysund Municipality in Trøndelag county, Norway. The island group is located in at the entrance to the Folda fjord, about 25 kilometres (16 mi) to the southwest of the town of Rørvik and about 13 kilometres (8.1 mi) to the southeast of the Nordøyan islands.

Sør-Gjæslingan includes about 80 small islands, islets, and skerries. The largest of which are Heimværet, Flatholmen, Kalholmen, Nakken, Sæternesholmen, Sørenskjær, Lyngnesholmen, Store Langøy, and Lille Langøy. The Gjæslingan Lighthouse is located on the small islet of Haraldsøykråka.

== History ==
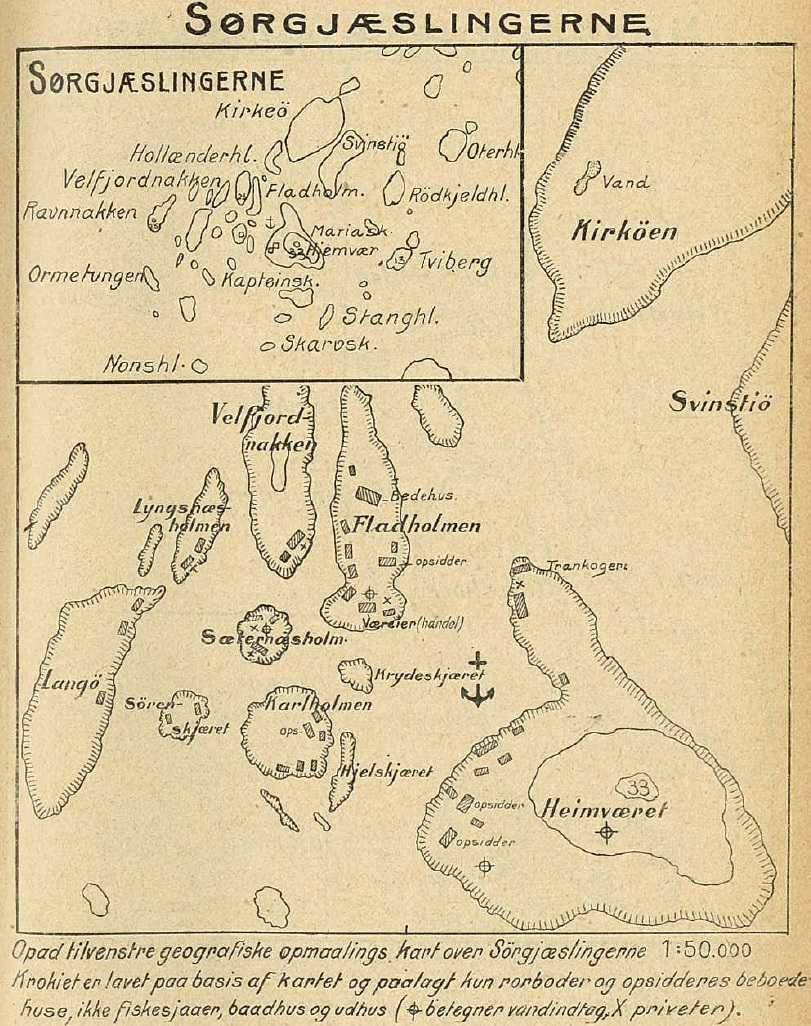
Map of Sør-Gjæslingan settlements in 1902

Sør-Gjæslingan was previously the largest fishing village on the Namdalen coast during the cod fishing season. The fishing village has now been abandoned since the 1970s. The fishing village is now protected and is under the jurisdiction of the museum Museet Midt. The site has a memorial stone to fishermen who died in storms while fishing: 210 fishermen in 1625 and 31 in 1906.

Sør-Gjæslingan was known as a major fishing village many centuries ago. Stone Age finds in the area may indicate that the village was settled very early. Although there were few settlers on Sør-Gjæslingan until the 1900s, the village often housed as many as 400 boats. From the turn of the century, many more permanent residents came to the village, mainly fishermen who bought rorbu cabins or built houses to settle there. At their peak, up to 1,200 fishing boats with about 5,000 men and 150 merchant vessels could be gathered on the village.

The fishing village was at the mercy of the variations in the influx of fish, and these variations affected the settlement in the fishing village. In the period from 1855–1935, 99 fishermen's huts were built on the bay, and the building activity coincided closely with years when there were large influxes of cod. The heyday of the village was between 1908 and 1913, and up to two million cod could be caught in a season. During this period, there were about 4,000 fishermen on Sør-Gjæslingan each year.

The last great year for good fishing on Sør-Gjæslingan was 1931. After that, the influx of cod decreased, and led to almost no new fishermen's huts being built. In addition, several of the fishermen now had access to deck boats that made it possible to spend the night on board. The last housing construction on Sør-Gjæslingan took place during the Second World War.

From World War II until the 1970s, the cod fishing at Gjæslingan was poor. Although the fishing was poor, the village received electricity from the mainland in 1969. This significant investment was made because the municipality and the permanent residents considered the fishing village to be a viable community. The village had modernized, with a post office, shop, school, fish factory, and regular ferry connections to the mainland. However, like other island communities along the coast, Sør-Gjæslingan was a victim of the centralization tendencies that were increasing in society at the time.

Sør-Gjæslingan got its last owner in 1969, Petter Kjøllberg. The decline in the population had been surprisingly small up to that point, and Vikna Municipality was very interested in the continuation of the fishing industry at Sør-Gjæslingan. The municipality provided financial guarantees, and the owner received support from the District Development Fund. Despite this, during the 1970s, the entire island community dissolved. In 1978, the owner went bankrupt, and the following year, Namsos Trafikkselskap closed down the regular boat route to the fishing village.

== See also ==
- List of islands of Norway
