= Rørvik Church =

Church in Trøndelag, Norway

- Rørvik kirke
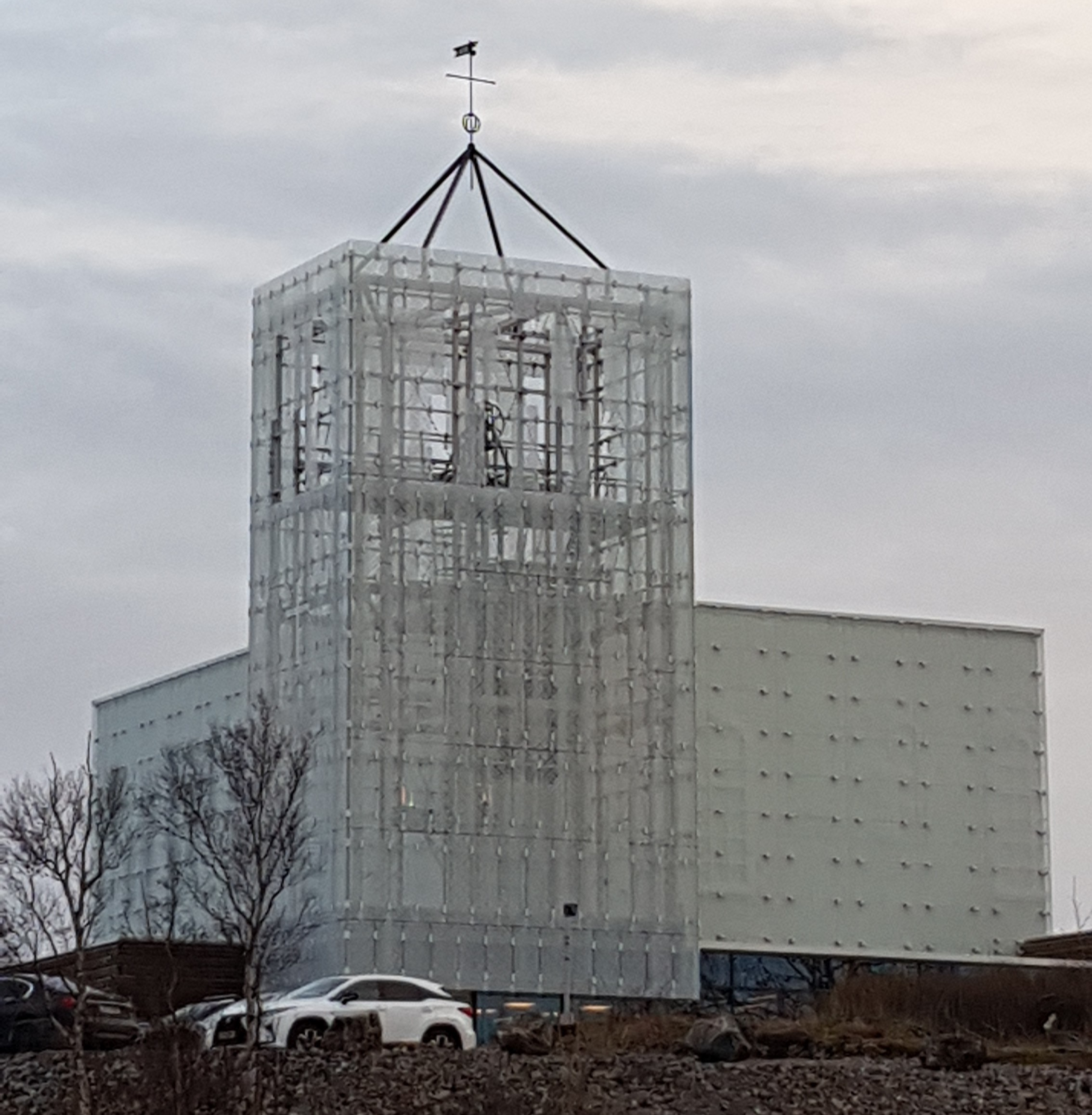
- View of the church
- Rørvik Church
- 64.86234777°N 11.233971655°E
- Location: Nærøysund Municipality, Trøndelag
- Country: Norway
- Denomination: Church of Norway
- Churchmanship: Evangelical Lutheran

History
- Status: Parish church
- Founded: 1896
- Consecrated: 22 Dec 2019

Architecture
- Functional status: Active
- Architect: Ogmund Sørli
- Architectural type: Long church
- Completed: 2019 (7 years ago)

Specifications
- Capacity: 250
- Materials: Concrete and glass

Administration
- Diocese: Nidaros bispedømme
- Deanery: Namdal prosti
- Parish: Vikna
- Norwegian Cultural Heritage Site
- Type: Church
- Status: Automatically protected
- ID: 85342

Rørvik Church (Norwegian: Rørvik kirke) is a parish church of the Church of Norway in Nærøysund Municipality in Trøndelag county, Norway. It is located in the town of Rørvik on the island of Inner-Vikna. It was one of the churches for the Vikna parish which is part of the Namdal prosti (deanery) in the Diocese of Nidaros. The modern, concrete and glass church was built in a long church design in 2019 using plans drawn up by the architect Ogmund Sørli. The church seats about 250 people, but can be expanded up to about 400 people.

== History ==
The first church in Rørvik was built in 1896 after the people of the village of Rørvik asked for a church in their village since the nearest church, Garstad Church, was a 20-kilometre (12 mi) long boat trip away. The government agreed and it was built. The new church was consecrated on 27 October 1896 by Bishop Johannes Skaar. The white, wooden church was built in a long church style in 1896 by the architects Ole Scheistrøen and Arne Sjølvik. The church seated about 200 people.

On 1 May 1940, during World War II, a bomb was dropped on the hill between the church and the road Johan Bergs gate. The church was so badly damaged that it could not be used without a thorough repair. The church was then rebuilt, but to save money and time, a somewhat simpler design was chosen rather than replicating the original. It was restored in 1973 and 2006–2007.

On 18 February 2013, the church was damaged by fire, but survived. The altarpiece was brought to safety during the firefighting. It is likely that the fire was started by two children who were playing with matches. The fire was declared accidental. After removing the silver and remaining historic pieces, the church was demolished in preparation for construction of a new church building.

After a long design and fundraising period, construction on the new church began in October 2018. The new glass and concrete building was completed in 2019 and it was consecrate on 22 December 2019 by the Bishop Herborg Finnset.

== Media gallery ==
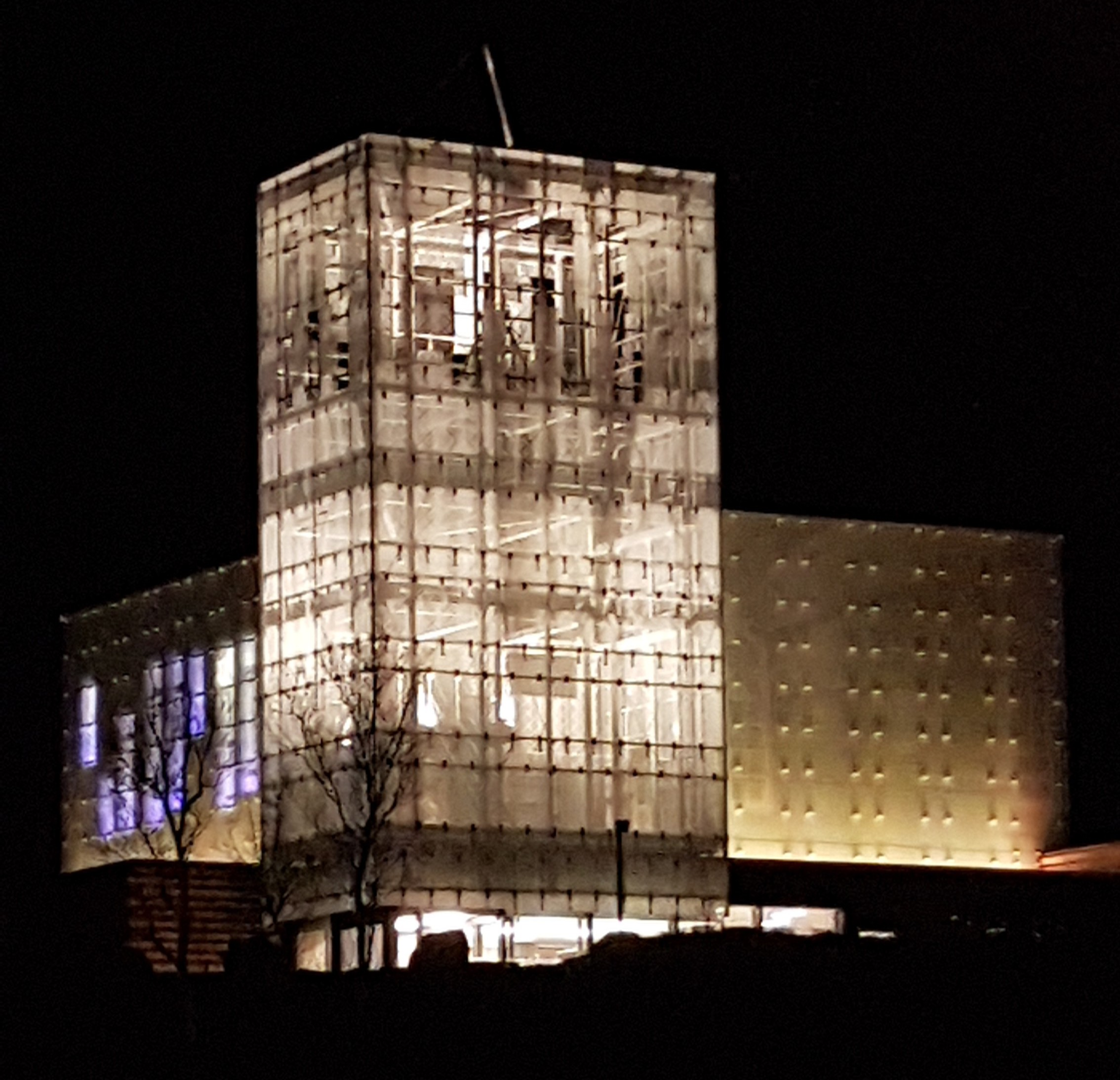

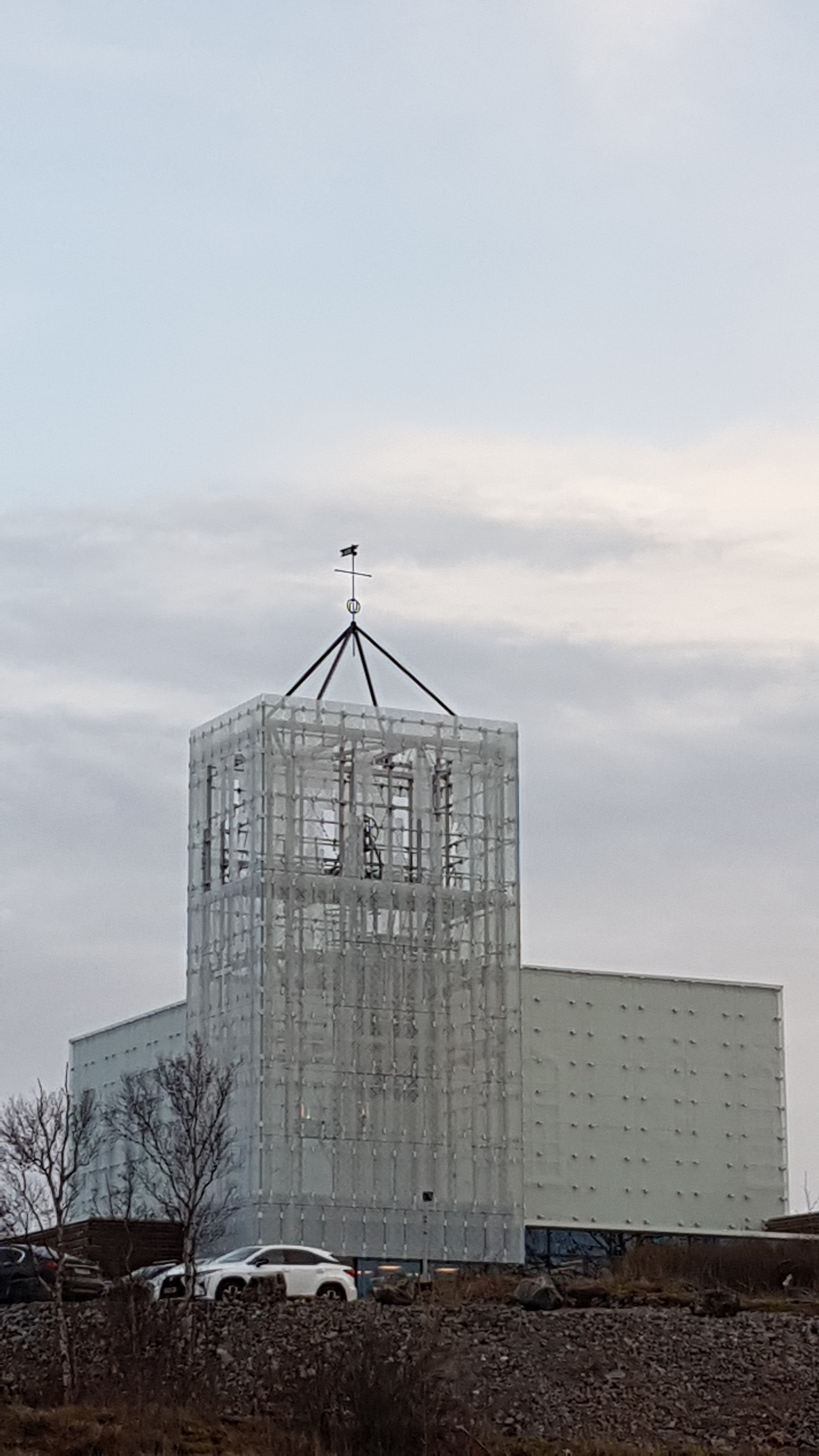

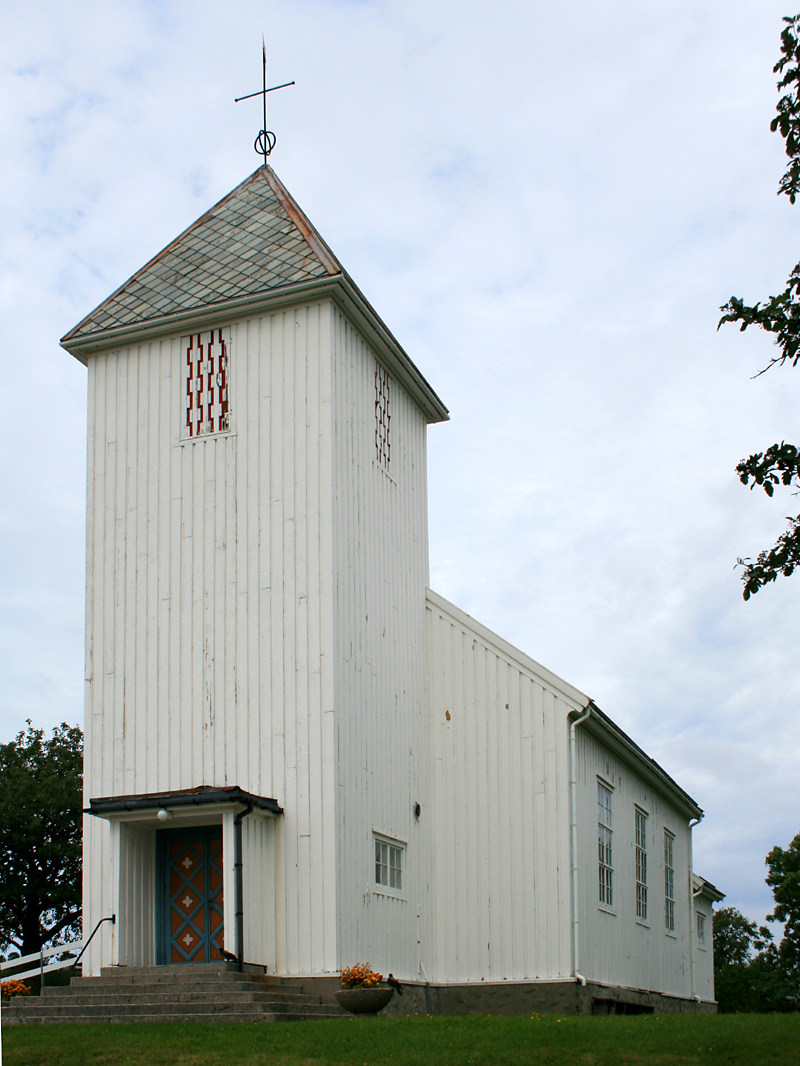
Old church (1896–2012)

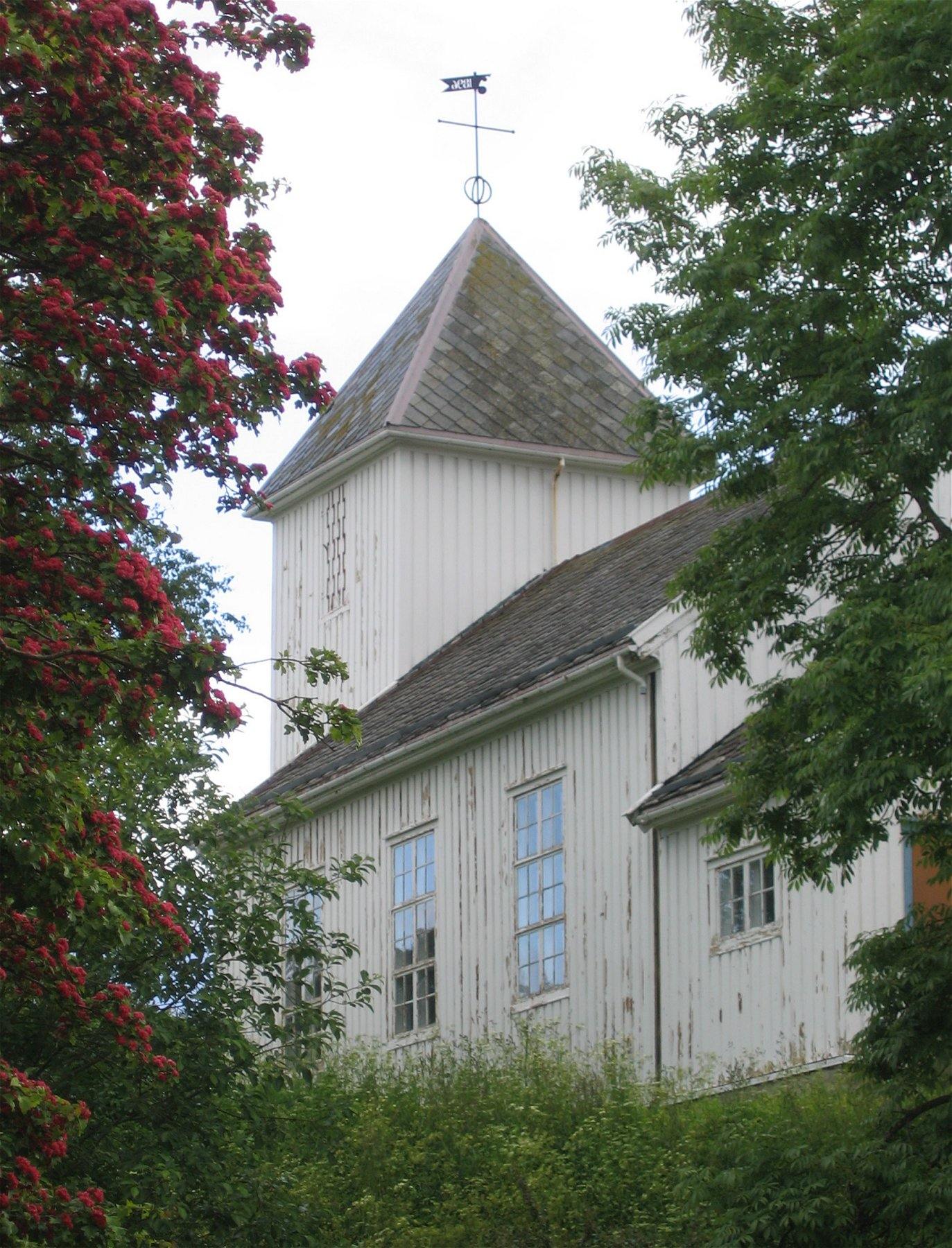
Old church (1896–2012)

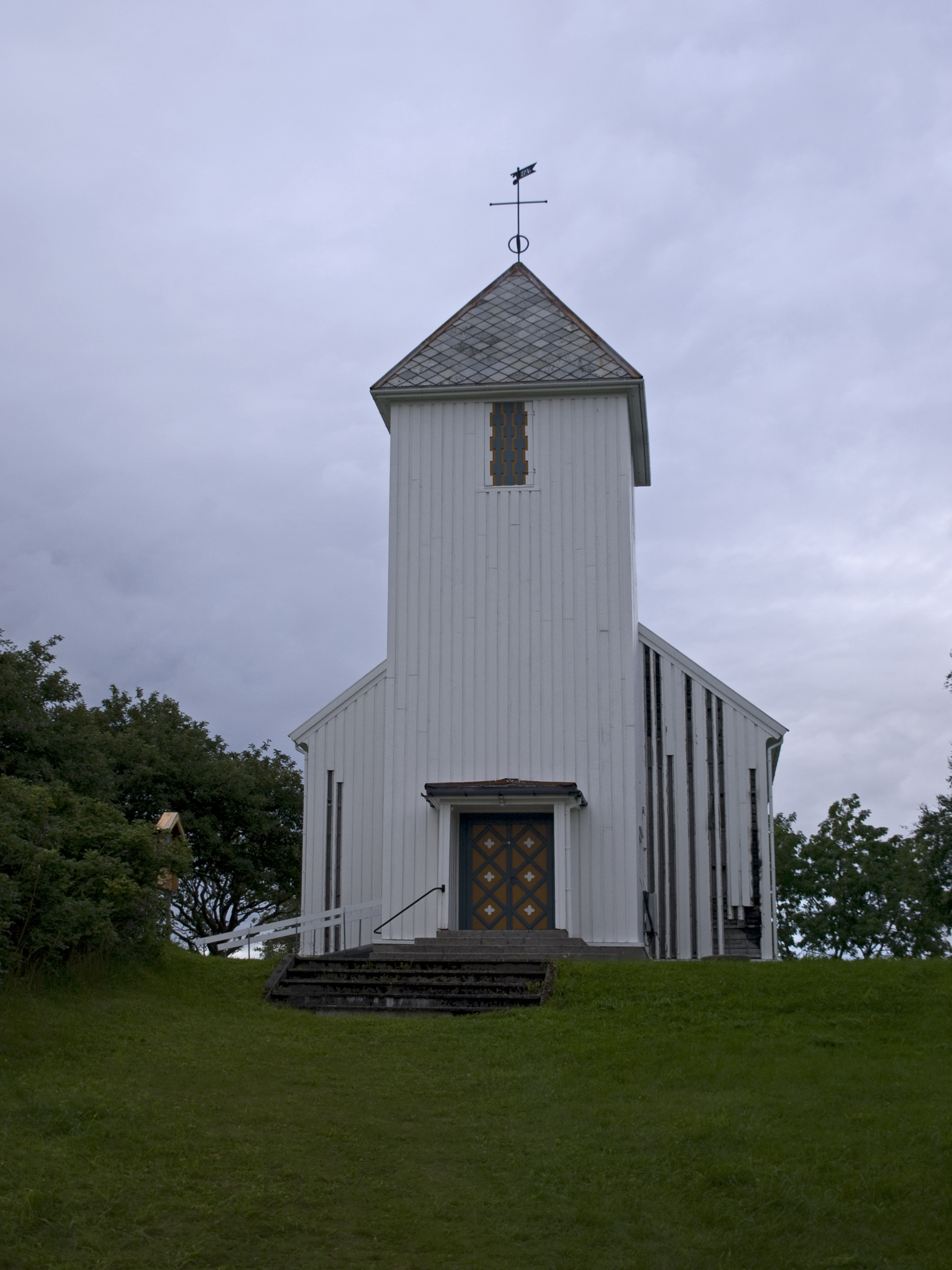
Rørvik Church in August 2013. The fire damage is visible.

== See also ==
- List of churches in Nidaros
