= Valøy Chapel =

Church in Trøndelag, Norway

- Valøy kapell
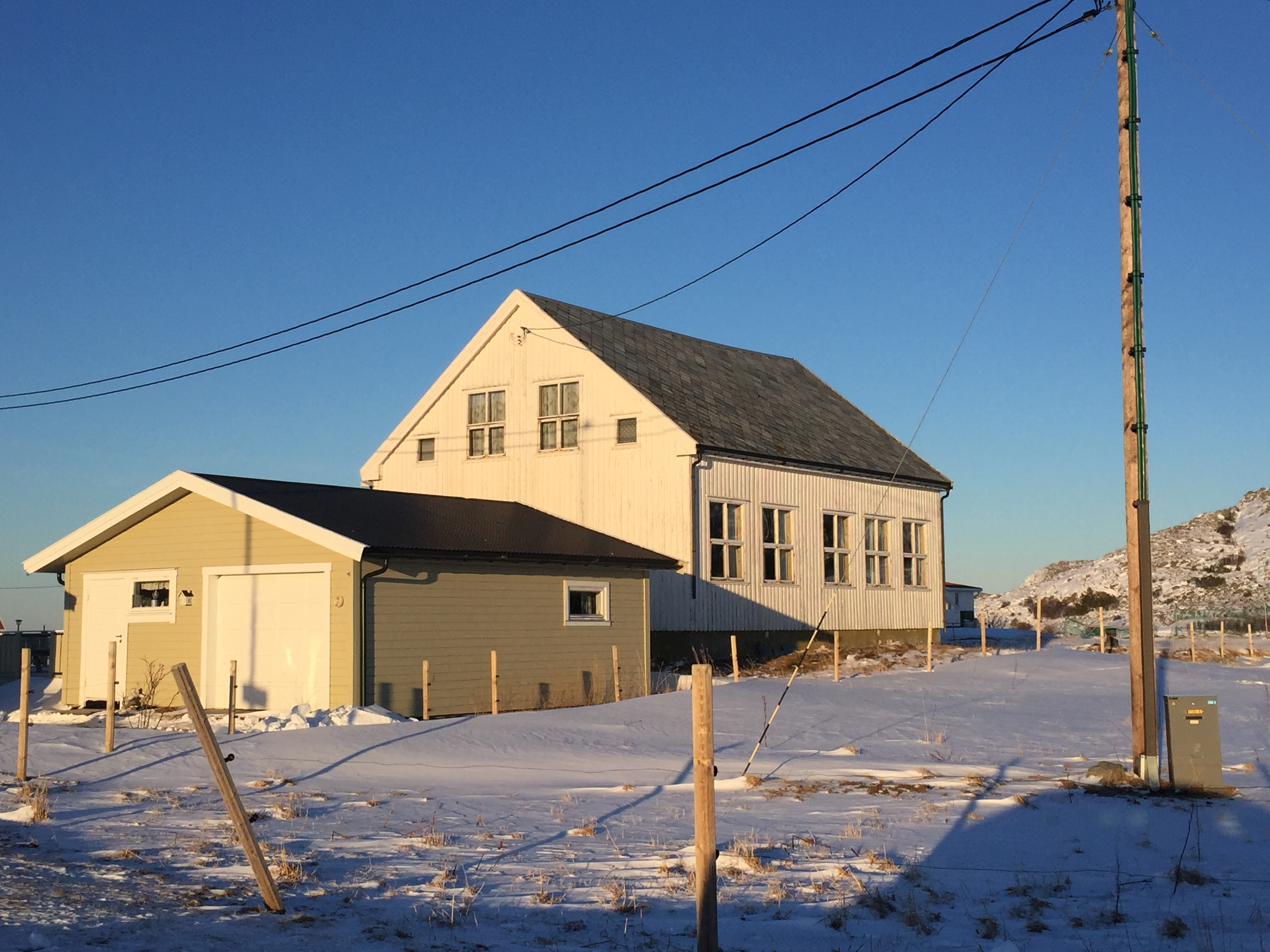
- View of the chapel
- Valøy Chapel
- 64.910833°N 10.782778°E
- Location: Nærøysund Municipality, Trøndelag
- Country: Norway
- Denomination: Church of Norway
- Churchmanship: Evangelical Lutheran

History
- Status: Chapel
- Founded: 1972
- Consecrated: 20 Aug 1972

Architecture
- Functional status: Active
- Architectural type: Long church
- Completed: 1972 (54 years ago)

Specifications
- Capacity: 150
- Materials: Wood

Administration
- Diocese: Nidaros bispedømme
- Deanery: Namdal prosti
- Parish: Vikna
- Norwegian Cultural Heritage Site
- Type: Church
- Status: Not protected
- ID: 85756

Valøy Church (Norwegian: Valøy kapell) is a chapel of the Church of Norway in Nærøysund Municipality in Trøndelag county, Norway. It is located in the village of Valøya on the western coast of the island of Ytter-Vikna. It is an annex chapel for the Vikna parish which is part of the Namdal prosti (deanery) in the Diocese of Nidaros. The wooden chapel building is a former school building in Valøya. It was converted to a chapel in 1972 and the building was consecrated on 20 August 1972 by Bishop Tord Godal. The church seats about 150 people.

== See also ==
- List of churches in Nidaros
