= Nordøyan Lighthouse =

Lighthouse in Norway

Nordøyan Lighthouse Nordøyan fyrstasjon
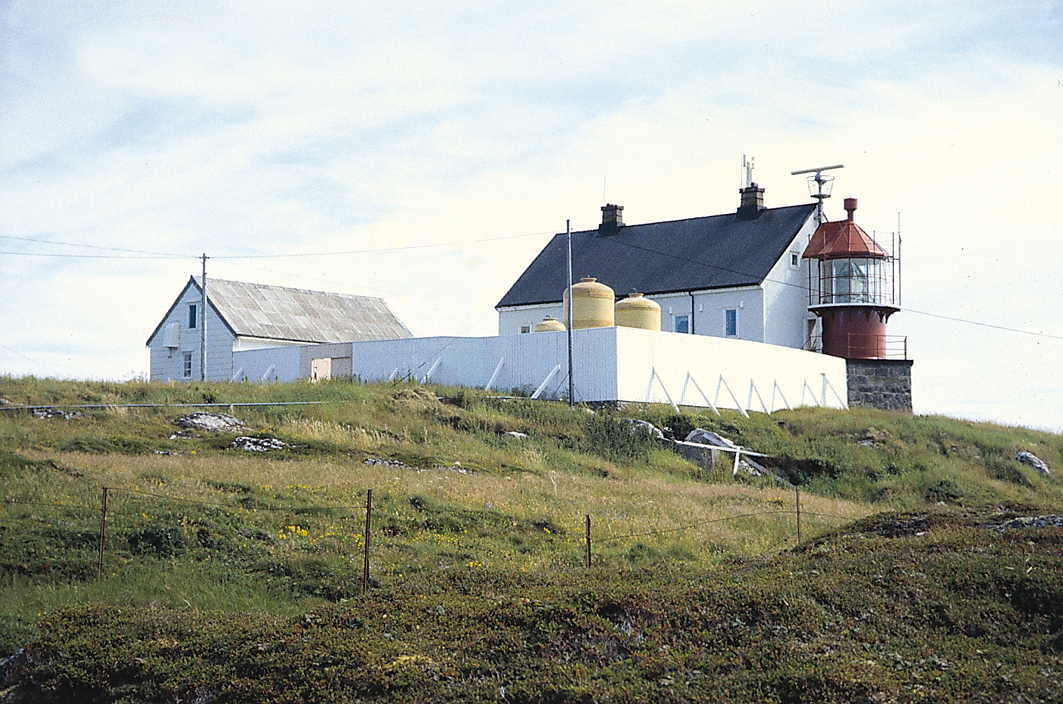
- View of the lighthouse
- Location: Trøndelag, Norway
- Coordinates: 64°47′55″N 10°32′52″E

Tower
- Constructed: 1890
- Foundation: Stone
- Construction: Cast iron tower
- Automated: 1989
- Height: 10 metres (33 ft)
- Shape: Cylindrical tower
- Markings: Red tower
- Heritage: cultural property

Light
- Focal height: 36.5 metres (120 ft)
- Intensity: 2,070,000 candela
- Range: 17.2 nmi (31.9 km; 19.8 mi)
- Characteristic: F FL W 40s
- Norway no.: 533500

Nordøyan Lighthouse (Norwegian: Nordøyan fyr) is a coastal lighthouse in Nærøysund Municipality in Trøndelag, Norway. It was established in 1890 and automated in 1989. The light is powered on all year except from May 12 until July 25 due to the midnight sun in this region.

Nordøyan Lighthouse stands on the islet of Surenøy in the Nordøyan islands, north of the Foldafjord. The lighthouse tower is 10 metres (33 ft) tall, and the light at the top of the tower is located 36.5 metres (120 ft) above sea level. The white light is always on, emitting a 79,000 candela light, and every 40 seconds it flashes a much brighter 2,070,000 candela light. The light can be seen for about 17.2 nautical miles (31.9 km; 19.8 mi).

== Climate ==
Climate data for Nordøyan Lighthouse 1991-2020 (33 m)
Month	Jan	Feb	Mar	Apr	May	Jun	Jul	Aug	Sep	Oct	Nov	Dec	Year
Mean daily maximum °C (°F)	3.9 (39.0)	3.2 (37.8)	4 (39)	6.6 (43.9)	9.9 (49.8)	13.1 (55.6)	15.6 (60.1)	15.7 (60.3)	13.1 (55.6)	9.1 (48.4)	6.3 (43.3)	4.8 (40.6)	8.8 (47.8)
Daily mean °C (°F)	2.1 (35.8)	1.4 (34.5)	2.3 (36.1)	4.6 (40.3)	7.5 (45.5)	10.4 (50.7)	12.9 (55.2)	13.5 (56.3)	11.4 (52.5)	7.6 (45.7)	4.8 (40.6)	3 (37)	6.8 (44.2)
Mean daily minimum °C (°F)	0.3 (32.5)	−0.3 (31.5)	0.6 (33.1)	2.9 (37.2)	5.7 (42.3)	9 (48)	11.4 (52.5)	12 (54)	9.9 (49.8)	6.2 (43.2)	3 (37)	1.2 (34.2)	5.2 (41.3)
Source: NOAA - WMO averages 91-2020 Norway

== See also ==
- Lighthouses in Norway
- List of lighthouses in Norway
