= Gjæslingan Lighthouse =

Coastal lighthouse in Nærøysund, Norway

Gjæslingan Lighthouse Gjæslingan fyrstasjon
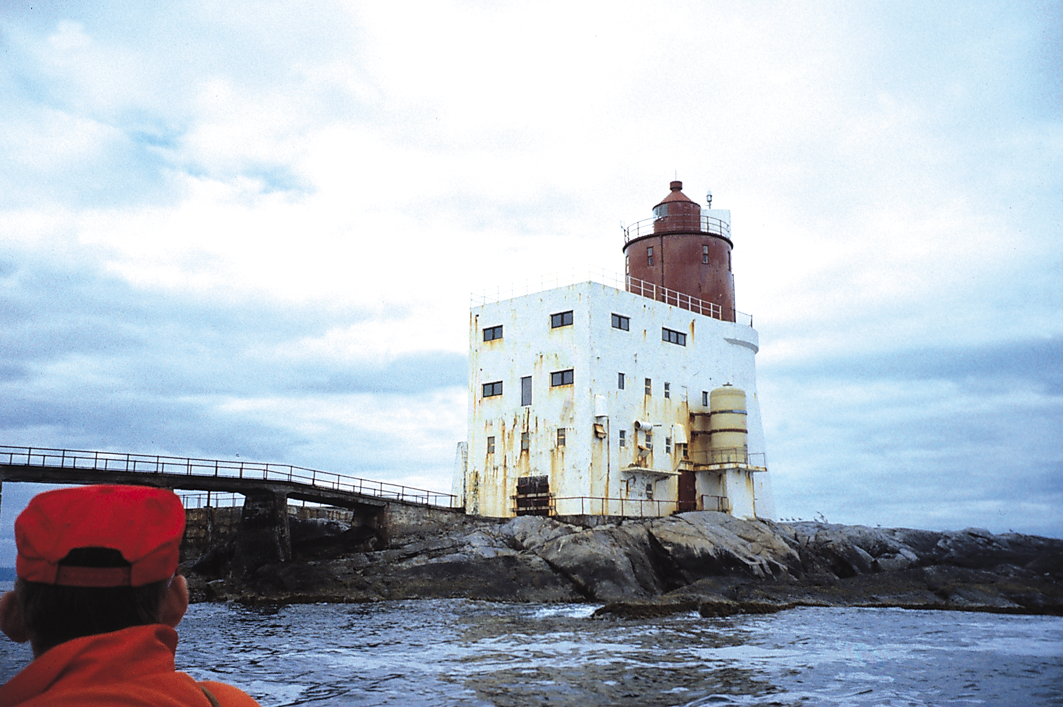
- View of the lighthouse
- Location: Trøndelag, Norway
- Coordinates: 64°43′37″N 10°51′15″E

Tower
- Constructed: 1877
- Foundation: Stone
- Construction: Cast iron
- Automated: 1987
- Height: 24.3 metres (80 ft)
- Shape: Cylindrical tower
- Markings: White with red top
- Racon: G

Light
- Focal height: 23.3 metres (76 ft)
- Range: 14.7 nmi (27.2 km; 16.9 mi)
- Characteristic: Fl W 10s
- Norway no.: 530000

Gjæslingan Lighthouse (Norwegian: Gjæslingan fyr) is a coastal lighthouse in Nærøysund Municipality in Trøndelag, Norway.

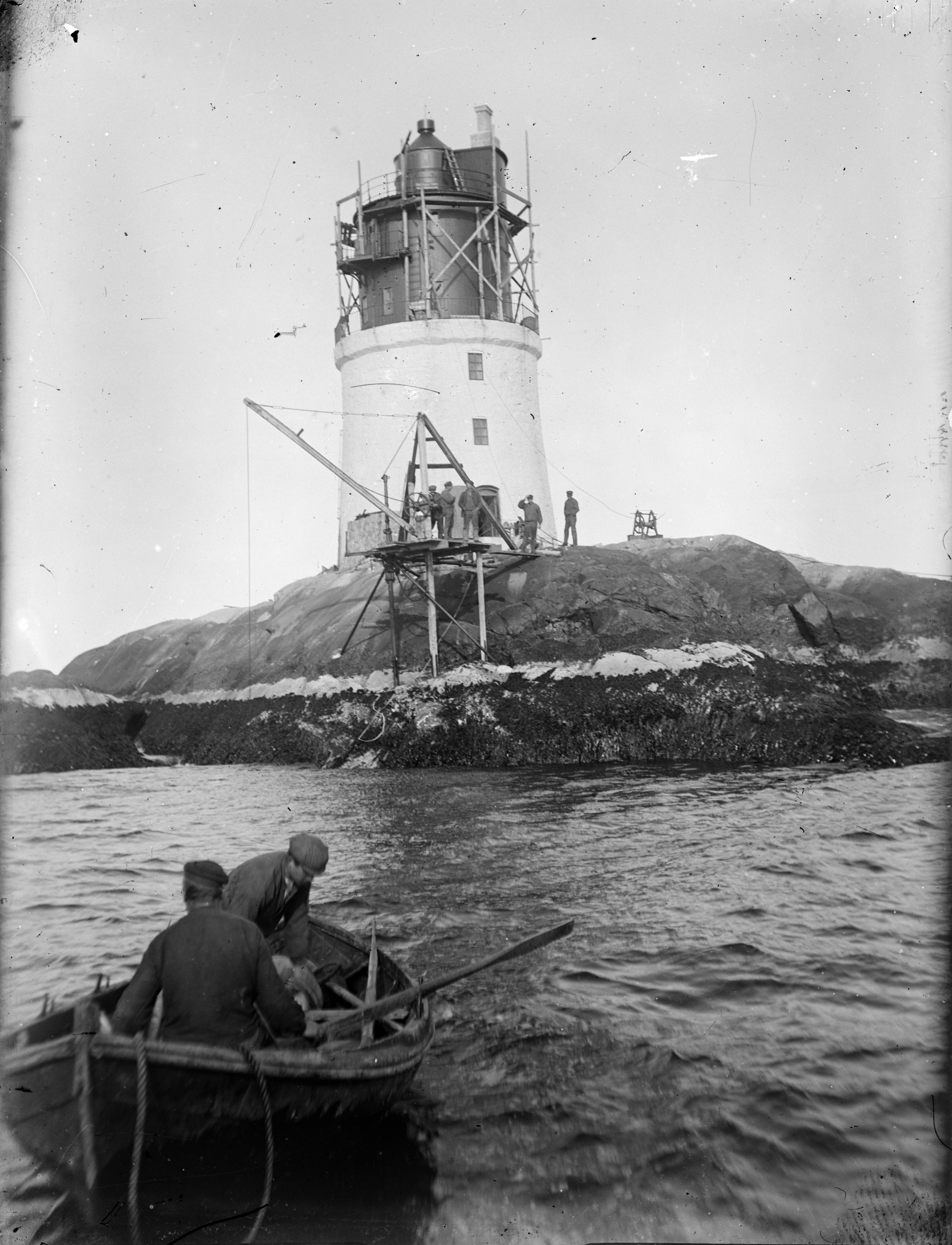
Gjæslingan Lighthouse ca. 1900 – 1910

It was established in 1877, was reinforced in 1961 and automated in 1987.

Gjæslingan lighthouse stands on the Haraldsøykråka islet which is part of the Sør-Gjæslingan island group on the north side of the Foldafjord. The white building consists of a 24.3-metre (80 ft) high red iron tower on a stone base. The white light flashes once every ten seconds, and it can be seen for about 14 nautical miles (26 km; 16 mi). The lighthouse also emits a "G" Racon signal.

== See also ==
- Lighthouses in Norway
- List of lighthouses in Norway
