= Garstad Church =

Church in Trøndelag, Norway

- Garstad kirke
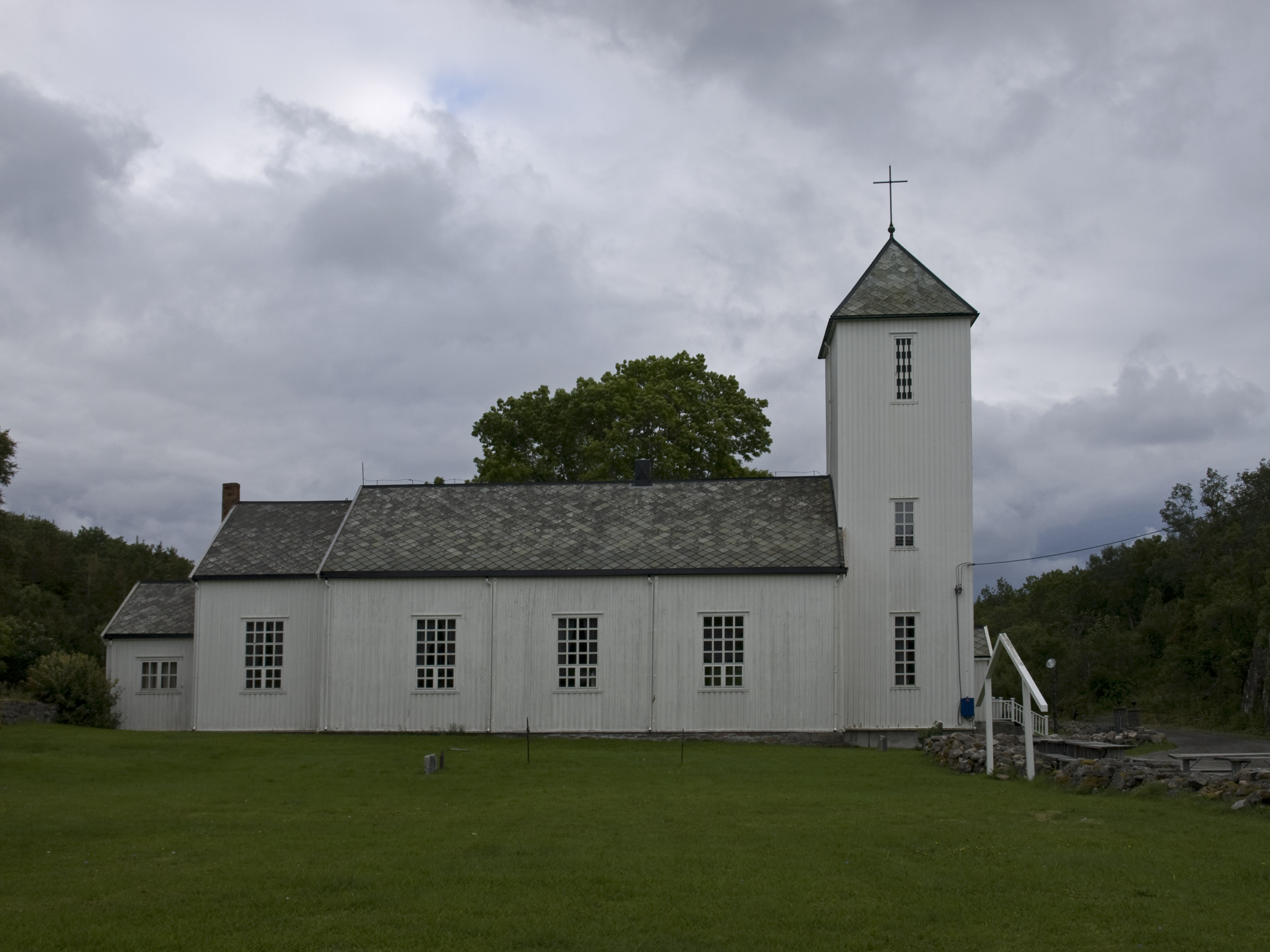
- View of the church
- Garstad Church
- 64.87664272°N 10.96264690°E
- Location: Nærøysund Municipality, Trøndelag
- Country: Norway
- Denomination: Church of Norway
- Churchmanship: Evangelical Lutheran

History
- Former name: Vikna kirke
- Status: Parish church
- Founded: 1592
- Consecrated: 4 July 1856

Architecture
- Functional status: Active
- Architectural type: Long church
- Completed: 1856 (170 years ago)

Specifications
- Capacity: 320
- Materials: Wood

Administration
- Diocese: Nidaros bispedømme
- Deanery: Namdal prosti
- Parish: Vikna
- Norwegian Cultural Heritage Site
- Type: Church
- Status: Not protected
- ID: 85844

Garstad Church (Norwegian: Garstad kirke) is a parish church of the Church of Norway in Nærøysund Municipality in Trøndelag county, Norway. It is located in the village of Garstad on the island of Mellom-Vikna. It is the main church for the Vikna parish which is part of the Namdal prosti (deanery) in the Diocese of Nidaros. The white, wooden church was built in a long church style in 1856. The church seats about 320 people.

== History ==
The first church was built at Garstad on the island of Mellom-Vikna in 1592, being consecrated on 1 November 1592. The church served the Vikna area for over 200 years before it burned to the ground after being struck by lightning on 20 January 1854. Soon after, the church was rebuilt on the same site. The new building was consecrated on 4 July 1856. In the 1950s, the architect Arne Sørvik was hired to lead an extensive restoration of the building prior to its 100th anniversary. The newly updated church was re-consecrated on 16 May 1954. The restoration included new windows, a newly rebuilt tower, and a newly redecorated interior.

== See also ==
- List of churches in Nidaros
