= Borgan, Norway =

Island in Trøndelag, Norway

Borgan
- Interactive map of Borgan

Geography
- Location: Trøndelag, Norway
- Coordinates: 64.9758°N 10.9043°E
- Area: 6.2 km^{2} (2.4 sq mi)
- Length: 5 km (3.1 mi)
- Width: 2 km (1.2 mi)
- Highest elevation: 89 m (292 ft)
- Highest point: Trollskardstindan

Administration
- Norway
- County: Trøndelag
- Municipality: Nærøysund Municipality

Borgan is an island in Nærøysund Municipality in Trøndelag county, Norway. The 6.2-square-kilometre (2.4 sq mi) island lies about 3 kilometres (1.9 mi) north of the larger island of Ytter-Vikna and the island of Kalvøya lies immediately north of Borgan.

Borgan is not accessible by road, but there is a ferry connection to Ramstadlandet on Ytter-Vikna. Most of the island's residents live on the south side of the island. The highest point on the island is the 89-metre (292 ft) tall Trollskardstindan.

== See also ==
- List of islands of Norway
