= Garstad =

Village in Nærøysund Municipality, Norway

- Village
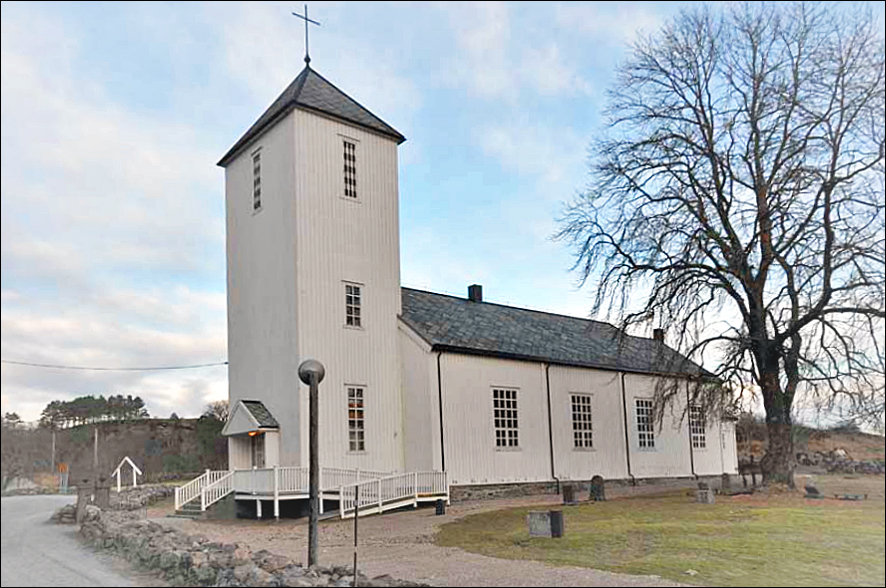
- View of the village
- Interactive map of Garstad
- Location within Trøndelag Location within Norway
- Coordinates: 64.8803°N 10.9542°E
- Country: Norway
- Region: Central Norway
- County: Trøndelag
- District: Namdalen
- Municipality: Nærøysund Municipality
- Elevation: 13 m (43 ft)
- Time zone: UTC+01:00 (CET)
  - Summer (DST): UTC+02:00 (CEST)
- Post Code: 7900 Rørvik

Garstad is a village in Nærøysund Municipality in Trøndelag county, Norway. It is located on the island of Mellom-Vikna, about 25 kilometres (16 mi) west of the municipal centre, Rørvik. Garstad Church is located in this village. Just to the west of the village lies the Vikna Wind Farm.
