= Valøya =

Village in Nærøysund Municipality, Norway

- Village
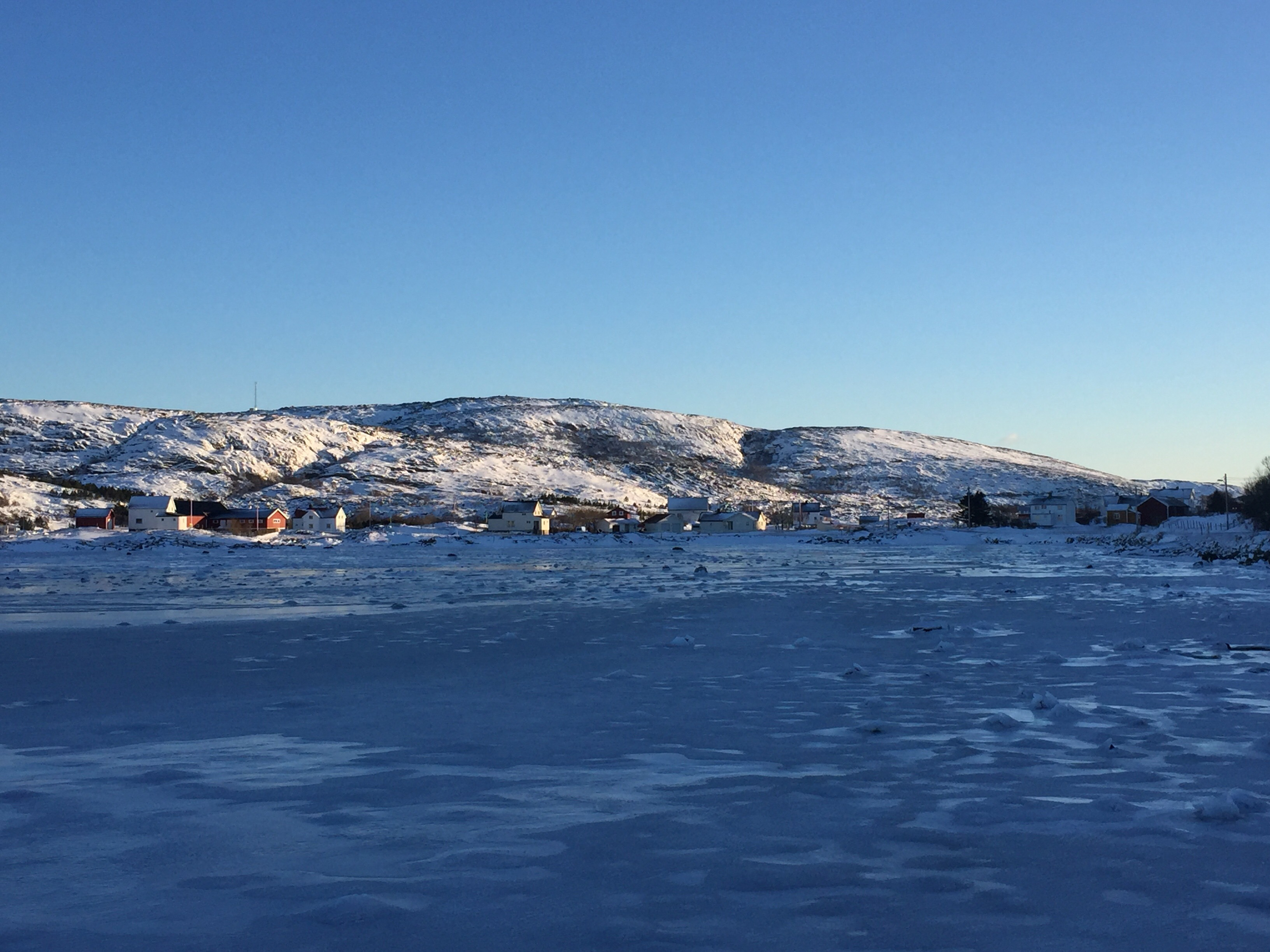
- View of the village
- Interactive map of Valøya
- Location within Trøndelag Location within Norway
- Coordinates: 64.9089°N 10.7842°E
- Country: Norway
- Region: Central Norway
- County: Trøndelag
- District: Namdalen
- Municipality: Nærøysund Municipality
- Elevation: 6 m (20 ft)
- Time zone: UTC+01:00 (CET)
  - Summer (DST): UTC+02:00 (CEST)
- Post Code: 7900 Rørvik

Valøya is a village in Nærøysund Municipality in Trøndelag county, Norway. It is located on the western edge of the island of Ytter-Vikna, about 40 kilometres (25 mi) west of the municipal centre, Rørvik. Valøy Chapel is located in this village.
