= Vikna Wind Farm =

Wind farm in Trøndelag, Norway

- Official name: Vikna vindmøllepark
- Country: Norway
- Location: Nærøysund Municipality
- Coordinates: 64°52′48″N 10°56′47″E
- Status: Decommissioned
- Commission date: 1991
- Decommission date: 2015
- Owner: Nord-Trøndelag Elektrisitetsverk

Wind farm
- Type: Onshore
- Rated wind speed: 5 to 25 m/s (16 to 82 ft/s)

Power generation
- Units decommissioned: 5
- Nameplate capacity: 2.2 MW
- Capacity factor: 30.1%
- Annual net output: 5.8 GW·h

Vikna Wind Farm (Norwegian: Vikna vindmøllepark) was a wind farm located on Husfjellet, just west of the village of Garstad on the island Mellom-Vikna in Nærøysund Municipality in Trøndelag county, Norway. The wind farm consisted of five wind turbines, with an installed capacity of 2.2 megawatts (3,000 hp) (calculated as 3 x 0.4 MW + 2 x 0.5 MW), with an average annual production of 5.8 gigawatt-hours (21 TJ). The wind farm began operation in 1991 and was owned by Nord-Trøndelag Elektrisitetsverk. It was decommissioned in 2015.
