= Mellom-Vikna =

Island in Trøndelag, Norway

- Interactive map of Mellom-Vikna

Geography
- Location: Trøndelag, Norway
- Coordinates: 64.8960°N 10.9763°E
- Area: 57.43 km^{2} (22.17 sq mi)
- Length: 21.5 km (13.36 mi)
- Width: 4.4 km (2.73 mi)
- Highest elevation: 157 m (515 ft)
- Highest point: Dragstinden

Administration
- Norway
- County: Trøndelag
- Municipality: Nærøysund Municipality

Mellom-Vikna is the smallest of the three major islands in Nærøysund Municipality in Trøndelag county, Norway. The 57-square-kilometre (22 sq mi) island is the site of Vikna Wind Farm near Garstad. The island is the middle island of the three main islands in the Vikna archipelago, hence its name which means "middle-Vikna". The Norwegian County Road 770 connects the three islands to the mainland via the Nærøysund Bridge.

== See also ==
- List of islands of Norway
