= Ytter-Vikna =

Island in Trøndelag, Norway

- Interactive map of Ytter-Vikna

Geography
- Location: Trøndelag, Norway
- Coordinates: 64.9113°N 10.8821°E
- Area: 82 km^{2} (32 sq mi)
- Length: 25 km (15.5 mi)
- Width: 7 km (4.3 mi)
- Highest elevation: 173 m (568 ft)
- Highest point: Vattafjellet

Administration
- Norway
- County: Trøndelag
- Municipality: Nærøysund Municipality

Ytter-Vikna is one of the three major islands in Nærøysund Municipality in Trøndelag county, Norway. It is located in the western part of the municipality. Norwegian County Road 770 crosses the 82-square-kilometre (32 sq mi) island. The villages of Austafjord and Valøya are located on this island.

== See also ==
- List of islands of Norway
