= Lang Sound =

Lang Sound (67°9′S 58°40′E) is a sound 1.5 nautical miles (3 km) wide at its narrowest point and 9 nautical miles (17 km) long, lying between the group of islands that includes Broka Island and Havstein Island and Law Promontory. It was mapped by Norwegian cartographers from aerial photographs taken by the Lars Christensen Expedition in January–February 1937 and named Langsundet (the long sound).
