= Havstein =

Havstein can refer to:

- Havstein parish, parish in Trondheim, Norway
- Havstein Church, located in Havstein parish
- Havstein Island, Antarctica
