= Sverresborg Church =

Church in Trøndelag, Norway

- Sverresborg kirkesenter
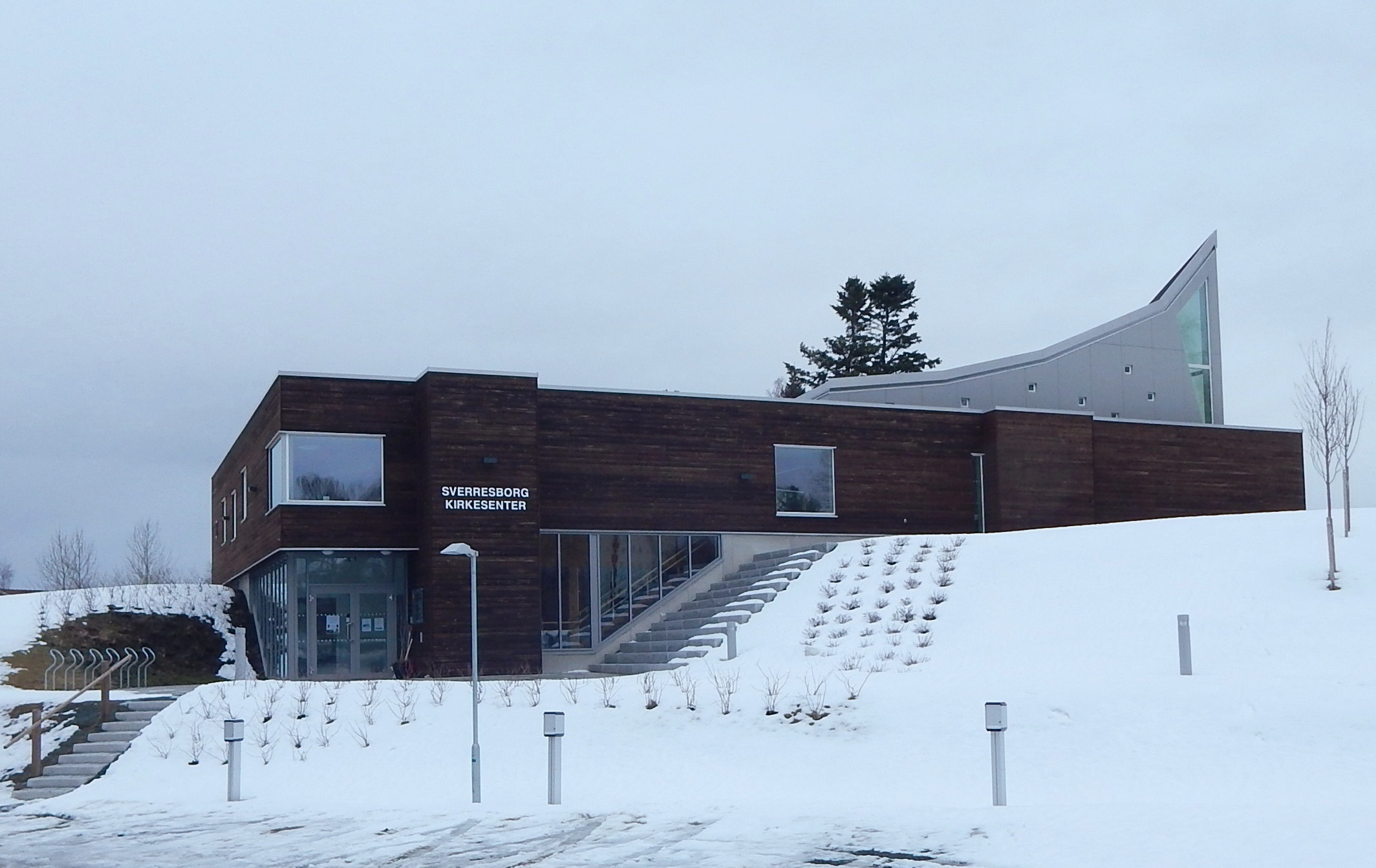
- View of the church
- Sverresborg Church
- 63.414606982°N 10.3534233570°E
- Location: Trondheim Municipality, Trøndelag
- Country: Norway
- Denomination: Church of Norway
- Churchmanship: Evangelical Lutheran

History
- Status: Parish church
- Founded: 2014
- Consecrated: 7 Sept 2014

Architecture
- Functional status: Active
- Architect: Stein Halvorsen
- Architectural type: Rectangular
- Completed: 2014 (12 years ago)

Specifications
- Capacity: 150
- Materials: Wood and fiber cement siding

Administration
- Diocese: Nidaros bispedømme
- Deanery: Heimdal og Byåsen prosti
- Parish: Sverresborg

Sverresborg Church (Norwegian: Sverresborg kirkesenter) is a parish church of the Church of Norway in Trondheim Municipality in Trøndelag county, Norway. It is located in the Sverresborg neighborhood in the district of Byåsen in the city of Trondheim. It is one of the churches in the Sverresborg parish (the other is Havstein Church). The parish is part of the Heimdal og Byåsen prosti (deanery) in the Diocese of Nidaros. The wood church is clad with fiber cement siding and it was built in a modern, rectangular design in 2014 by the architect Stein Halvorsen.

== History ==
The parish of Sverresborg was created in 1970 when it was separated from the large Byåsen Church parish. Initially, the parish of Sverresborg consisted of one church, Havstein Church. A second church was later needed for the parish, so in 2006 an architectural competition was held for the new church. It was won by Stein Halvorsen with a project called "With the sky as a roof". The 500-square-metre (5,400 sq ft) church cost about 16 million kr to build. The building was consecrated on 7 September 2014.

== See also ==
- List of churches in Nidaros
