= Hoeggen Church =

Church in Trøndelag, Norway

- Hoeggen kirke
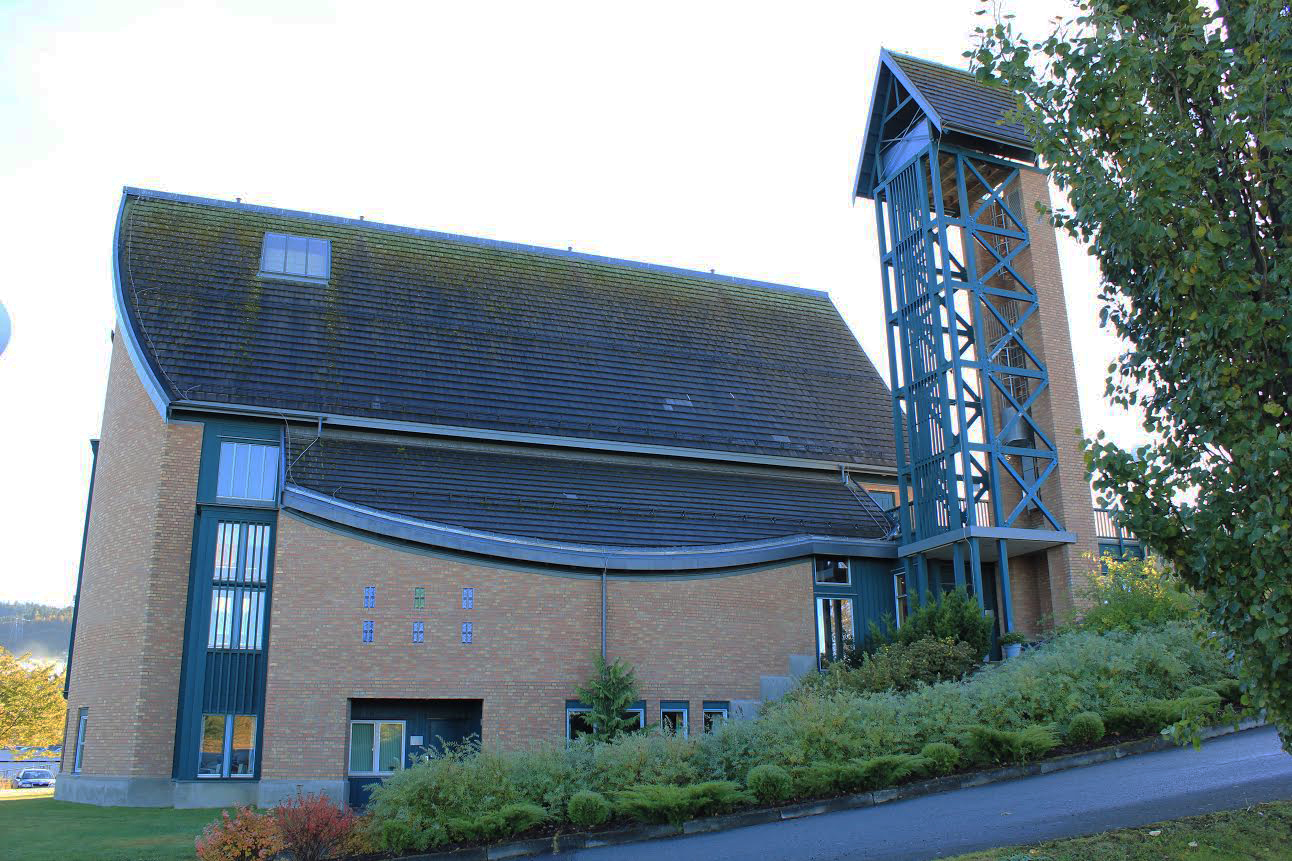
- View of the church
- Hoeggen Church
- 63.397712773°N 10.429584682°E
- Location: Trondheim Municipality, Trøndelag
- Country: Norway
- Denomination: Church of Norway
- Churchmanship: Evangelical Lutheran

History
- Status: Parish church
- Founded: 1979
- Consecrated: 12 Oct 1997

Architecture
- Functional status: Active
- Architect: Madsø Sveen
- Architectural type: Long church
- Completed: 1997 (29 years ago)

Specifications
- Capacity: 430
- Materials: Brick

Administration
- Diocese: Nidaros bispedømme
- Deanery: Strinda prosti
- Parish: Nidelven

Hoeggen Church (Norwegian: Hoeggen kirke) is a parish church of the Church of Norway in Trondheim Municipality in Trøndelag county, Norway. It is located in the Lerkendal area in the city of Trondheim. It is one of the churches for the Nidelven parish which is part of the Strinda prosti (deanery) in the Diocese of Nidaros. The tan brick church was built in a long church style in 1997 using plans drawn up by the architectural firm Madsø Sveen. The church seats about 430 people.

== History ==
The new parish of Hoeggen was established in 1979 when it was separated from the large Strinda Church parish. The congregation first rented a room at the Utleira school and then later at the Hoeggen school. In 1987, the congregation bought an old barracks building to use as an interim church on the road Nordre Risvolltun. In the late 1990s, the congregation hired the architecture firm Madsø Sveen to design a permanent church. The new church was completed in 1997. It was consecrated on 12 October 1997.

== Media gallery ==
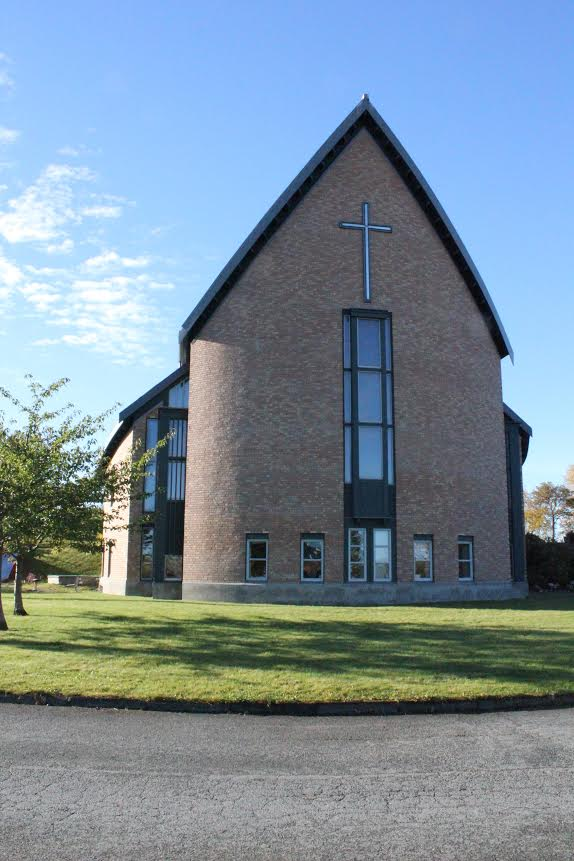

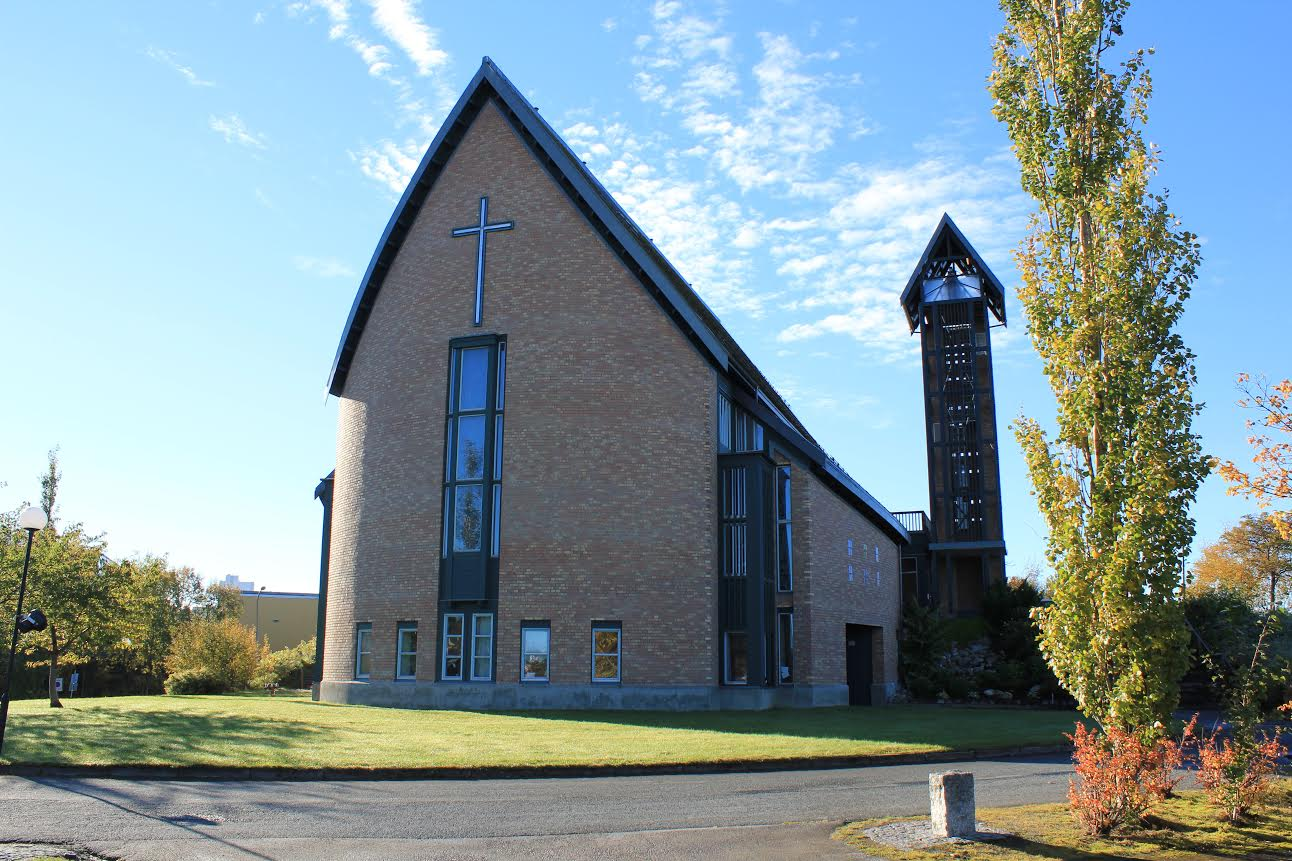

== See also ==
- List of churches in Nidaros
