= Charlottenlund Church =

Church in Trøndelag, Norway

- Charlottenlund kirke
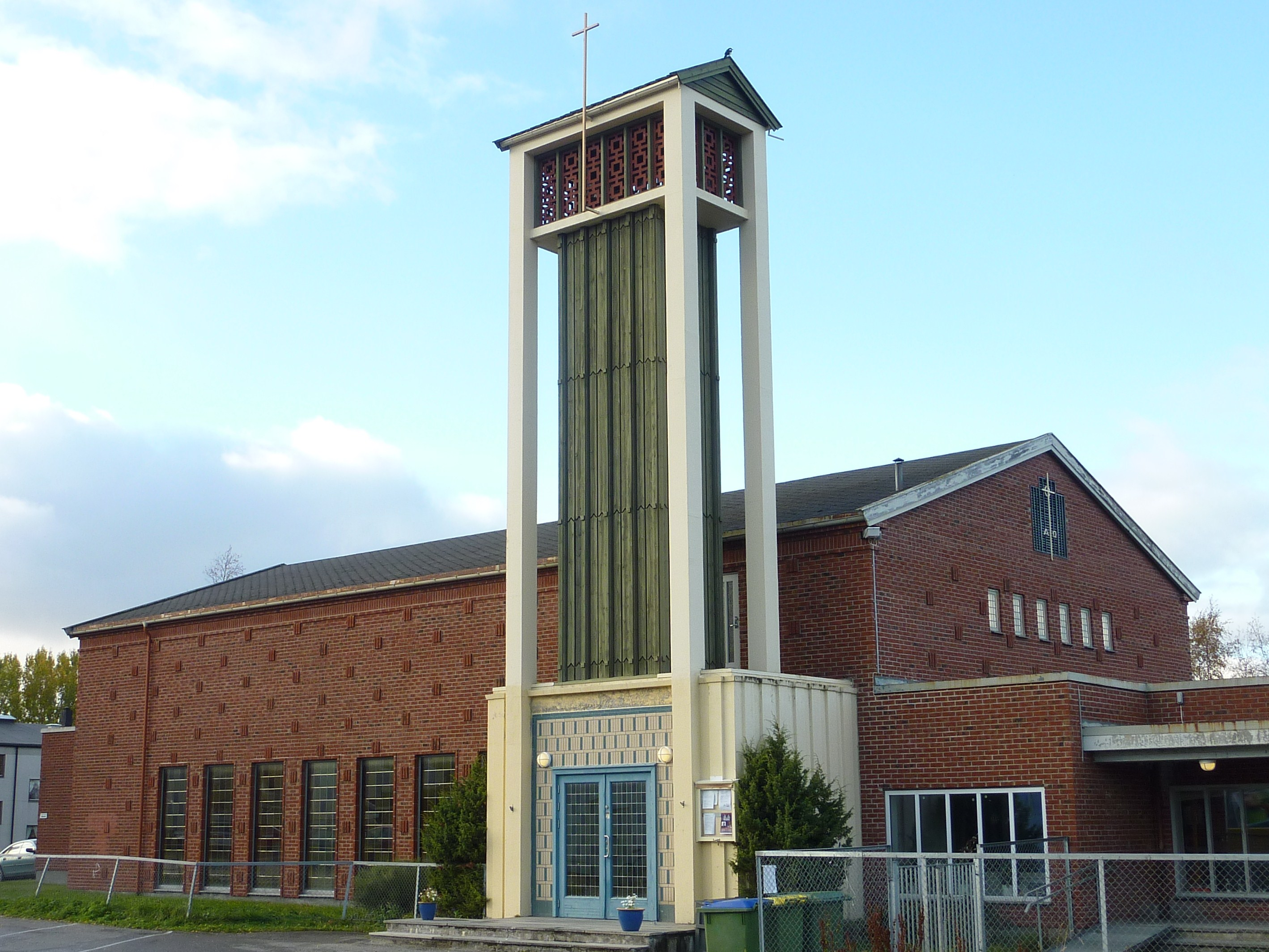
- View of the church
- Charlottenlund Church
- 63.4131420113°N 10.4443609717°E
- Location: Trondheim Municipality, Trøndelag
- Country: Norway
- Denomination: Church of Norway
- Churchmanship: Evangelical Lutheran

History
- Status: Parish church
- Founded: 1973
- Consecrated: 1973

Architecture
- Functional status: Active
- Architect: Roar Tønseth
- Architectural type: Long church
- Groundbreaking: 1970
- Completed: 1973 (53 years ago)

Specifications
- Capacity: 350
- Materials: Brick

Administration
- Diocese: Nidaros bispedømme
- Deanery: Strinda prosti
- Parish: Ranheim og Charlottenlund
- Norwegian Cultural Heritage Site
- Type: Church
- Status: Not protected
- ID: 84006

Charlottenlund Church (Norwegian: Charlottenlund kirke) is a parish church of the Church of Norway in Trondheim Municipality in Trøndelag county, Norway. It is located in the Charlottenlund neighborhood, east of downtown part of the city of Trondheim. It is one of the churches for the Ranheim og Charlottenlund parish which is part of the Strinda prosti (deanery) in the Diocese of Nidaros. The red brick church was built in a long church style in 1973 by the architect Roar Tønseth. The church seats about 350 people.

== See also ==
- List of churches in Nidaros
