= Beitstad Church =

Church in Trøndelag, Norway

- Beitstad kirke
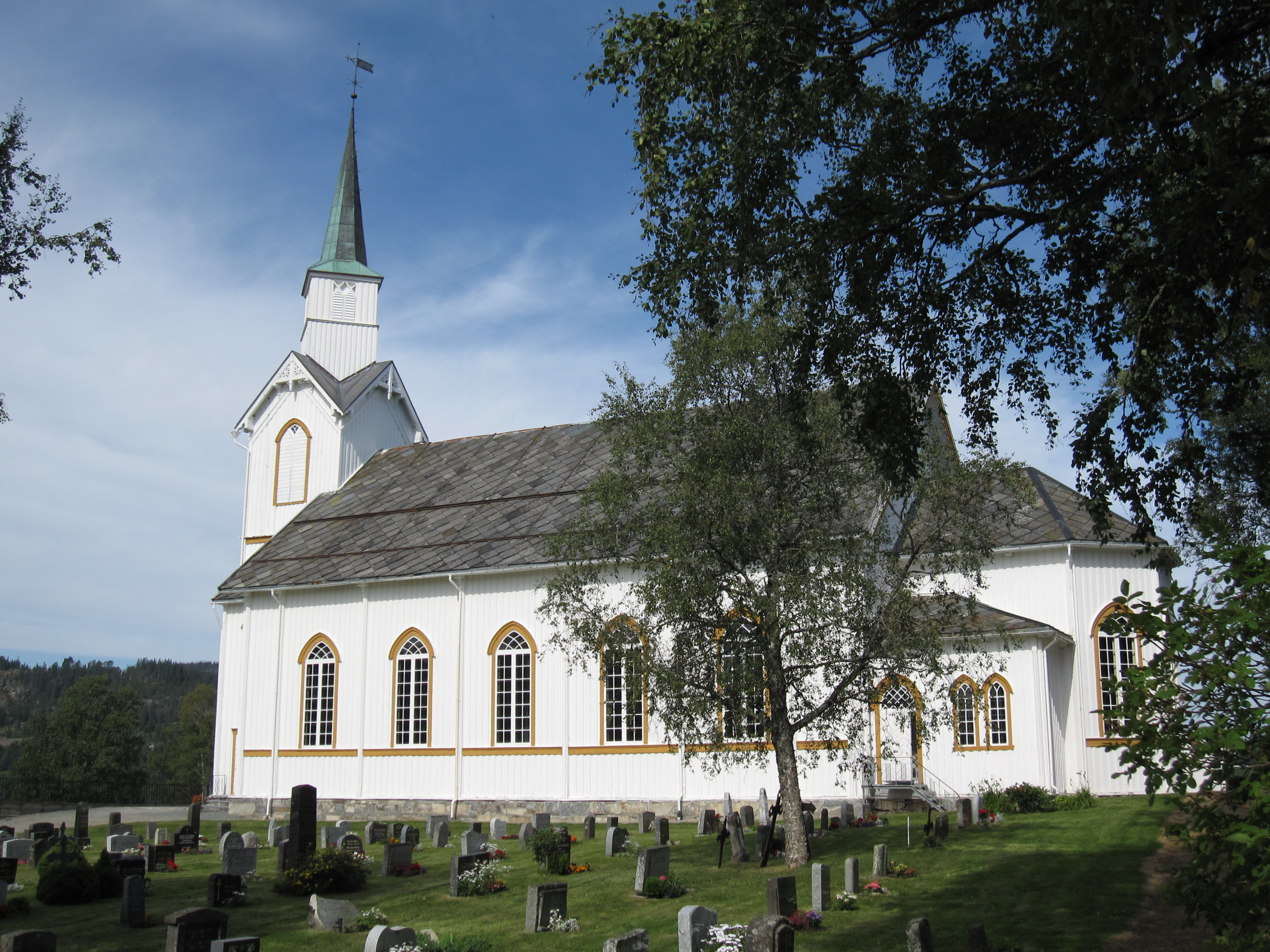
- View of the church
- Beitstad Church
- 64.086695276°N 11.3283701241°E
- Location: Steinkjer Municipality, Trøndelag
- Country: Norway
- Denomination: Church of Norway
- Churchmanship: Evangelical Lutheran

History
- Former name: Solberg kirke
- Status: Parish church
- Founded: 13th century
- Consecrated: 19 Sept 1869

Architecture
- Functional status: Active
- Architect: Jacob Wilhelm Nordan
- Architectural type: Long church
- Completed: 1869 (157 years ago)

Specifications
- Capacity: 700
- Materials: Wood

Administration
- Diocese: Nidaros bispedømme
- Deanery: Stiklestad prosti
- Parish: Beitstad
- Norwegian Cultural Heritage Site
- Type: Church
- Status: Listed
- ID: 83860

Beitstad Church (Norwegian: Beitstad kirke) is a parish church of the Church of Norway in Steinkjer Municipality in Trøndelag county, Norway. It is located in the village of Beitstad. It is the main church for the Beitstad parish which is part of the Stiklestad prosti (deanery) in the Diocese of Nidaros. The white, wooden church was built in a long church style in 1869 using plans drawn up by the architect Jacob Wilhelm Nordan. The church seats about 700 people. The church was originally called Solberg Church.

== History ==
The earliest existing historical records of the church date back to the year 1432, but the church was not new that year. The old stave church was built about 350 metres (1,150 ft) northeast of the present church site. During the 1600s, the old church was in poor condition so it was torn down and a new timber-framed building was constructed about 350 metres (1,150 ft) to the southwest.

In 1814, this church served as an election church (Norwegian: valgkirke). Together with more than 300 other parish churches across Norway, it was a polling station for elections to the 1814 Norwegian Constituent Assembly which wrote the Constitution of Norway. This was Norway's first national elections. Each church parish was a constituency that elected people called "electors" who later met together in each county to elect the representatives for the assembly that was to meet at Eidsvoll Manor later that year.

By the 1860s, the church was too small for the parish so in 1863, the parish decided to get permission to replace the old church. In 1869, the old church was torn down and replaced with a new wooden long church on the same site. Rasmus Overrein was the lead builder for the new church. It was consecrate on 19 September 1869. The church was renovated in 1932 using the designs of Roar Tønseth.

== See also ==
- List of churches in Nidaros
