= Broka Island =

Antarctic island

- Location within Antarctica

Geography
- Location: Antarctica
- Coordinates: 67°7′S 58°36′E
- Length: 7.4 km (4.6 mi)
- Highest elevation: 140 m (460 ft)

Administration
- Administered under the Antarctic Treaty System

Demographics
- Population: Uninhabited

Broka Island (67°7′S 58°36′E) is a rocky island, 7.4 kilometres (4 nmi) long and rising to 140 metres (460 ft), with a prominent cove indenting the north side, situated 3.7 kilometres (2 nmi) north of Law Promontory and 1.9 kilometres (1 nmi) west of Havstein Island. It was mapped by Norwegian cartographers from aerial photographs taken by the Lars Christensen Expedition, 1936–37. They applied the name Broka (the trousers) because the outline of the island resembles that of a pair of trousers.

== See also ==
- Lang Sound, a sound lying between the group of islands that includes Broka Island
- List of Antarctic and sub-Antarctic islands
