= Kopperå Chapel =

Church in Trøndelag, Norway

- Kopperå kapell
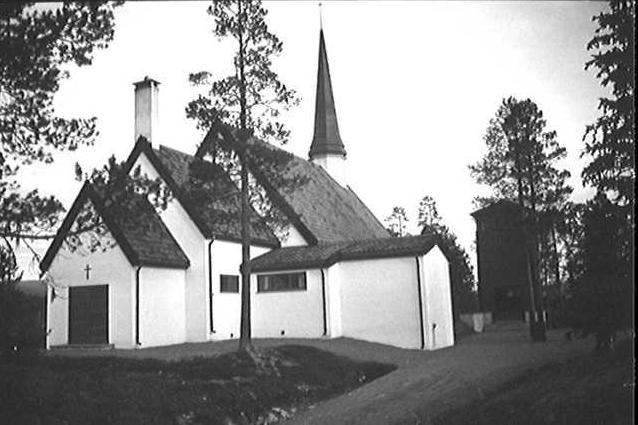
- View of the church
- Kopperå Chapel
- 63.399748651°N 11.840310215°E
- Location: Meråker Municipality, Trøndelag
- Country: Norway
- Denomination: Church of Norway
- Churchmanship: Evangelical Lutheran

History
- Status: Parish church
- Founded: 1936
- Consecrated: 1936

Architecture
- Functional status: Active
- Architect: Roar Tønseth
- Architectural type: Long church
- Completed: 1936 (90 years ago)

Specifications
- Capacity: 150
- Materials: Stone

Administration
- Diocese: Nidaros bispedømme
- Deanery: Stjørdal prosti
- Parish: Meråker
- Norwegian Cultural Heritage Site
- Type: Church
- Status: Not protected
- ID: 84820

Kopperå Chapel (Norwegian: Kopperå kapell) is a parish church of the Church of Norway in Meråker Municipality in Trøndelag county, Norway. It is located in the village of Kopperå. It is one of the three churches in the Meråker parish which is part of the Stjørdal prosti (deanery) in the Diocese of Nidaros. The white, stone church was built in a long church style in 1936 based upon designs by architect Roar Tønseth (1895-1985). The church seats about 150 people.

== See also ==
- List of churches in Nidaros
