= Tempe Church =

Church in Trøndelag, Norway

- Tempe kirke
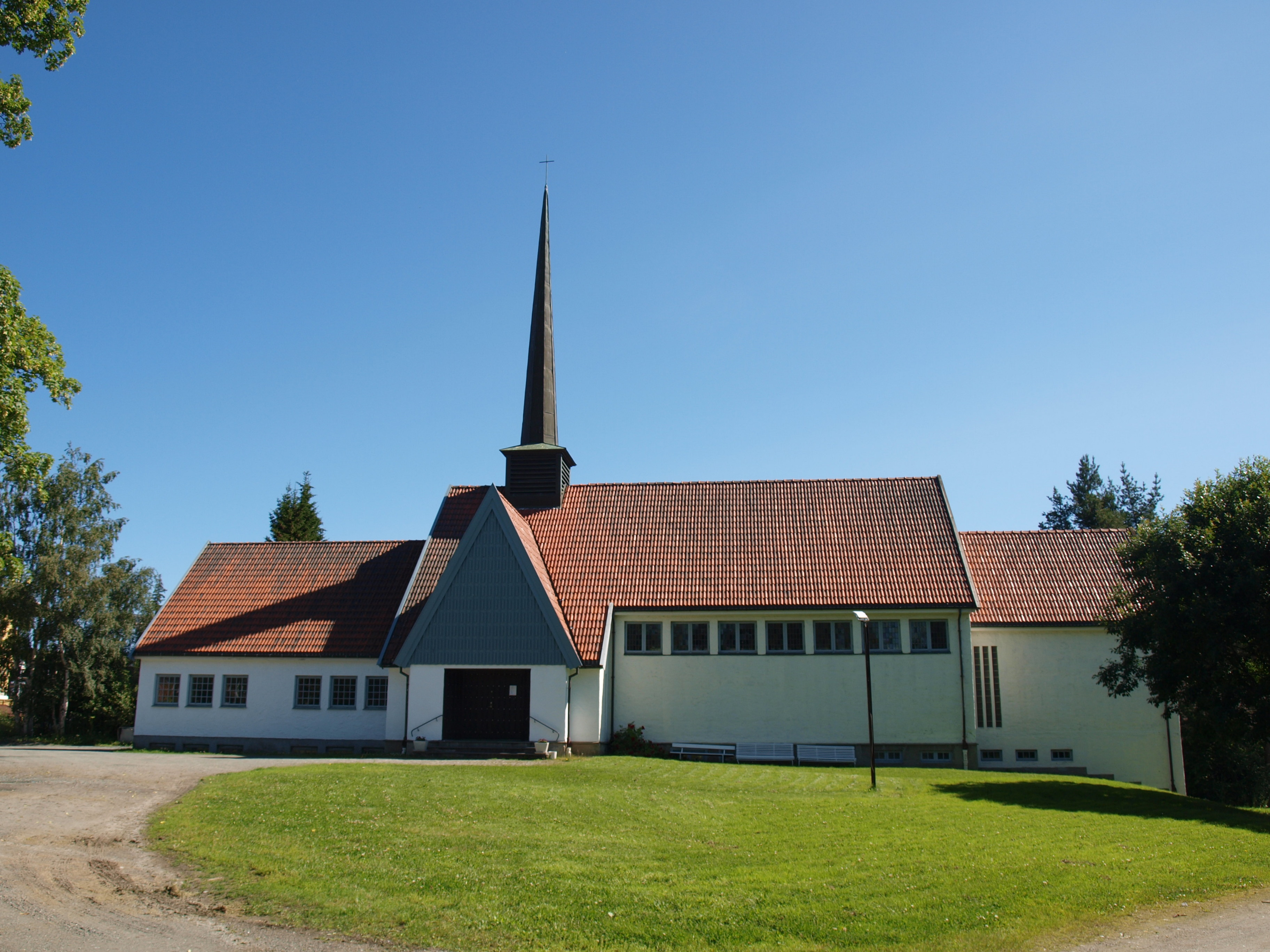
- View of the church
- Tempe Church
- 63.411045858°N 10.4005524516°E
- Location: Trondheim Municipality, Trøndelag
- Country: Norway
- Denomination: Church of Norway
- Churchmanship: Evangelical Lutheran

History
- Former name: Tempe og Valene småkirke
- Status: Parish church
- Founded: 1960
- Consecrated: 1960

Architecture
- Functional status: Active
- Architect: Roar Tønseth
- Architectural type: Long church
- Completed: 1960 (66 years ago)

Specifications
- Capacity: 240
- Materials: Brick

Administration
- Diocese: Nidaros bispedømme
- Deanery: Strinda prosti
- Parish: Nidelven
- Norwegian Cultural Heritage Site
- Type: Church
- Status: Not protected
- ID: 85614

Tempe Church (Norwegian: Tempe kirke) is a parish church of the Church of Norway in Trondheim Municipality in Trøndelag county, Norway. It is located in the Lerkendal area in the city of Trondheim, between the old European route E6 highway and Lerkendal Stadion. It is one of the churches for the Nidelven parish which is part of the Strinda prosti (deanery) in the Diocese of Nidaros. The white plastered brick church was built in a long church style in 1960 using plans drawn up by the architect Roar Tønseth. The church seats about 240 people.

== History ==
The first church here was built in the late 1950s and it was completed in 1960. The new building was consecrated on 24 April 1960 by the Bishop Arne Fjellbu. In 1975, the church was expanded to the north.

== See also ==
- List of churches in Nidaros
