= Cirque Fjord =

Fjord in Antarctica

Cirque Fjord (67°18′S 58°39′E) is an ice-filled inlet on the south side of Law Promontory opening into Stefansson Bay in Enderby Land. It was mapped by Norwegian cartographers from air photos taken by the Lars Christensen Expedition, 1936–37, and named Botnfjorden (the cirque fjord). It was seen by an Australian National Antarctic Research Expeditions party in 1956. The translated form of the name recommended by the Antarctic Names Committee of Australia has been approved.
