= Byåsen Church =

Church in Trøndelag, Norway

- Byåsen kirke
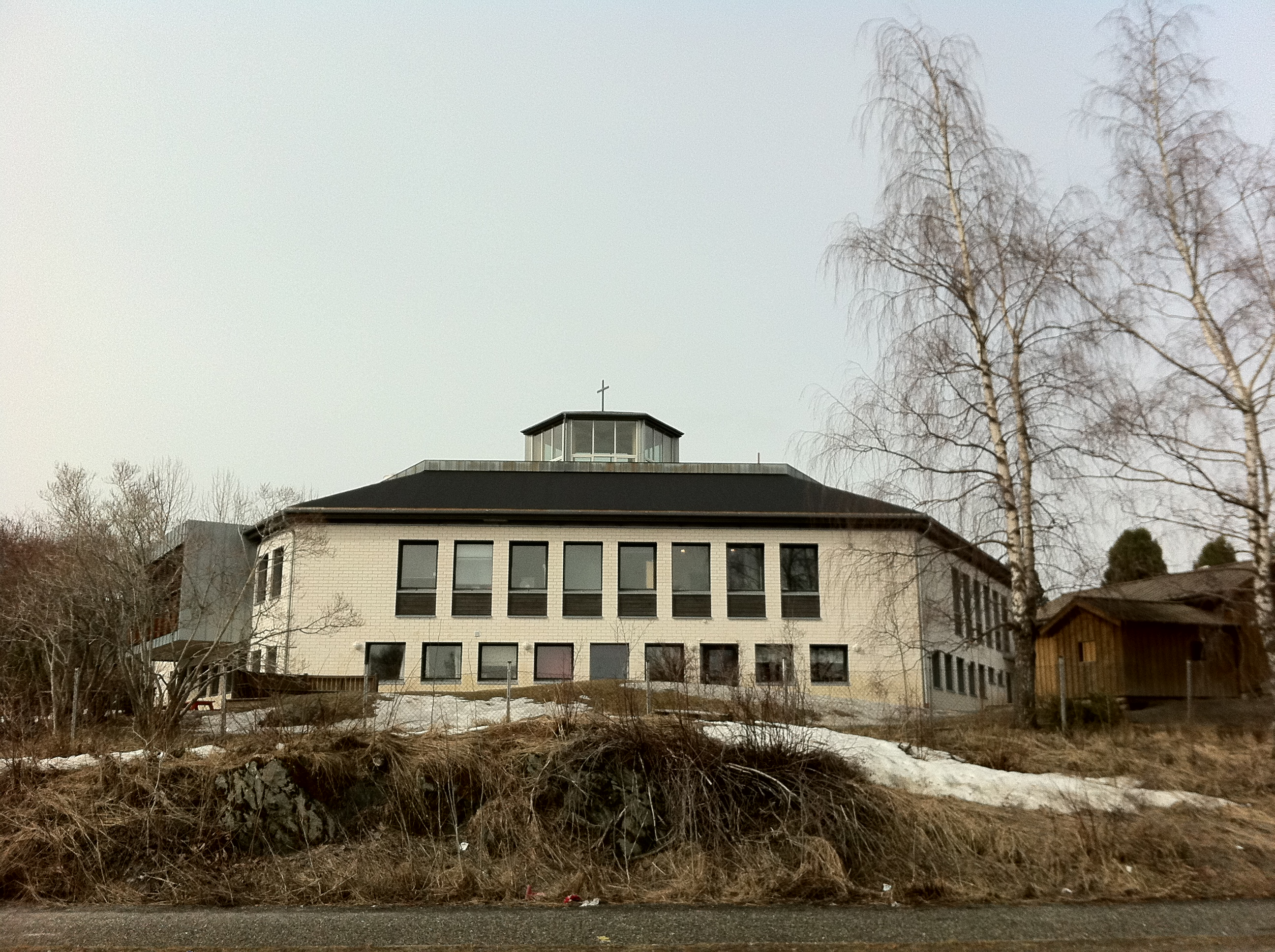
- View of the church
- Byåsen Church
- 63.3925°N 10.3696°E
- Location: Trondheim Municipality, Trøndelag
- Country: Norway
- Denomination: Church of Norway
- Churchmanship: Evangelical Lutheran

History
- Former name: Hallset kirke
- Status: Parish church
- Founded: 1974
- Consecrated: 1 December 1974

Architecture
- Functional status: Active
- Architect(s): Johan Arnstad and Ottar Heggenhougen
- Architectural type: Hexagonal
- Style: Modern
- Completed: 1974 (52 years ago)

Specifications
- Capacity: 525
- Materials: Concrete

Administration
- Diocese: Nidaros bispedømme
- Deanery: Heimdal og Byåsen prosti
- Parish: Byåsen
- Norwegian Cultural Heritage Site
- Type: Church
- Status: Not protected
- ID: 84465

Byåsen Church (Norwegian: Byåsen kirke, historically Hallset Church) is a parish church of the Church of Norway in Trondheim Municipality in Trøndelag county, Norway. It is located in the Byåsen neighborhood in the city of Trondheim. It is the church for the Byåsen parish which is part of the Heimdal og Byåsen prosti (deanery) in the Diocese of Nidaros. The modern, concrete church was built in a hexagonal design in 1974 using plans drawn up by the architects Johan Arnstad and Ottar Heggenhougen. The church seats about 525 people.

== History ==
The church was built in 1974 and it was consecrated on 1 December 1974 by the bishop Tord Godal. The church was originally called Hallset Church, but the name was changed to better reflect the area that it served. The church building was extensively remodeled in 2004 by the Eggen Architects. The church building also houses parish offices and a day care centre. There is no cemetery on site. The nearest cemetery is at Havstein Church.

== See also ==
- List of churches in Nidaros
