= Blackrock Head =

Rock formation in Antarctica

Blackrock Head (67°15′S 58°59′E) is a conspicuous coastal rock outcrop on the eastern part of Law Promontory, 3 nautical miles (6 km) northwest of Tryne Point in Antarctica. It was discovered in February 1936 by Discovery Investigations personnel on the William Scoresby and so named by them for its black, rocky appearance.
