= Berg Church (Trondheim) =

Church in Trøndelag, Norway

- Berg kirke
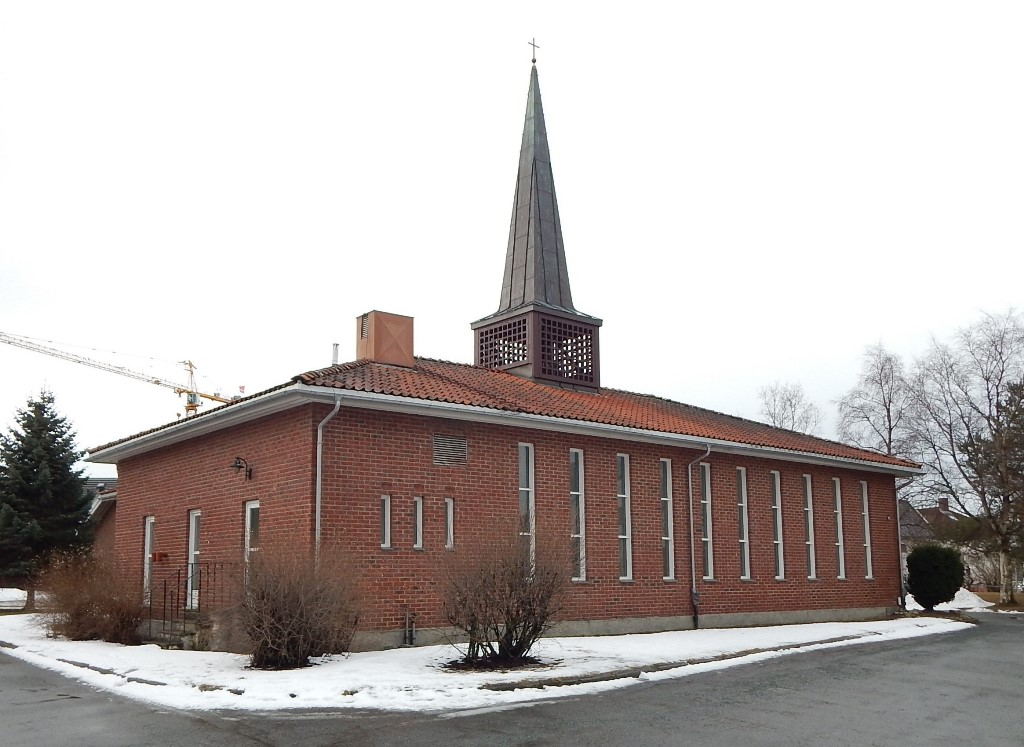
- View of the church
- Berg Church
- 63.422574305°N 10.425070256°E
- Location: Trondheim Municipality, Trøndelag
- Country: Norway
- Denomination: Church of Norway
- Churchmanship: Evangelical Lutheran

History
- Status: Parish church
- Founded: 1972
- Consecrated: 19 Mar 1972

Architecture
- Functional status: Active
- Architect(s): Tycho Castberg, Nils Lien, and Sverre Risan
- Architectural type: Long church
- Completed: 1972 (54 years ago)

Specifications
- Capacity: 250
- Materials: Brick

Administration
- Diocese: Nidaros bispedømme
- Deanery: Strinda prosti
- Parish: Berg
- Norwegian Cultural Heritage Site
- Type: Church
- Status: Not protected
- ID: 83867

Berg Church (Norwegian: Berg kirke) is a parish church of the Church of Norway in Trondheim Municipality in Trøndelag county, Norway. It is located in the Berg area in the city of Trondheim. It is the church for the Berg parish which is part of the Strinda prosti (deanery) in the Diocese of Nidaros. The red, brick church was built in a long church style in 1972 using plans drawn up by the architects Tycho Castberg, Nils Lien, and Sverre Risan. The church seats about 250 people.

== History ==
The Berg Church Association was founded in 1937 with the aim of building a church building at Berg in Trondheim. The initiator and first leader was the rector Tycho Castberg, who according to the congregation also drew a draft for the church building. After the money was raised, the architecture firm of Lien & Risan was hired. The church was consecrated on 19 March 1972 by the Bishop Tord Godal. The church was originally named Berg arbeidskirke. The church was expanded in 1981–1982 and it also got a new bell tower in 1991. In 1995, Berg became its own parish at that time, the church was renamed simply Berg kirke.

== See also ==
- List of churches in Nidaros
