= List of churches in Nidaros =

Map of the Church of Norway deaneries in the Diocese of Nidaros. Each municipality belongs to a deanery except for Trondheim municipality is divided over three deaneries due to its large population.

This list of churches in Nidaros is a list of the Church of Norway churches in the Diocese of Nidaros in Norway. It includes all of the parishes in Trøndelag county. The diocese is based at the Nidaros Cathedral in the city of Trondheim in Trondheim Municipality.

The list is divided into several sections, one for each deanery (prosti; headed by a provost) in the diocese. Administratively within each deanery, the churches within each municipality elects their own church council (fellesråd). Each municipality may have one or more parishes (sokn) within the municipality. Each parish elects their own councils (soknerådet). Each parish has one or more local church.

The municipality of Trondheim includes several deaneries within the municipality due to its large population. The number and size of the deaneries and parishes has changed over time. In 1995, the old Sør-Fosen prosti was merged with Orkdal prosti and on the same date the old Nord-Fosen prosti was renamed simply Fosen prosti. On 1 July 2015, the Nærøy prosti, which included Leka Municipality, Vikna Municipality, and Nærøy Municipality, was merged with the Namdal prosti. On 1 January 2020, the old Nord-Innherad prosti and Sør-Innherad prosti were merged to form the new Stiklestad prosti.

== Nidaros domprosti ==
The Nidaros arch-deanery (Norwegian: domprosti) covers the urban city centre of the city of Trondheim, located along the Trondheimsfjorden in Trondheim Municipality. The Nidaros Cathedral is the seat of the Bishop of the Diocese of Nidaros as well as the Dean of the deanery. This arch-deanery is divided into three parishes with a total of five churches.

Municipality	Parish (sokn)	Church	Location	Year built	Photo
Trondheim	Nidaros Domkirke og Vår Frue	Nidaros Cathedral	Trondheim	1070–1300	
Trondheim	Nidaros Domkirke og Vår Frue	Vår Frue Church	Trondheim	1200	
Trondheim	Bakklandet og Lademoen	Bakke Church	Trondheim	1715	
Trondheim	Bakklandet og Lademoen	Lademoen Church	Lademoen	1905	
Trondheim	Lade	Lade Church	Lade	1190	

== Fosen prosti ==
This deanery (Norwegian: prosti) covers the Fosen peninsula in Trøndelag county. The area lies between the Norwegian Sea and Trondheim Fjord. It includes the municipalities of Osen, Åfjord, Ørland, and Indre Fosen. The deanery is divided up into 14 parishes. The deanery is headquartered at Stadsbygd Church in the village of Stadsbygd in Indre Fosen Municipality.

This deanery was established as Nordre Fosen prosti in 1917 when the historic Fosen prosti was divided into Nordre Fosen prosti in the north and Søndre Fosen prosti in the south. Originally, the Nordre Fosen prosti included the parishes of Bjørnør, Åfjord, Bjugn, and Stadsbygd while Søndre Fosen prosti included the parishes of Frøya, Hitra, Hemne, Agdenes, and Ørland. A royal resolution on 19 May 1922 changed the deanery names from "Nordre Fosen prosti" to "Nord-Fosen prosti" and "Søndre Fosen prosti" to "Sør-Fosen prosti". On 1 January 1972, the parish of Ørland Municipality was transferred to this deanery from the Sør-Fosen prosti. On 1 July 1999, the old Sør-Fosen prosti was dissolved and it became part of the Orkdal prosti. On the same date, the name of this deanery was changed to simply Fosen prosti.

Municipality	Parish (sokn)	Church	Location	Year built	Photo
Indre Fosen	Hasselvika	Hasselvika Church	Hasselvika	1951	
Indre Fosen	Leksvik	Leksvik Church	Leksvik	1670	
Indre Fosen	Rissa	Fines Church	Verrabotn	1913	
Indre Fosen	Rissa	Rissa Church	Leira	1888	
Indre Fosen	Rissa	Rein Church	Reinsgrenda	1932	
Indre Fosen	Stadsbygd	Stadsbygd Church	Stadsbygd	1842	
Indre Fosen	Stranda	Stranda Church	Vanvikan	1897	
Indre Fosen	Sør-Stjørna	Frengen Church	Frengen	1972	
Indre Fosen	Sør-Stjørna	Ramsvik Church	Råkvåg	1909	
Osen	Osen	Osen Church	Steinsdalen	1877	
Osen	Osen	Seter Chapel	Seter	1969	
Ørland	Bjugn	Bjugn Church	Bjugn	1956	
Ørland	Bjugn	Heggvik Church	Høybakken	1858	
Ørland	Jøssund	Jøssund Church	Jøssund	1875	
Ørland	Nes	Nes Church	Nes	1878	
Ørland	Nes	Tarva Chapel	Tarva	1972	
Ørland	Ørland	Ørland Church	Brekstad	1342	
Ørland	Ørland	Storfosna Church	Storfosna	1915	
Åfjord	Roan	Roan Church	Roan	1702	
Åfjord	Åfjord	Åfjord Church	Årnes	1879	
Åfjord	Stoksund	Stoksund Church	Revsnes	1825	

== Gauldal prosti ==
This deanery (Norwegian: prosti) covers the Gauldalen valley and surrounding areas in southern Trøndelag county. It includes the parishes in the municipalities of Holtålen, Melhus, Midtre Gauldal, Oppdal, Rennebu, and Røros. The deanery is headquartered at Støren Church in the village of Støren in Midtre Gauldal Municipality.

The deanery was established on 20 April 1911 when the old Nordre Dalernes prosti and Søndre Dalernes prosti were dissolved and split into three new deaneries. On that date, the parishes of Støren, Holtålen, Røros from Søndre Dalernes prosti and the parish of Melhus from Nordre Dalernes prosti became part of the new Orkedalens prosti. A royal resolution on 19 May 1922 changed the deanery name from "Guldalen prosti" to "Gauldal prosti". In 2000, the parishes of Oppdal and Rennebu were moved from Orkdal prosti to Gauldal prosti.

Municipality	Parish (sokn)	Church	Location	Year built	Photo
Holtålen	Haltdalen	Haltdalen Church	Haltdalen	1881	
Holtålen	Haltdalen	Haltdalen Stave Church	Haltdalen; **Moved to a museum in Trondheim**	1170	
Holtålen	Haltdalen	Aunegrenda Chapel	Aunegrenda	1952	
Holtålen	Hessdalen	Hessdalen Church	Hessdalen	1940	
Holtålen	Ålen	Ålen Church	Renbygda	1881	
Melhus	Flå	Flå Church	Ler	1794	
Melhus	Horg	Horg Church	Lundamo	1892	
Melhus	Hølonda	Hølonda Church	Gåsbakken	1848	
Melhus	Melhus	Melhus Church	Storsand	1892	
Midtre Gauldal	Budal	Budal Church	Enodden	1754	
Midtre Gauldal	Singsås	Singsås Church	Singsås	1884	
Midtre Gauldal	Soknedal	Soknedal Church	Soknedal	1933	
Midtre Gauldal	Støren	Støren Church	Støren	1817	
Oppdal	Fagerhaug	Fagerhaug Church	Fagerhaug	1921	
Oppdal	Lønset	Lønset Church	Lønset	1863	
Oppdal	Oppdal	Oppdal Church	Oppdal	1651	
Oppdal	Oppdal	St. Mikael's Chapel	Drivdalen	2012	
Rennebu	Berkåk	Berkåk Church	Berkåk	1878	
Rennebu	Innset	Innset Church	Innset	2000	
Rennebu	Rennebu	Rennebu Church	Voll	1669	
Rennebu	Rennebu	Nerskogen Chapel	Nerskogen	1962	
Røros	Røros	Røros Church	Røros	1784	
Røros	Røros	Røros Chapel	Røros	1962	
Røros	Brekken	Brekken Church	Brekken	1878	
Røros	Glåmos	Glåmos Church	Glåmos	1926	
Røros	Hitterdalen	Hitterdal Chapel	Hitterdalen	1959	

== Heimdal og Byåsen prosti ==
This deanery (Norwegian: prosti) covers the southern and western areas of Trondheim Municipality. The deanery is divided up into eight parishes. The deanery is headquartered at Heimdal Church in the village of Heimdal in Trondheim Municipality.

The deanery was established on 1 October 2017 when the old Byåsen prosti was merged with the Heimdal prosti. The old Byåsen prosti covered the western part of the city centre of Trondheim. The Dean of the old deanery of Byåsen was headquartered at the Byåsen Church in the Byåsen area of Trondheim. Byåsen prosti was created in 2004 when the Byåsen and Sverresborg parishes from the Heimdal prosti and the Ilen parish from Nidaros domprosti were moved to the new deanery.

Municipality	Parish (sokn)	Church	Location	Year built	Photo
Trondheim	Byneset og Leinstrand	Byneset Church	Byneset	1180	
Trondheim	Byneset og Leinstrand	Leinstrand Church	Nypan	1673	
Trondheim	Byåsen	Byåsen Church	Byåsen	1974	
Trondheim	Heimdal	Heimdal Church	Heimdal	1960	
Trondheim	Ilen	Ilen Church	Ila	1889	
Trondheim	Klæbu	Klæbu Church	Klæbu	1790	
Trondheim	Klæbu	Vassfjell Chapel	Vassfjellet	1974	
Trondheim	Kolstad	Kolstad Church	Kolstad	1986	
Trondheim	Sverresborg	Havstein Church	Sverresborg	1857	
Trondheim	Sverresborg	Sverresborg Church	Sverresborg	2014	
Trondheim	Tiller	Tiller Church	Tiller	1901	

== Namdal prosti ==
This deanery (Norwegian: prosti) covers the vast northern part of Trøndelag county, covering the municipalities of Lierne, Røyrvik, Namsskogan, Grong, Høylandet, Overhalla, Namsos, Flatanger, Nærøysund, and Leka. Those municipalities are further divided up into 17 parishes. The deanery is headquartered at Namsos Church in the town of Namsos in Namsos Municipality.

This deanery was established in 1973 when the old Indre Namdal prosti (Lierne, Grong, Overhalla, and Namsos) and Ytre Namdal prosti (Flatanger and Fosnes) were merged to form the new Namdal prosti (the parish of Snåsa, from Indre Namdal prosti, became part of Nord-Innherad prosti at the same time). On 1 July 2015, the old Nærøy prosti was dissolved and all of its parishes in Nærøy, Leka, and Vikna municipalities were merged into the Namdal prosti. On 1 January 2020, the churches in the old Namdalseid Municipality were moved to Namdal prosti when the municipality became part of the large Namsos Municipality.

Municipality	Parish (sokn)	Church	Location	Year built	Photo
Flatanger	Flatanger	Løvøy Church	Løvøya	1871	
Flatanger	Flatanger	Vik Church	Vik	1873	
Grong	Grong	Grong Church	Medjå	1877	
Grong	Harran	Gløshaug Church	Gartland	1689	
Grong	Harran	Harran Church	Harran	1874	
Høylandet	Høylandet	Drageid Church	Vassbotna	1976	
Høylandet	Høylandet	Høylandet Church	Høylandet	1860	
Høylandet	Høylandet	Kongsmo Chapel	Kongsmoen	1937	
Leka	Leka	Leka Church	Leknes	1867	
Lierne	Nordli	Nordli Church	Sandvika	1873	
Lierne	Nordli	Tunnsjø Chapel	Tunnsjø senter	1873	
Lierne	Sørli	Sørli Church	Mebygda	1876	
Namsos	Fosnes	Dun Church	Dun	1949	
Namsos	Fosnes	Fosnes Chapel	Fosnesvågen on Jøa	1926	
Namsos	Fosnes	Lund Chapel	Lund	1965	
Namsos	Fosnes	Salen Chapel	Salsnes	1953	
Namsos	Klinga	Klinga Church	Klinga	1866	
Namsos	Namdalseid	Namdalseid Church	Namdalseid	1858	
Namsos	Namsos	Namsos Church	Namsos	1960	
Namsos	Otterøy	Otterøy Church	Otterøya	1858	
Namsos	Statland	Statland Church	Statland	1992	
Namsos	Vemundvik	Vemundvik Church	Vemundvik	1875	
Namsskogan	Namsskogan	Trones Church	Trones	1832	
Namsskogan	Namsskogan	Bjørhusdal Church	Namsskogan	1970	
Namsskogan	Namsskogan	Skorovatn Chapel	Skorovatn	1965	
Nærøysund	Nærøy	Foldereid Church	Foldereid	1863	
Nærøysund	Nærøy	Gravvik Church	Gravvika	1875	
Nærøysund	Nærøy	Kolvereid Church	Kolvereid	1874	
Nærøysund	Nærøy	Lundring Church	Lundring	1885	
Nærøysund	Nærøy	Salsbruket Chapel	Salsbruket	1950	
Nærøysund	Nærøy	Steine Chapel	Steine	1911	
Nærøysund	Nærøy	Torstad Chapel	Torstad	1936	
Nærøysund	Vikna	Garstad Church	Garstad	1856	
Nærøysund	Vikna	Rørvik Church	Rørvik	1896	
Nærøysund	Vikna	Valøy Chapel	Valøya	1972	
Overhalla	Overhalla	Ranem Church	Ranemsletta	1187	
Overhalla	Overhalla	Skage Church	Hunn	1903	
Røyrvik	Røyrvik	Røyrvik Church	Røyrvik	1828	

== Orkdal prosti ==
This deanery (Norwegian: prosti) covers the southwestern coastal part of Trøndelag county. The deanery covers the municipalities of Frøya, Heim, Hitra, Orkland, Skaun and Rindal. The deanery is headquartered at Orkdal Church in the village of Fannrem in Orkland Municipality.

The deanery was established on 20 April 1911 when the old Nordre Dalernes prosti and Søndre Dalernes prosti were dissolved and split into three new deaneries. On that date, the parishes of Orkdal, Meldal, Rennebu, and Oppdal from Søndre Dalernes prosti and the parish of Børsen from Nordre Dalernes prosti became part of the new Orkedalens prosti. A royal resolution on 19 May 1922 changed the deanery name from "Orkedal prosti" to "Orkdal prosti". In 2000, the parishes of Hitra, Frøya, and Hemne were moved from the Sør-Fosen prosti to Orkdal prosti and on the same date the parishes of Oppdal and Rennebu were moved from this deanery to the neighboring Gauldal prosti. In 2020, Rindal Municipality was moved to this deanery from the Diocese of Møre after the municipality changed counties in 2019.

Municipality	Parish (sokn)	Church	Location	Year built	Photo
Frøya	Frøya	Hallaren Church	Storhallaren	1881	
Frøya	Frøya	Sletta Church	Sletta (northern Frøya)	1990	
Frøya	Frøya	Froan Chapel	Froan	1904	
Frøya	Frøya	Måøy Chapel	Mausund	1939	
Frøya	Frøya	Sula Chapel	Sula	1925	
Frøya	Frøya	Titran Chapel	Titran	1873	
Heim	Halsa	Halsa Church	Halsanaustan	1734	
Heim	Halsa	Valsøyfjord Church	Valsøyfjord	1864	
Heim	Heim	Heim Church	Heim	1883	
Heim	Hemne	Hemne Church	Kyrksæterøra	1817	
Heim	Vinje	Vinje Church	Vinjeøra	1824	
Hitra	Hitra og Fillan	Hitra Church	Melandsjøen	1927	
Hitra	Hitra og Fillan	Dolm Church	Dolmøya	1188	
Hitra	Hitra og Fillan	Fillan Church	Fillan	1789	
Hitra	Hitra og Fillan	Nordbotn Church	Nordbotn	1900	
Hitra	Kvenvær og Sandstad	Kvenvær Church	Kvenvær	1909	
Hitra	Kvenvær og Sandstad	Forsnes Chapel	Forsnes	1935	
Hitra	Kvenvær og Sandstad	Sandstad Church	Sandstad	1888	
Orkland	Agdenes	Agdenes Church	Vernes	1857	
Orkland	Agdenes	Lensvik Church	Lensvik	1863	
Orkland	Agdenes	Ingdalen Chapel	Ingdalen	1960	
Orkland	Geitastrand	Geitastrand Church	Geitastrand	1859	
Orkland	Løkken	Løkken Church	Bjørnli	1929	
Orkland	Orkanger	Orkanger Church	Orkanger	1892	
Orkland	Orkdal	Orkdal Church	Fannrem	1893	
Orkland	Orkdal	Søvasskjølen Church	Svorksjødalen	1981	
Orkland	Orkland	Moe Church	Vormstad	1867	
Orkland	Meldal	Meldal Church	Meldal	1988	
Orkland	Snillfjord	Snillfjord Church	Krokstadøra	1898	
Rindal	Rindal	Rindal Church	Rindal	1874	
Rindal	Rindal	Øvre Rindal Chapel	Tiset	1911	
Skaun	Skaun	Skaun Church	Skaun	1183	
Skaun	Buvik	Buvik Church	Buvika	1819	
Skaun	Børsa	Børsa Church	Børsa	1857	

== Stiklestad prosti ==
This deanery (Norwegian: prosti) covers the Innherad district in central Trøndelag county. The deanery includes the municipalities of Snåsa, Steinkjer, Inderøy, Verdal, Levanger, and Frosta. The deanery is headquartered at Stiklestad Church in the village of Stiklestad in Verdal Municipality.

The deanery was established on 1 January 2019 when the old Nord-Innherad prosti and Sør-Innherad prosti were merged. The old Sør-Innherad prosti included the parishes in Verdal Municipality, Levanger Municipality, and Frosta Municipality and the Nord-Innherad prosti included the parishes in Snåsa Municipality, Steinkjer Municipality, Inderøy Municipality, Verran Municipality (now part of Steinkjer Municipality), and Namdalseid Municipality. Namdalseid Municipality was merged into Namsos Municipality in 2020 and so it was transferred to the Namdal prosti. Sør-Innherad prosti was based at Stiklestad, just like the new Stiklestad deanery. The old Nord-Innherad prosti was headquartered at Steinkjer Church in the town of Steinkjer in Steinkjer Municipality.

Municipality	Parish (sokn)	Church	Location	Year built	Photo
Inderøy	Inderøy	Sakshaug Church	Straumen	1871	
Inderøy	Inderøy	Old Sakshaug Church	Sakshaug	c. 1150	
Inderøy	Røra	Salberg Church	Røra	1715	
Inderøy	Sandvollan	Heggstad Church	Heggstad, near Gangstadhaugen	1887	
Inderøy	Sandvollan	Hustad Church	Gangstad	1150	
Inderøy	Mosvik	Mosvik Church	Mosvik	1884	
Inderøy	Mosvik	Vestvik Church	Framverran	1905	
Snåsa	Snåsa	Snåsa Church	Snåsa	1200	
Steinkjer	Beitstad	Beitstad Church	Beitstad	1869	
Steinkjer	Beitstad	Bartnes Church	Bartnes	1960	
Steinkjer	Egge	Egge Church	Egge in Steinkjer	1767	
Steinkjer	Følling	Følling Church	Følling	1726	
Steinkjer	Henning	Henning Church	Vekre	1872	
Steinkjer	Kvam	Kvam Church	Kvam	1878	
Steinkjer	Malm	Malm Church	Malm	1885	
Steinkjer	Malm	Sela Church	Sela	1997	
Steinkjer	Mære	Mære Church	Mære	c. 1150	
Steinkjer	Ogndal	Skei Church	Skei	1664	
Steinkjer	Ogndal	Bodom Church	Bodom	1905	
Steinkjer	Steinkjer	Steinkjer Church	Steinkjer	1965	
Steinkjer	Stod	For Church	Stod	1846	
Steinkjer	Verran	Follafoss Church	Follafoss	1954	
Frosta	Frosta	Frosta Church	Frosta	1866	
Frosta	Frosta	Logtun Church (Historic church)	Logtun	1500s	
Levanger	Alstadhaug	Alstadhaug Church	Alstadhaug	1180	
Levanger	Ekne	Ekne Church	Ekne	1893	
Levanger	Levanger	Levanger Church	Levanger	1902	
Levanger	Levanger	Bamberg Church	Levanger	1998	
Levanger	Markabygd	Markabygda Church	Markabygd	1887	
Levanger	Okkenhaug	Okkenhaug Chapel	Okkenhaug	1893	
Levanger	Ytterøy	Ytterøy Church	Ytterøya	1890	
Levanger	Åsen	Åsen Church	Åsen	1904	
Verdal	Stiklestad	Stiklestad Church	Stiklestad	1180	
Verdal	Stiklestad	Verdalsøra Chapel	Verdalsøra	1969	
Verdal	Vera og Vuku	Vera Church	Vera	1899	
Verdal	Vera og Vuku	Vuku Church	Vuku	1655	
Verdal	Vinne	Vinne Church	Vinne	1817	

== Stjørdal prosti ==
This deanery (Norwegian: prosti) covers the traditional district of Stjørdalen in eastern Trøndelag county. The deanery includes the parishes in the municipalities of Stjørdal, Meråker, Malvik, Selbu, and Tydal. The deanery is headquartered at Værnes Church in the village of Prestmoen, just south of Stjørdalshalsen in Stjørdal Municipality.

Stjørdal prosti was created in 1920 when the parishes of Øvre Stjørdal, Nedre Stjørdal, Frosta, and Leksvik were separated from the large Søndre Indherred prosti. In 1965, the parish of Leksvik was transferred to the neighboring Fosen prosti and the parish of Selbu was transferred to Stjørdal prosti from the neighboring Strinda prosti. On 1 July 1999, the parish of Frosta was transferred from Stjørdal prosti to the neighboring Sør-Innherad prosti. In 2000, the parish of Malvik was transferred from Strinda prosti to Stjørdal prosti.

Municipality	Parish (sokn)	Church	Location	Year built	Photo
Malvik	Hommelvik	Hommelvik Church	Hommelvik	1886	
Malvik	Hommelvik	Mostadmark Chapel	Sneisen	1986	
Malvik	Malvik	Malvik Church	Malvik	1846	
Meråker	Meråker	Meråker Church	Meråker	1874	
Meråker	Meråker	Kopperå Chapel	Kopperå	1936	
Meråker	Meråker	Stordalen Chapel	Stordalen	1863	
Selbu	Selbu	Selbu Church	Mebonden	1150	
Selbu	Selbu	Selbustrand Church	Selbustrand	1901	
Selbu	Selbu	Flora Chapel	Flora	1936	
Stjørdal	Hegra	Hegra Church	Hegra	1783	
Stjørdal	Hegra	Flora Chapel	Flornes	1902	
Stjørdal	Hegra	Okkelberg Chapel	Skjelstadmarka	1905	
Stjørdal	Lånke	Lånke Church	Lånke	1899	
Stjørdal	Lånke	Elvran Church	Elvran	1893	
Stjørdal	Skatval	Skatval Church	Skatval	1901	
Stjørdal	Stjørdal	Værnes Church	Prestmoen	1100	
Tydal	Tydal	Tydal Church	Aunet	1696	
Tydal	Tydal	Stugudal Chapel	Stugudalen	1957	

== Strinda prosti ==
This deanery (Norwegian: prosti) covers the eastern part of Trondheim Municipality; containing a total of five parishes. The deanery is headquartered at Strinda Church in the village of Strinda.

The deanery was established on 20 April 1911 when the old Nordre Dalernes prosti and Søndre Dalernes prosti were dissolved and split into three new deaneries. The parish of Melhus became part of Orkdal prosti and the parish of Børsen became part of Orkdal prosti and the remaining parishes from Nordre Dalernes prosti became part of the new Strinda prosti. In 1965, the parish of Selbu was from Strinda prosti to the neighboring Stjørdal prosti. In 2000, the parish of Malvik was transferred from Strinda prosti to Stjørdal prosti.

Municipality	Parish (sokn)	Church	Location	Year built	Photo
Trondheim	Berg	Berg Church	Berg	1972	
Trondheim	Nidelven	Bratsberg Church	Bratsberg	1850	
Trondheim	Nidelven	Hoeggen Church	Lerkendal	1997	
Trondheim	Nidelven	Tempe Church	Lerkendal	1960	
Trondheim	Ranheim og Charlottenlund	Ranheim Church	Ranheim	1933	
Trondheim	Ranheim og Charlottenlund	Charlottenlund Church	Charlottenlund	1973	
Trondheim	Strinda	Strinda Church	Strinda	1900	
Trondheim	Strindheim	Strindheim Church	Strindheim	1979	
