= Tryne Point =

Headland in Antarctica

Tryne Point (67°18′S 59°3′E) is a rocky point at the east extremity of Law Promontory in Antarctica, forming the west side of the entrance of Stefansson Bay. Charted by Norwegian cartographers from aerial photographs taken by the Norwegian expedition under Christensen in January–February 1937, and named Trynet, a Norwegian word meaning "the snout." The form Tryne, dropping the definite article, is approved with the added generic term point.

== See also ==
- Blackrock Head
