= Havstein Island =

Island in Antarctica

- Location within Antarctica

Geography
- Location: Antarctica
- Coordinates: 67°7′S 58°45′E
- Length: 6 km (3.7 mi)
- Width: 4 km (2.5 mi)

Administration
- Administered under the Antarctic Treaty System

Demographics
- Population: Uninhabited

Havstein Island is a rocky island, 6 km (3 nmi) long and 4 km (2 nmi) wide, situated 3 km (1.5 nmi) north of Law Promontory and 2 km (1 nmi) east of Broka Island, in Antarctica. It was mapped by Norwegian cartographers from aerial photographs taken by the Lars Christensen Expedition, 1936–37, and named Havstein (sea stone), probably because of its rocky nature and its seaward position.

== See also ==
- List of Antarctic and sub-Antarctic islands
