= Havstein Church =

Church in Trøndelag, Norway

- Havstein kirke
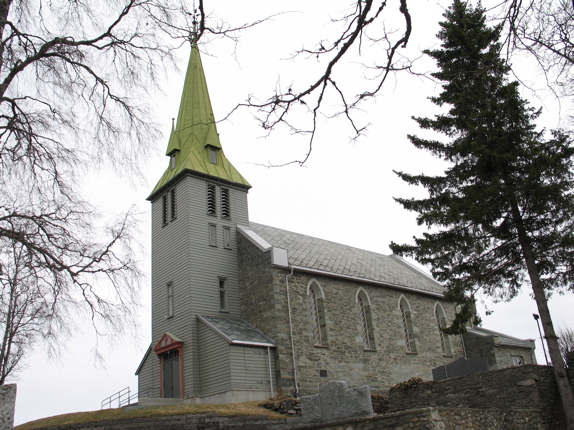
- View of the church
- Havstein Church
- 63.4048847225°N 10.370785296°E
- Location: Trondheim Municipality, Trøndelag
- Country: Norway
- Denomination: Church of Norway
- Churchmanship: Evangelical Lutheran

History
- Status: Parish church
- Founded: 1857
- Consecrated: 30 November 1857

Architecture
- Functional status: Active
- Architect: Heinrich Ernst Schirmer
- Architectural type: Long church
- Style: Neo-Gothic
- Completed: 1857 (169 years ago)

Specifications
- Capacity: 200
- Materials: Stone

Administration
- Diocese: Nidaros bispedømme
- Deanery: Heimdal og Byåsen
- Parish: Sverresborg
- Norwegian Cultural Heritage Site
- Type: Church
- Status: Listed
- ID: 84510

Havstein Church (Norwegian: Havstein kirke) is a parish church of the Church of Norway in Trondheim Municipality in Trøndelag county, Norway. It is located in the Sverresborg area on the western side of the Nidelva river in the city of Trondheim. It is one of the churches for the Sverresborg parish which is part of the Heimdal og Byåsen prosti (deanery) in the Diocese of Nidaros. The gray, stone church was built in a long church style in 1857 and designed by the architects Heinrich Ernst Schirmer and Wilhelm von Hanno. The church seats about 200 people.

== History ==
Havstein cemetery was consecrated on 14 August 1854 to serve the western part of the city. Soon after, a church was built beside the cemetery. The church was consecrated on 30 November 1857. The church was originally built as an annex for Strinda Church, the main church for the parish. The neo-Gothic, stone church was built in a long church style and designed by the architects Heinrich Ernst Schirmer and Wilhelm von Hanno. The altarpiece was designed in 1863 by sculptor Ole Laulo (1825–1901). In 1900, the original tower on the roof of the nave was removed and a new wooden tower was built on the west side of the building. The tower was designed by architect Erik Selnes. In 1926, a baptismal sacristy was built on the south side and the whole church got a new roof. The stained glass in the church is from 1968 and was made by artist Carsten Lien (1894–1970).

== Media gallery ==
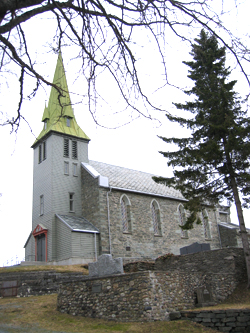

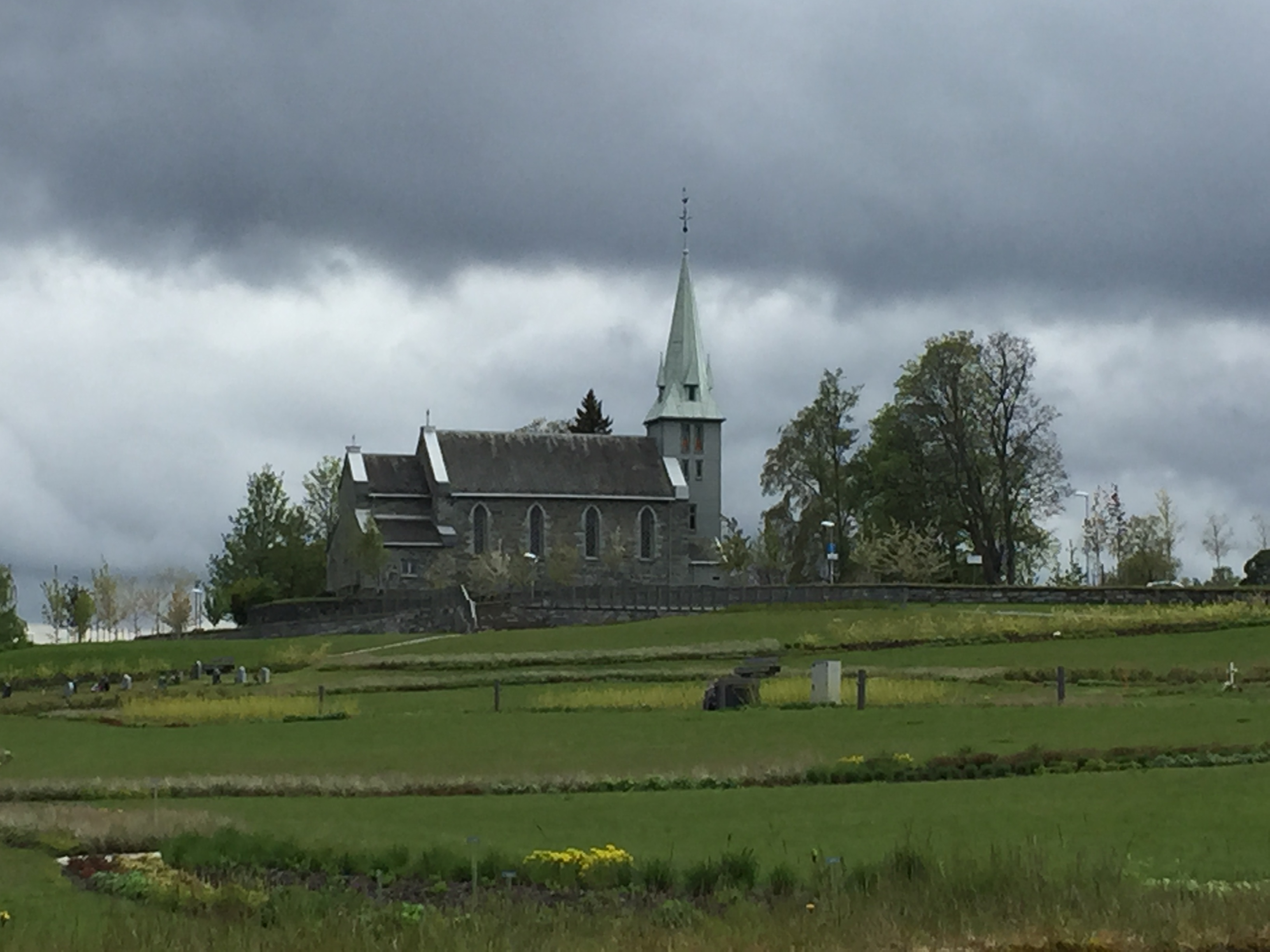

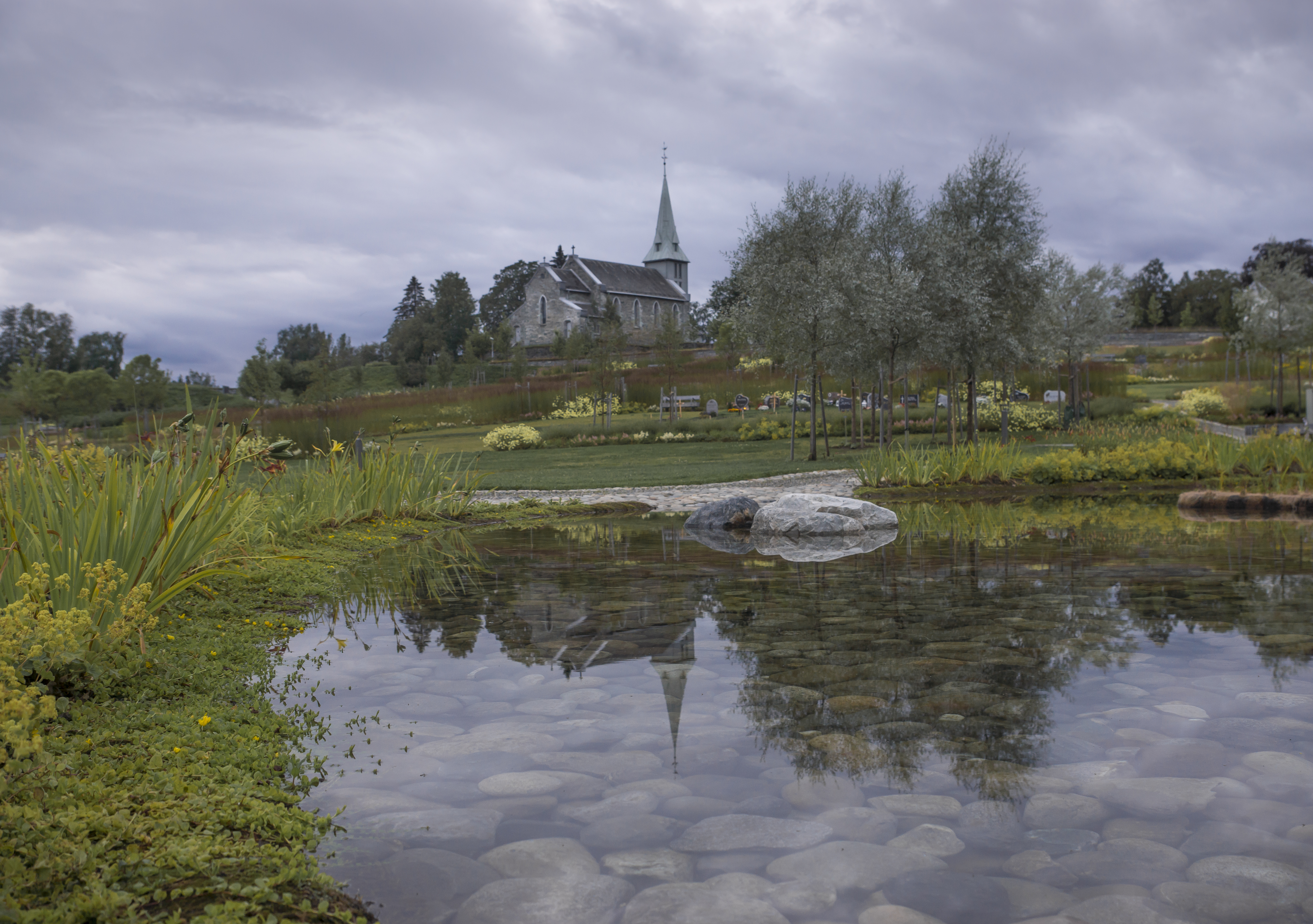

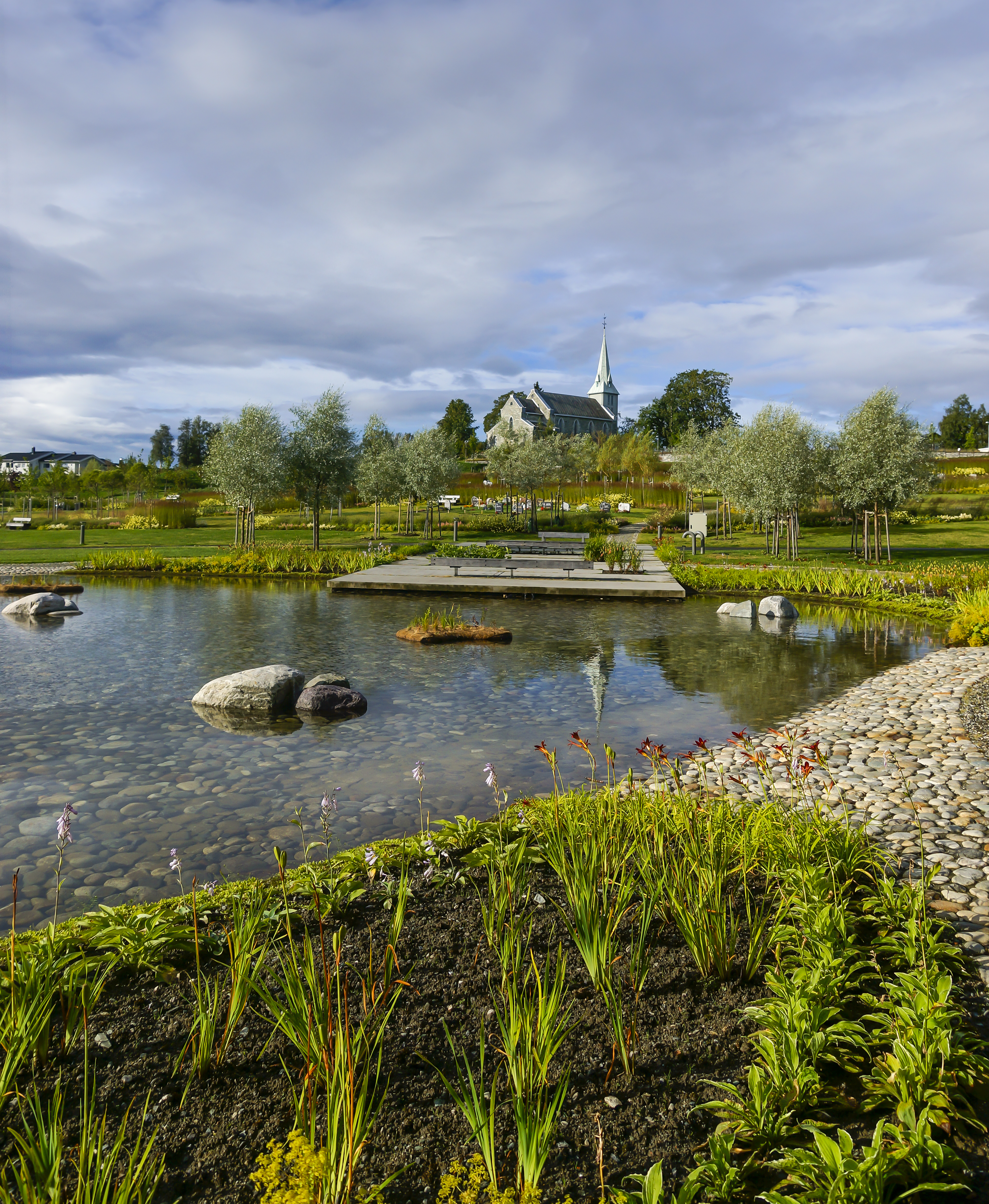

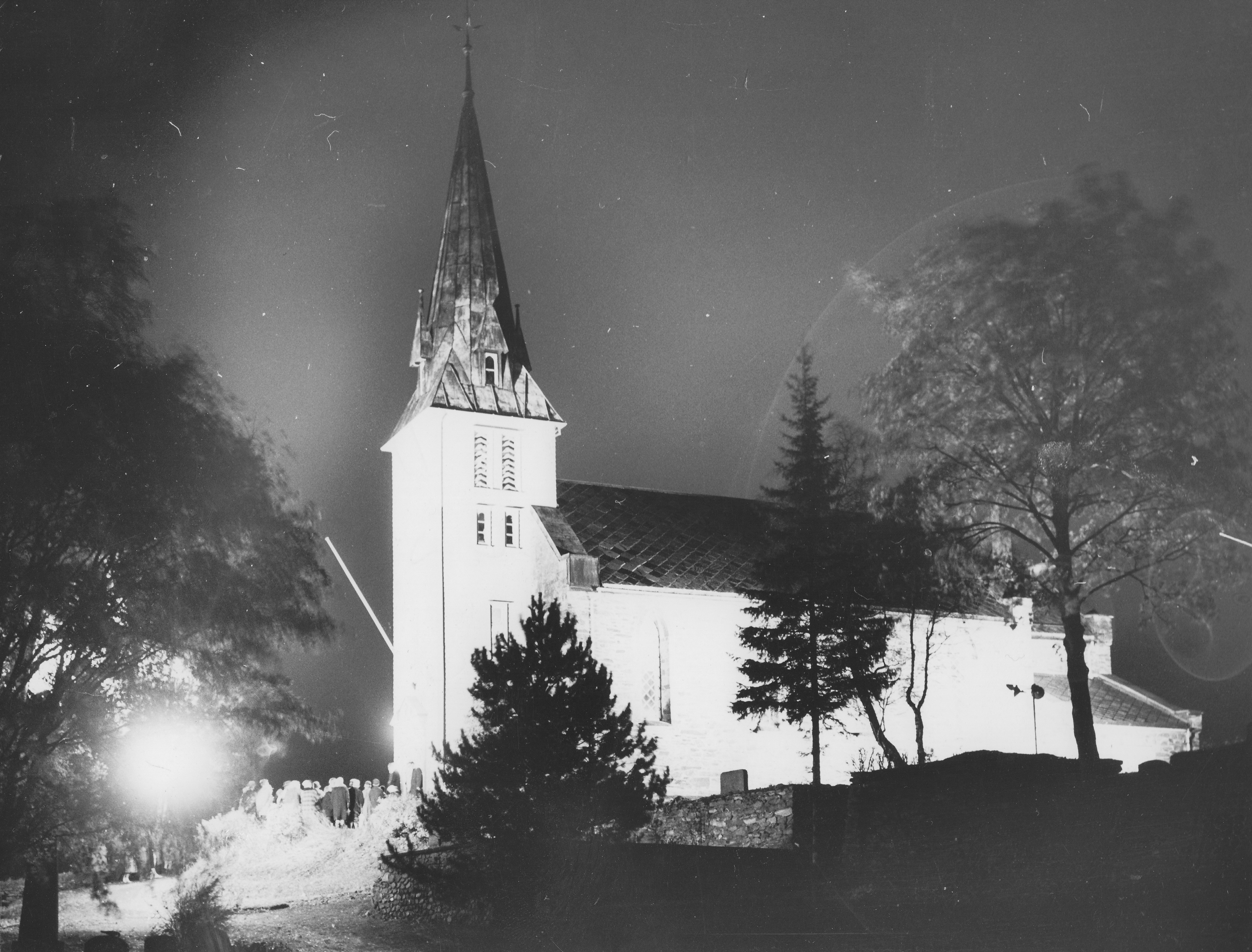

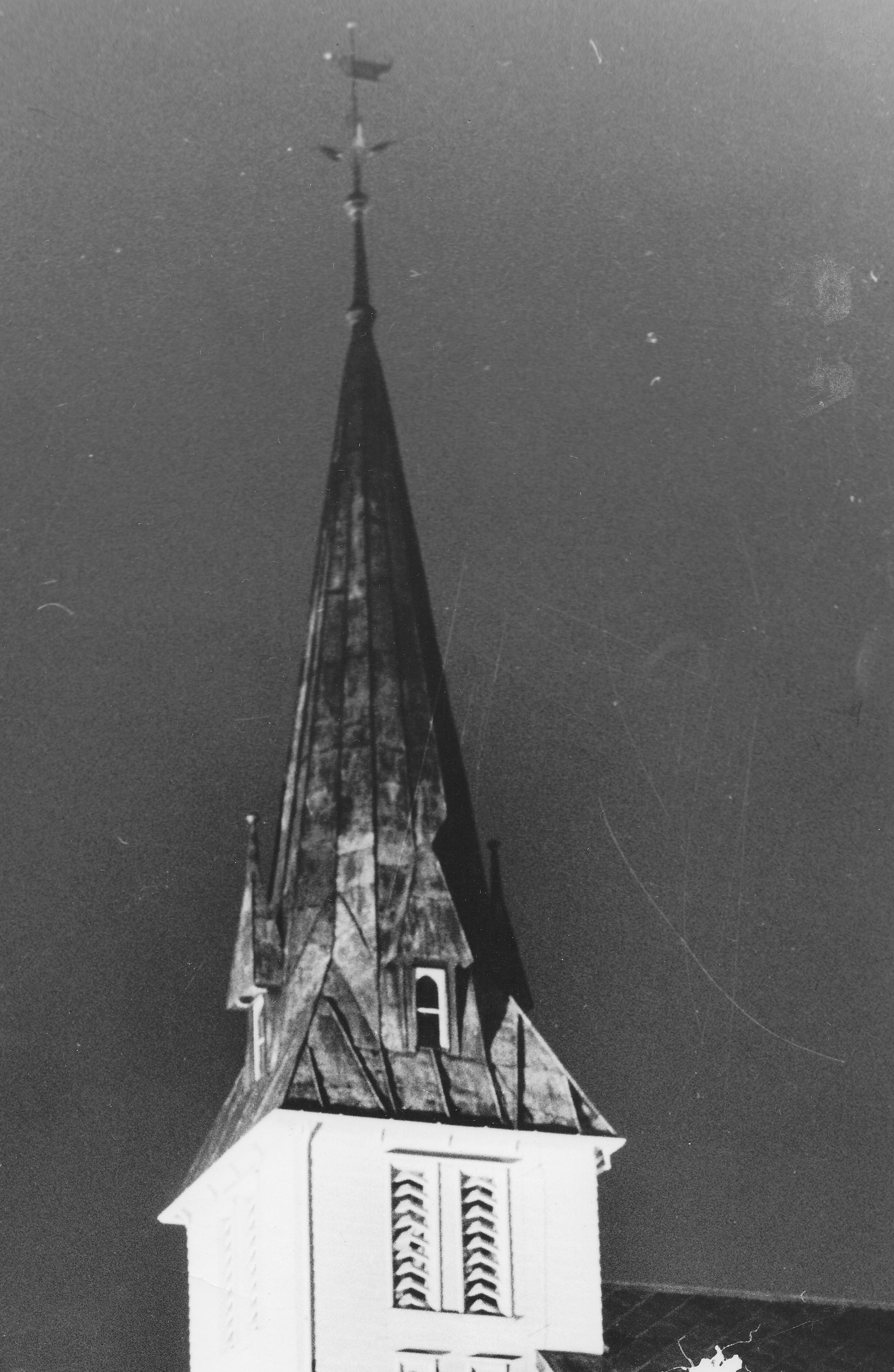

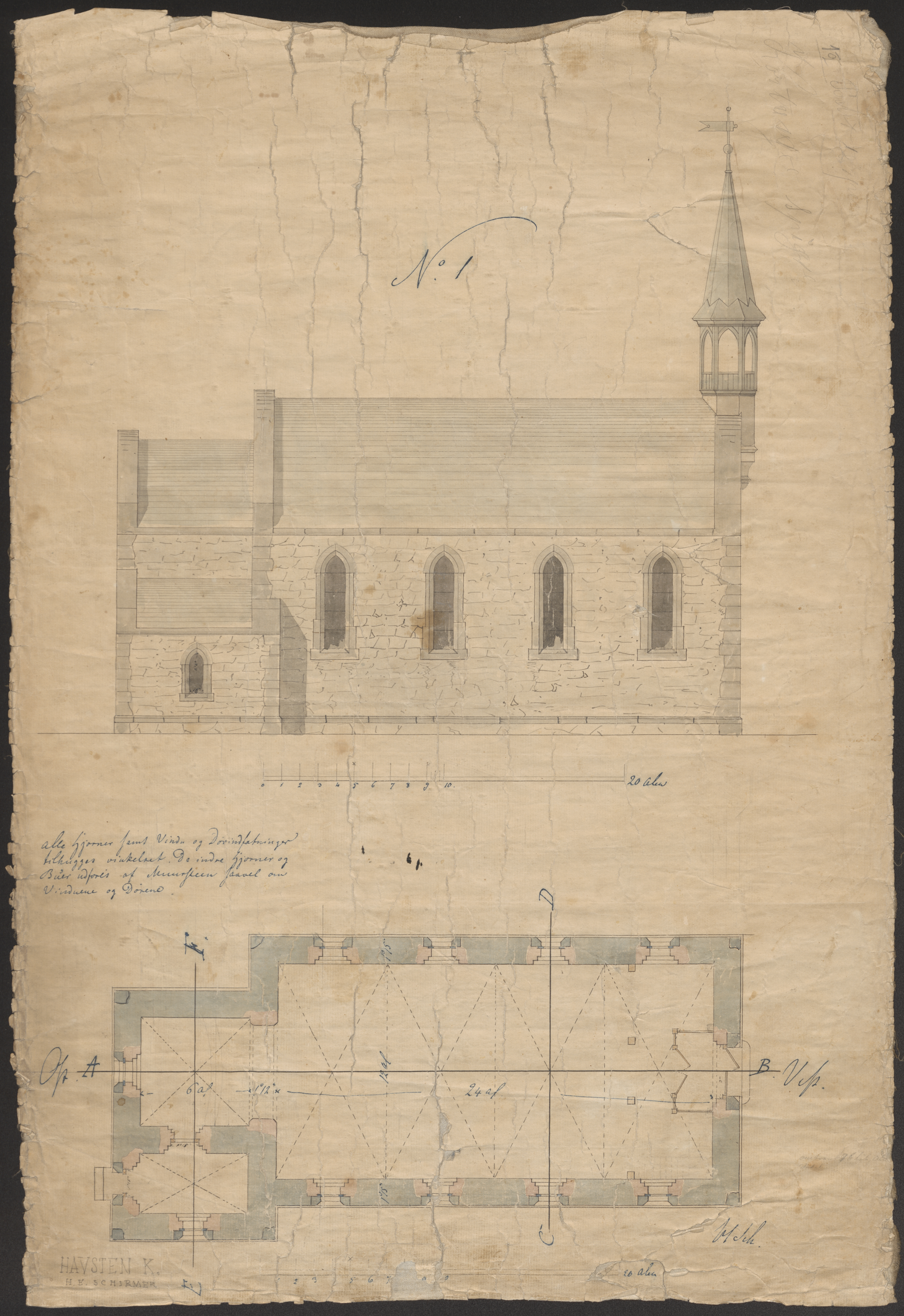

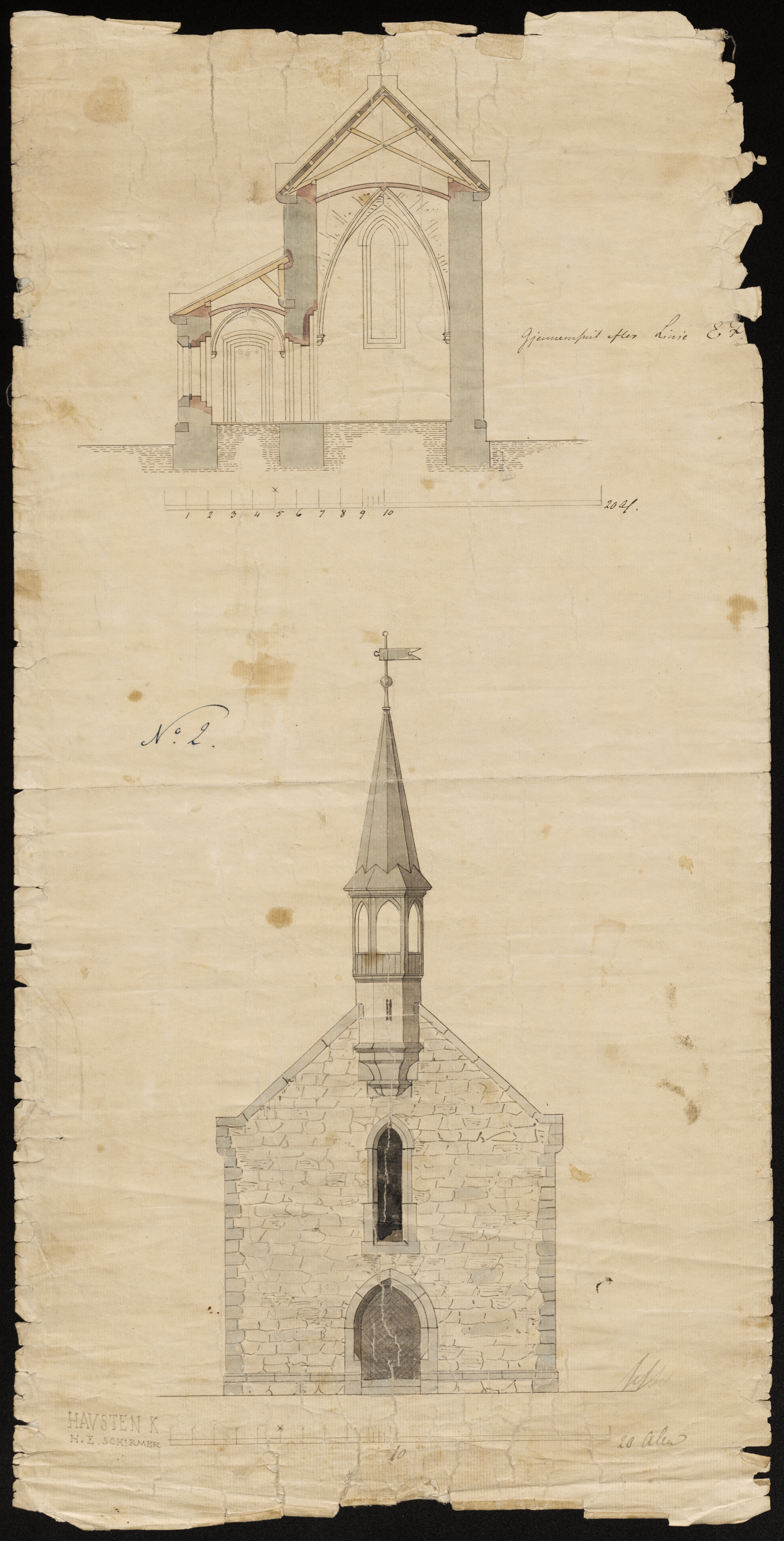

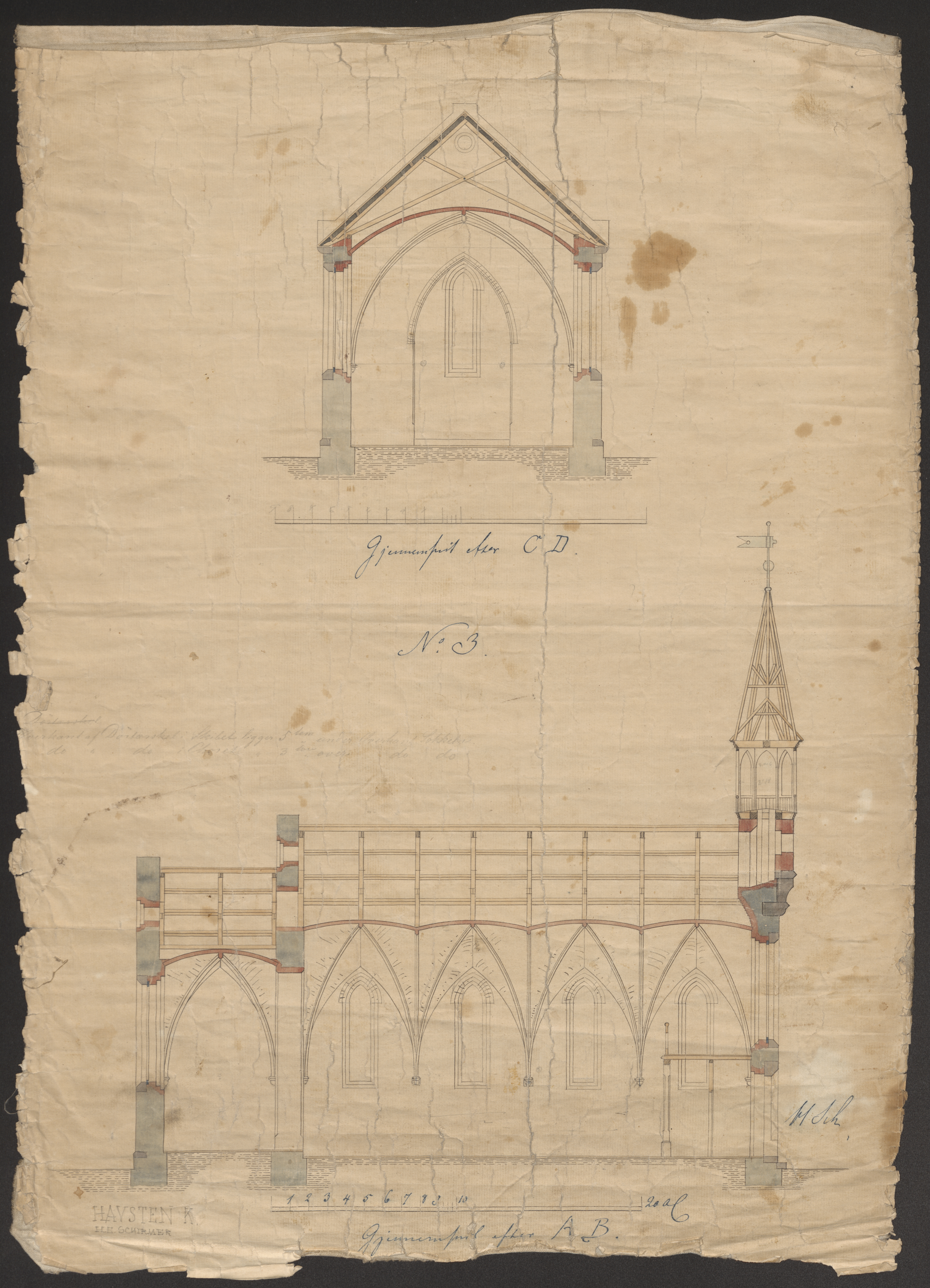

== See also ==
- List of churches in Nidaros
