= Strinda Church =

Church in Trøndelag, Norway

- Strinda kirke
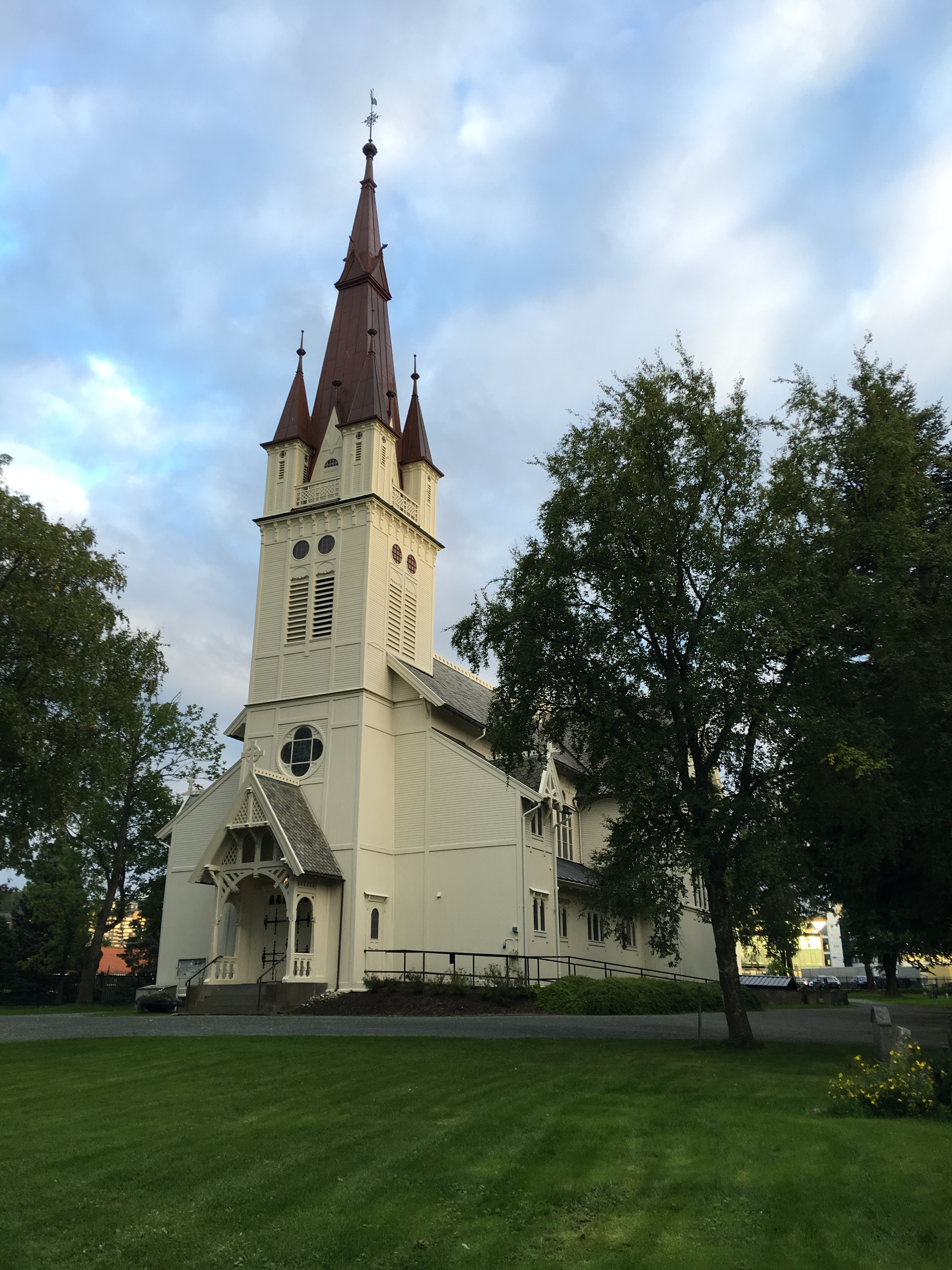
- View of the church
- Strinda Church
- 63.4131420114°N 10.4443609717°E
- Location: Trondheim Municipality, Trøndelag
- Country: Norway
- Denomination: Church of Norway
- Churchmanship: Evangelical Lutheran

History
- Former name: Moholt kirke
- Status: Parish church
- Founded: 1900
- Consecrated: 18 Oct 1900

Architecture
- Functional status: Active
- Architect(s): Lars Solberg and Johan Christensen
- Architectural type: Long church
- Style: Neo-Gothic
- Completed: 1900 (126 years ago)

Specifications
- Capacity: 300
- Materials: Wood

Administration
- Diocese: Nidaros bispedømme
- Deanery: Strinda prosti
- Parish: Strinda
- Norwegian Cultural Heritage Site
- Type: Church
- Status: Listed
- ID: 85605

Strinda Church (Norwegian: Strinda kirke, historically Moholt kirke) is a parish church of the Church of Norway in Trondheim Municipality in Trøndelag county, Norway. It is located in the Strinda area in the city of Trondheim. It is the church for the Strinda parish which is part of the Strinda prosti (deanery) in the Diocese of Nidaros. The white, wooden church was built in a cruciform design with a Neo-Gothic style in 1900 using plans drawn up by the architects Lars Solberg and Johan Christensen. The church seats about 300 people.

== History ==
The church in Strinda was originally built in 1900 to be the new main church for Strinda Municipality. The medieval Lade Church had held that position for a long time, but that church was too small for the parish. It was designed by the architects Lars Solberg and Johan Christensen. It was built for about 35,000 kr by the carpenter O.A. Henriksen. The building was consecrated on 18 October 1900. The church was built with a cruciform design, but its interior is set up like that of a long church due to the fairly short transept, hence everyone is sitting facing the same direction whereas in a traditional cruciform design, the people sitting in the transepts are facing each other and the chancel is to their side. Due to a slightly weak construction, the church began creaking loudly during a storm and afterwards when it was windy you were hear it. Around 1922-1923, iron bars were threaded through the church to strengthen the structure and prevent the noise. In 1935, the building was painted a very dark brown color that almost looked black, and this was not well received by the congregation (photo of the dark color). Just after World War II, the church was re-painted white once again.

== Media gallery ==
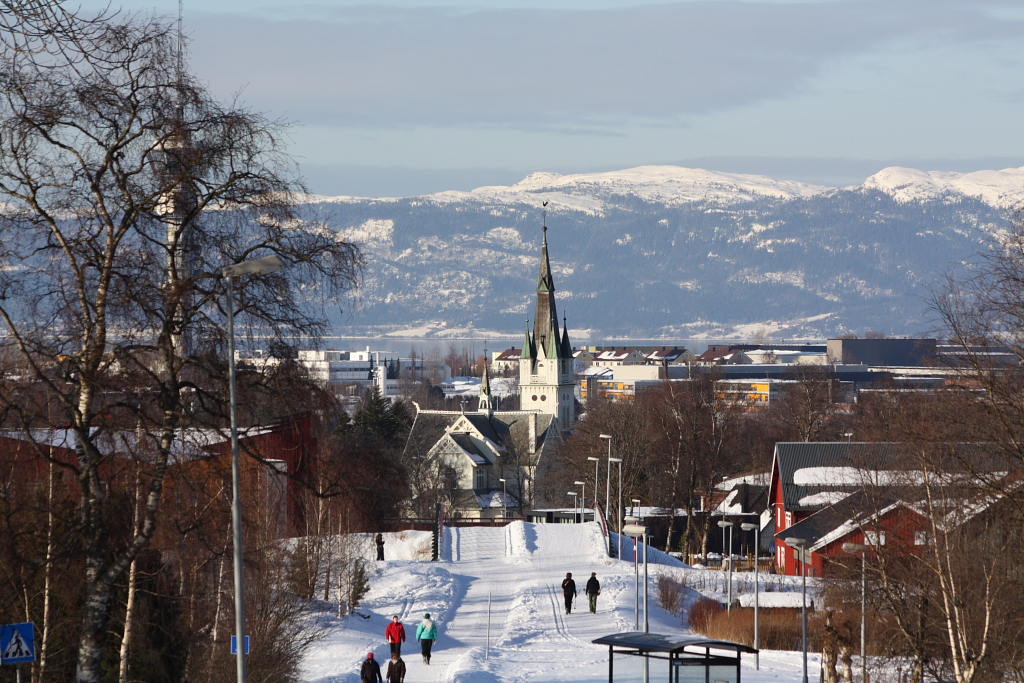

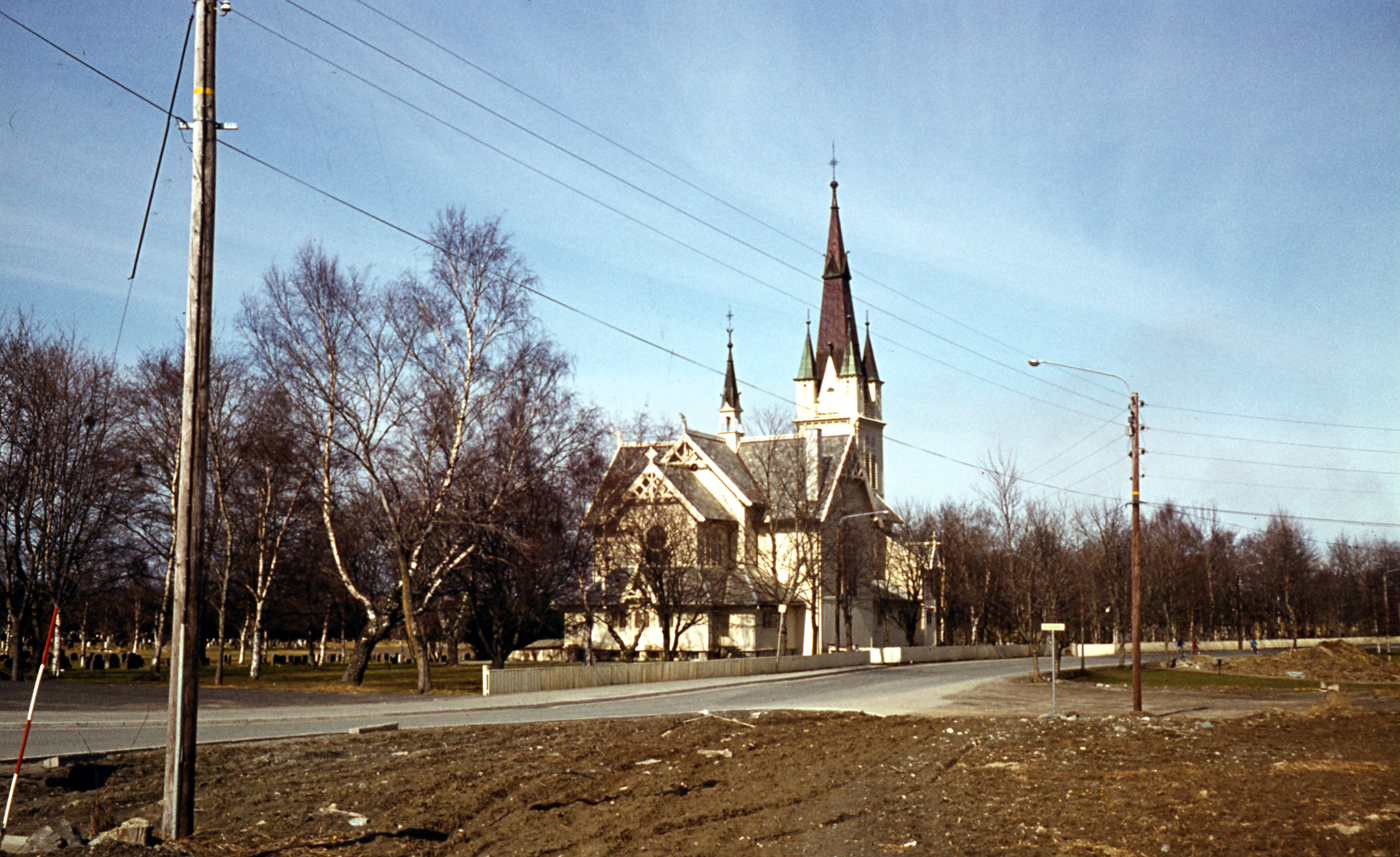

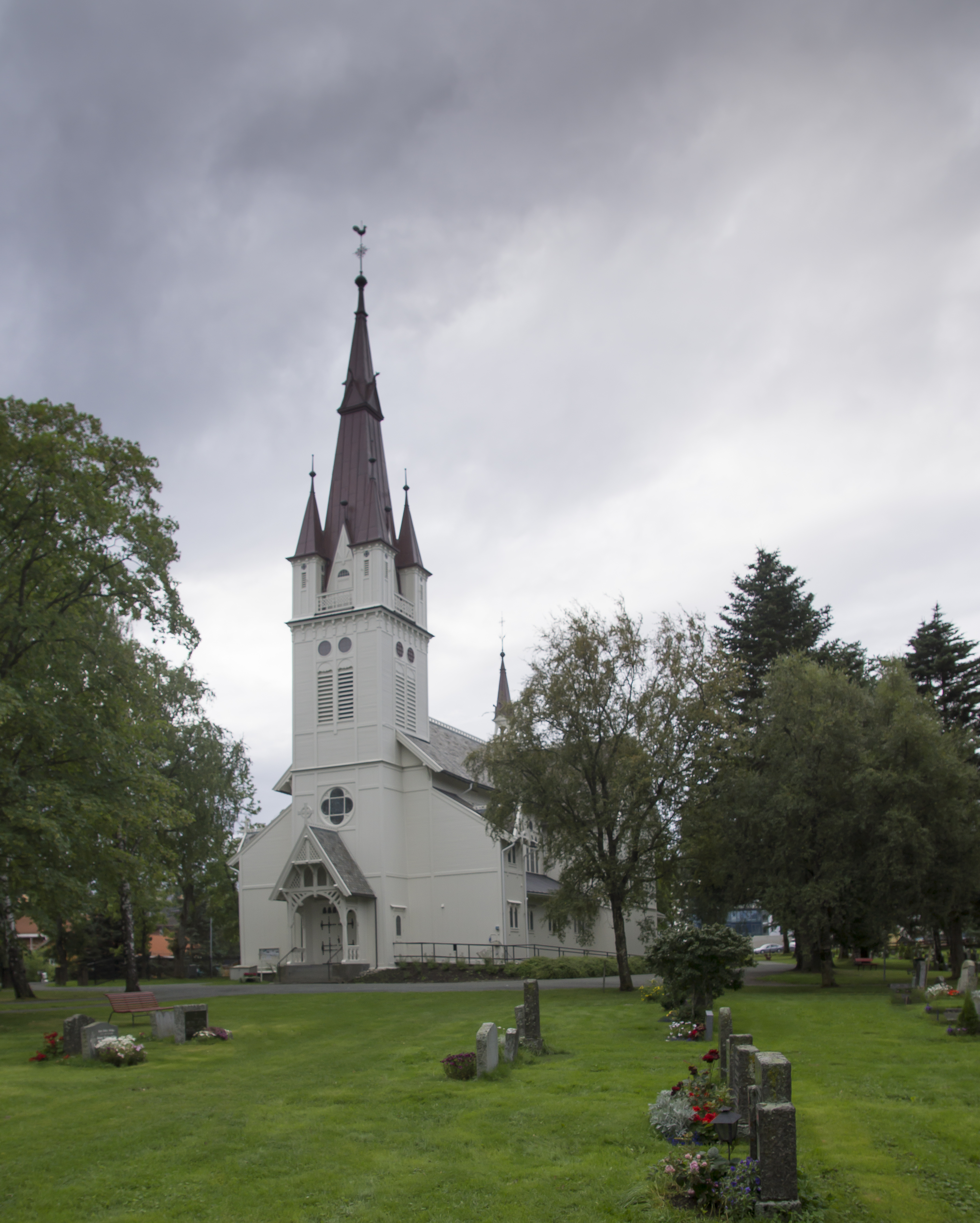

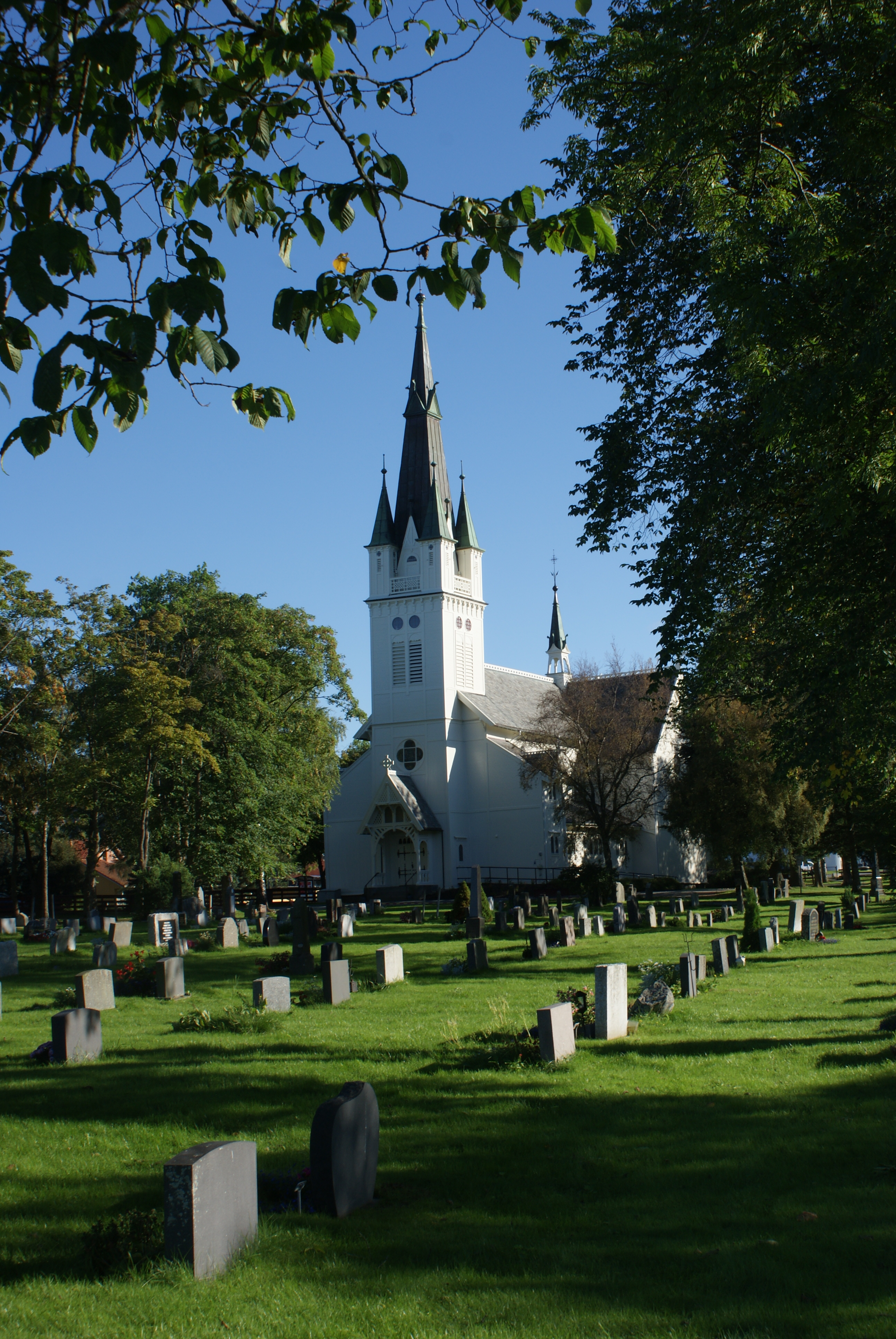

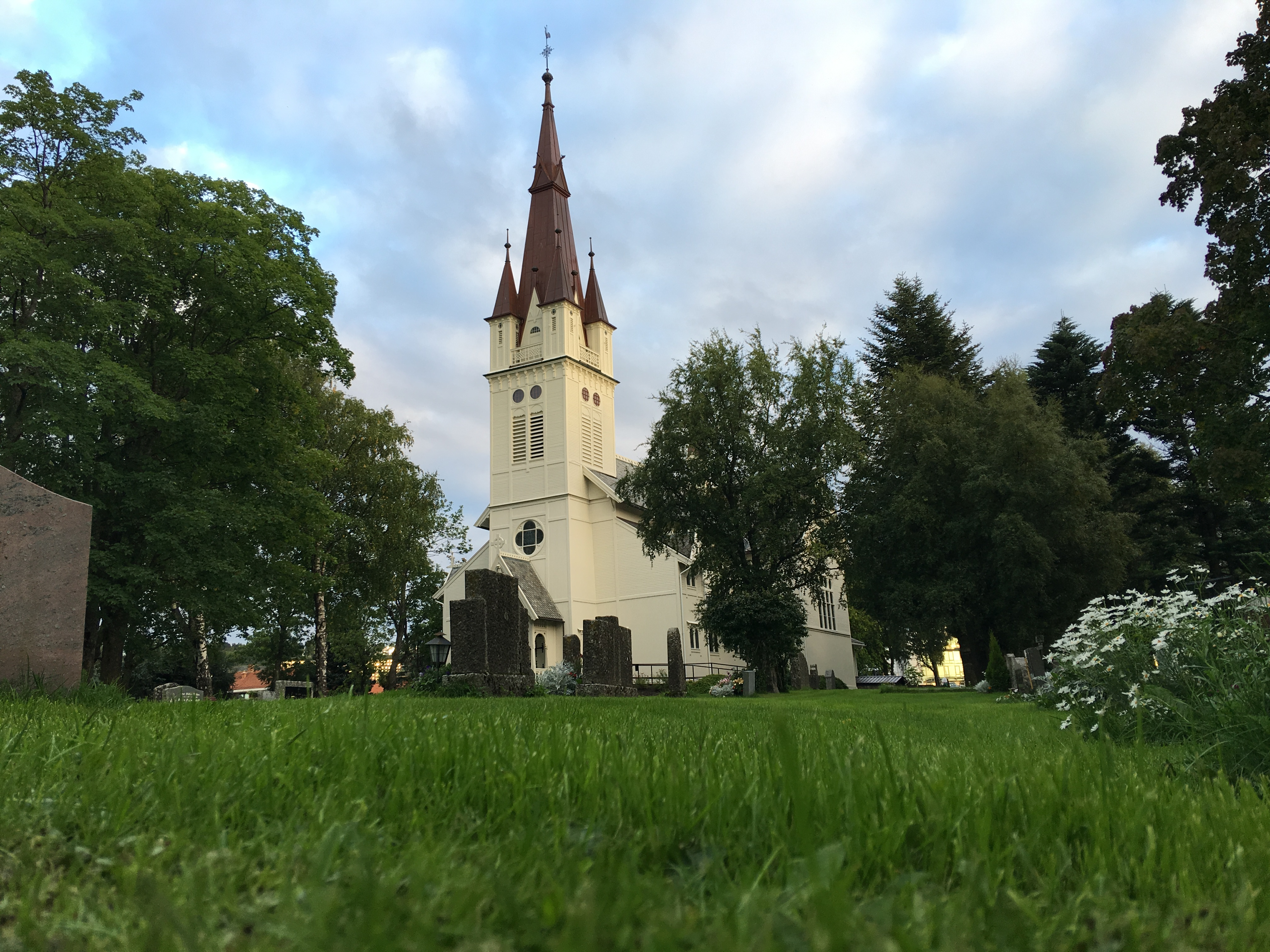

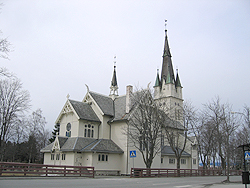

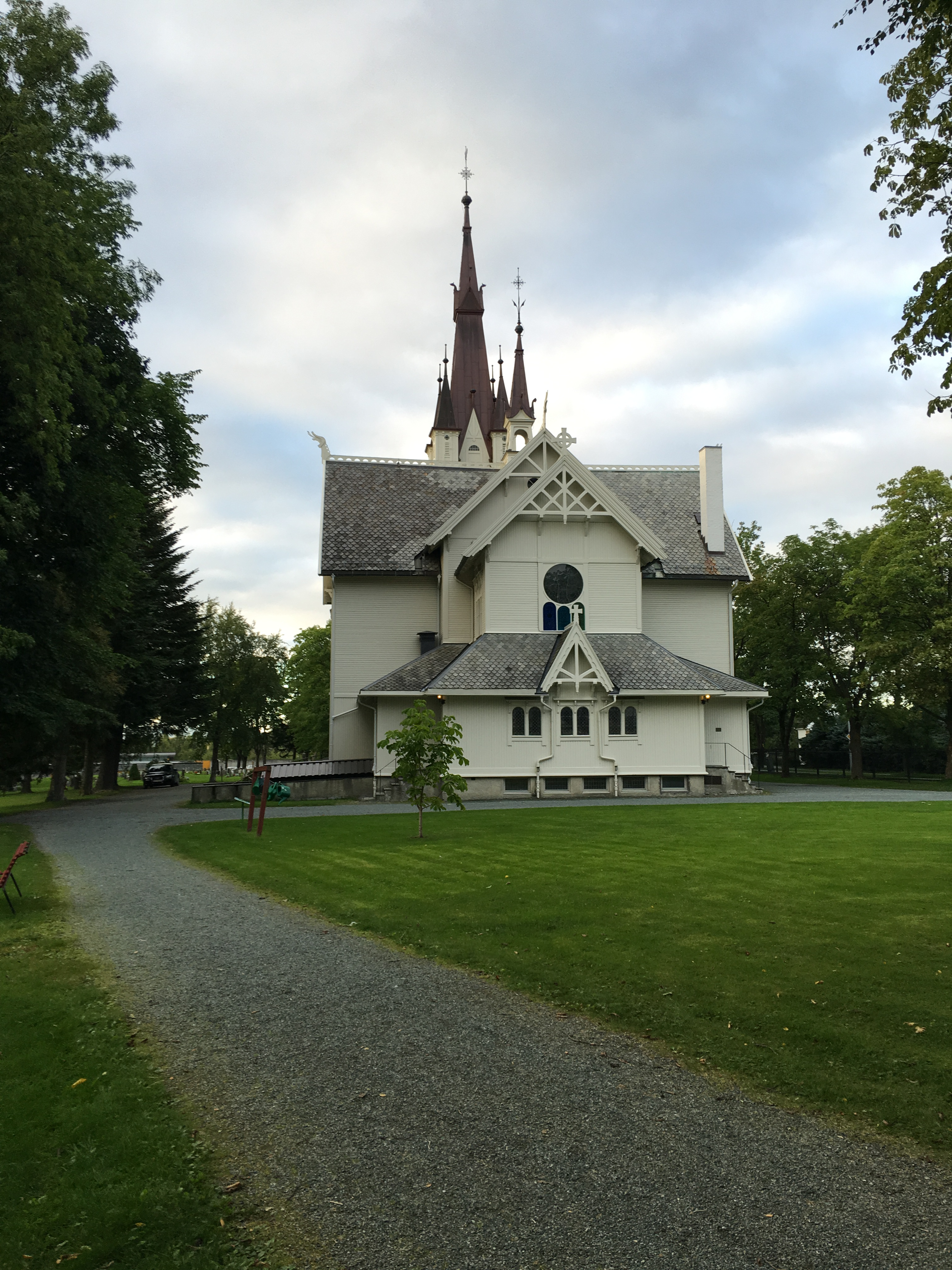

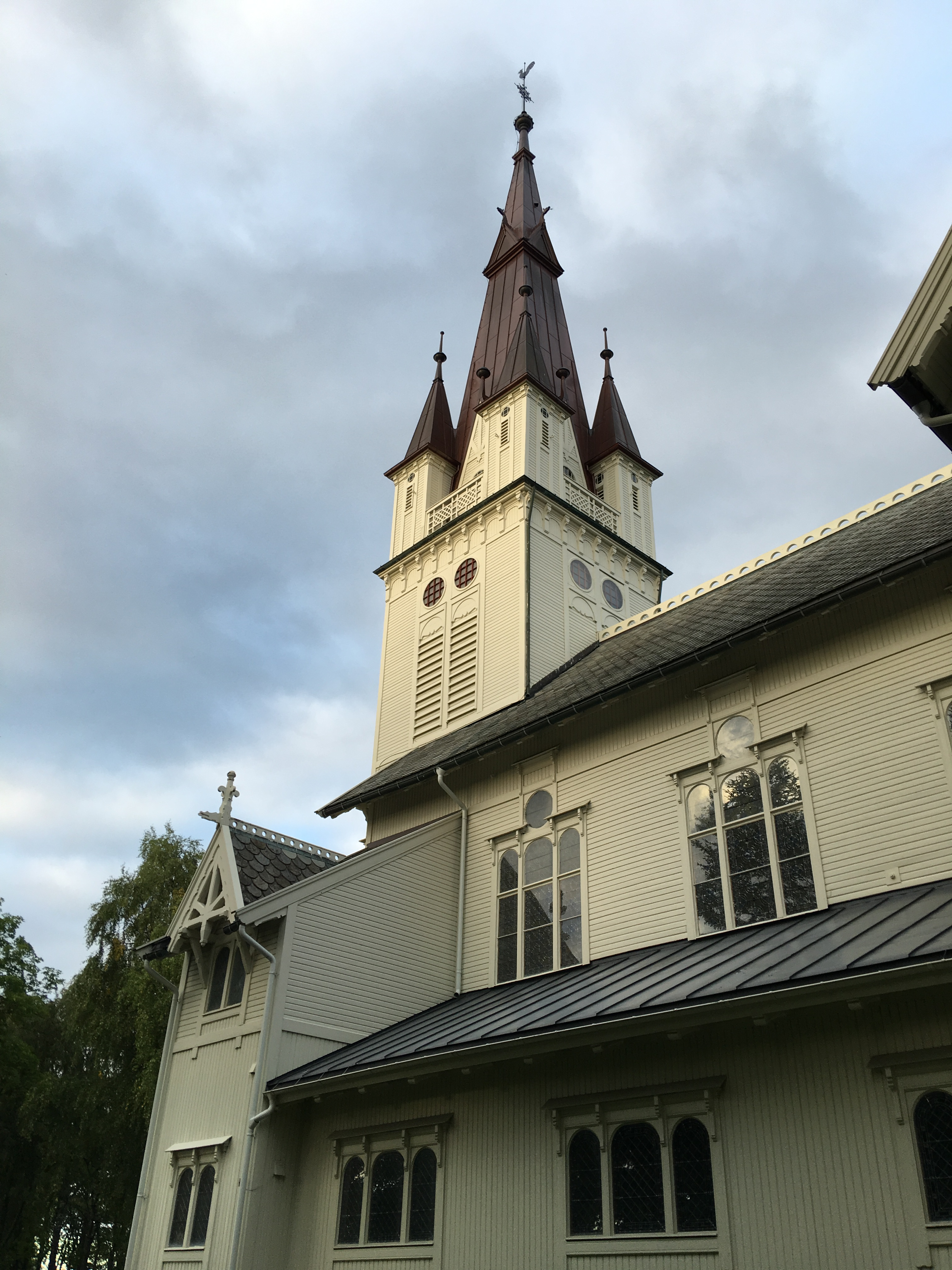

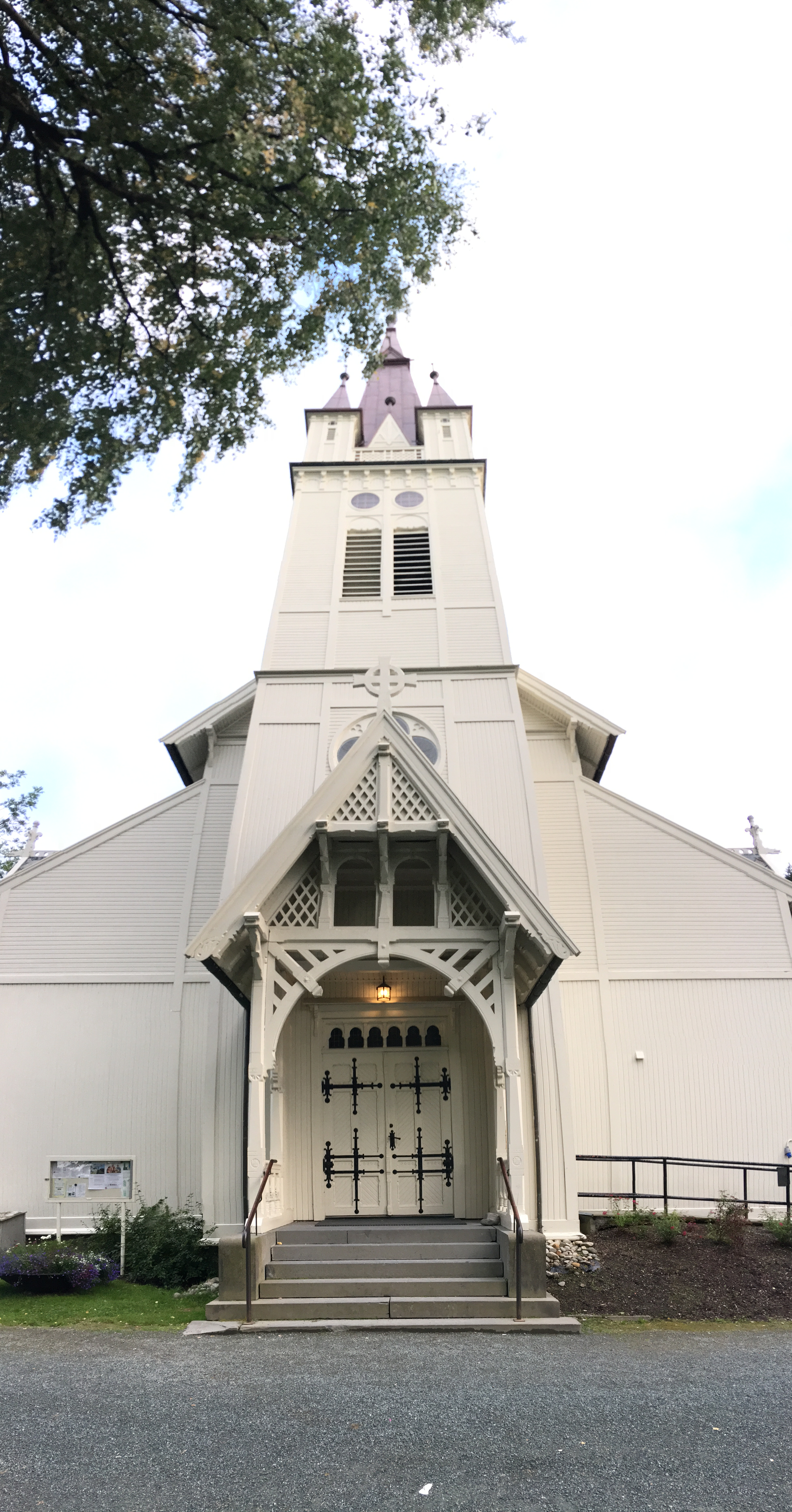

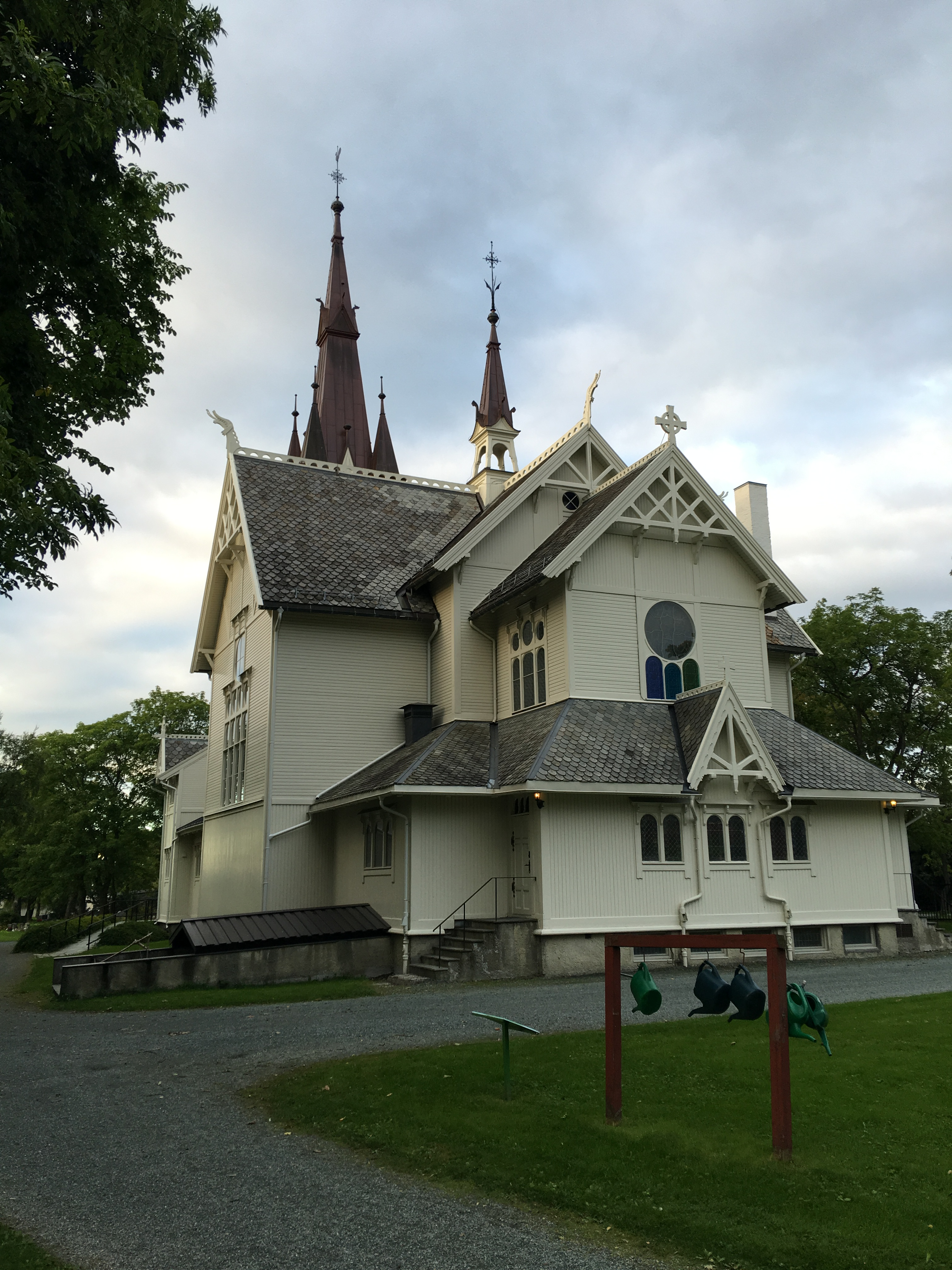

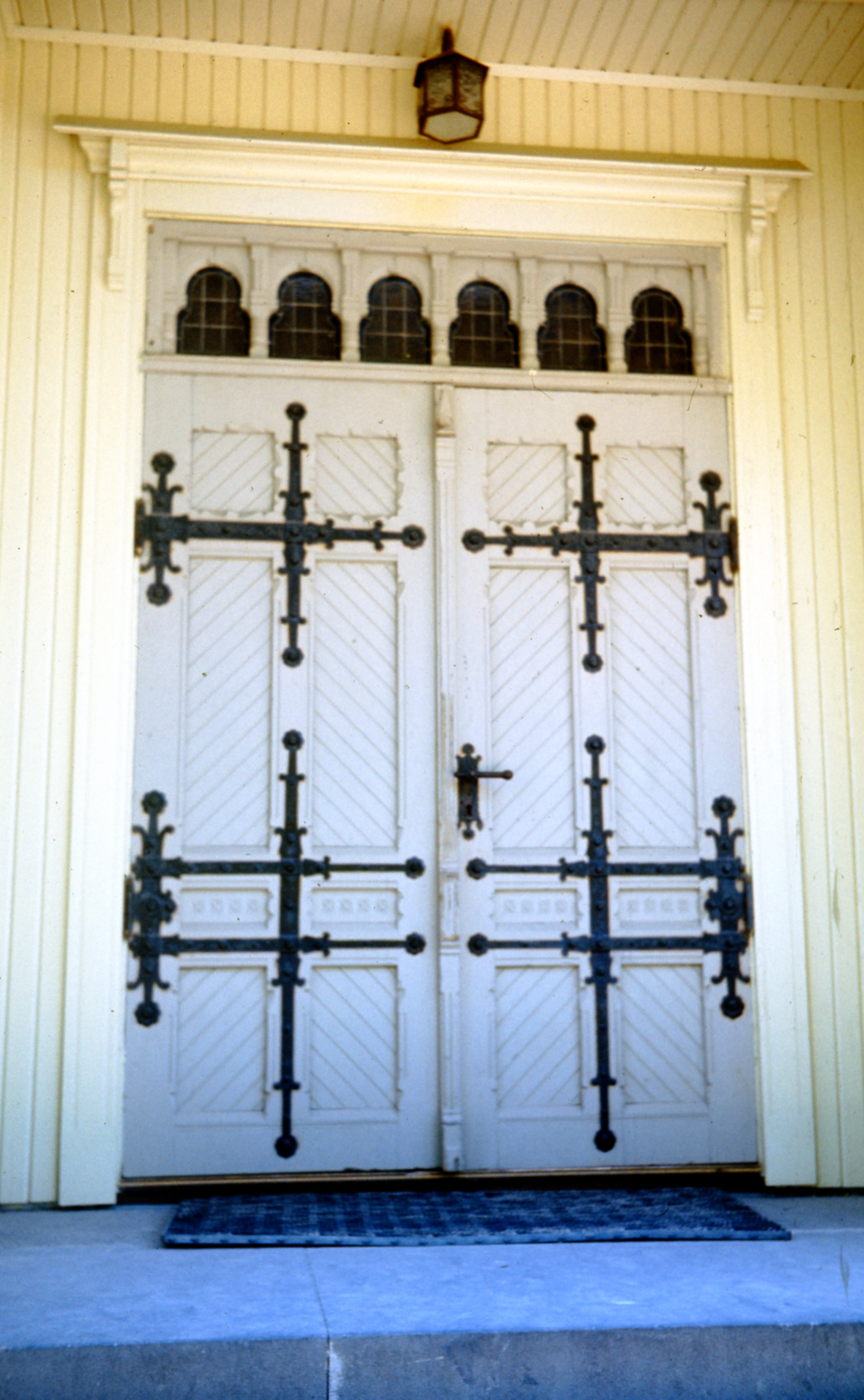

== See also ==
- List of churches in Nidaros
