= Law Promontory =

Promontory in Antarctica

Coordinates: 67.22°S 58.80°E

Law Promontory in Antarctica was named after Phillip Law, who flew over and photographed this feature in February 1954.

The promontory is about 28 kilometres (17 mi) long, situated just west and north-west of Stefansson Bay. This feature appears to have been first mapped with an accuracy by William Scoresby in February 1936. It was photographed from the air by the Lars Christensen Expedition (1936–37) and subsequently plotted on the Hansen Atlas Sheet 5 as Breidhovde. It was first visited by an ANARE party led by Peter W. Crohn in May 1956.

On its southern side is Cirque Fjord.

== See also ==
- Blackrock Head
- Tryne Point
