= Roar Tønseth =

Norwegian architect

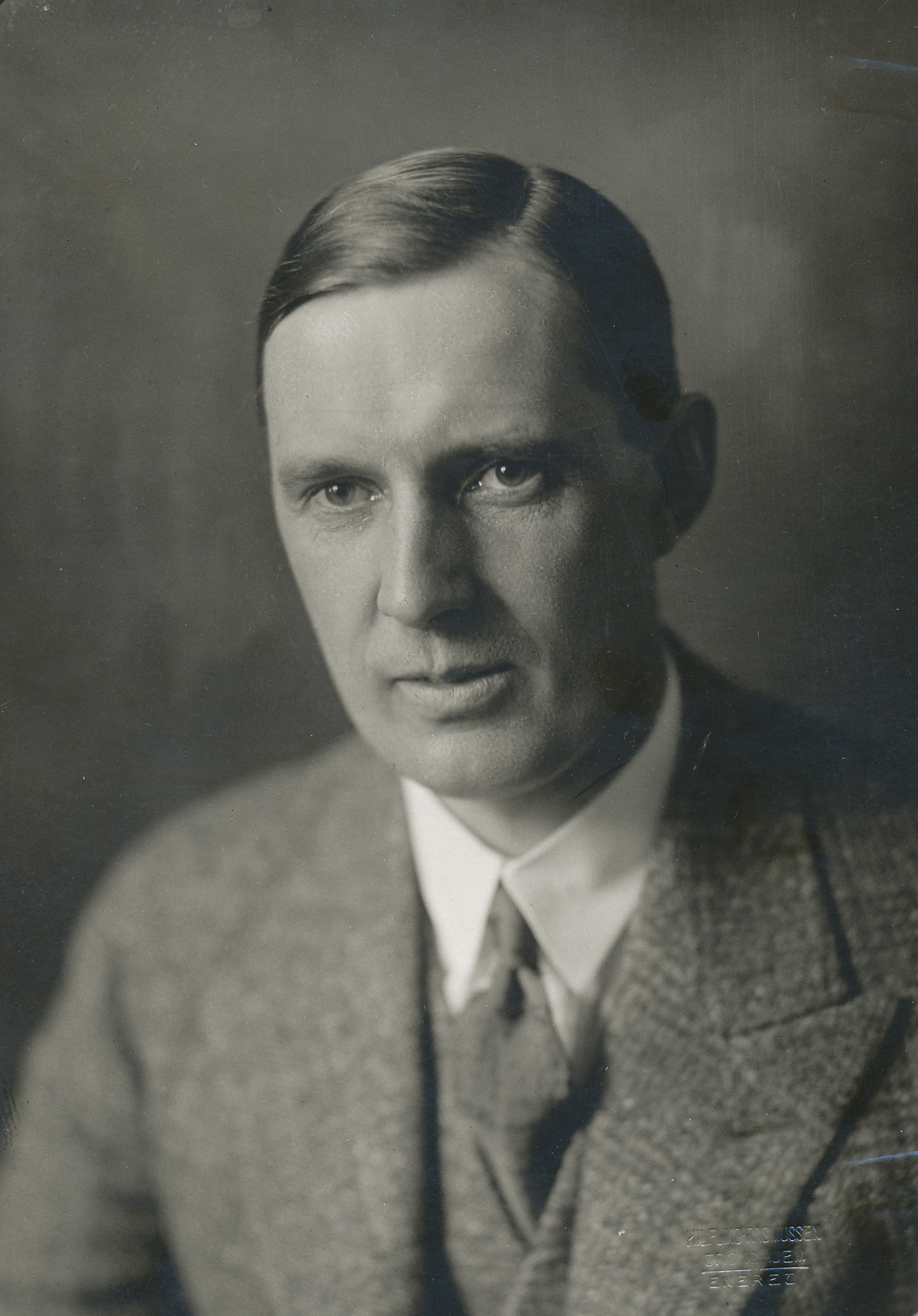
- Born: 24 October 1895; Trondheim, Norway
- Died: 25 May 1985 (aged 89); Trondheim, Norway
- Education: Norwegian Institute of Technology
- Occupation: Architect

Roar Tønseth (1895—1985) was a Norwegian architect. He had an unusually long career as an architect, stretching from before 1920 to the early 1980s.

Roar Tønseth was the son of Johannes Tønseth (1860–1896) and Henrikke Ryjord (1869–1940). His uncle was architect Nils Ryjord, who, in addition to his own architectural practice, played a key role in the restoration work at Nidaros Cathedral. Tønseth married Anna Bolette ('Annikken') Aschenberg in 1926.

After graduating with his examen artium, Roar Tønseth became a bricklayer apprentice to his uncle Nils Ryjord in 1913. The following year, he began studying architecture at the Norwegian University of Technology. He graduated as an architect in 1919. From 1919 to 1921, Tønseth was then employed as an assistant to Professor Olaf Nordhagen and architect Morten Anker Bachke. Starting in 1921, he worked for two years as an assistant to architect Claus Hjelte. In 1923, Tønseth started his own architectural practice in Trondheim. He designed many buildings and is notable for the number of church buildings and tourist cabins that he designed. Roar Tønseth won first prize in a number of architectural competitions during his career.

Roar Tønseth was arrested and imprisoned by the occupation authorities during World War II. He was arrested on 1 March 1943 at Vollan. On 5 July 1943 he was transferred to Falstad prison camp, and on 18 March 1944 he was transferred to Grini prison camp outside Oslo, where he was held captive until peace came in May 1945.

In 1937, Tønseth was elected to the board of Trondheim's Art Association, a position he continued in after World War II. From 1945 to 1947 he was the chairman of the association. From 1938 to 1950 he was also a member of the board of the Trondheim Museum of Art and Design.
