= Kvam =

Kvam may refer to:

== People ==
- Adolph Kvam (1917–2006), an American politician and businessman
- Isaac J. Kvam (1864–1917), an American Lutheran minister and elected official
- Kela Kvam (1931–2019), a Danish academic and writer
- Ragnar Kvam (1917–2006), a Norwegian journalist, novelist, translator and literary critic
- Ragnar Kvam Jr. (born 1942), a Norwegian journalist, globetrotter, biographer and non-fiction writer

== Places ==
=== Norway ===
- Kvam Municipality, a municipality in Vestland county
- Kvam Municipality (Nord-Trøndelag), a former municipality in the old Nord-Trøndelag county
- Kvam, Steinkjer, a village in Steinkjer Municipality in Trøndelag county
- Kvam, Innlandet, a village in Nord-Fron Municipality in Innlandet county
- Kvam Station, a railway station in Nord-Fron Municipality in Innlandet county
- Kvam Church, a church in Steinkjer Municipality in Trøndelag county
- Kvam Church (Nord-Fron), a church in Nord-Fron Municipality in Innlandet county

== See also ==
- KVAM (disambiguation), a list of radio stations with the call sign
