= Hans Gabriel Nissen Buck =

Norwegian physician and politician

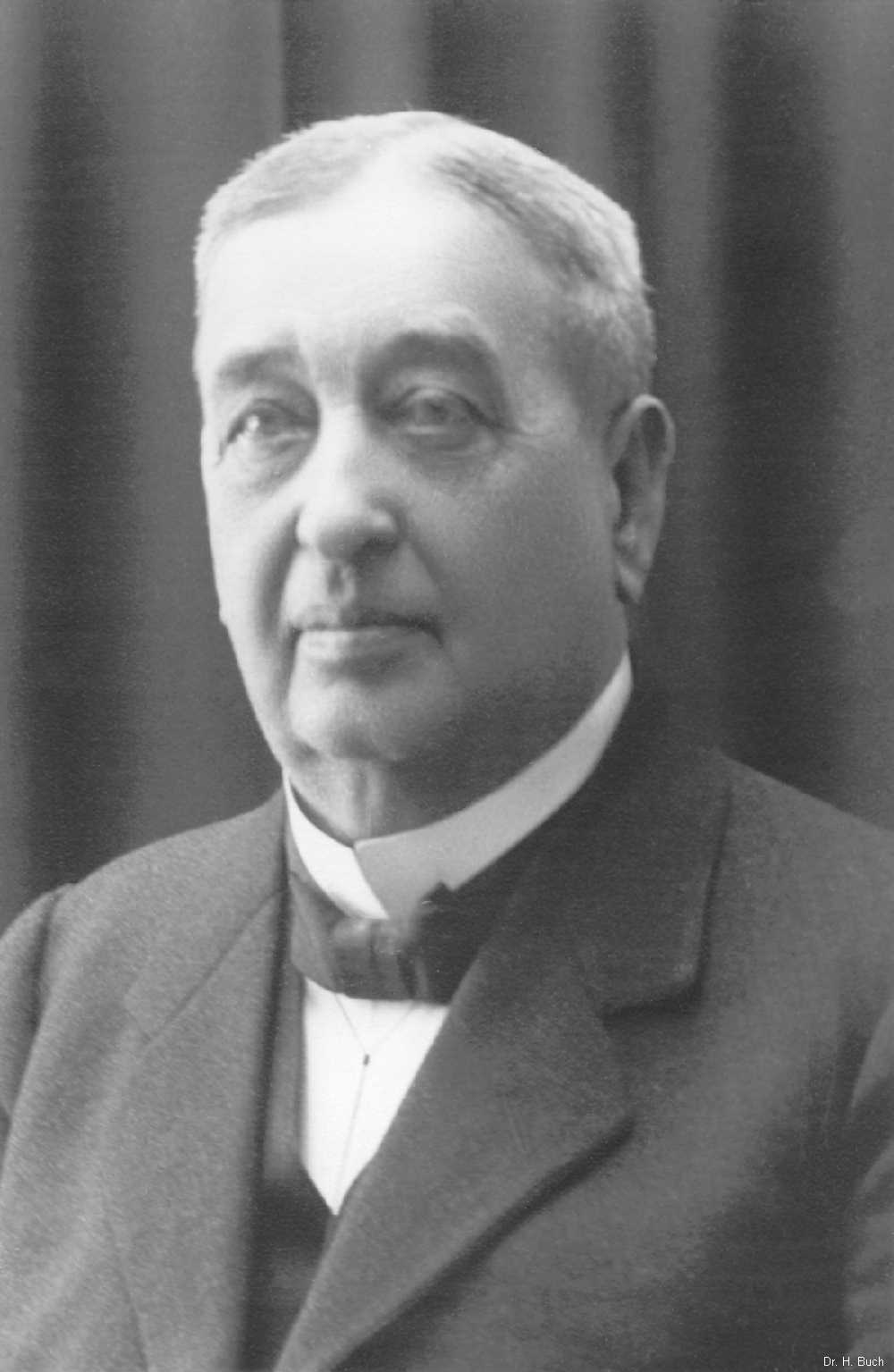
Hans Gabriel Nissen Buck

Hans Gabriel Nissen Buck (2 May 1848 – 21 May 1924) was a Norwegian physician and politician for the Conservative Party.

He was born in Inderøy in Nord-Trøndelag county, Norway as the son of captain Jørgen Mandix Buck (1814–1878) and his wife Fredrikke Gebhardine Nissen (1822–1902). He enrolled as a student in 1867 and graduated as cand.med. in 1874. He first opened his own physician's office in Fredrikstad, but then worked as municipal physician in Stor-Elvdal, then for the municipalities of Sparbu, Stod and Egge from 1878, then in Undal from 1885, then in Trondenes from 1895, and finally in Levanger from 1906. In 1912 he was appointed county physician of Nordre Trondhjems amt.

Where he lived, he became involved in politics. He became mayor of Harstad Municipality in 1904. He was deputy mayor of Levanger Municipality in 1910, 1911 and 1915, and mayor in 1912, 1913 and 1914. He served as a deputy representative to the Parliament of Norway during the term 1916–1918. From 1922 to 1924 he was burgomaster of Levanger.
