= Kvam Municipality (Nord-Trøndelag) =

Former municipality in Trøndelag, Norway

Kvam Municipality Kvam herred
- Former municipality
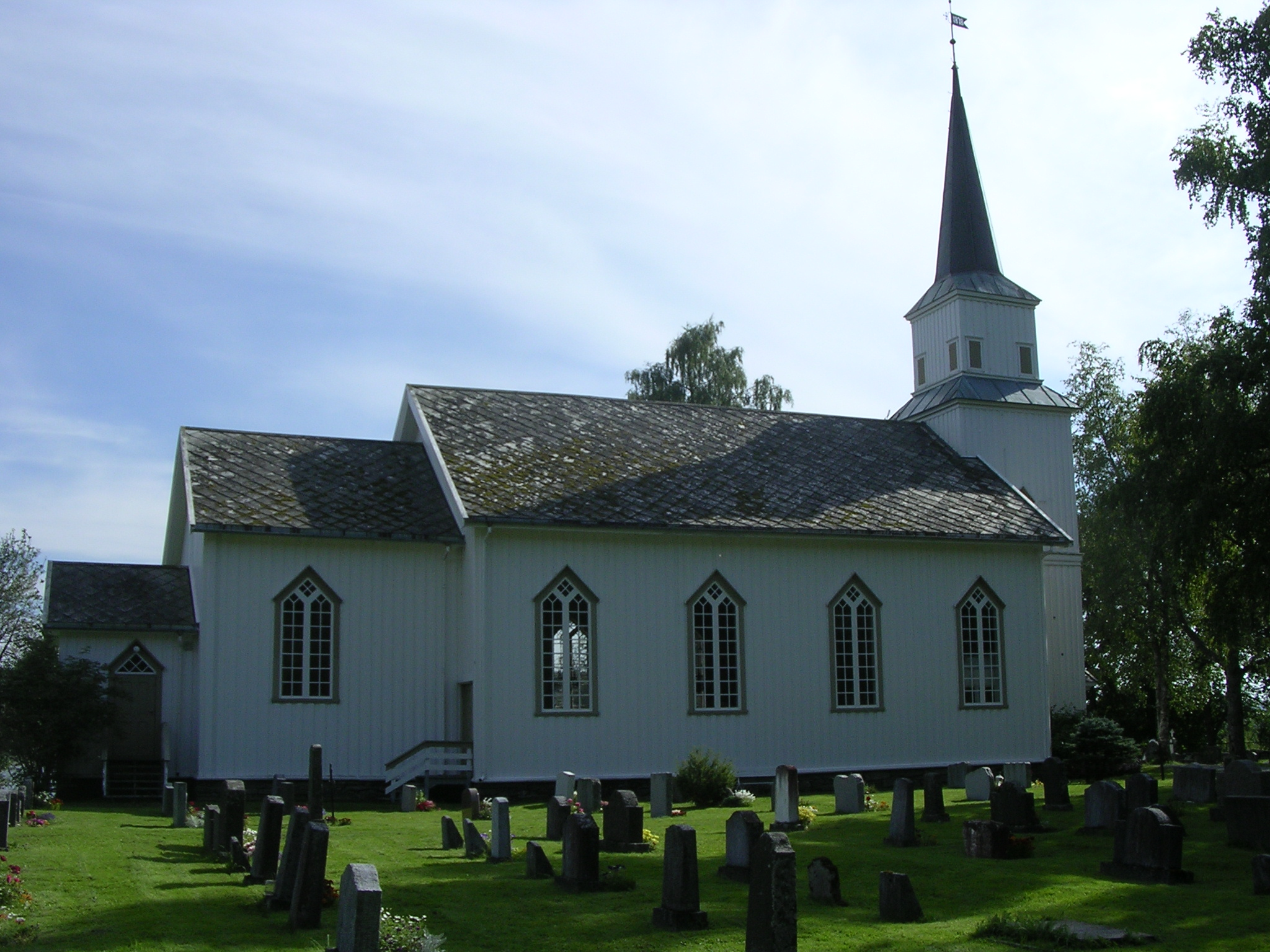
- View of the municipal church

- Nord-Trøndelag within Norway

- Kvam within Nord-Trøndelag
- Coordinates: 64.1401°N 11.7394°E
- Country: Norway
- County: Nord-Trøndelag
- District: Innherred
- Established: 1 Jan 1909
  - Preceded by: Stod Municipality
- Disestablished: 1 Jan 1964
  - Succeeded by: Steinkjer Municipality
- Administrative centre: Kvam

Government
  - Mayor (1960–1963): Olav Hus (Sp)

Area (upon dissolution)
  - Total: 376.8 km^{2} (145.5 sq mi)
  - Rank: #239 in Norway
- Highest elevation: 555 m (1,821 ft)

Population (1963)
  - Total: 1,258
  - Rank: #573 in Norway
  - Density: 3.3/km^{2} (8.5/sq mi)
  - Change (10 years): ▼ −3.9%
- Demonym: Kvamssokning

Official language
  - Norwegian form: Neutral
- Time zone: UTC+01:00 (CET)
  - Summer (DST): UTC+02:00 (CEST)
- ISO 3166 code: NO-1735

Kvam is a former municipality in what was Nord-Trøndelag county in Norway. The 377-square-kilometre (146 sq mi) municipality existed from 1909 until its dissolution in 1964. The municipality encompassed the areas north and west of the lake Snåsavatnet in what is now Steinkjer Municipality in Trøndelag county. The administrative centre was the village of Kvam on the shore of the lake. Most of the population of Kvam Municipality lived along the lake shore. Farther north from the lake includes a wilderness area including the large lakes Gilten and Bangsjøene. The main church for the municipality was Kvam Church, located in the village of Kvam.

Prior to its dissolution in 1963, the 377-square-kilometre (146 sq mi) municipality was the 239th largest by area out of the 689 municipalities in Norway. Kvam Municipality was the 573rd most populous municipality in Norway with a population of about 1,258. The municipality's population density was 3.3 inhabitants per square kilometre (8.5/sq mi) and its population had decreased by 3.9% over the previous 10-year period.

== General information ==
The municipality of Kvam was established on 1 January 1909 when the large Stod Municipality was split into two: Kvam Municipality (population: 934) in the north and Stod Municipality (population: 1,169) in the south. During the 1960s, there were many municipal mergers across Norway due to the work of the Schei Committee.

On 1 January 1964, a large municipal merger took place involving six rural municipalities and the town of Steinkjer. The following places were merged to form a new, larger Steinkjer Municipality:

- the town of Steinkjer (population: 4,325)
- Sparbu Municipality (population: 4,027)
- Egge Municipality (population: 3,476)
- Ogndal Municipality (population: 2,678)
- Beitstad Municipality (population: 2,563)
- Stod Municipality (population: 1,268)
- Kvam Municipality (population: 1,245)

=== Name ===
The municipality (originally the parish) is named after the old Kvam farm (Old Norse: Hvammr) since the first Kvam Church was built there. The name comes from the word hvammr which means "grassy hollow" or "little vale".

=== Churches ===
The Church of Norway had one parish (sokn) within Kvam Municipality. At the time of the municipal dissolution, it was part of the Stod prestegjeld and the Nord-Innherad prosti (deanery) in the Diocese of Nidaros.

Churches in Kvam Municipality
| Parish (sokn) | Church name | Location of the church | Year built |
|---|---|---|---|
| Kvam | Kvam Church | Kvam | 1878 |
| Følling | Følling Church | Følling | 1726 |

== Geography ==
Kvam Municipality was located north of the town of Steinkjer. It was surrounded by Klinga Municipality and Overhalla Municipality to the north, Snåsa Municipality to the east, Stod Municipality and Egge Municipality to the south, and Beitstad Municipality to the west. The highest point in the municipality was the 555-metre (1,821 ft) tall mountain Saursheia, near the border with Snåsa Municipality.

== Government ==
While it existed, Kvam Municipality was responsible for primary education (through 10th grade), outpatient health services, senior citizen services, welfare and other social services, zoning, economic development, and municipal roads and utilities. The municipality was governed by a municipal council of directly elected representatives. The mayor was indirectly elected by a vote of the municipal council. The municipality was under the jurisdiction of the Frostating Court of Appeal.

=== Municipal council ===
The municipal council (Herredsstyre) of Kvam Municipality was made up of 13 representatives that were elected to four year terms. The tables below show the historical composition of the council by political party.

Kvam herredsstyre 1959–1963
| Party name (in Norwegian) | Number of representatives |
|---|---|
| Labour Party (Arbeiderpartiet) | 3 |
| Centre Party (Senterpartiet) | 9 |
| Liberal Party (Venstre) | 1 |
| Total number of members: | 13 |

Kvam herredsstyre 1955–1959
| Party name (in Norwegian) | Number of representatives |
|---|---|
| Labour Party (Arbeiderpartiet) | 3 |
| Farmers' Party (Bondepartiet) | 8 |
| Liberal Party (Venstre) | 2 |
| Total number of members: | 13 |

Kvam herredsstyre 1951–1955
| Party name (in Norwegian) | Number of representatives |
|---|---|
| Labour Party (Arbeiderpartiet) | 3 |
| Farmers' Party (Bondepartiet) | 7 |
| Liberal Party (Venstre) | 2 |
| Total number of members: | 12 |

Kvam herredsstyre 1947–1951
| Party name (in Norwegian) | Number of representatives |
|---|---|
| Labour Party (Arbeiderpartiet) | 3 |
| Farmers' Party (Bondepartiet) | 5 |
| Liberal Party (Venstre) | 1 |
| Joint List(s) of Non-Socialist Parties (Borgerlige Felleslister) | 3 |
| Total number of members: | 12 |

Kvam herredsstyre 1945–1947
| Party name (in Norwegian) | Number of representatives |
|---|---|
| Labour Party (Arbeiderpartiet) | 4 |
| Farmers' Party (Bondepartiet) | 4 |
| Liberal Party (Venstre) | 1 |
| Joint List(s) of Non-Socialist Parties (Borgerlige Felleslister) | 3 |
| Total number of members: | 12 |

Kvam herredsstyre 1937–1941*
| Party name (in Norwegian) | Number of representatives |
|---|---|
| Labour Party (Arbeiderpartiet) | 2 |
| Joint List(s) of Non-Socialist Parties (Borgerlige Felleslister) | 6 |
| Local List(s) (Lokale lister) | 4 |
| Total number of members: | 12 |
Note: Due to the German occupation of Norway during World War II, no elections were held for new municipal councils until after the war ended in 1945.

=== Mayors ===
The mayor (Norwegian: ordfører) of Kvam Municipality was the political leader of the municipality and the chairperson of the municipal council. Here is a list of people who held this position:

- 1909–1910: Ole H. Langhammer (V)
- 1911–1913: Nils Flekstad
- 1914–1925: Ole H. Langhammer (V/Bp)
- 1925–1941: Peter H. Wanderaas (Bp)
- 1942–1943: Birger Øksnes
- 1944–1945: Aksel Aassve
- 1945–1945: Sverre M. Sem (Bp)
- 1946–1947: Arne Grøtan (Bp)
- 1948–1959: Sverre M. Sem (Bp)
- 1959–1959: Oleiv Flekstad (Sp)
- 1960–1963: Olav Hus (Sp)

== See also ==
- List of former municipalities of Norway
