= KVAM =

KVAM may refer to:

- KVAM (FM), a radio station (88.1 FM) licensed to serve Cheyenne, Wyoming, United States
- KFBU, a radio station (1630 AM) licensed to serve Fox Farm, Wyoming, which held the call sign KVAM from 2021 to 2022
- KXJJ, a radio station (1570 AM) licensed to serve Loveland, Colorado, United States, which held the call sign KVAM from 2016 to 2021
- KBUD (FM), a radio station (93.7 FM) licensed to serve Deer Trail, Colorado, which held the call sign KVAM from 2015 to 2016
- KBHM, a radio station (88.3 FM) licensed to serve Kimball, Nebraska, United States, which held the call sign KVAM from 2010 to 2015

== See also ==
- Kvam (disambiguation)
