= Kvam, Steinkjer =

Village in Steinkjer Municipality, Norway

Kvam
- Village
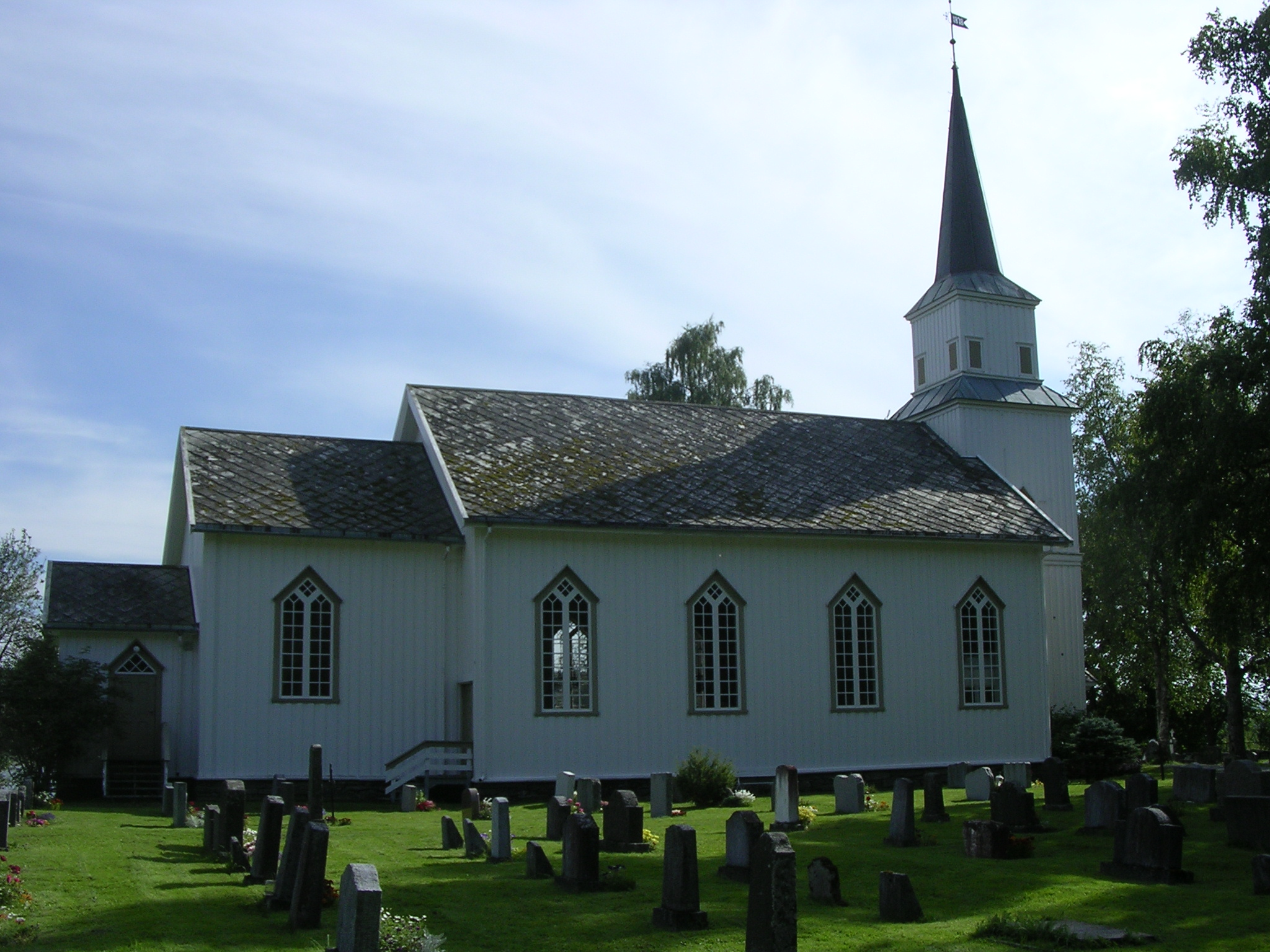
- View of the village church
- Interactive map of Kvam
- Location within Trøndelag Location within Norway
- Coordinates: 64.1401°N 11.7394°E
- Country: Norway
- Region: Central Norway
- County: Trøndelag
- District: Innherred
- Municipality: Steinkjer Municipality
- Elevation: 35 m (115 ft)
- Time zone: UTC+01:00 (CET)
  - Summer (DST): UTC+02:00 (CEST)
- Post Code: 7732 Steinkjer

Kvam is a village in Steinkjer Municipality in Trøndelag county, Norway. The village is located along the northern shore of the lake Snåsavatnet along the European route E6 highway, about 11 kilometres (6.8 mi) northeast of the village of Følling and about 20 kilometres (12 mi) northeast of the town of Steinkjer.

The small village of Kvam lies directly on the lake shore and it has a school, store, senior living center, and Kvam Church. Farther north from the lake includes a wilderness area including the large lakes Gilten and Bangsjøan. The village was the administrative centre of the old Kvam Municipality which existed from 1909 until its dissolution in 1964.
