= Rasmus Overrein =

Norwegian builder and architect

Rasmus Mentsen Overrein
- Born: 5 March 1815; Stod, Norway
- Died: 26 May 1895 (aged 80); Egge, Norway
- Occupation: Architect
- Parent(s): Mens Pedersen Marken; Karen Olsdatter

Rasmus Overrein (1815–1895) was a Norwegian builder and architect who built a number of churches in the Nord-Trøndelag area in Norway.

Overrein was largely a self-taught builder. Starting around 1840, he began constructing buildings in the area of what is now Steinkjer Municipality in Trøndelag county. In 1856, he used the designs of Christian Heinrich Grosch to build the Namdalseid Church. That church served as a model of many other churches that Overrein would go on the build in the future. Most of his other churches were a simplified design version of the Namdalseid Church: and simple long church with some sparse Neo-Gothic details.

== Works ==
He built or renovated the following churches:

- Egge Church
- Henning Church
- Kolvereid Church
- Følling Church
- Malm Church
- Salberg Church
- Kvam Church
- For Church (tower)
- Gimsøy Church
