= Ogndal Municipality =

Former municipality in Trøndelag, Norway

Ogndal Municipality Ogndal herad
- Former municipality
- Ogndalen herred (historic name); Skei herred (historic name)
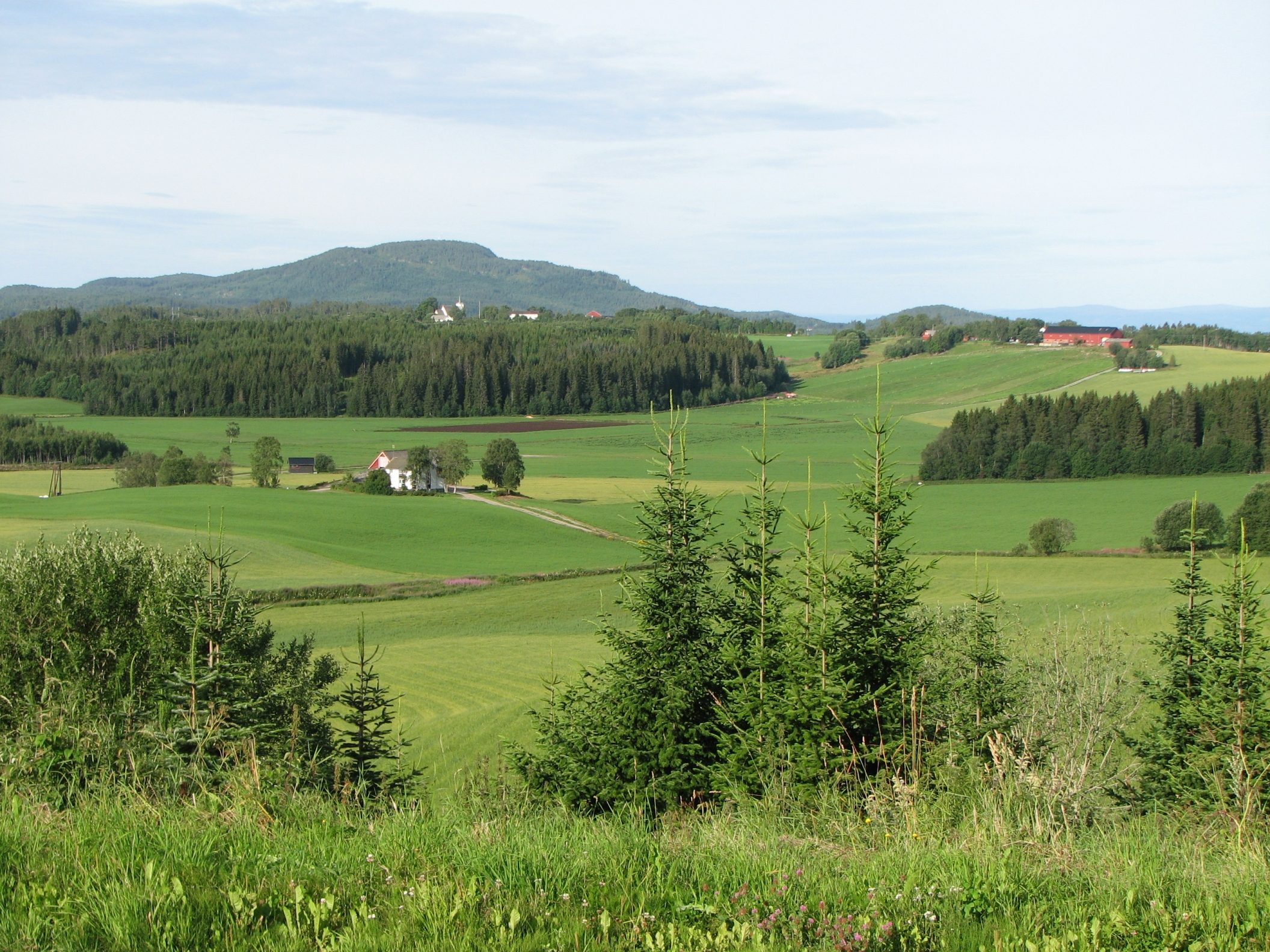
- View of the Skei area in Ogndal

- Trøndelag within Norway

- Ogndal within Trøndelag
- Coordinates: 64°01′11″N 11°37′52″E
- Country: Norway
- County: Trøndelag
- District: Innherred
- Established: 1 Jan 1885
  - Preceded by: Sparbu Municipality
- Disestablished: 1 Jan 1964
  - Succeeded by: Steinkjer Municipality
- Administrative centre: Steinkjer

Government
  - Mayor (1963-1963): Reidar Johansen (Ap)

Area (upon dissolution)
  - Total: 418 km^{2} (161 sq mi)
  - Rank: #227 in Norway
- Highest elevation: 768.4 m (2,521 ft)

Population (1963)
  - Total: 2,625
  - Rank: #351 in Norway
  - Density: 6.3/km^{2} (16/sq mi)
  - Change (10 years): ▲ +22.3%
- Demonym: Ogndaling

Official language
  - Norwegian form: Nynorsk
- Time zone: UTC+01:00 (CET)
  - Summer (DST): UTC+02:00 (CEST)
- ISO 3166 code: NO-1732

Ogndal (historically: Skei) is a former municipality in what was the old Nord-Trøndelag county, Norway. The 418-square-kilometre (161 sq mi) municipality existed from 1885 until its dissolution in 1964. The municipality included the whole Ogndalen valley and areas to the west, up to, but not including the town of Steinkjer in what is now the central and western part of Steinkjer Municipality in Trøndelag county. Initially, the administrative centre of the municipality was the small village of Skei where the Skei Church was located. In 1917, the administrative center of Ogndal was moved to the nearby town of Steinkjer (even though that was not a part of Ogndal Municipality).

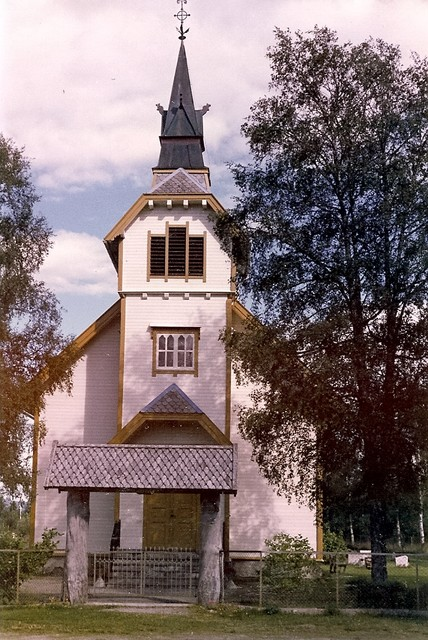
Skei Church

Prior to its dissolution in 1963, the 418-square-kilometre (161 sq mi) municipality was the 227th largest by area out of the 689 municipalities in Norway. Ogndal Municipality was the 351st most populous municipality in Norway with a population of about 2,625. The municipality's population density was 6.3 inhabitants per square kilometre (16/sq mi) and its population had increased by 22.3% over the previous 10-year period.

The main church for Ogndal, Skei Church, is located in the village of Skei in western Ogndal. Another church, Bodom Chapel, is located in the eastern part of the municipality.

== General information ==
The municipality of Skei was established on 1 January 1885 when it was separated from the larger Sparbu Municipality. The initial population of Skei Municipality was 1,441. On 13 December 1900, the name was changed from Skei Municipality to Ogndal Municipality, since the municipality encompasses the Ogndalen valley, through which the river Ogna flows.

The municipality of Ogndal bordered the growing town of Steinkjer and as Steinkjer grew, it annexed parts of Ogndal Municipality. On 1 January 1902, an unpopulated area in western Ogndal Municipality was transferred to the town of Steinkjer. In 1941, another small area of Ogndal Municipality (population: 57) was transferred to the town of Steinkjer. Again, in 1948, another small area of Ogndal Municipality (population: 78) was transferred to Steinkjer.

On 1 January 1964, a large municipal merger took place involving six rural municipalities and the town of Steinkjer. The following places were merged to form a new, larger Steinkjer Municipality:

- the town of Steinkjer (population: 4,325)
- Sparbu Municipality (population: 4,027)
- Egge Municipality (population: 3,476)
- Ogndal Municipality (population: 2,678)
- Beitstad Municipality (population: 2,563)
- Stod Municipality (population: 1,268)
- Kvam Municipality (population: 1,245)

=== Name ===
The municipality was originally (from 1885 until 1900) named after the old Skei farm (Old Norse: Skeiði) since the first Skei Church was built there. The name is the dative case of skeið which means "a place for racing or riding". On 13 December 1900, a royal resolution changed the spelling of the name of the municipality from Skei to Ogndalen. The new name came from the local Ogndalen valley (Old Norse: Ógnardalr) in which the municipality is located. The first element comes from the name of the local river Ogna. It is the genitive case of the word ógn which means "fear" or "the terrifying". The last element is dalr which means "valley" or "dale". On 3 November 1917, a royal resolution changed the spelling of the name of the municipality to Ogndal, removing the definite form ending -en.

=== Churches ===
The Church of Norway had one parish (sokn) within Ogndal Municipality. At the time of the municipal dissolution, it was part of the Sparbu prestegjeld and the Nord-Innherad prosti (deanery) in the Diocese of Nidaros.

Churches in Ogndal Municipality
Parish (sokn)	Church name	Location of the church	Year built
Ogndal	Skei Church	Skei	1664
Bodom Chapel	Bodom	1905	

== Geography ==
Ogndal Municipality was located east of the town of Steinkjer and Egge Municipality. It was also bordered by Stod Municipality to the north, Snåsa Municipality to the northeast, Verdal Municipality to the southeast, and Sparbu Municipality to the southwest. The highest point in the municipality was the 768.4-metre (2,521 ft) tall mountain Semsklumpen, on the border with Verdal Municipality.

== Government ==
While it existed, Ogndal Municipality was responsible for primary education (through 10th grade), outpatient health services, senior citizen services, welfare and other social services, zoning, economic development, and municipal roads and utilities. The municipality was governed by a municipal council of directly elected representatives. The mayor was indirectly elected by a vote of the municipal council. The municipality was under the jurisdiction of the Frostating Court of Appeal.

=== Municipal council ===
The municipal council (Herredsstyre) of Ogndal Municipality was made up of representatives that were elected to four year terms. The tables below show the historical composition of the council by political party.

Ogndal heradsstyre 1959–1963
Party name (in Nynorsk)	Number of representatives
Labour Party (Arbeidarpartiet)	10
Centre Party (Senterpartiet)	5
Liberal Party (Venstre)	2
Total number of members:	17

Ogndal heradsstyre 1955–1959
Party name (in Nynorsk)	Number of representatives
Labour Party (Arbeidarpartiet)	10
Conservative Party (Høgre)	1
Farmers' Party (Bondepartiet)	4
Liberal Party (Venstre)	2
Total number of members:	17

Ogndal heradsstyre 1951–1955
Party name (in Nynorsk)	Number of representatives
Labour Party (Arbeidarpartiet)	7
Farmers' Party (Bondepartiet)	3
Liberal Party (Venstre)	2
Total number of members:	12

Ogndal heradsstyre 1947–1951
Party name (in Nynorsk)	Number of representatives
Labour Party (Arbeidarpartiet)	5
Farmers' Party (Bondepartiet)	5
Liberal Party (Venstre)	2
Total number of members:	12

Ogndal heradsstyre 1945–1947
Party name (in Nynorsk)	Number of representatives
Labour Party (Arbeidarpartiet)	5
Farmers' Party (Bondepartiet)	5
Liberal Party (Venstre)	2
Total number of members:	12

Ogndal heradsstyre 1937–1941*
Party name (in Nynorsk)	Number of representatives
Labour Party (Arbeidarpartiet)	6
Farmers' Party (Bondepartiet)	4
Liberal Party (Venstre)	2
Total number of members:	12
Note: Due to the German occupation of Norway during World War II, no elections were held for new municipal councils until after the war ended in 1945.

=== Mayors ===
The mayor (Nynorsk: ordførar) of Ogndal Municipality was the political leader of the municipality and the chairperson of the municipal council. Here is a list of people who held this position:

- 1885–1891: Benjamin Ryan
- 1892–1893: Sakarias Støen
- 1894–1897: Johan Kristian Schiefloe
- 1898–1898: Oluf Anton Schult
- 1899–1910: Christian Overrein
- 1911–1913: Rafael Bolaas (LL)
- 1914–1916: Edvard Røysing (LL)
- 1917–1919: Bertin Kjesbu (LL)
- 1920–1922: Nikolay Norstrøm (LL)
- 1923–1925: Bertin Kjesbu (Bp)
- 1926–1927: Nikolay Norstrøm (Bp)
- 1927–1928: Arne Kjesbu (Bp)
- 1929–1931: Bertin Kjesbu (Bp)
- 1932–1937: Arne Kjesbu (Bp)
- 1938–1941: Axel Stigum (Ap)
- 1942–1945: Arnfinn Benum (NS)
- 1945–1945: Axel Stigum (Ap)
- 1946–1947: Andreas Bruem (Bp)
- 1948–1951: Alf Øye (Bp)
- 1952–1955: Axel Stigum (Ap)
- 1956–1963: Johan Mathisen (Ap)
- 1963–1963: Reidar Johansen (Ap)

== See also ==
- List of former municipalities of Norway
