= Bodom Chapel =

Church in Trøndelag, Norway

- Bodom kapell
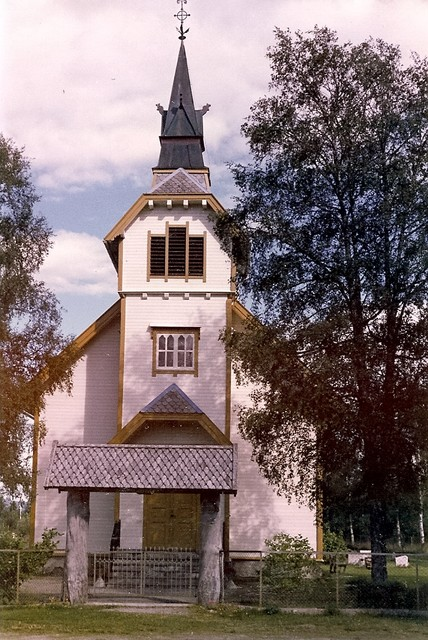
- View of the chapel
- Bodom Chapel
- 63.9720130°N 11.91873371°E
- Location: Steinkjer Municipality, Trøndelag
- Country: Norway
- Denomination: Church of Norway
- Churchmanship: Evangelical Lutheran

History
- Status: Parish church
- Founded: 1905
- Consecrated: 1 Aug 1905

Architecture
- Functional status: Active
- Architect: Søren Wiese Opsahl
- Architectural type: Long church
- Completed: 1905 (121 years ago)

Specifications
- Capacity: 150
- Materials: Wood

Administration
- Diocese: Nidaros bispedømme
- Deanery: Stiklestad prosti
- Parish: Ogndal
- Norwegian Cultural Heritage Site
- Type: Church
- Status: Listed
- ID: 83918

Bodom Chapel (Norwegian: Bodom kapell) is a parish church of the Church of Norway in Steinkjer Municipality in Trøndelag county, Norway. It is located in the upper Ogndalen valley, about 26 kilometres (16 mi) east of the town of Steinkjer. It is one of the churches for the Ogndal parish, part of the Stiklestad prosti (deanery) in the Diocese of Nidaros. The white, wooden chapel was built in a long church style in 1905 using plans drawn up by the architect Søren Wiese Opsahl. The chapel seats about 120 people.

== History ==
The chapel was initially built to serve the upper Ogndalen valley. David Kristian Bodom left money to the parish after his death to help fund the chapel's construction. The new chapel was consecrated on 1 August 1905 by Bishop Vilhelm Andreas Wexelsen. Later, the chapel was upgraded to be a full parish church. The building was extensively renovated in 1970.

== See also ==
- List of churches in Nidaros
