= Skei, Trøndelag =

Village in Steinkjer Municipality, Norway

Skei Ogndal
- Village
- Interactive map of Skei
- Location within Trøndelag Location within Norway
- Coordinates: 64.02059°N 11.63173°E
- Country: Norway
- Region: Central Norway
- County: Trøndelag
- District: Innherred
- Municipality: Steinkjer Municipality
- Elevation: 111 m (364 ft)
- Time zone: UTC+01:00 (CET)
  - Summer (DST): UTC+02:00 (CEST)
- Post Code: 7718 Steinkjer

Skei (also known as Ogndal) is a village in Steinkjer Municipality in Trøndelag county, Norway. The village is located in the Ogndalen valley, about 7 kilometres (4.3 mi) east of the town of Steinkjer. The rural village is the site of the Skei Church. The village was part of Ogndal Municipality until 1964 when it became part of Steinkjer Municipality.
