= Egge Church =

Church in Trøndelag, Norway

- Egge kirke
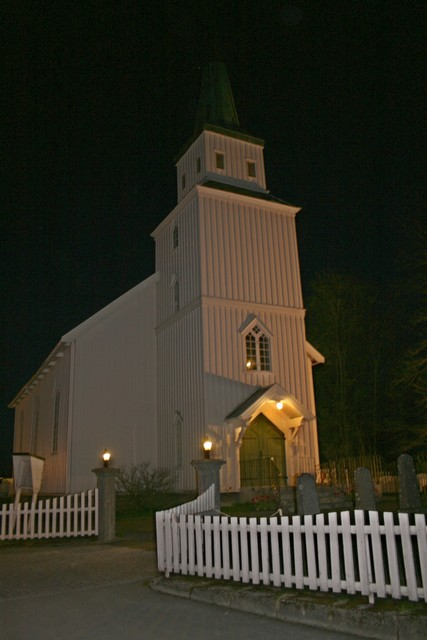
- View of the church
- Egge Church
- 64.02330757°N 11.47462695°E
- Location: Steinkjer Municipality, Trøndelag
- Country: Norway
- Denomination: Church of Norway
- Churchmanship: Evangelical Lutheran

History
- Status: Parish church
- Founded: 14th century
- Consecrated: 1870

Architecture
- Functional status: Active
- Architect: Rasmus M. Overrein
- Architectural type: Long church
- Style: Empire style
- Completed: 1870 (156 years ago)

Specifications
- Capacity: 330
- Length: 15.5 metres (51 ft)
- Width: 11.3 metres (37 ft)
- Materials: Wood

Administration
- Diocese: Nidaros bispedømme
- Deanery: Stiklestad prosti
- Parish: Egge
- Norwegian Cultural Heritage Site
- Type: Church
- Status: Automatically protected
- ID: 84055

Egge Church (Norwegian: Egge kirke) is a parish church of the Church of Norway in Steinkjer Municipality in Trøndelag county, Norway. It is located on the northern edge of the town of Steinkjer (in the area that used to be Egge Municipality before 1964). It is the church for the Egge parish which is part of the Stiklestad prosti (deanery) in the Diocese of Nidaros. The white, wooden church was built in a long church design in the empire style in 1870 using plans drawn up by the architect Rasmus Mentsen Overrein. The church seats about 330 people.

== History ==
The earliest existing historical records of the church date back to the year 1490, but the church was not new that year. The first church was a stave church that was likely built in the 14th century. The old church stood for several centuries. Records from 1588 indicate that there were 29 farmers that belonged to the church. In 1661, supports were added to the church to keep it standing as it was in very poor condition.

In 1676, the church was heavily renovated and mostly rebuilt. The old nave was rebuilt as the choir of the new church and the old choir was repurposed as a confessional room. A brand new nave was built on the east side of the old building. The new nave was a cruciform design. The new building was consecrated in 1676 by the Bishop Erik Eriksen Pontoppidan d.e. This church existed for 90 years until it was struck by lightning and burned down on 11 August 1765.

Soon after the fire, planning for a new church began. A new long church was built on the same site during the late 1760s. It contained the altar table that is still in use in the present church. In 1870, the church was either torn down and replaced or it was heavily renovated and rebuilt as a larger building. Either way, the sources agree that Rasmus Overrein led the work. The church is 15.5 by 11.3 metres (51 ft × 37 ft) and has a steeple that reaches about 30 metres (98 ft) into the air. In 1932, a major restoration was carried out with rebuilding inside according to plans by John Egil Tverdahl.

== Media gallery ==
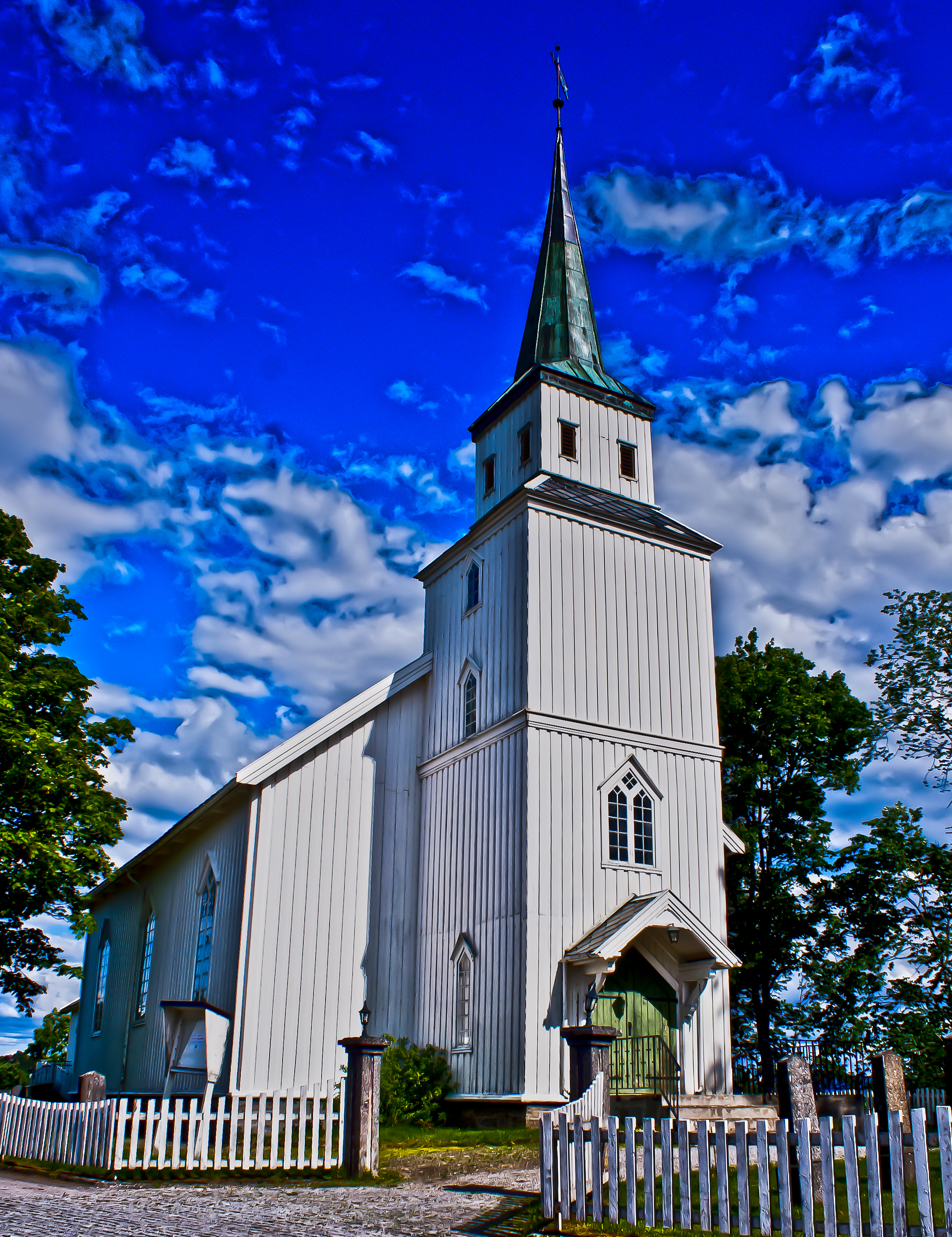
View from 2011

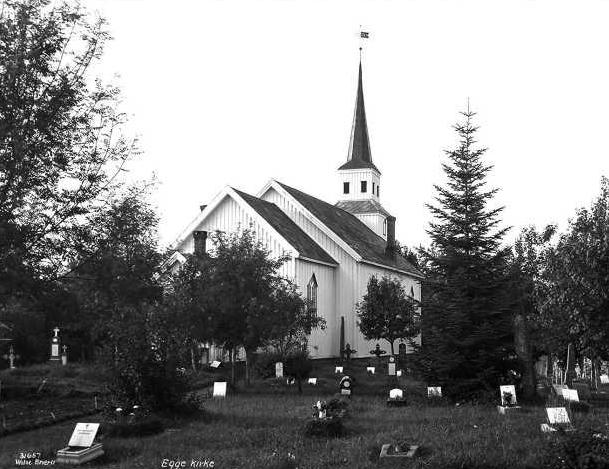
View from 1927

== See also ==
- List of churches in Nidaros
