= Gilten (lake) =

Lake in Trøndelag, Norway

- Interactive map of the lake
- Location: Steinkjer Municipality and Namsos Municipality, Trøndelag
- Coordinates: 64.2033°N 11.5291°E
- Basin countries: Norway
- Max. length: 6.5 kilometres (4.0 mi)
- Max. width: 1.5 kilometres (0.93 mi)
- Surface area: 31.62 km^{2} (12.21 sq mi)
- Shore length^{1}: 6.46 kilometres (4.01 mi)
- Surface elevation: 202 metres (663 ft)
- References: NVE
- ^{1} Shore length is not a well-defined measure.

Gilten is a lake in Trøndelag county, Norway. The lake lies mostly in Steinkjer Municipality, and a small part crossing into neighboring Namsos Municipality. The 31.62-square-kilometre (12.21 sq mi) lake lies in the northern part of Steinkjer Municipality, about 8 kilometres (5.0 mi) northeast of the village of Kvam, about 1.5 kilometres (0.93 mi) north of the village of Følling (and the European route E6 highway), and about 14 kilometres (8.7 mi) east of the village of Namdalseid. The lake is only accessible by road in Namsos Municipality, even though most of the 31.62-square-kilometre (12.21 sq mi) lake lies in Steinkjer Municipality. The lake Bangsjøan lies to the northeast and the lake Snåsavatnet lies to the south.

== See also ==
- List of lakes in Norway
