= Beitstad Municipality =

Former municipality in Trøndelag, Norway

Beitstad Municipality Beitstad kommune
- Former municipality
- Beitstaden herred (historic name); Bedstaden herred (historic name)
- Nord-Trøndelag within Norway

- Beitstad within Nord-Trøndelag
- Coordinates: 64°05′07″N 11°21′41″E
- Country: Norway
- County: Nord-Trøndelag
- District: Innherred
- Established: 1 Jan 1838
  - Created as: Formannskapsdistrikt
- Disestablished: 1 Jan 1964
  - Succeeded by: Steinkjer Municipality
- Administrative centre: Beitstad

Government
  - Mayor (1959–1963): Knut Aas (Sp)

Area (upon dissolution)
  - Total: 200.5 km^{2} (77.4 sq mi)
  - Rank: #370 in Norway
- Highest elevation: 530 m (1,740 ft)

Population (1963)
  - Total: 2,601
  - Rank: #353 in Norway
  - Density: 13/km^{2} (34/sq mi)
  - Change (10 years): ▼ −1.7%
- Demonym: Beitstøing

Official language
  - Norwegian form: Nynorsk
- Time zone: UTC+01:00 (CET)
  - Summer (DST): UTC+02:00 (CEST)
- ISO 3166 code: NO-1727

Beitstad (Urban East Norwegian: [ˈbæ̂ɪtstɑ]) is a former municipality in what was Nord-Trøndelag county, Norway. The 201-square-kilometre (78 sq mi) municipality existed from 1838 until its dissolution in 1964. The area is now part of Steinkjer Municipality in Trøndelag county. Beitstad was originally quite large, but by 1964, it included the areas east of the Beitstadsundet and Hjellbotn bay and north of the inner-most parts of the Trondheimsfjorden. The administrative centre was the village of Beitstad where Beitstad Church is located.

Prior to its dissolution in 1963, the 201-square-kilometre (78 sq mi) municipality was the 370th largest by area out of the 689 municipalities in Norway. Beitstad Municipality was the 353rd most populous municipality in Norway with a population of about 2,601. The municipality's population density was 13 inhabitants per square kilometre (34/sq mi) and its population had decreased by 1.7% over the previous 10-year period.

== General information ==
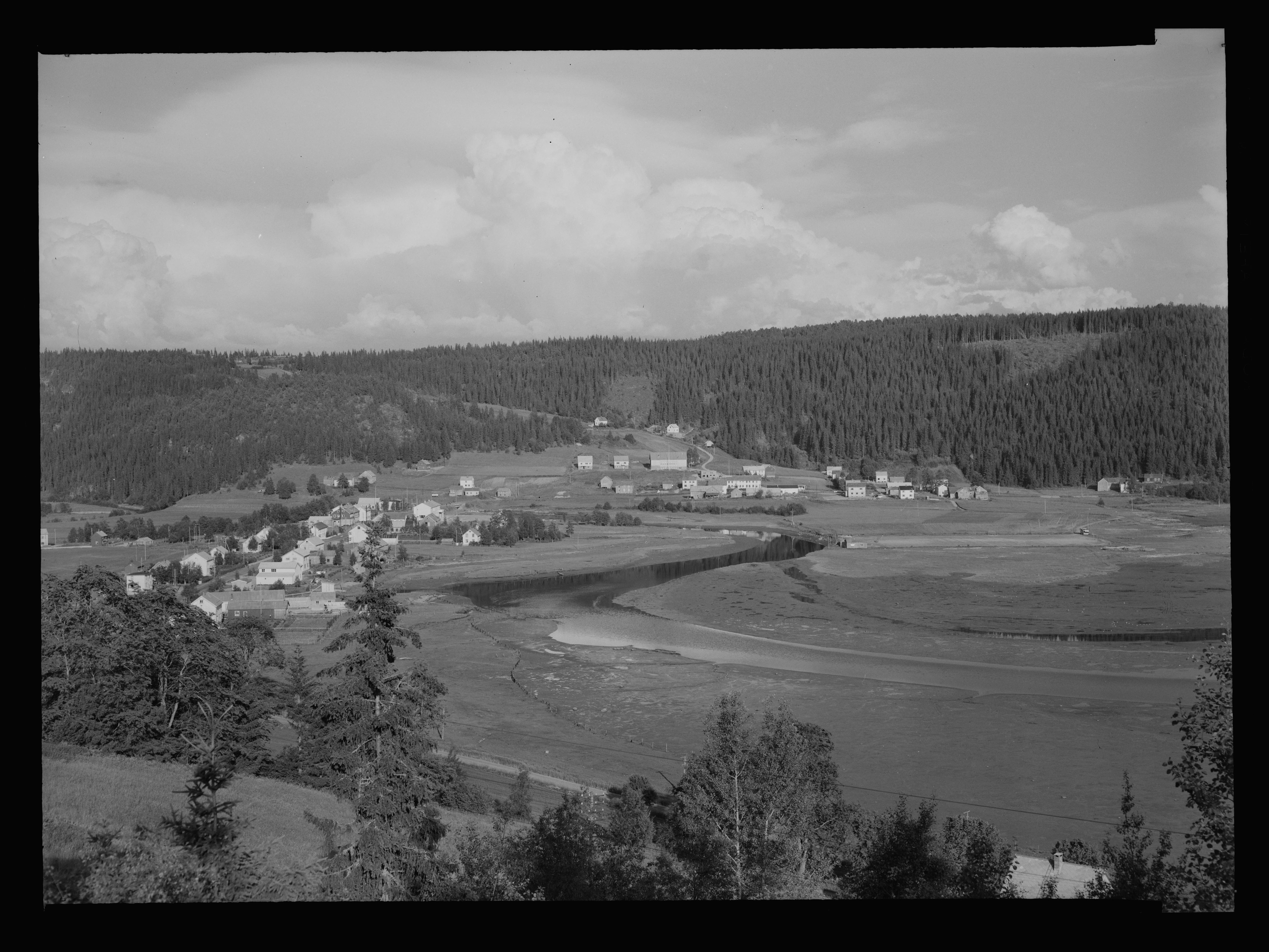
View of Beitstad (c. 1955)

The parish of Bedstaden was established as a municipality on 1 January 1838 (see formannskapsdistrikt law). In 1846, the neighboring Nummedalseidet Municipality to the north was merged with Bedstaden. The spelling was later changed to Beitstad. On 1 January 1904, the northern district of Nummedalseidet (population: 1,368) was separated from Beitstad to create the new Namdalseid Municipality (this was the same area that joined Beitstad Municipality in 1846). The split left Beitstad Municipality with 2,946 inhabitants. On 1 July 1913 another split took place. All of Beitstad Municipality located west of the Beitstadsundet strait and the Hjellbotn bay (population: 993) was separated and became the new Malm Municipality, leaving Beitstad Municipality with a population of 1,934.

During the 1960s, there were many municipal mergers across Norway due to the work of the Schei Committee. On 1 January 1964, a large merger took place with the following municipalities being merged to form a new, larger Steinkjer Municipality.

- Beitstad Municipality (population: 2,563)
- Egge Municipality (population: 3,476)
- Kvam Municipality (population: 1,245)
- Ogndal Municipality (population: 2,678)
- Sparbu Municipality (population: 4,027)
- Stod Municipality (population: 1,268)
- the town of Steinkjer (population: 4,325)

=== Name ===
The municipality (originally the parish) is named after the local Beitstadfjorden (Old Norse: Beitisstǫð). The first element is beitir which was likely the old name for the local Beitstadfjorden. The meaning of this name is uncertain, but it may come from the beita which means "to graze" or "to bite". The last element is stǫð which means "landing place" or "harbour". Historically, the name of the municipality was spelled Bedstaden or Beitstaden. On 3 November 1917, a royal resolution changed the spelling of the name of the municipality to Beitstad, removing the definite form ending -en.

=== Churches ===
The Church of Norway had one parish (sokn) within Beitstad Municipality. At the time of the municipal dissolution, it was part of the Beitstad prestegjeld and the Nord-Innherad prosti (deanery) in the Diocese of Nidaros.

Churches in Beitstad Municipality
Parish (sokn)	Church name	Location of the church	Year built
Beitstad	Beitstad Church	Beitstad	1869
Beitstad	Bartnes Church	Bartnes	1960

== Geography ==
The highest point in the municipality was the 530-metre (1,740 ft) tall mountain Jønnemsklumpen on the border with Kvam Municipality. The municipality was located at the innermost part of the Beitstadfjorden. Malm Municipality was located to the west, Namdalseid Municipality was to the north, Kvam Municipality and Egge Municipality were to the east, and the fjord was to the south.

== Government ==
While it existed, Beitstad Municipality was responsible for primary education (through 10th grade), outpatient health services, senior citizen services, welfare and other social services, zoning, economic development, and municipal roads and utilities. The municipality was governed by a municipal council of directly elected representatives. The mayor was indirectly elected by a vote of the municipal council. The municipality was under the jurisdiction of the Frostating Court of Appeal.

=== Municipal council ===
The municipal council (Herredsstyre) of Beitstad Municipality was made up of 17 representatives that were elected to four year terms. The tables below show the historical composition of the council by political party.

Beitstad heradsstyre 1959–1963
Party name (in Nynorsk)	Number of representatives
Labour Party (Arbeidarpartiet)	7
Centre Party (Senterpartiet)	9
Liberal Party (Venstre)	1
Total number of members:	17
Note: On 1 January 1964, Beitstad Municipality became part of Steinkjer Municipality.

Beitstad heradsstyre 1955–1959
Party name (in Nynorsk)	Number of representatives
Labour Party (Arbeidarpartiet)	7
Farmers' Party (Bondepartiet)	9
Liberal Party (Venstre)	1
Total number of members:	17

Beitstad heradsstyre 1951–1955
Party name (in Nynorsk)	Number of representatives
Labour Party (Arbeidarpartiet)	8
Farmers' Party (Bondepartiet)	6
Liberal Party (Venstre)	2
Total number of members:	16

Beitstad heradsstyre 1947–1951
Party name (in Nynorsk)	Number of representatives
Labour Party (Arbeidarpartiet)	7
Farmers' Party (Bondepartiet)	8
Liberal Party (Venstre)	1
Total number of members:	16

Beitstad heradsstyre 1945–1947
Party name (in Nynorsk)	Number of representatives
Labour Party (Arbeidarpartiet)	8
Farmers' Party (Bondepartiet)	6
Liberal Party (Venstre)	2
Total number of members:	16

Beitstad heradsstyre 1937–1941*
Party name (in Nynorsk)	Number of representatives
Labour Party (Arbeidarpartiet)	7
Farmers' Party (Bondepartiet)	7
Liberal Party (Venstre)	2
Total number of members:	16
Note: Due to the German occupation of Norway during World War II, no elections were held for new municipal councils until after the war ended in 1945.

=== Mayors ===
The mayor (Nynorsk: ordførar) of Beitstad Municipality was the political leader of the municipality and the chairperson of the municipal council. Here is a list of people who held this position:

- 1838–1841: Jakob Velde
- 1842–1845: Henrik Foosnæs
- 1846–1853: Jakob Velde
- 1854–1855: Morten Elden
- 1856–1859: Ole S. Welde
- 1860–1867: Jakob Velde
- 1868–1873: Ole S. Welde (V)
- 1874–1877: Morten Elden (V)
- 1878–1879: Christoffer Hjelde (V)
- 1880–1910: Hans Konrad Foosnæs (V)
- 1911–1913: Odin Kvam (V)
- 1914–1916: Hans Konrad Foosnæs (V)
- 1917–1919: Odin Kvam (V)
- 1920–1925: Edvard Stamnæs (Bp)
- 1926–1928: Kristoffer Brækken (V)
- 1929–1934: Edvard Stamnæs (Bp)
- 1935–1940: Henrik Bartnes (Bp)
- 1941–1945: Anton Welde (NS)
- 1945–1945: Henrik Bartnes (Bp)
- 1946–1947: Odin Rostad (Ap)
- 1948–1951: Einar Kvam (Bp)
- 1952–1955: Odin Rostad (Ap)
- 1956–1958: Einar Kvam (Bp)
- 1959–1963: Knut Aas (Sp)

== See also ==
- List of former municipalities of Norway
