= Hans Ystgaard =

Norwegian politician (1882–1953)

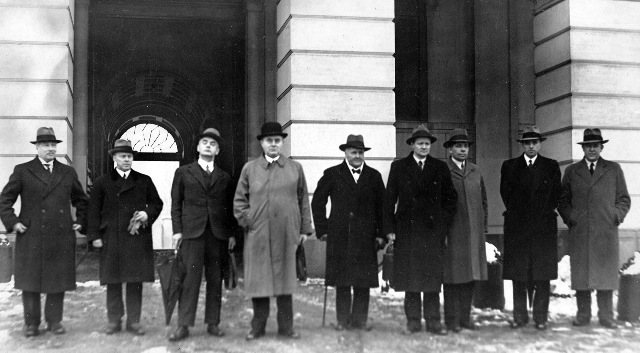
- Ystgaard to the right of Prime Minister Nygaardsvold (centre).

Minister of Agriculture
- In office 20 March 1935 – 25 June 1945
- Prime Minister: Johan Nygaardsvold
- Preceded by: Håkon Five
- Succeeded by: Einar Frogner

Mayor of Sparbu Municipality
- In office 1 January 1946 – 31 December 1947
- Preceded by: Erling Moen
- Succeeded by: Harald Nordberg
- In office 1 January 1935 – 20 March 1935
- Preceded by: Fridtjof Rannem
- Succeeded by: Ole K. Nordgård

Personal details
- Born: 19 February 1882 Sparbu Municipality, Nordre Trondheim, Sweden-Norway
- Died: 25 November 1953 (aged 71) Sparbu Municipality, Nord-Trøndelag, Norway
- Party: Labour
- Children: Ole Martin Ystgaard

Hans Ystgaard (19 February 1882 – 25 November 1953) was a Norwegian politician of the Norwegian Labour Party. He served as the Norwegian Minister of Agriculture from 1935 to 1945, and is to date the longest serving minister in said post. In local politics, he served as mayor of Sparbu Municipality from January until his appointment as agriculture minister in March 1935, and again from 1946 to 1947.
