= Egge Municipality =

Former municipality in Trøndelag, Norway

Egge Municipality Egge herad
- Former municipality
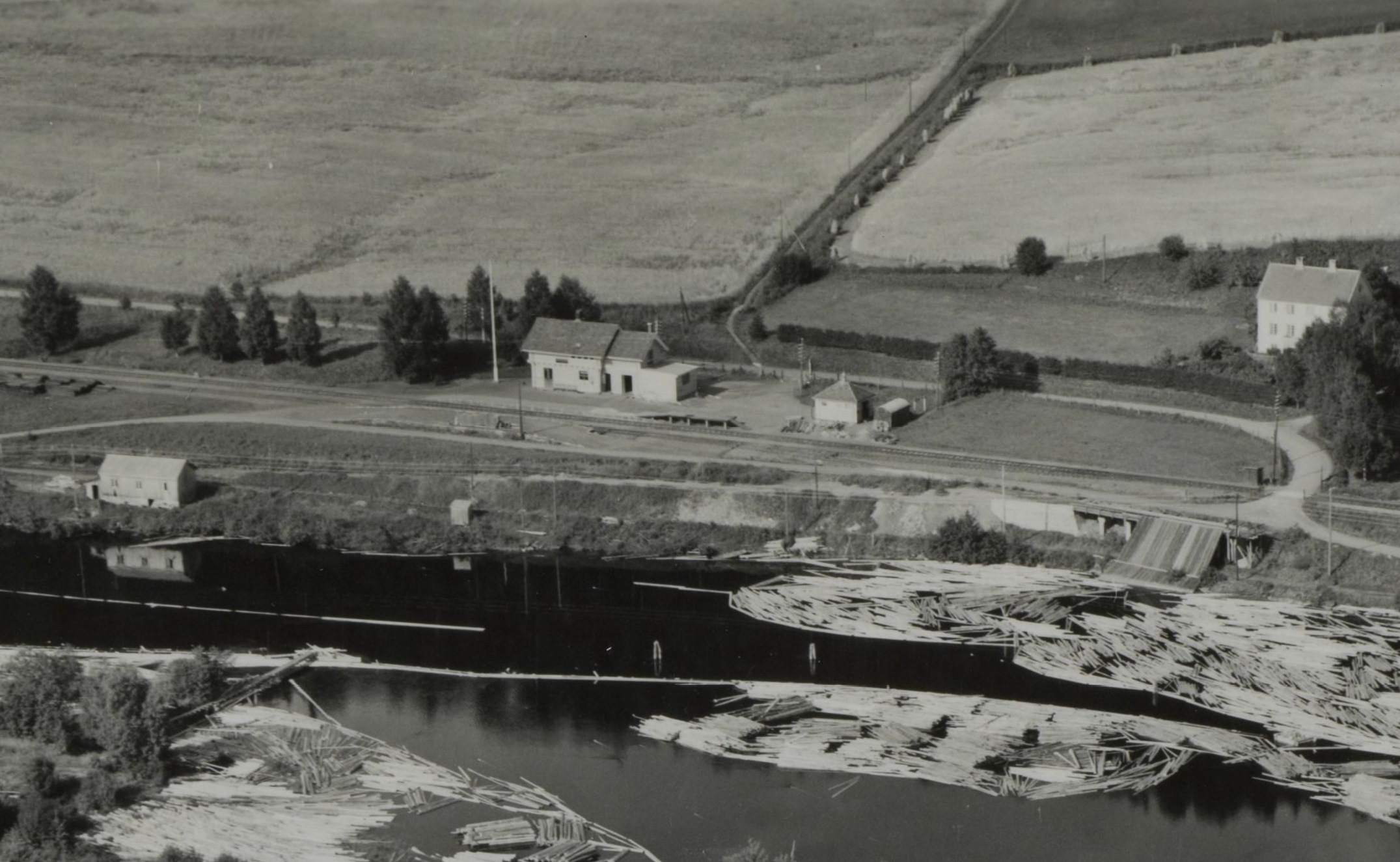
- Byafossen train station (1951)

- Nord-Trøndelag within Norway

- Egge within Nord-Trøndelag
- Coordinates: 64°01′23″N 11°28′28″E
- Country: Norway
- County: Nord-Trøndelag
- District: Innherred
- Established: 1 Jan 1869
  - Preceded by: Stod Municipality
- Disestablished: 1 Jan 1964
  - Succeeded by: Steinkjer Municipality
- Administrative centre: Egge

Government
  - Mayor (1946–1963): Karl Dahl (Ap)

Area (upon dissolution)
  - Total: 51.3 km^{2} (19.8 sq mi)
  - Rank: #587 in Norway
- Highest elevation: 304 m (997 ft)

Population (1963)
  - Total: 3,335
  - Rank: #272 in Norway
  - Density: 65/km^{2} (170/sq mi)
  - Change (10 years): ▲ +22.7%
- Demonym: Egge-folk

Official language
  - Norwegian form: Nynorsk
- Time zone: UTC+01:00 (CET)
  - Summer (DST): UTC+02:00 (CEST)
- ISO 3166 code: NO-1733

Egge is a former municipality in what was Nord-Trøndelag county, Norway. The 51-square-kilometre (20 sq mi) municipality existed from 1869 until 1964. It included the land just north of the town of Steinkjer in what is now Steinkjer Municipality in Trøndelag county. The small municipality was south of the lake Snåsavatnet, west of the lake Fossemvatnet, and east of Beitstad Municipality. The main church for the municipality was Egge Church, just north of the town of Steinkjer.

Prior to its dissolution in 1963, the 51-square-kilometre (20 sq mi) municipality was the 587th largest by area out of the 689 municipalities in Norway. Egge Municipality was the 272nd most populous municipality in Norway with a population of about 3,335. The municipality's population density was 65 inhabitants per square kilometre (170/sq mi) and its population had increased by 22.7% over the previous 10-year period.

== General information ==
The parish of Egge was established as a municipality on 1 January 1869 when it was separated from the large Stod Municipality. Initially, Egge Municipality had a population of 941. In 1948, a small part of Egge Municipality (population: 70) was transferred to the neighboring town of Steinkjer.

On 1 January 1964, a large municipal merger took place involving six rural municipalities and the town of Steinkjer. The following places were merged to form a new, larger Steinkjer Municipality:

- the town of Steinkjer (population: 4,325)
- Sparbu Municipality (population: 4,027)
- Egge Municipality (population: 3,476)
- Ogndal Municipality (population: 2,678)
- Beitstad Municipality (population: 2,563)
- Stod Municipality (population: 1,268)
- Kvam Municipality (population: 1,245)

=== Name ===
The municipality (originally the parish) is named after the old Egge farm (Old Norse: Egg) since the first Egge Church was built there. The name is the dative case of the word egg which means "edge" (as in the edge of a knife), likely representing the fact that the old Egge farm is located on long soil ridge.

=== Churches ===
The Church of Norway had one parish (sokn) within Egge Municipality. At the time of the municipal dissolution, it was part of the Steinkjer prestegjeld and the Nord-Innherad prosti (deanery) in the Diocese of Nidaros.

Churches in Egge Municipality
Parish (sokn)	Church name	Location of the church	Year built
Egge	Egge Church	Egge, just north of Steinkjer	1767

== Geography ==
Egge Municipality was located north of the town of Steinkjer. It was bordered by Beitstad Municipality and Kvam Municipality to the north, Stod Municipality to the east, and Ogndal Municipality to the southeast. The highest point in the municipality was the 304-metre (997 ft) tall mountain Byafjell.

== Government ==
While it existed, Egge Municipality was responsible for primary education (through 10th grade), outpatient health services, senior citizen services, welfare and other social services, zoning, economic development, and municipal roads and utilities. The municipality was governed by a municipal council of directly elected representatives. The mayor was indirectly elected by a vote of the municipal council. The municipality was under the jurisdiction of the Frostating Court of Appeal.

=== Municipal council ===
The municipal council (Herredsstyre) of Egge Municipality was made up of representatives that were elected to four year terms. The tables below show the historical composition of the council by political party.

Egge heradsstyre 1959–1963
Party name (in Nynorsk)	Number of representatives
Labour Party (Arbeidarpartiet)	9
Centre Party (Senterpartiet)	2
Liberal Party (Venstre)	2
Total number of members:	13

Egge heradsstyre 1955–1959
Party name (in Nynorsk)	Number of representatives
Labour Party (Arbeidarpartiet)	9
Conservative Party (Høgre)	1
Farmers' Party (Bondepartiet)	1
Liberal Party (Venstre)	2
Total number of members:	13

Egge heradsstyre 1951–1955
Party name (in Nynorsk)	Number of representatives
Labour Party (Arbeidarpartiet)	8
Farmers' Party (Bondepartiet)	1
Liberal Party (Venstre)	3
Total number of members:	12

Egge heradsstyre 1947–1951
Party name (in Nynorsk)	Number of representatives
Labour Party (Arbeidarpartiet)	7
Communist Party (Kommunistiske Parti)	2
Farmers' Party (Bondepartiet)	1
Liberal Party (Venstre)	2
Total number of members:	12

Egge heradsstyre 1945–1947
Party name (in Nynorsk)	Number of representatives
Labour Party (Arbeidarpartiet)	5
Communist Party (Kommunistiske Parti)	3
Farmers' Party (Bondepartiet)	1
Liberal Party (Venstre)	3
Total number of members:	12

Egge heradsstyre 1937–1941*
Party name (in Nynorsk)	Number of representatives
Labour Party (Arbeidarpartiet)	6
Communist Party (Kommunistiske Parti)	1
Farmers' Party (Bondepartiet)	2
Liberal Party (Venstre)	3
Total number of members:	12
Note: Due to the German occupation of Norway during World War II, no elections were held for new municipal councils until after the war ended in 1945.

=== Mayors ===
The mayor (Nynorsk: ordførar) of Egge Municipality was the political leader of the municipality and the chairperson of the municipal council. Here is a list of people who held this position:

- 1869–1885: Ole Anton Qvam (V)
- 1886–1886: Peter Østby
- 1887–1889: Casper Lian
- 1890–1893: Martinus Utheim (V)
- 1894–1895: Ole Anton Qvam (V)
- 1896–1897: Jakob Gram (H)
- 1898–1905: Peder T. Dyrstad (V)
- 1906–1919: Paul Saur (V)
- 1920–1922: Nils Taraldsen (RF)
- 1923–1925: Trygve Taraldsen (RF)
- 1926–1931: Johan Nordgård (Ap)
- 1932–1934: John Næsvold (Ap)
- 1935–1937: Johan Nordgård (Ap)
- 1938–1941: Henry Haagensli (Ap)
- 1941–1945: Tormod Saur (NS)
- 1945–1945: Henry Haagensli (Ap)
- 1946–1963: Karl Dahl (Ap)

== See also ==
- List of former municipalities of Norway
