= Sparbu Municipality =

Former municipality in Trøndelag, Norway

Sparbu Municipality Sparbu kommune
- Former municipality
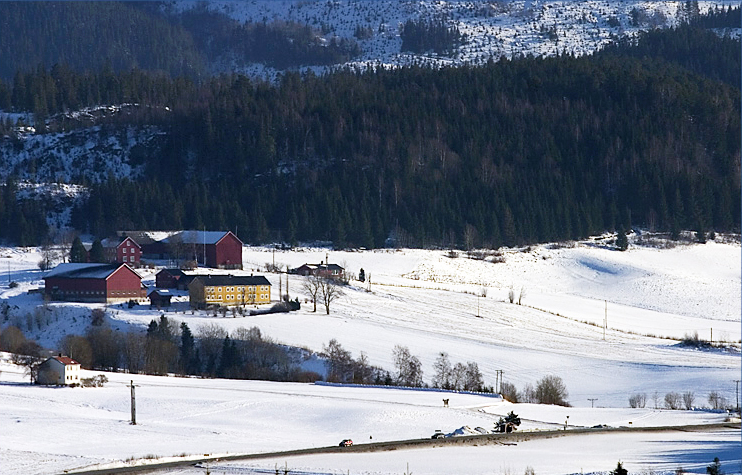
- View of the Vådal area in southern Sparbu

- Nord-Trøndelag within Norway

- Sparbu within Nord-Trøndelag
- Coordinates: 63°55′08″N 11°25′58″E
- Country: Norway
- County: Nord-Trøndelag
- District: Innherred
- Established: 1 Jan 1838
  - Created as: Formannskapsdistrikt
- Disestablished: 1 Jan 1964
  - Succeeded by: Steinkjer Municipality
- Administrative centre: Sparbu

Government
  - Mayor (1960–1963): Karl Tørhaug (Ap)

Area (upon dissolution)
  - Total: 258.8 km^{2} (99.9 sq mi)
  - Rank: #317 in Norway
- Highest elevation: 568.6 m (1,865 ft)

Population (1963)
  - Total: 3,995
  - Rank: #217 in Norway
  - Density: 15.4/km^{2} (40/sq mi)
  - Change (10 years): ▲ +7.2%
- Demonym: Sparbygg

Official language
  - Norwegian form: Nynorsk
- Time zone: UTC+01:00 (CET)
  - Summer (DST): UTC+02:00 (CEST)
- ISO 3166 code: NO-1731

Sparbu is a former municipality in the old Nord-Trøndelag county, Norway. The 259-square-kilometre (100 sq mi) municipality existed from 1838 until its dissolution in 1964. It encompassed the southwestern part of what is now Steinkjer Municipality, south of the town of Steinkjer, east of the Børgin bay off the Trondheimsfjorden, and southwest of the Ogndalen valley. The administrative centre was the village of Sparbu.

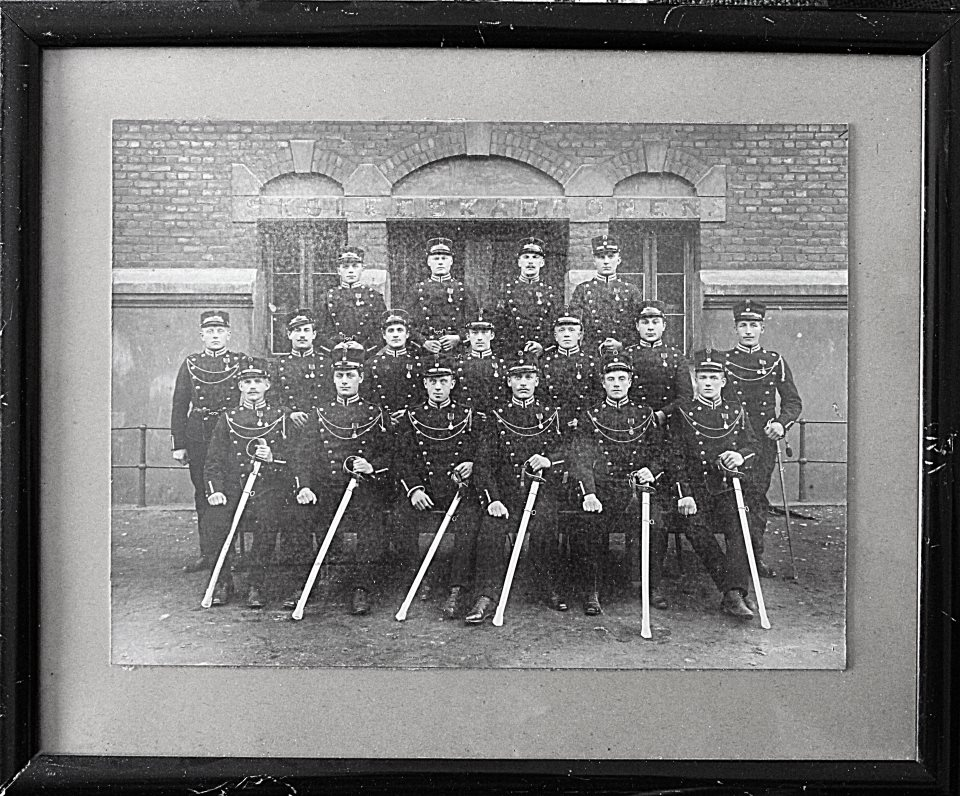
View of the Sparbu squadron of the Norwegian military (c. 1905)

Prior to its dissolution in 1963, the 259-square-kilometre (100 sq mi) municipality was the 317th largest by area out of the 689 municipalities in Norway. Sparbu Municipality was the 217th most populous municipality in Norway with a population of about 3,995. The municipality's population density was 15.4 inhabitants per square kilometre (40/sq mi) and its population had increased by 7.2% over the previous 10-year period.

== General information ==
The parish of Sparbu was established as a municipality on 1 January 1838 (see formannskapsdistrikt law). The eastern Ogndalen valley (population: 1,441) was separated from Sparbu Municipality on 1 January 1885 to form the new Skei Municipality (later this was renamed Ogndal Municipality). This left Sparbu Municipality with 2,842 residents.

On 1 January 1964, a large municipal merger took place involving six rural municipalities and the town of Steinkjer. The following places were merged to form a new, larger Steinkjer Municipality:

- the town of Steinkjer (population: 4,325)
- Sparbu Municipality (population: 4,027)
- Egge Municipality (population: 3,476)
- Ogndal Municipality (population: 2,678)
- Beitstad Municipality (population: 2,563)
- Stod Municipality (population: 1,268)
- Kvam Municipality (population: 1,245)

=== Name ===
The municipality (originally the parish) is named an old name for the area (Old Norse: Sparabú). The first element is spara which has an uncertain meaning, however it is possible that it means "something excellent" or "something one saves for". The last element is bú which means "household" or "farm". Historically, the name was spelled Sparbuen (using the definite singular form).

=== Churches ===
The Church of Norway had one parish (sokn) within Sparbu Municipality. At the time of the municipal dissolution, it was part of the Sparbu prestegjeld and the Nord-Innherad prosti (deanery) in the Diocese of Nidaros.

Churches in Sparbu Municipality
Parish (sokn)	Church name	Location of the church	Year built
Henning	Henning Church	Henning	1872
Mære	Mære Church	Mære	c. 1150

== Geography ==
Sparbu Municipality was located south of the town of Steinkjer. It was bordered by Ogndal Municipality to the north, Verdal Municipality to the southeast, Røra Municipality to the south, and Inderøy Municipality and Sandvollan Municipality to the west. The highest point in the municipality was the 568.6-metre (1,865 ft) tall mountain Selisteinen, near the border with Verdal Municipality.

== Government ==
While it existed, Sparbu Municipality was responsible for primary education (through 10th grade), outpatient health services, senior citizen services, welfare and other social services, zoning, economic development, and municipal roads and utilities. The municipality was governed by a municipal council of directly elected representatives. The mayor was indirectly elected by a vote of the municipal council. The municipality was under the jurisdiction of the Frostating Court of Appeal.

=== Municipal council ===
The municipal council (Herredsstyre) of Sparbu Municipality was made up of representatives that were elected to four year terms. The tables below show the historical composition of the council by political party.

Sparbu heradsstyre 1959–1963
Party name (in Nynorsk)	Number of representatives
Labour Party (Arbeidarpartiet)	11
Centre Party (Senterpartiet)	9
Liberal Party (Venstre)	1
Total number of members:	21

Sparbu heradsstyre 1955–1959
Party name (in Nynorsk)	Number of representatives
Labour Party (Arbeidarpartiet)	11
Farmers' Party (Bondepartiet)	9
Liberal Party (Venstre)	1
Total number of members:	21

Sparbu heradsstyre 1951–1955
Party name (in Nynorsk)	Number of representatives
Labour Party (Arbeidarpartiet)	11
Farmers' Party (Bondepartiet)	8
Liberal Party (Venstre)	1
Total number of members:	20

Sparbu heradsstyre 1947–1951
Party name (in Nynorsk)	Number of representatives
Labour Party (Arbeidarpartiet)	11
Farmers' Party (Bondepartiet)	8
Liberal Party (Venstre)	1
Total number of members:	20

Sparbu heradsstyre 1945–1947
Party name (in Nynorsk)	Number of representatives
Labour Party (Arbeidarpartiet)	11
Farmers' Party (Bondepartiet)	7
Liberal Party (Venstre)	2
Total number of members:	20

Sparbu heradsstyre 1937–1941*
Party name (in Nynorsk)	Number of representatives
Labour Party (Arbeidarpartiet)	9
Farmers' Party (Bondepartiet)	9
Liberal Party (Venstre)	2
Total number of members:	20
Note: Due to the German occupation of Norway during World War II, no elections were held for new municipal councils until after the war ended in 1945.

=== Mayors ===
The mayor (Nynorsk: ordførar) of Sparbu Municipality was the political leader of the municipality and the chairperson of the municipal council. Here is a list of people who held this position:

- 1837–1836: Johan Christian Schiefloe
- 1840–1843: Andreas Erlandsen
- 1844–1845: Lars Smith
- 1846–1849: Andreas Erlandsen
- 1850–1851: Erik Dalum
- 1852–1857: Johan Nøst
- 1858–1861: Erik Dalum
- 1862–1869: Johan Petter Brandsegg
- 1870–1871: Andreas Schult
- 1872–1877: Johan Petter Brandsegg
- 1878–1889: Peter O. Skjeflo (V)
- 1890–1891: Lornts G. Strugstad
- 1892–1893: Jakob Oksur
- 1894–1895: Johan Kr. Braset
- 1896–1898: Hilmar Lønnum
- 1899–1900: Johannes Bragstad (V)
- 1900–1901: Ole M. Eid (V)
- 1902–1904: Johannes Okkehaug (V)
- 1905–1907: Bertinus Rannem (H)
- 1908–1910: Johannes Okkehaug (V)
- 1911–1913: Bertinus Rannem (H)
- 1914–1916: Johannes Okkehaug (V)
- 1917–1919: Peer M. Schiefloe (Ap)
- 1920–1922: John Tanem (V)
- 1923–1923: Bertinus Rannem (H)
- 1923–1925: Per Lein (Bp)
- 1926–1928: Fridtjof Rannem (Bp)
- 1929–1931: Eystein Utheim (Bp)
- 1932–1934: Fridtjof Rannem (Bp)
- 1935–1935: Hans Ystgaard (Ap)
- 1935–1937: Ole K. Nordgård (Ap)
- 1938–1940: Eystein Utheim (Bp)
- 1945–1945: Fridtjof Rannem (Bp)
- 1945–1945: Erling Moen (Bp)
- 1946–1947: Hans Ystgaard (Ap)
- 1948–1959: Harald Nordberg (Ap)
- 1960–1963: Karl Tørhaug (Ap)

== See also ==
- List of former municipalities of Norway
