= Formannskapsdistrikt =

Name of local self-governing municipality

Formannskapsdistrikt (Urban East Norwegian: [ˈfɔ̂rmɑnskɑːpsdɪˌstrɪkt]) was the name of a Norwegian self-governing municipality. The name was used from the establishment these municipalities in 1838 until the name fell out of use in 1863.

The municipalities had their legal basis from two laws enacted on 14 January 1837. The laws established two types of formannskapsdistrikt; one for cities (Norwegian: kjøpstad) and one for rural districts (Norwegian: landdistrikt). These districts were mostly based on the former parishes. City municipalities had a monopoly on trade in both the municipality and for surrounding districts.

Each district was to elect two councils that governed the municipality. The upper council was called formannskap and the lower council was called representantskap. The chairman of this council also represented the municipality at the county level.

The distinction between cities and rural districts existed until it was gradually replaced by 1995. Formannskap is still used as name of the most important council in Norwegian municipalities.

In total, 396 municipalities were created under these laws.

Number of districts	Type of district
25	City/town
3	City/town with a surrounding rural district
12	Lading places (ladested)
1	Rural district consisting of two (very small) seaports
3	Rural districts with dependent small seaports
1	Port and naval base
1	Rural district with dependent mining town
350	Rural districts
See below for a list of all districts, broken down by county.

== History ==
The establishment of self-governing municipalities in Norway was preceded by significant political strife. In the 1830s, the government attempted to decrease local self-governance. Following this, the peasants in parliament presented a radical decentralisation proposal that would have moved all local responsibilities over to new formannskap, that were to be governed by a mix of direct democracy and representative democracy. After negotiations with the government, all instances of direct democracy were removed and several responsibilities were moved to the central government. The moderated laws passed on 14 January 1837.

The introduction of self government in rural districts was a major political change. The Norwegian peasant culture that emerged came to serve as a symbol of nationalist resistance to the forced union with Sweden. The legislation of 1837 gave both the towns and the rural areas the same institutions: a minor change for the town, but a major advance for the rural communities. The significance of this legislation is hailed by a nationalistic historian, Ernst Sars:

"So great an advance in relation to the political development of the people that on that account it can almost be placed alongside the Constitution. By it the free constitution was given a broad basis to rest upon and be nourished from, and became related to the daily life and activity of the people in such a way that its principles could penetrate everywhere and be most effectively acquired... There was at that time scarcely any European state where local self-government was so well organized and so widely ramified as it became in Norway through the legislation of 1837."

In 1863, the land registration law superseded the formannsskapsdistrikt by introduction of a new designation: city municipality (Norwegian: bykommune) and rural municipality (Norwegian: herredskommune).

In 1936, almost a century later, a local self-government district law was enacted which created 682 rural municipalities (landkommuner) and 65 city municipalities (bykommuner) in Norway. Among the city municipalities, 43 had the status of market town (Norwegian: kjøpstad) and 22 were recognized harbours for trade (Nynorsk: ladestad and Bokmål: ladested).

During the last half of the 20th century, the distinction between the different types of municipalities gradually vanished, and in 1995, legislation finally eliminated all distinctions.

== List of districts ==
This is a list of the districts that were initially created on 1 January 1838. The original spellings have been used (many spellings have changed since that time. For a present list of current municipalities, see the List of municipalities of Norway.

Amt (County)	City or town	Lading place	Rural district	Total
Smaalehnenes Amt	Frederiksstad, Frederikshald, Moss	–	Aremark, Askim, Berg, Borge, Eidsberg, Glemminge, Haabøl, Hvaler, Id, Mosse Landdistrict, Onsø, Rakkestad, Rygge, Rødenæs, Raade, Skiptvet, Skjeberg, Spydeberg, Trygstad, Tune, Vaaler	24
Agershuus Amt	–	Drøbak, Soon og Hølen (Note: Consisting of two minor lading places.)	Aker, Asker, Bærum, Eidsvold, Enebak, Fet, Frogn, Gjerdrum, Hurdalen, Høland, Kraakstad, Nannestad, Nitedal, Næs, Næsodden, Skedsmo, Sørum, Ullensaker, Urskog, Vestby with Hvidsteen, (Note: Rural districts with dependent lading places.) Aas	23
Christiania Amt (Note: Part of Agershuus Amt until 1842)	Christiania	–	–	1
Hedemarkens Amt	–	–	Elverum, Grue, Hof, Kvikne, Løiten, Nordre Odalen, Næs, Rendalen, Ringsaker, Romedal, Stange, Store Elvedalen, Søndre Odalen, Tolgen, Trysil, Tønsæt, Vang, Vinger, Aamot	19
Christians Amt	Lillehammer	–	Birid, Fron, Faaberg, Gausdal, Gran, Jævnaker, Land, Lesje, Lom, Nordre Aurdal, Ringebu, Slidre, Søndre Aurdal, Vang, Vardal, Vestre Toten, Vaage, Øier, Østre Toten	20
Budskeruds Amt	Drammen, Kongsberg	–	Eker, Flesberg, Gol, Hole, Hurum, Lier, Modum, Norderhov, Næs, Rollag, Røken, Sandsvær, Sigdal, Strømsgodset, Aal	17
Jarlsberg og Laurvigs Amt	Holmestrand, Laurvig, Tønsberg	Sandefjord, Aasgaardstrand	Anneboe, Borre, Botne, Brunlagnæs, Frederiksværn, (Note: Port and naval base.) Hedrum, Hof, Laurdal, Nøtterøe, Ramnæs, Sande, Sandeherred, Skouger, Stokke, Strømmen, Sæm, Tjølling, Tjømø, Vaale	24
Bratsbergs Amt	Kragerøe, Porsgrund, Skien	Brevig, Langesund	Bamble with Stathelle, Bø, Drangedal, Eidanger, Gjerpen, Hitterdal, Hjerdal, Holden, Hvidesøe, Laurdal, Mo, Moland, Nissedal, Sannikedal, Seufde, Sillejord, Slemdal, Solum, Tind, Vinje	25
Nedenæs og Raabygdelaugets Amt	Arendal, Grømstad, Østerriisøer	Lillesand, Tvedestrand	Birkenæs, Bygland, Dybvaag, Eide, Evje og Veigusdal, Gjerrestad, Heirefos, Holt, Hordnæs og Iveland, Landvig, Omlid, Søndeløv, Valle, Vegaardsheien, Vestre Moland, Øiestad, Østre Moland, Aaseral	23
Lister og Mandals Amt	Christianssand	Farsund, Flekkefjord, Mandal	Bjelland og Grindem, Finsland, Fjotland, Gyland, Mandals Landdistrict, Herod, Holme, Hegebostad, Lyngdal, Nedre Qvinnesdal, Næs og Hitterø, Oddernæs, Søgne, Tved, Undal, Vandsøe, Øslebø og Løvdal, Østre Bakke, Øvrebøe	23
Stavanger Amt	Stavanger	Egersund	Avaldsnæs, Birkrem, Egersund landdistrikt, Finnø, Gjæsdal, Helleland, Heskestad, Hetland, Hjelmeland, Høiland, Haa, Haaland, Jælse, Klep, Lunde, Nærstrand, Rennesø, Skjold, Skudesnæs, Soggendal with Sogndalstrand, Strand, Suledal, Time, Torvestad, Vestre Bakke, Vikedal	28
Søndre Bergenhuus Amt	–	–	Askøen, Bergens Landdistrict, Eid, Etne, Fanøe, Findaas, Fjeld, Fjeldberg, Graven, Hammer, Hosanger, Hougs, Kingservig, Lindaas, Manger, Ous, Qvindherred, Røldal, Skaanevig, Storøen, Strandebarm, Sund, Tysnæs, Vigøer, Voss, Aarstad	26
Bergen Amt	Bergen	–	–	1
Nordre Bergenhuus Amt	–	–	Askevold, Davigen, Eid, Evindvig, Førde, Gloppen, Hafsloe, Indre Holmedal, Indvigen, Justedal, Jølster, Kind, Ladvig, Leganger, Leirdal, Lyster, Selløe, Sogndal, Urland, Vefring, Viig, Yttre Holmedal	22
Romsdals Amt	Christianssund, Molde	Aalesund	Agerøe, Boe, Bolsøe, Borgund, Edøen, Fredøe, Grytten, Halse, Haram, Herrøe, Jørringfjord, Næsset, Nordalen, Oure, Qvernæs, Stangvig, Strand, Sunddalen, Sundelven, Surendal, Thingvold, Ulfsteen, Vandelven, Vedøe, Vestnæs, Volden, Øre, Ørskoug	31
Søndre Throndhjems Amt	Throndhjem	–	Bjørnøer, Bynæsset, Børsen, Hevne, Hitteren, Holtaalen, Klæboe, Leenstranden, Meldal, Melhuus, Opdal, Ørkedal, Røraas, (Note: Rural district with dependent mining town) Stadsbygden, Strinden, Støren, Sælboe, Ørland, Aafjorden	20
Nordre Throndhjems Amt	Levanger	–	Bedstaden, Fosnæs, Frosten, Grogn, Inderøen, Kolvereid, Lexvigen, Nummedalseidet, Nærøen, Overhalden, Skogn, Snaasen, Sparboen, Stod, Størdal, Vemundvig, Værdalen, Ytterøen, Aasen	21
Nordlands Amt	Bodøe	–	Alstahoug, Bindalen, Bodøe Landdistrict, Borge, Brønøe, Buxnæs, Bøe, Dverberg, Flakstad, Folden, Gilleskaal, Hammerøe, Hassel, Lurøe, Lødingen, Næsne, Ofoden, Ranen, Rødøe, Saltdalen, Skjærstad, Stegen, Vefsen, Vægøe, Værøe, Vaagen, Øxnæs	29
Tromsøe Amt (Note: Part of Finmarkens Amt until 1866.)	Tromsøe	–	Berg, Ibbestad, Karlsøe, Qvæfjord, Lenvig, Lyngen, Sand, Skjervøe, Tranøe, Tromsøe Landdistrict, Trondenæs	12
Finmarkens Amt	Hammerfest, (Note: Cities/towns with rural districts); Vadsøe, Vardøe	–	Alten, Kistrand, Lebesbye, Loppen, Maasø	8
Grand totals	25 + 3	12 + 1	350 + 3 + 1 + 1	396
Footnotes				
