= Skei Church =

Church in Trøndelag, Norway

- Skei kirke
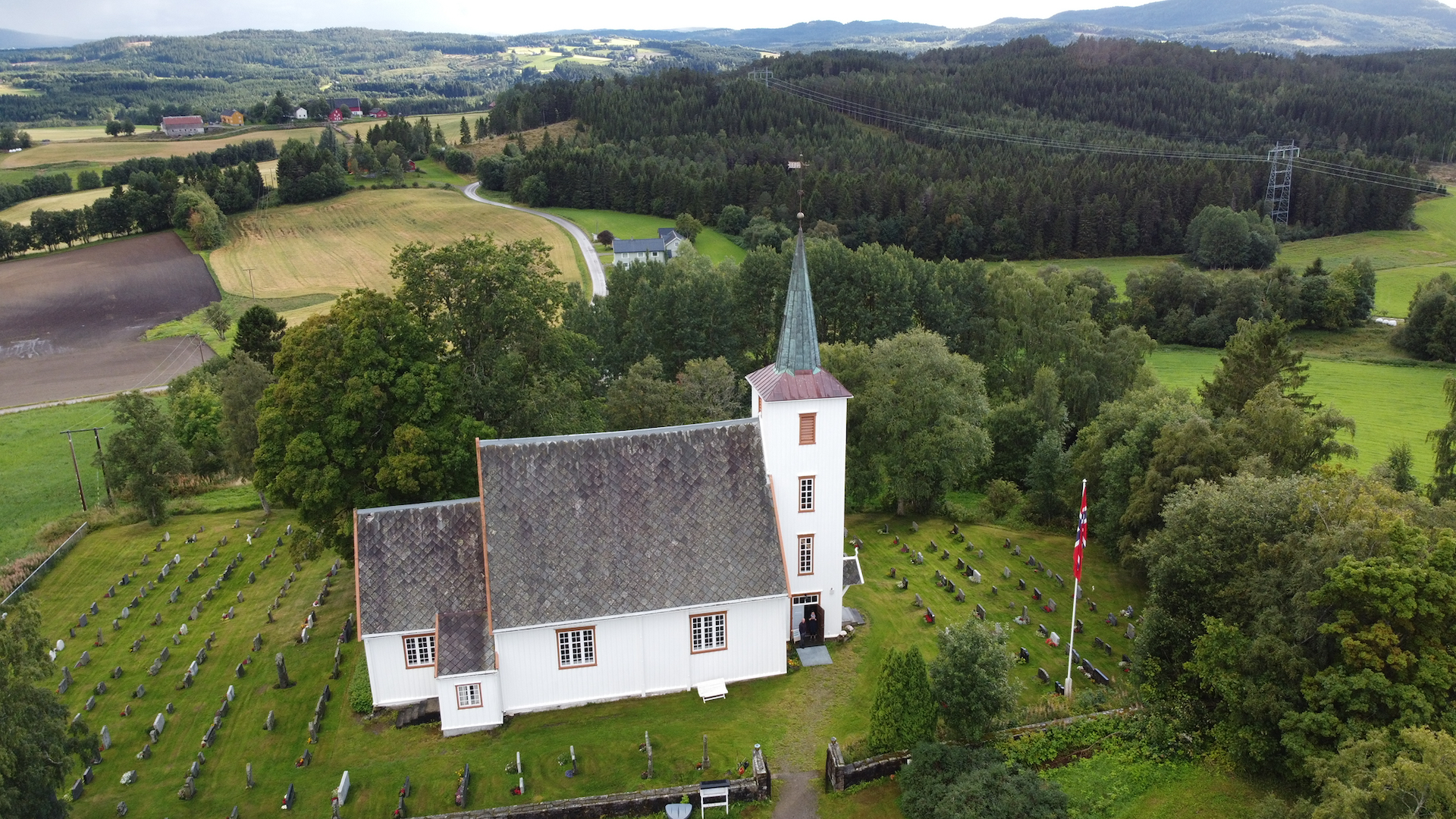
- View of the church
- Skei Church
- 64.02005547°N 11.63126796°E
- Location: Steinkjer Municipality, Trøndelag
- Country: Norway
- Denomination: Church of Norway
- Churchmanship: Evangelical Lutheran

History
- Status: Parish church
- Founded: 1664
- Consecrated: 1664

Architecture
- Functional status: Active
- Architectural type: Long church
- Completed: 1664 (362 years ago)

Specifications
- Capacity: 290
- Materials: Wood

Administration
- Diocese: Nidaros bispedømme
- Deanery: Stiklestad prosti
- Parish: Ogndal
- Norwegian Cultural Heritage Site
- Type: Church
- Status: Automatically protected
- ID: 85452

Skei Church (Norwegian: Skei kirke) is a parish church of the Church of Norway in Steinkjer Municipality in Trøndelag county, Norway. It is located in the village of Skei. It is the main church for the Ogndal parish which is part of the Stiklestad prosti (deanery) in the Diocese of Nidaros. The white, wooden church was built in a long church style in 1664 using plans drawn up by an unknown architect. The church seats about 290 people.

== History ==
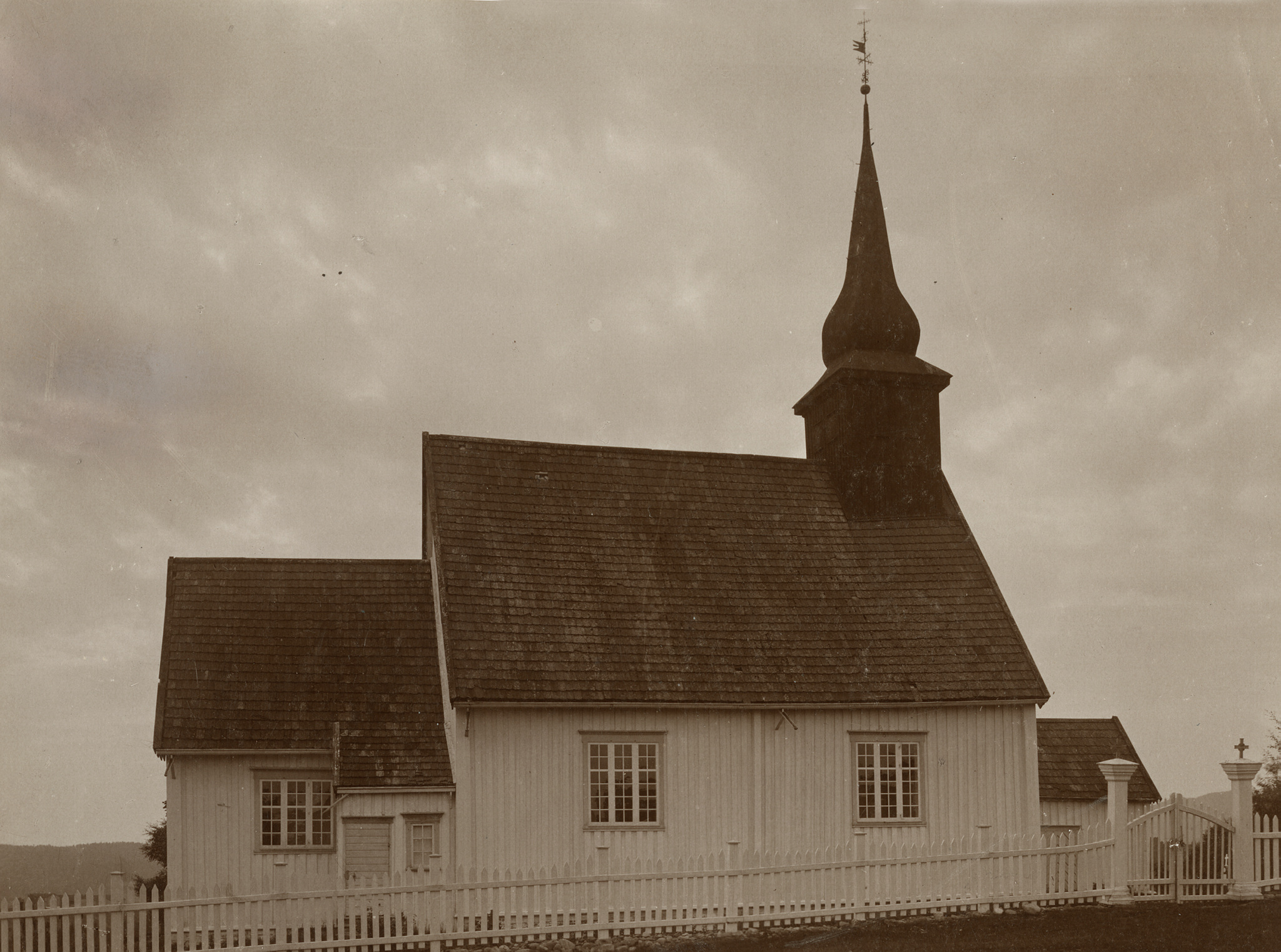
View of the church (before 1911)

It is not known exactly when the first church was built at Skei, but in existing historical records from 1490 "Skeide Sokn" is mentioned, and Olav Engelbrektsson has in its Domesday Book from 1533 referred to the farm "church Skeiid". Skei Church is mentioned in connection with the will of the Crown (the King's property) by the Reformation (1536). The name Skei suggests that this place may have been a meeting place also in pre-Christian times. Skei means "contest or the event center," which probably suggests something about the use, even if the site is not known as a place of worship. The existing baptismal font in the church today is dated to the years 1250-1275, so it is likely that the first church was built here during the 13th century on the same site as the present building. In 1664, the old stave church was torn down and replaced with a new building on the same site. The new building was described as being "spacious" and having a very nice tower.

In 1725, the church was sold during the Norwegian church auction, and the first private owner, Colonel Claus Janus Gedde who also bought Mære Church and Henning Church. Over the next 75 years, the church was owned in turn by Casper Heirich von Westerwald (1735-1772), Andrew Bull (owner for only two days), Jorgen Urne Westerwaldt (1772-1776), Theodore Bergmann Holst (1776-1786), and David Andrew Gram (1786-1803). In 1803, the local congregation bought the church for 3,150 rigsdalers.

In 1885, a new sacristy was constructed. On 1 January 1901, the local municipality took over the ownership of the church. In 1911, the church was renovated. The old tower was torn down and a new tower on the west end of the building was constructed. Inside, the ceiling height was raised about 1.5 metres (4 ft 11 in). Electric lights were added in the 1920s and electric heat was added in 1955.

== See also ==
- List of churches in Nidaros
