= KBHM =

- Kimball, Nebraska; United States
- Frequency: 88.3 MHz

Programming
- Format: Defunct

Ownership
- Owner: Cedar Cove Broadcasting, Inc.

History
- First air date: May 23, 2008
- Last air date: 2015
- Former call signs: KEZF (2008–2009); KGCQ (2009–2010); KVAM (2010–2015)

Technical information
- Licensing authority: FCC
- Facility ID: 177286
- Class: A
- ERP: 510 watts
- HAAT: 86 meters
- Transmitter coordinates: 41°11′36″N 103°31′45″W

Links
- Public license information: Public file; LMS

KBHM (88.3 FM) was a radio station formerly licensed to Kimball, Nebraska, United States. The station was owned by Cedar Cove Broadcasting, Inc.

== History ==
The station went on the air as KEZF on 2008-05-23. On 2009-02-16, the station changed its call sign to KGCQ, on 2010-11-15 to KVAM, and on 2015-06-12 to KBHM.

Owner Cedar Cove Broadcasting surrendered KBHM's license to the Federal Communications Commission (FCC) on June 25, 2015. The FCC cancelled it the following day.
