= Steinkjer (town) =

Town in Trøndelag, Norway

Steinkjer: Steinkjer (Norwegian); Stïentje (Southern Sami)
- Town/City
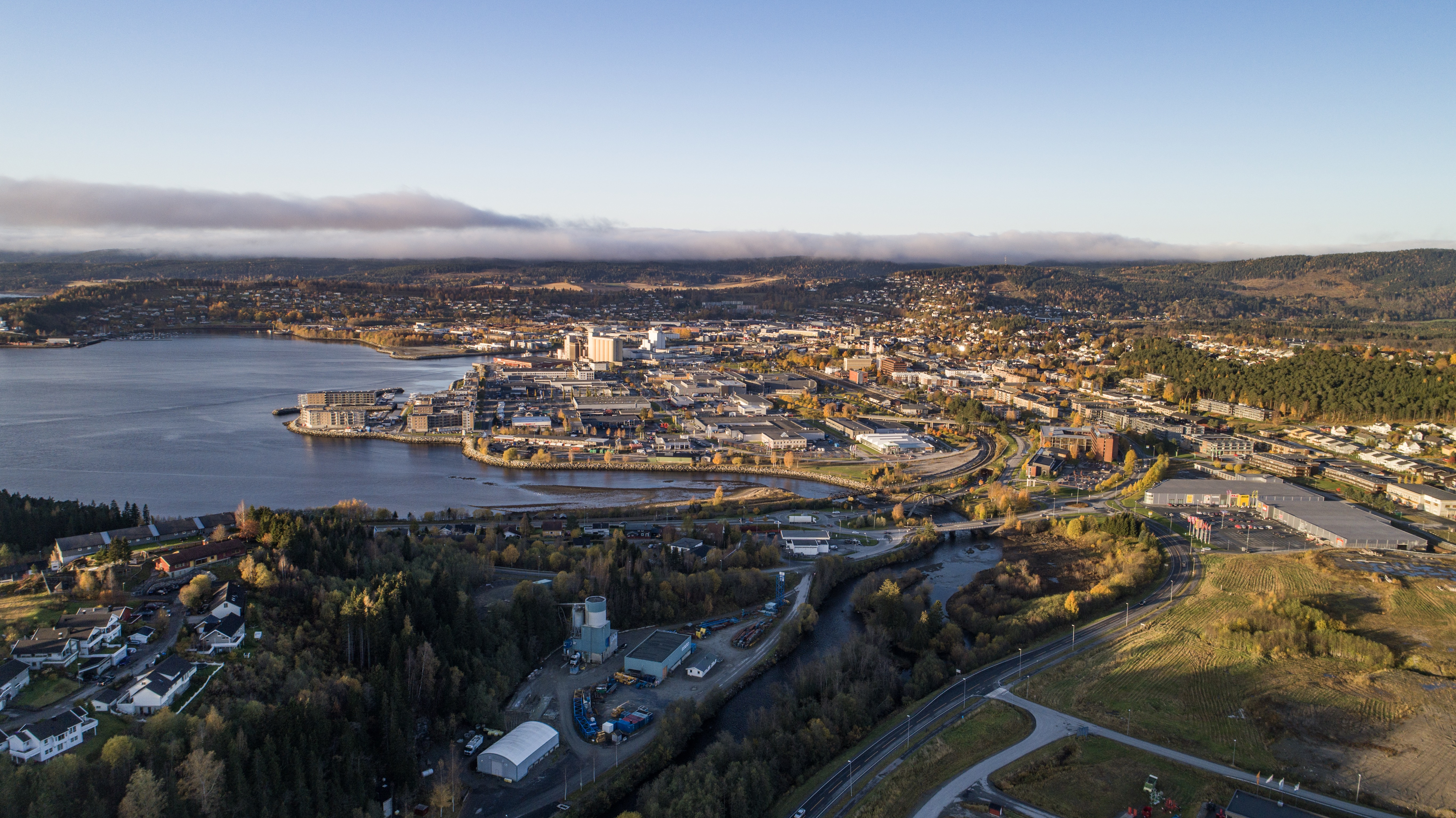
- View of the town seen from the southeast
- Interactive map of Steinkjer
- Location within Trøndelag Location within Norway
- Coordinates: 64.0148°N 11.4954°E
- Country: Norway
- Region: Central Norway
- County: Trøndelag
- District: Innherred
- Municipality: Steinkjer Municipality
- Established as
- Ladested: 1857

Area
  - Total: 8.15 km^{2} (3.15 sq mi)
- Elevation: 7 m (23 ft)

Population (2024)
  - Total: 13,060
  - Density: 1,602/km^{2} (4,150/sq mi)
- Demonym: Steinkjerbygg
- Time zone: UTC+01:00 (CET)
  - Summer (DST): UTC+02:00 (CEST)
- Post Code: 7713 Steinkjer

Steinkjer or Stïentje (Southern Sami) is the administrative centre of Steinkjer Municipality and Trøndelag county in Norway. The town is located at the northeastern end of the inner-most part of the Trondheimsfjorden, at the mouth of the river Steinkjerelva. In the eastern part of the town, the river of Figgja also flows into the fjord. The town is split in two by the river Steinkjerelva, creating the two traditional neighborhoods of Nordsia and Sørsia. Both the European route E6 highway and the Nordlandsbanen railway line run through the town, the latter serving the city at Steinkjer Station. Steinkjer Church and Egge Church are both located in the town.

Prior to 1 January 2018, the town was also the administrative centre of Nord-Trøndelag county, and since that day it has been the seat of the newly created Trøndelag county. This means the Trøndelag County Municipality is based here as is the County Governor, the representative of the King and Government of Norway in Trøndelag county.

The 8.15-square-kilometre (2,010-acre) town has a population (2025) of 13,060 and a population density of 1,602 inhabitants per square kilometre (4,150/sq mi).

== History ==
In Norway, the formannskapsdistrikt law went into effect on 1 January 1838 and it established civil municipalities throughout Norway. From that date, the village of Steinkjer was part of Stod Municipality. In 1857, the village was designated as a ladested (seaport/town), and due to the formannskapsdistrikt law, all towns with ladested status had to be self-governing municipalities. So, on 23 January 1858, the newly designated town was separated from Stod Municipality to form the new Steinkjer Municipality. It was a small municipality that included only the town itself. The initial population of Steinkjer Municipality was 1,150. Over time, the small town grew and annexed land from neighboring municipalities. In 1941, an area of Ogndal Municipality (population: 57) was transferred to the town of Steinkjer. In 1948, another area of Ogndal Municipality (population: 78) was transferred to the town of Steinkjer. Also in 1948, an area of Egge Municipality (population: 70) was transferred to the town of Steinkjer. In 1902, an unpopulated area of Ogndal Municipality was transferred into the town.

During World War II, the city suffered some bombings.

During the 1960s, there were many municipal mergers across Norway due to the work of the Schei Committee. On 1 January 1964, a large merger took place which merged the following places to form a new, larger Steinkjer Municipality:

- all of Beitstad Municipality (population: 2,563)
- all of Egge Municipality (population: 3,476)
- all of Kvam Municipality (population: 1,245)
- all of Ogndal Municipality (population: 2,678)
- all of Sparbu Municipality (population: 4,027)
- all of Stod Municipality (population: 1,268)
- the town of Steinkjer (population: 4,325)

== Name ==
The town (and municipality) is named after the old Steinkjer farm (Old Norse: Steinker) since the town was built on the site of the old farm. The first element is steinn (m) which means "stone" or "rock". The last element is ker (n) which means a "barrier made for catching fish" or "container".

== Transport ==
The Steinkjer Station is a train station that serves the town.

== Media gallery ==
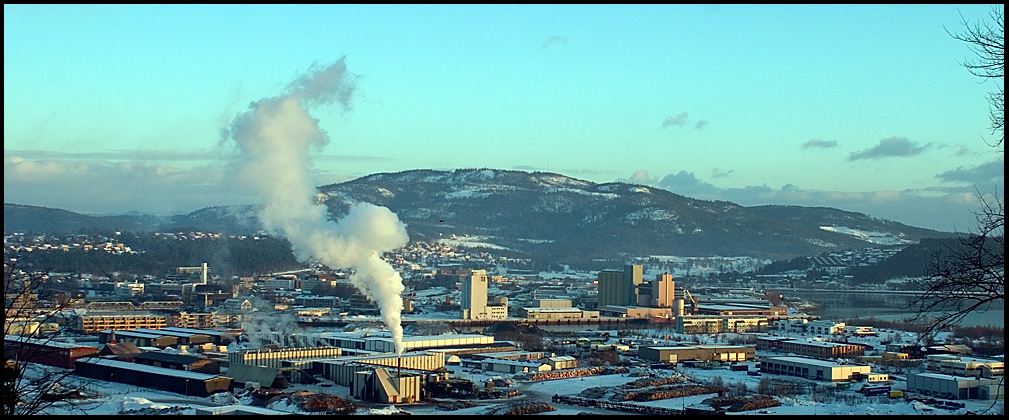
The town seen from the west

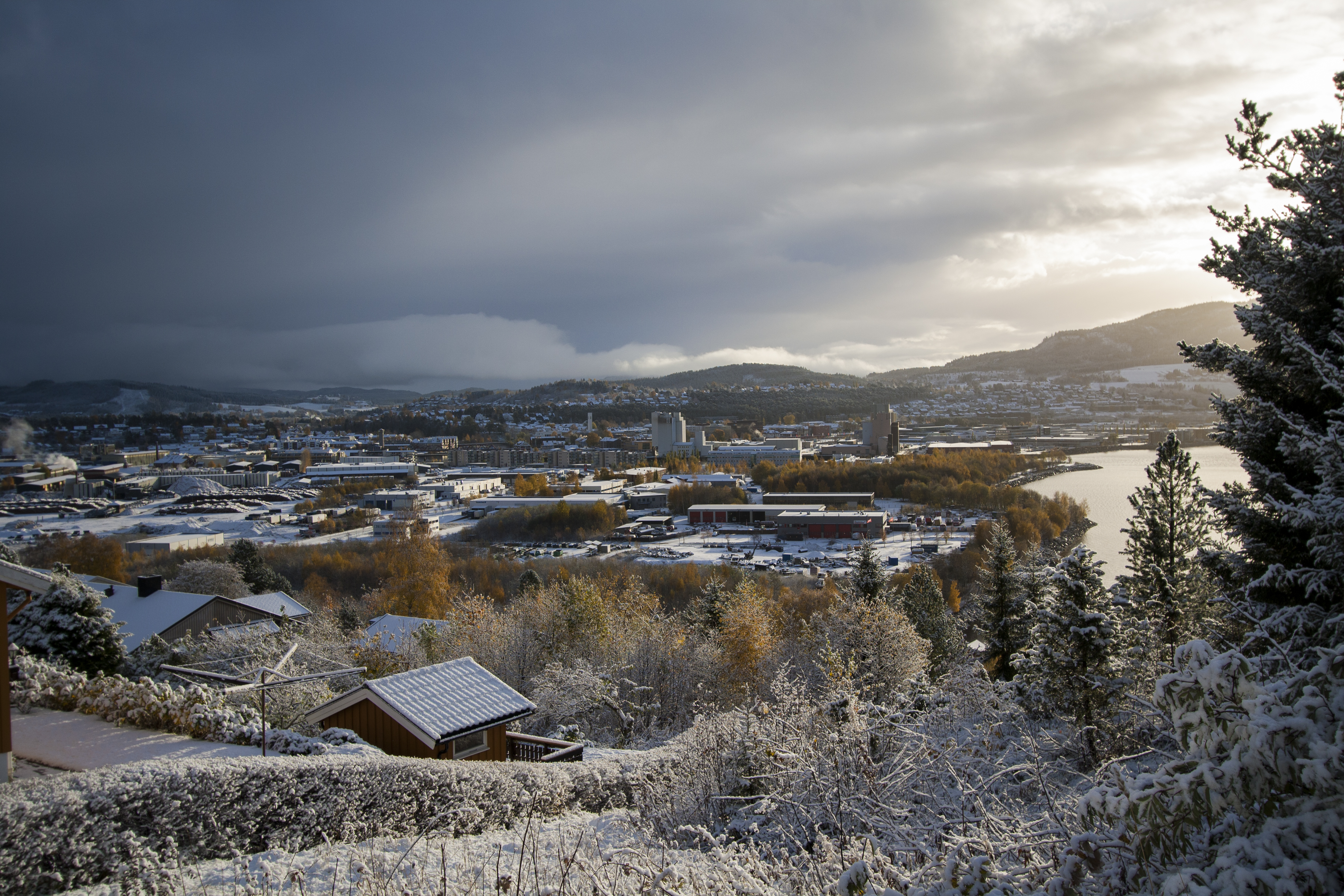
Another view of the town from Bogen

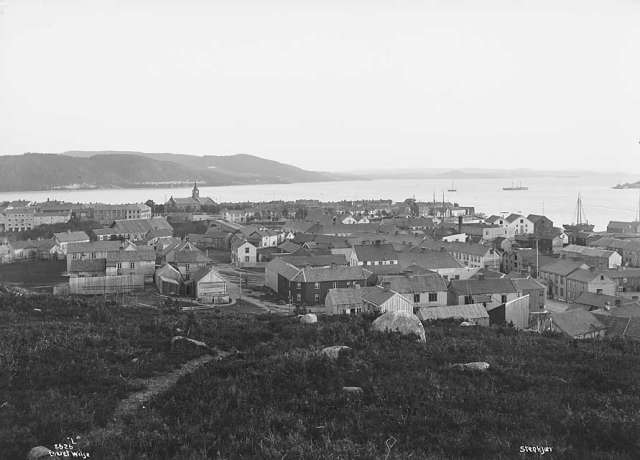
View of Steinkjer in 1880

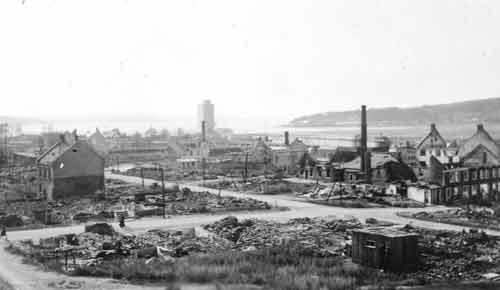
Steinkjer after the bombings of World War II

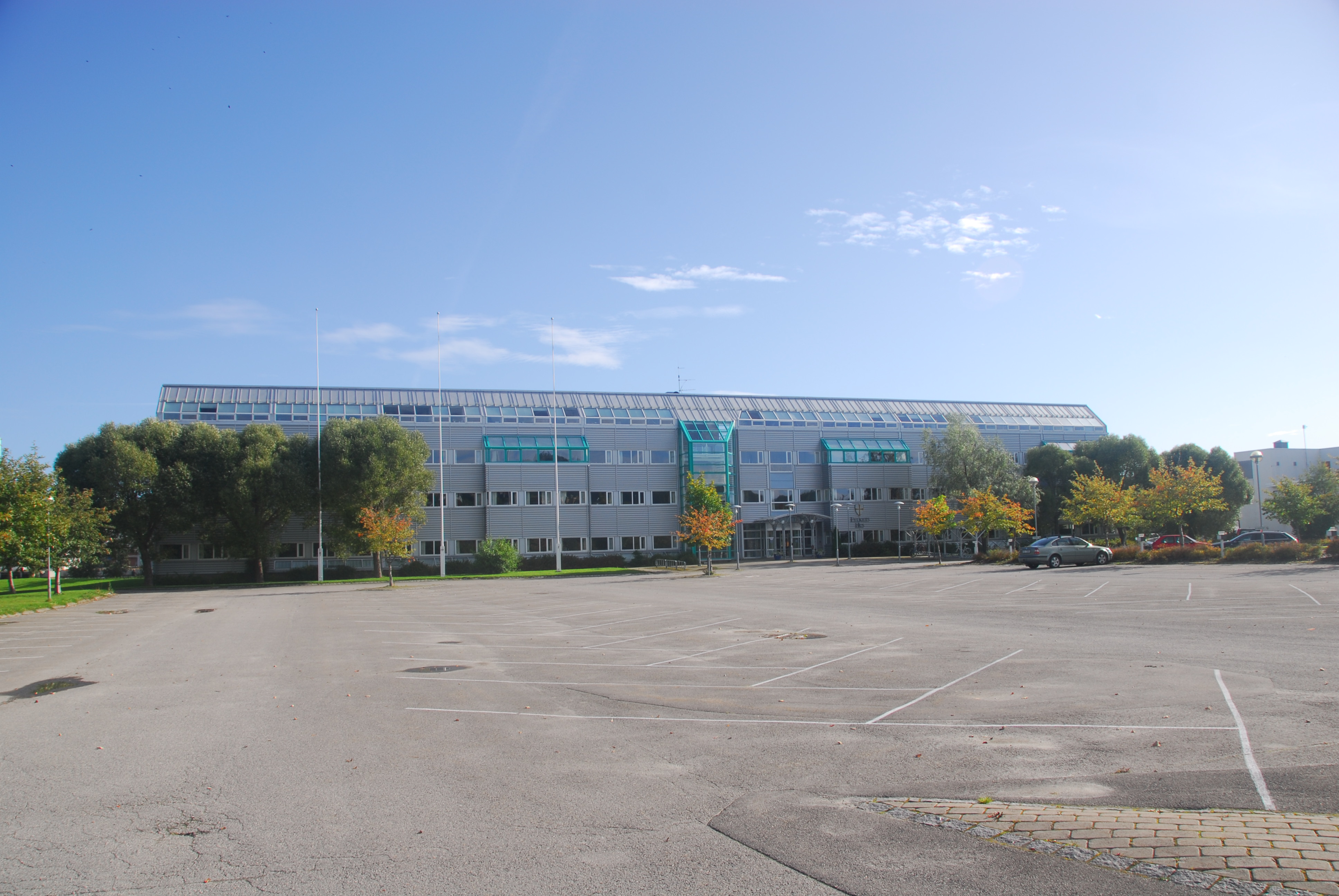
County administration building

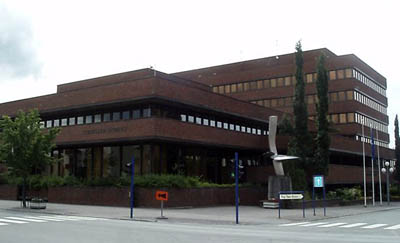
Steinkjer municipal building

== Climate ==
Climate data for Steinkjer 1991-2020 (6 m, Søndre Egge, extremes 1992-2025)
Month	Jan	Feb	Mar	Apr	May	Jun	Jul	Aug	Sep	Oct	Nov	Dec	Year
Record high °C (°F)	9.6 (49.3)	10.9 (51.6)	13.9 (57.0)	21.7 (71.1)	30.2 (86.4)	32.8 (91.0)	33.7 (92.7)	31 (88)	25.5 (77.9)	20.8 (69.4)	13.4 (56.1)	11.5 (52.7)	33.7 (92.7)
Mean daily maximum °C (°F)	0.6 (33.1)	1 (34)	4 (39)	9 (48)	14 (57)	17.6 (63.7)	20.7 (69.3)	19.7 (67.5)	14.9 (58.8)	8.6 (47.5)	3.4 (38.1)	1.3 (34.3)	9.6 (49.2)
Daily mean °C (°F)	−2.2 (28.0)	−2.3 (27.9)	0.1 (32.2)	4.3 (39.7)	8.8 (47.8)	12.5 (54.5)	15.2 (59.4)	14.5 (58.1)	10.5 (50.9)	5 (41)	1 (34)	−1.4 (29.5)	5.5 (41.9)
Mean daily minimum °C (°F)	−5.2 (22.6)	−5.3 (22.5)	−3.5 (25.7)	0.3 (32.5)	4.2 (39.6)	8.1 (46.6)	10.6 (51.1)	10.1 (50.2)	6.7 (44.1)	2.1 (35.8)	−2 (28)	−4.5 (23.9)	1.8 (35.2)
Record low °C (°F)	−25.4 (−13.7)	−24.2 (−11.6)	−20.6 (−5.1)	−11.3 (11.7)	−3.9 (25.0)	−1.7 (28.9)	2.6 (36.7)	0 (32)	−3.3 (26.1)	−9.2 (15.4)	−18.2 (−0.8)	−22.4 (−8.3)	−25.4 (−13.7)
Average precipitation mm (inches)	86 (3.4)	60 (2.4)	75 (3.0)	53 (2.1)	47 (1.9)	58 (2.3)	68 (2.7)	75 (3.0)	81 (3.2)	86 (3.4)	78 (3.1)	96 (3.8)	863 (34.3)
Source 1: Norwegian Meteorological Institute
Source 2: Noaa WMO averages 91-2020 Norway
