= Kvam Church =

Church in Trøndelag, Norway

- Kvam kirke
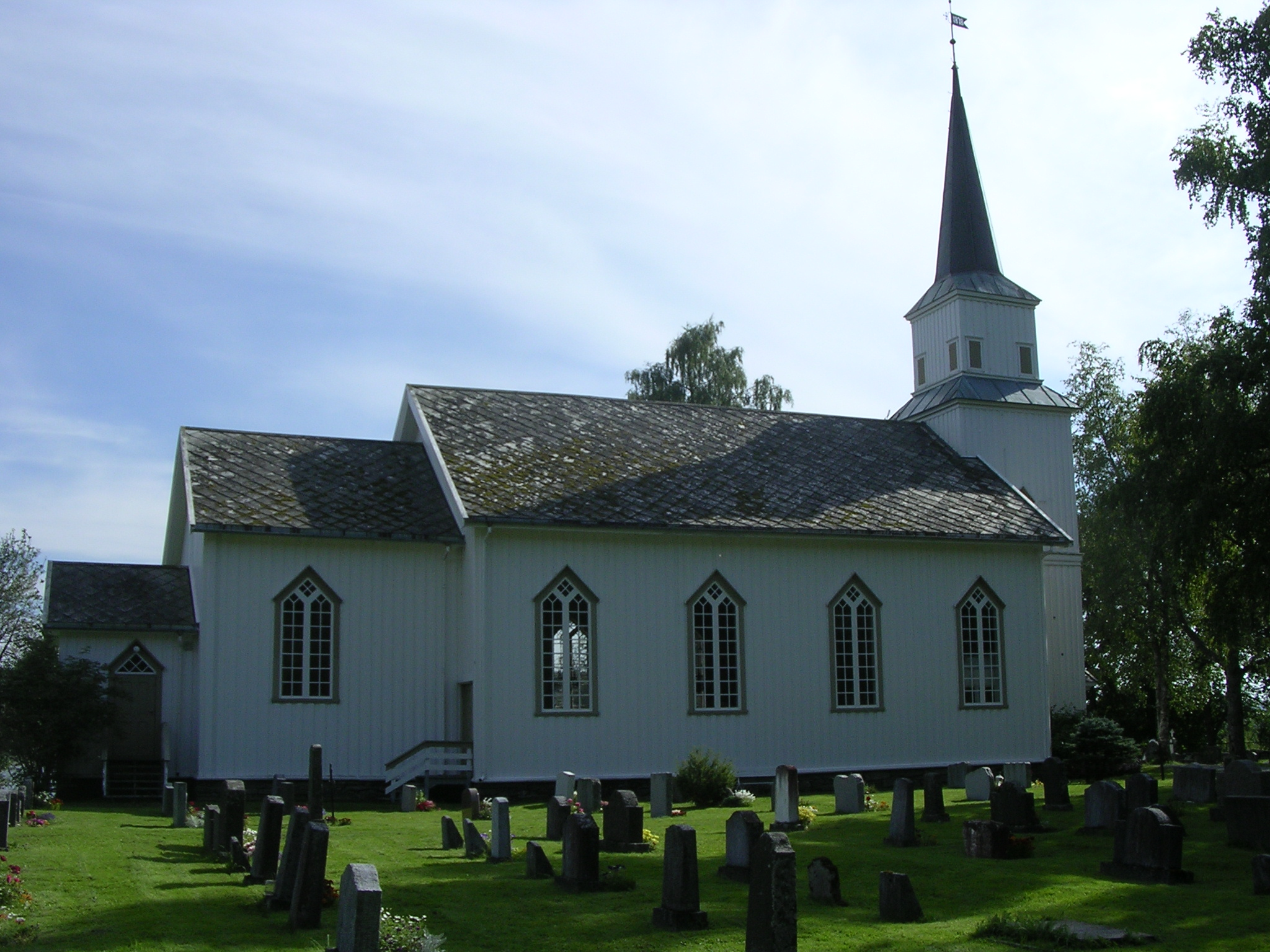
- View of the church
- Kvam Church
- 64.13901612°N 11.739795506°E
- Location: Steinkjer Municipality, Trøndelag
- Country: Norway
- Denomination: Church of Norway
- Churchmanship: Evangelical Lutheran

History
- Status: Parish church
- Founded: c. 1200
- Consecrated: 13 Nov 1878

Architecture
- Functional status: Active
- Architect: Rasmus Mentsen Overrein
- Architectural type: Long church
- Completed: 1878 (148 years ago)

Specifications
- Materials: Wood

Administration
- Diocese: Nidaros bispedømme
- Deanery: Stiklestad prosti
- Parish: Kvam
- Norwegian Cultural Heritage Site
- Type: Church
- Status: Not protected
- ID: 84855

Kvam Church (Norwegian: Kvam kirke) is a parish church of the Church of Norway in Steinkjer Municipality in Trøndelag county, Norway. It is located in the village of Kvam, along the lake Snåsavatnet. It is the church for the Kvam parish which is part of the Stiklestad prosti (deanery) in the Diocese of Nidaros. The white, wooden church was built in a long church style in 1878 using plans drawn up by the architect Rasmus M. Overrein.

== History ==
The earliest existing historical records of the church date back to the year 1533, but the church was not new that year. The first church at Kvam was likely a stave church that was built around the year 1200 on a site about 500 metres (1,600 ft) northwest of the present church site. There is a crucifix in the church that has been dated to the year 1200, leading archeologists to surmise that the church was founded around that time. Historically, the church name was spelled Qvam kirke.

An inspection of the very old church in 1664 noted that the building was about ready to collapse because the structure was rotting. Soon afterwards, the old church was torn down and a new log church was built on the same site in 1671. The new church was consecrated on 12 August 1671 by the Bishop Erik Bredal.

By the 1870s, the parish wanted a new church and there was a great dispute as to where to build it. The old church was on a hill, right next to a steep mountainside about 500 metres (1,600 ft) north of the shore of the large lake Snåsavatnet, but many wanted the new church to be built along the lake shore. After much debate, a royal resolution from 27 January 1877 ordered that the new church was to be built by the lake in 1878. The church was consecrated on 13 November 1878 by Bishop Andreas Grimelund. The old church was torn down after the new one was completed.

== See also ==
- List of churches in Nidaros
