= Stod Municipality =

Former municipality in Trøndelag, Norway

Stod Municipality Stod herred
- Former municipality
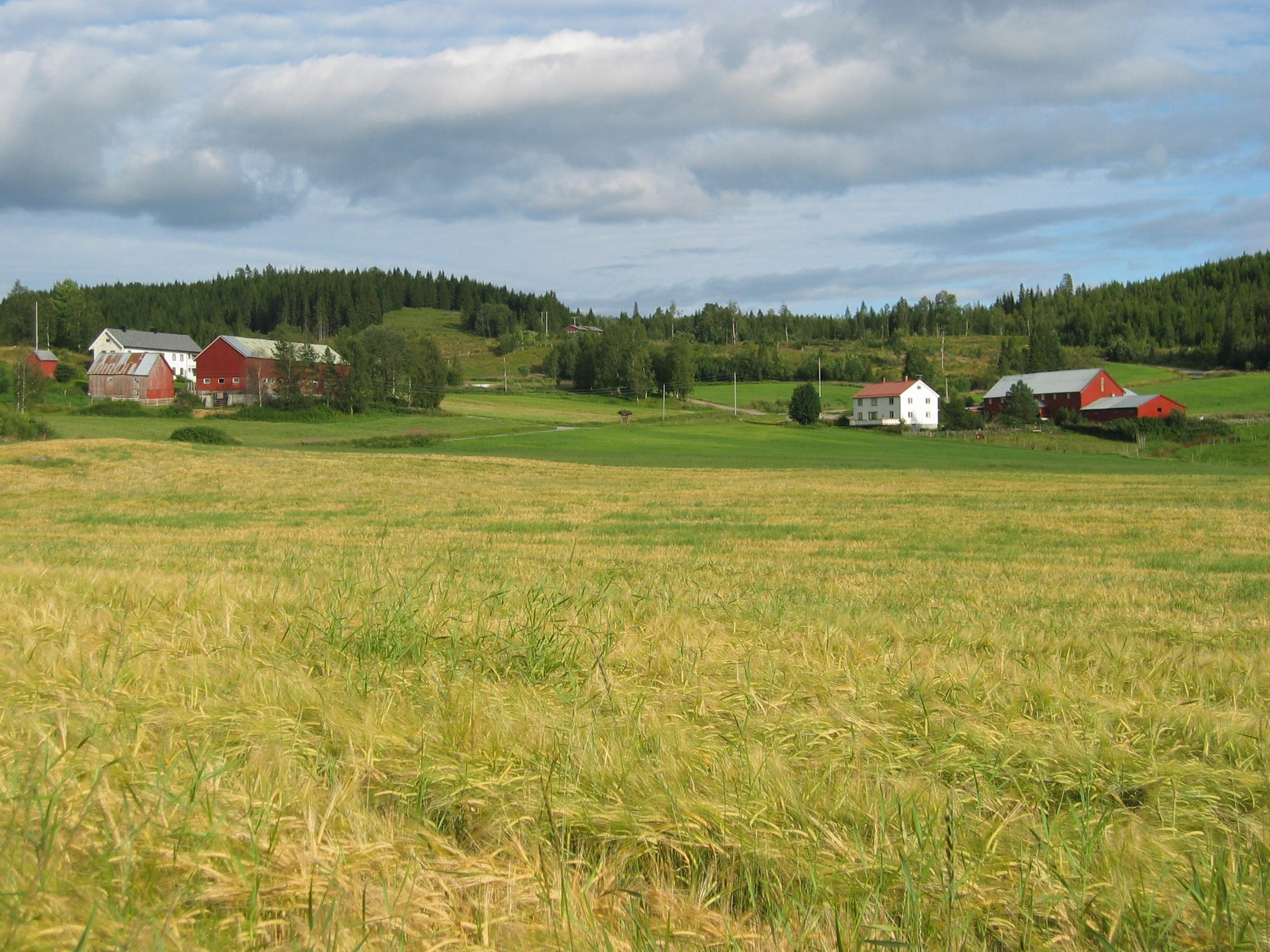
- View of the Finstad farm area in Stod

- Trøndelag within Norway

- Stod within Trøndelag
- Coordinates: 64°04′16″N 11°40′05″E
- Country: Norway
- County: Trøndelag
- District: Innherred
- Established: 1 Jan 1838
  - Created as: Formannskapsdistrikt
- Disestablished: 1 Jan 1964
  - Succeeded by: Steinkjer Municipality
- Administrative centre: Binde

Government
  - Mayor (1960–1963): Alf Hatling (Sp)

Area (upon dissolution)
  - Total: 256.7 km^{2} (99.1 sq mi)
  - Rank: #320 in Norway
- Highest elevation: 818.64 m (2,685.8 ft)

Population (1963)
  - Total: 1,293
  - Rank: #570 in Norway
  - Density: 5/km^{2} (13/sq mi)
  - Change (10 years): ▼ −10.1%
- Demonym: Stodbygg

Official language
  - Norwegian form: Neutral
- Time zone: UTC+01:00 (CET)
  - Summer (DST): UTC+02:00 (CEST)
- ISO 3166 code: NO-1734

Stod is a former municipality in the old Nord-Trøndelag county in Norway. The 257-square-kilometre (99 sq mi) municipality existed from 1838 until 1964. It originally encompassed the northern part of what is now Steinkjer Municipality, stretching from the town of Steinkjer to the northeast, along the lake Snåsavatnet, to the municipal border with Snåsa Municipality. Over time, however, the municipality was reduced in size to just a fraction of its original size, leaving just the area between the lake Snåsavatnet in the north to the Ogndalen valley in the south. The administrative centre of the municipality was the village of Binde. The main church for Stod was For Church, located just south of the administrative center. The local sports team is Stod IL.

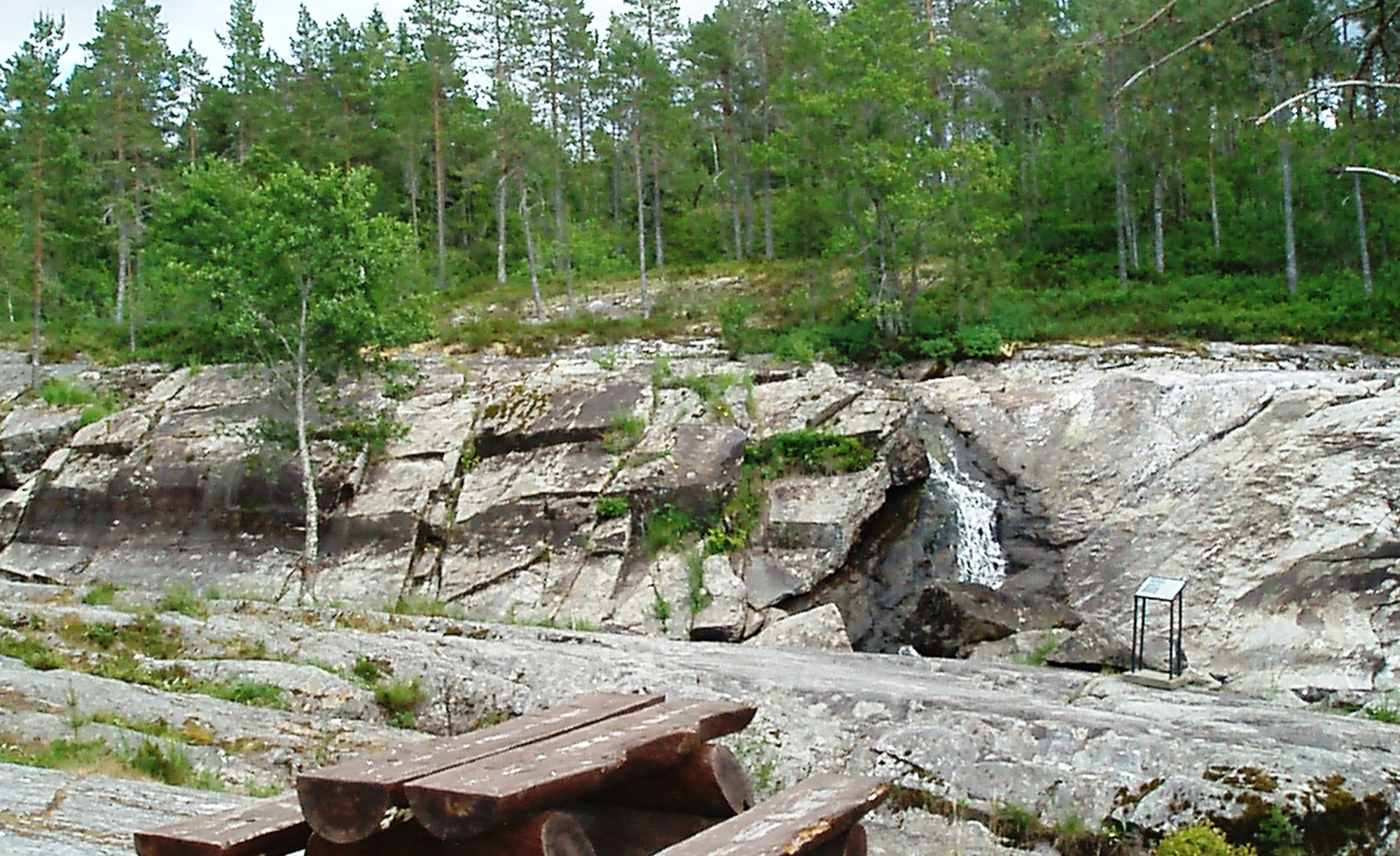
View of the Bølareinen rock carvings

Prior to its dissolution in 1963, the 257-square-kilometre (99 sq mi) municipality was the 320th largest by area out of the 689 municipalities in Norway. Stod Municipality was the 570th most populous municipality in Norway with a population of about 1,293. The municipality's population density was 5 inhabitants per square kilometre (13/sq mi) and its population had decreased by 10.1% over the previous 10-year period.

Stod is best known for rock carvings in the Bølareinen field that are approximately 6000 years old. The carvings are of animals and humans. There are several other prehistoric sites, including two stone circles, one on the Nordgård farm and one at the rectory, both of which are partially destroyed.

Traditionally, agriculture and forestry were the major industries in Stod, but construction of the Nordlandsbanen railway line brought with it new jobs and a dairy. More recently, most residents of the Stod area work in the town of Steinkjer.

== General information ==
The parish of Stod was established as a municipality on 1 January 1838 (see formannskapsdistrikt law). On 23 January 1858, the growing village of Steinkjer was established as a ladested (town) with a population of 1,150. The new town was separated from the municipality of Stod to constitute the new Steinkjer Municipality. This left Stod Municipality with 3,471 residents. On 1 January 1869, the western district of the municipality (population: 941) was separated from Stod to form the new Egge Municipality. This left Stod Municipality with 2,530 inhabitants. On 1 January 1909, the northern district of the municipality (population: 1,169) was separated to become the new Kvam Municipality. This left Stod Municipality with 934 inhabitants.

On 1 January 1964, a large municipal merger took place involving six rural municipalities and the town of Steinkjer. The following places were merged to form a new, larger Steinkjer Municipality:

- the town of Steinkjer (population: 4,325)
- Sparbu Municipality (population: 4,027)
- Egge Municipality (population: 3,476)
- Ogndal Municipality (population: 2,678)
- Beitstad Municipality (population: 2,563)
- Stod Municipality (population: 1,268)
- Kvam Municipality (population: 1,245)

=== Name ===
The municipality (originally the parish) is named after the local dialect expression stoe which means "ledge", "waterfall", or "depression". It is likely referring to rapids in the river between the lake Snåsavatnet, at an elevation of 22 metres (72 ft), and Fossemvatnet, at an elevation of 18 metres (59 ft) at Sunnan. It could also be referring to the ridge near the local church.

=== Churches ===
The Church of Norway had one parish (sokn) within Stod Municipality. At the time of the municipal dissolution, it was part of the Stod prestegjeld and the Nord-Innherad prosti (deanery) in the Diocese of Nidaros.

Churches in Stod Municipality
Parish (sokn)	Church name	Location of the church	Year built
Stod	For Church	Stod	1846

== Geography ==
Stod Municipality was located northeast of the town of Steinkjer. It was surrounded by Kvam Municipality to the north, Snåsa Municipality to the east, Ogndal Municipality to the south, and Egge Municipality to the west. The highest point in the municipality was the 818.64-metre (2,685.8 ft) tall mountain Brannheiklumpen, near the border with Snåsa Municipality.

== Government ==
While it existed, Stod Municipality was responsible for primary education (through 10th grade), outpatient health services, senior citizen services, welfare and other social services, zoning, economic development, and municipal roads and utilities. The municipality was governed by a municipal council of directly elected representatives. The mayor was indirectly elected by a vote of the municipal council. The municipality was under the jurisdiction of the Frostating Court of Appeal.

=== Municipal council ===
The municipal council (Herredsstyre) of Stod Municipality was made up of 13 representatives that were elected to four year terms. The tables below show the historical composition of the council by political party.

Stod herredsstyre 1959–1963
Party name (in Norwegian)	Number of representatives
Labour Party (Arbeiderpartiet)	5
Centre Party (Senterpartiet)	6
Liberal Party (Venstre)	2
Total number of members:	13

Stod herredsstyre 1955–1959
Party name (in Norwegian)	Number of representatives
Labour Party (Arbeiderpartiet)	5
Farmers' Party (Bondepartiet)	5
Liberal Party (Venstre)	3
Total number of members:	13

Stod herredsstyre 1951–1955
Party name (in Norwegian)	Number of representatives
Labour Party (Arbeiderpartiet)	5
Farmers' Party (Bondepartiet)	4
Liberal Party (Venstre)	3
Total number of members:	12

Stod herredsstyre 1947–1951
Party name (in Norwegian)	Number of representatives
Labour Party (Arbeiderpartiet)	5
Farmers' Party (Bondepartiet)	4
Liberal Party (Venstre)	3
Total number of members:	12

Stod herredsstyre 1945–1947
Party name (in Norwegian)	Number of representatives
Labour Party (Arbeiderpartiet)	5
Joint List(s) of Non-Socialist Parties (Borgerlige Felleslister)	7
Total number of members:	12

Stod herredsstyre 1937–1941*
Party name (in Norwegian)	Number of representatives
Labour Party (Arbeiderpartiet)	5
Joint List(s) of Non-Socialist Parties (Borgerlige Felleslister)	7
Total number of members:	12
Note: Due to the German occupation of Norway during World War II, no elections were held for new municipal councils until after the war ended in 1945.

=== Mayors ===
The mayor (Norwegian: ordfører) of Stod Municipality was the political leader of the municipality and the chairperson of the municipal council. Here is a list of people who held this position:

- 1838–1843: Peder Rasmus Lyng
- 1844–1845: Thomas Balchen
- 1846–1847: Martin Hannestad
- 1848–1851: Jonas Haugum
- 1852–1855: Ole O. Rygg
- 1856–1859: Peter Taraldsen
- 1860–1861: Ole Lægran
- 1862–1867: Jakob Haugum
- 1868–1869: Ole Anton Qvam
- 1870–1877: Adolf Bødtker
- 1878–1881: Christian Elden
- 1882–1883: Henrik Østgaard
- 1884–1889: Peter Følling (V)
- 1890–1891: Erik A. Næstvold
- 1892–1895: Ole Kristian Forfang (V)
- 1896–1907: Peter Følling (V)
- 1908–1910: Arne Vollan (RF)
- 1911–1919: Andreas Lillevestre (V)
- 1920–1922: John Tiltnes (Bp)
- 1923–1925: Albert Fredrik Eggen (V)
- 1926–1928: Sverre Andreassen Lillevestre (Bp)
- 1929–1931: Olaf Hatling (Bp)
- 1932–1934: Sverre Andreassen Lillevestre (Bp)
- 1935–1937: Kaspar Flekstad (LL)
- 1938–1940: Albert Fredrik Eggen (V)
- 1941–1942: Georg Høin (NS)
- 1943–1945: Nikolai Valøen (Bp)
- 1946–1947: Sverre Binde (Bp)
- 1948–1951: Olav Molberg (V)
- 1952–1955: Einar Ystgård (Bp)
- 1956–1959: Olav Molberg (V)
- 1960–1963: Alf Hatling (Sp)

== See also ==
- List of former municipalities of Norway
