= Bangsjøan =

Lake in Trøndelag, Norway

- Interactive map of the lake
- Location: Trøndelag
- Coordinates: 64.3127°N 12.0159°E
- Primary outflows: Bongna
- Basin countries: Norway
- Max. length: 16 kilometres (9.9 mi)
- Max. width: 3 kilometres (1.9 mi)
- Surface area: 21 km^{2} (8.1 sq mi)
- Shore length^{1}: 65.78 kilometres (40.87 mi)
- Surface elevation: 315 metres (1,033 ft)
- References: NVE
- ^{1} Shore length is not a well-defined measure.

Bangsjøan is a man-made lake in Trøndelag county, Norway. It is located along the borders of the municipalities of Snåsa, Grong, Overhalla, and Steinkjer. The lake lies about 10 kilometres (6.2 mi) north of the lake Snåsavatnet and about 18 kilometres (11 mi) northwest of the village of Snåsa. The lake was created by the building of a dam which cause the water level of three neighboring lakes to rise and flow together into one large lake. The dam is located on what is now the northwestern side of the lake.

Originally, there were three lakes. The southwestern lake was called Ytter-Bangsjøen, the middle lake was Midter-Bangsjøen, and the northeastern lake was Øyster-Bangsjøen. Today, the lakes flow together and the three old lake names are still used to refer to their respective areas in the large lake. The lake empties through a dam at the northwestern end and into the river Bongna.

== See also ==
- List of lakes in Norway
