= MS St. Olaf =

Ship built in 1904

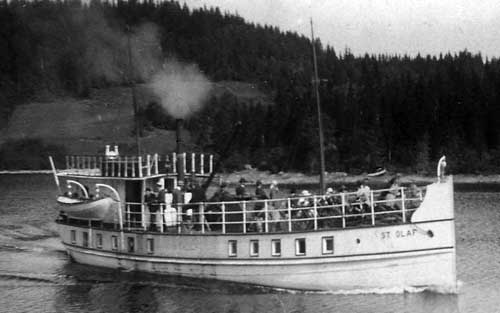

History
- Name: MS St. Olaf
- Namesake: Olaf Haraldsson
- Owner: Stod Motorbaatsamlag (1904–17); Emil Lorch Falch (1917–)
- Port of registry: Steinkjer
- Route: Snåsavatnet
- Builder: Sunnan Treforedringsindustrier
- Completed: 1904
- Maiden voyage: 24 June 1904
- Out of service: 1921
- Fate: Beached and abandoned at Sunnan in 1921

General characteristics
- Type: Merchant ship
- Tonnage: 10.58 GRT / 6.20 NRT
- Length: 21.7 m (71.3 ft)
- Beam: 3.6 m (11.8 ft)
- Draught: 2.1 m (6.9 ft)
- Installed power: 18 kw (24 hp)
- Propulsion: Bolinder gas engine
- Capacity: 51 passengers

MF St. Olaf was a passenger and cargo merchant ship which operated on the lake of Snåsavatnet in Trøndelag, Norway. She was built at and had her base at Sunnan in what is now Steinkjer Municipality, and operated along the lake to Viosen in Snåsa Municipality.

The vessel was built in 1904 and operated until 1921, at competing with and later in a cooperation with SS Bonden. Traffic increased with the opening of the Hell–Sunnan Line to Sunnan Station in 1905. St. Olaf was beached and abandoned in 1921.

== Specifications ==
St. Olaf was a motor ferry with a wooden hull and a crew of three. As built, she had a length of 15.2 meters (50 ft), a beam of 3.1 meters (10.1 ft) and a draght of 1.2 meters (3.9 ft). This gave her her a register tonnage of 20 gross. She had a Gulowsen gas engine with a power output of 9 kW (12 hp), and certified for 30 passengers.

After the 1908 extension, she was extended to a length of 21.7 meters (71.3 ft), a beam of 3.6 meters (11.8 ft) and a draught of 2.1 meters (6.9 ft). This increased her to 40 gross register tonnes and a capacity for 45 passengers. She received a 18 kW (24 hp) engine from Bolinder. The passenger capacity had then increased to 90.

== History ==
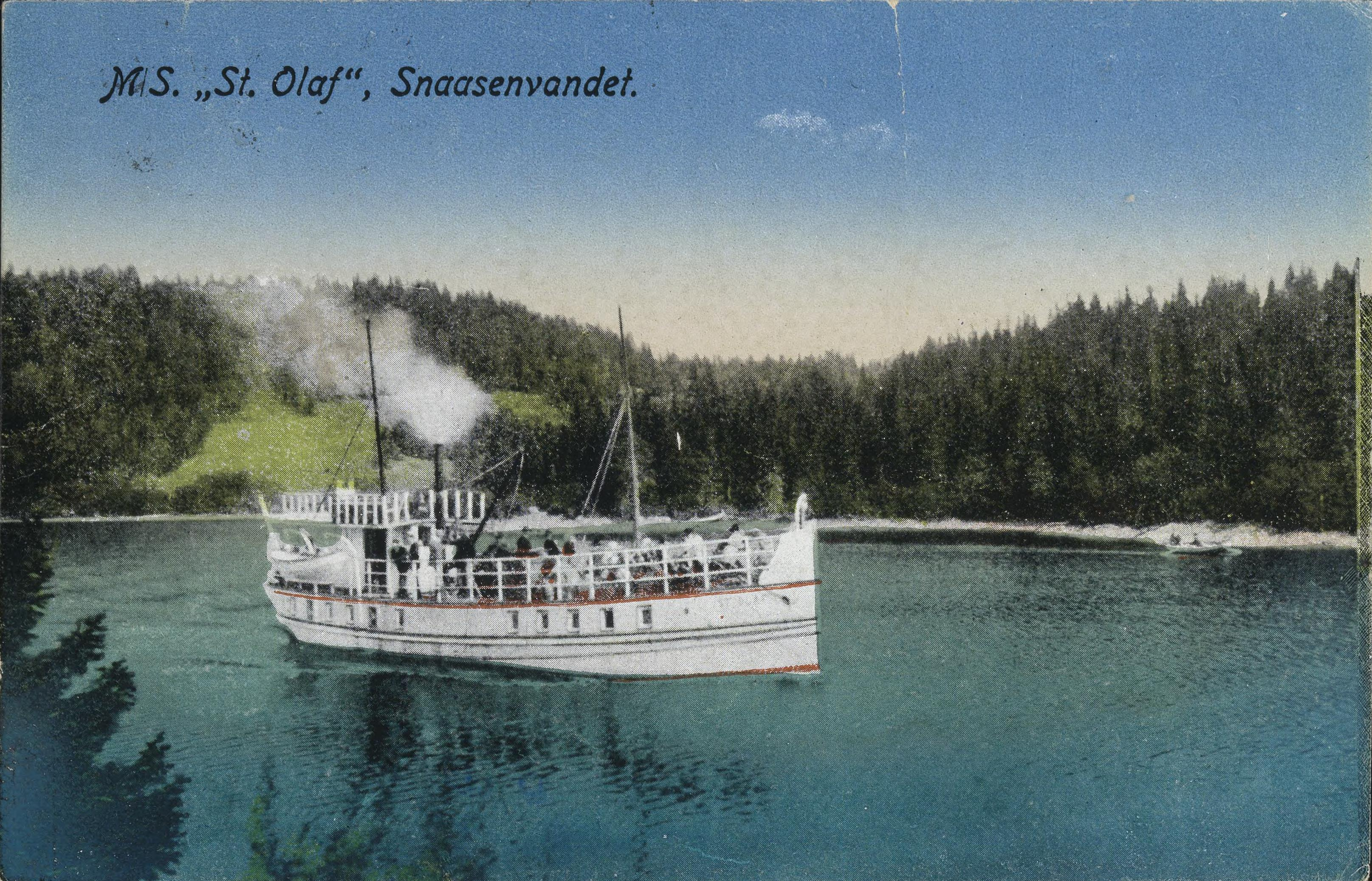
MS St. Olaf on Snåsavatnet

St. Olaf was the third ship to provide scheduled operations on Snåsavatnet. SS Bonden had been operating a route since 1885, when it had replaced SS Diana. The main challenge for Bonden was Klingsundet, a very shallow sound in Snåsavatnet. The situation was particularly precarious in 1901, which was a very try summer. Despite dredging, at low water levels, the sound was simply too shallow for Bonden.

Led by teacher Peter Følling in Kvam, a group of investors therefor thought that they by using a smaller and thus shallower ship, could operate also during periods of low water. The shipping company Stod Motorbaatsamlag was incorporated on 12 March 1904. It contracted Sunnan Treforedringsindustrier to build St. Olaf on site at Sunnan. They opted for a gas engine, and St. Olaf would have been one of the very first scheduled ships in Norway to be a motor ship rather than be a steamship.

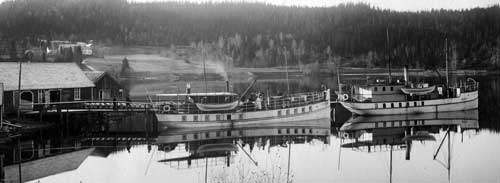
MS St. Olaf and SS Bonden docked at Sunnan in 1914

The vessel was launched on 24 June 1904, and put into service. Based at Sunnan, she operated a scheduled service along the lake to Viosen, for seven months during the summer. The rest of the year there was too much ice. Initially the two shipping companies competed, but from 1906 they entered into a cooperation, revenue sharing and tickets valid on both ships. Between them they operated the route each day, and added several new stops. In 1906 the stops on the route were Sunnan, Langhammer, Flekstad, Klinga, Tiltnes, Ryg, Valøy, Vekseth, Oldernæs, Viosen and Sem. Later Klinga and Tiltnes were terminated as stops.

The Hell–Sunnan Line was opened to Sunnan Station on 15 November 1905. This led to a substantial increase in traffic on the lake, as it had become a natural extension of the railway. It also made Snåsa much more accessible to tourists, and in particular became popular with moose hunting for Germans. A new quay was built at Sunnan Station, allowing the trains to pull up next the ships for transshipment.

St. Olaf underwent its first extension already in 1906, increasing the passenger title to 45. Already at this point she became comparable in depth to Bonden, counteracting the whole argument for her inception. She was further extended in 1908.

Emil Lorch Falch bought St. Olaf in 1917. A new agreement about joint sailing was made with Bonden, and St. Olaf continued in operation until 1921, when she was taken out of service. Bonden continued on the route until 1926, when the railway opened to Snåsa Station, and all scheduled services on Snåsavatnet were terminated.

The vessel ended her days beached at Sunnan, in the bay near the railway bridge, abandoned. She was left to decay for many years.
