= SS Bonden =

Steamship built in 1885

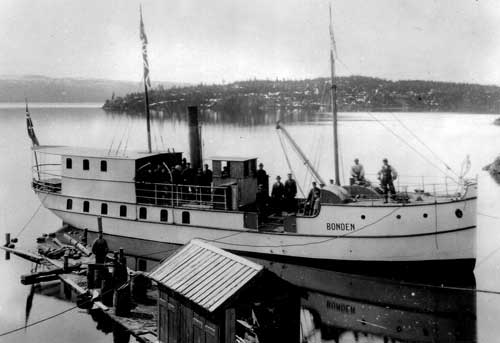
- SS Bonden at Hammer

History
- Name: SS Bonden
- Owner: Stod Motorbaatsamlag
- Port of registry: Steinkjer
- Route: Snåsavatnet
- Builder: Trondhjems mekaniske Værksted
- Yard number: 45
- Laid down: February 1885
- Completed: June 1885
- In service: July 1885
- Out of service: 30 October 1926
- Fate: Scrapped in 1930 in Snåsa

General characteristics
- Type: Merchant ship
- Tonnage: 63 GRT
- Length: 21.5 m (70.7 ft)
- Beam: 4.0 m (13.2 ft)
- Draught: 1.7 m (5.8 ft)
- Installed power: 51 kw (70 hp)
- Propulsion: Bolinder gas engine
- Capacity: 51 passengers

SS Bonden was a passenger and cargo steamship which operated on the lake of Snåsavatnet in Trøndelag, Norway. She operated out of Sunnan in what is now Steinkjer Municipality, and operated along the lake to Viosen in Snåsa Municipality. The ship was owned by Snaasens Dampskibssamlag, which entire business was operating the vessel.

She was built at Trondhjems mekaniske Værksted and entered service in 1885, replacing SS Diana. From 1904 to 1921 she had a competitor in MS St. Olaf. The Hell–Sunnan Line was completed in 1905, and Bonden became a natural extension of the railway. This lasted until the Nordland Line was extended along the lake in 1926, and Bonden was taken out of service. She was scrapped in 1930.

== Specifications ==
MS Bonden was a steel-hulled steamship. She had lounges in two classes, a cargo area and an area for livestock. She had a crew of five—a skipper, engineer, fireman, able seaman and a restauteur.

After 1905, she had a length of 21.5 meters (70.7 ft), a beam of 4.0 meters (13.2 ft) and a draught of 1.7 meters (5.8 ft). This gave her her a register tonnage of 63 gross. She was certified to carry 134 passengers in addition to 15 tonnes of cargo. Her compound steam engine had a power output of 51 kW (70 hp).

== History ==
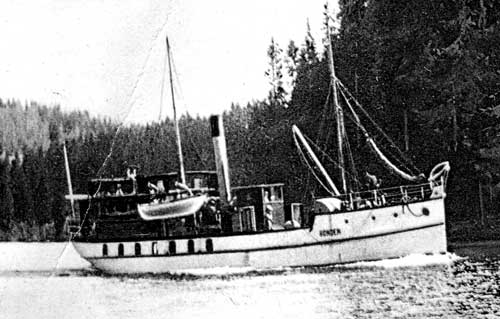
SS Bonden on Snåsavatnet

Bonden was the second ship to provide scheduled operations on Snåsavatnet. SS Diana had operated a scheduled service on the lake since 1871. By the 1880s, she was becoming too small, and there was a lot of discontent with her amongst the traveling public. Both service, prices and comfort were criticized.

Diana was owned by investors from Steinkjer. Back before she was ordered, there had been attempts at creating a local steamship company, but there was no interest. Ole Olsen Five had just moved to Snåsa. He proceeded with founding a cooperative store and a savings bank, and encouraged the people around the lake to establish their own shipping company. Shares were sold from 1884, and Snaasens Dampskibssamlag could be established late in the year. Five served as the company's first chairman.

The company placed an order at Trondhjems mekaniske Værksted in February 1885, and the ship was delivered in June. She entered service in July. She was both larger and faster than Diana, who stopped her services on Snåsavatnet at the end of the 1885 season. The third captain of the ship was Paul Pedersen, who was hired in 1892 and remained in that position until 1923.

Bonden was based at Sunnan, and operated a route up the lake to Viosen. She had various stpping patterns through her life. For instance, in 1918 she stopped at Flekkstad, Tiltnes, Valøen, Rygg, Hammer, Oldernæs and Vekseth. Previously she had also called at Langhammer, Klinga, Ålneset and Vegset. The route took four and a half hours each way, later reduced to four hours. She would typically do one round trip per day, five days a week before 1 September, three times a week afterwards.

Because the parts north of Klingsundet would thaw earlier than the lower part, operations on the upper part of the lake could often start a week earlier, and last up to three weeks later than on the lower sections. In these periods the ship would sail from Tiltnes instead of Sunnan, typically from early or mid May to December.

The ship was extended in 1895 and again in 1905. Between 1887 and 1893 the operations received government subsidies, afterwards it had to operate on a commercial basis. For the most part the company was profitable, especially around 1918.

The largest operating challenge was thorugh Klingsundet, a very shallow sound in Snåsavatnet. The situation was particularly precarious in 1901, which was a very dry summer. Despite dredging, at low water levels, the sound was simply too shallow for Bonden.

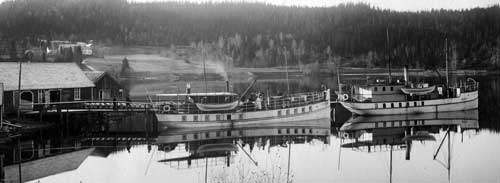
MS St. Olaf and SS Bonden at Sunnan in 1914

A group of people locals saw this as a possibility, and founded a competing shipping company. MS St. Olaf was delivered in 1904. She was built particularly shallow, which should allow her to cross Klingsundet no matter how low the water level became. From 1906 the two companies entered into a formal revenue sharing agreement. Tickets became valid on both ships, and they coordinated so only one of the vessels would operate the route on a given day.

The Hell–Sunnan Line opened to Sunnan Station on 15 November 1905. This led to a substantial increase in traffic on the lake, as it had become a natural extension of the railway. It also made Snåsa much more accessible to tourists, and in particular became popular with moose hunting for Germans. A new quay was built at Sunnan Station, allowing the trains to pull up next the ships for transshipment.

St. Olaf stopped its operations in 1921, and for the last five years, Bonden was alone on the route. The Nordland Line was extended from Sunnan to Snåsa Station on 30 October 1926. The same day, Bonden ran her last service on the lake. She was eventually sold for 320 kroner as scrap, and scrapped in 1930 in Snåsa.

In the early 1990s, a group of enthusiasts bought MS Bonden II and put her into a scheduled service on Snåsavatnet for sightseeing. She ran on the route from 1992 to 2002.
