= MS Lofotfjord II =

Ship built in 1974

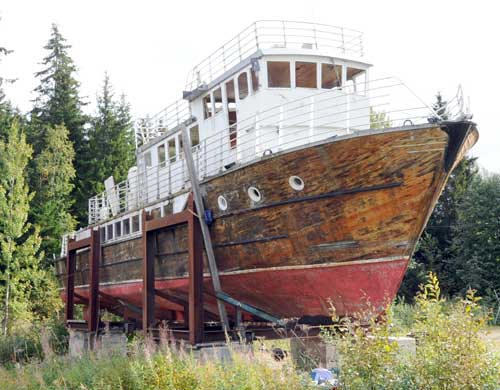
- MS Bonden II at Sunnan on 12 September 2010, three days before she was demolished

History
- Name: MS Lofotfjord (1974–92); MS Bonden II (1992–2010)
- Owner: Lofoten Trafikklag (1974–92); Bonden II AS (1992–2010)
- Operator: Lofoten Trafikklag (1974–92); Bonden II AS (1992–2002)
- Port of registry: Svolvær (1974–92); Steinkjer (1992–2010)
- Builder: Brødrene Aa
- Yard number: 131
- Completed: May 1974
- Out of service: 2001
- Identification: Call sign: JWQC
- Fate: Demolished 15–16 September 2010

General characteristics
- Type: Ferry
- Tonnage: 71 GRT / 38 NRT
- Length: 21.0 m (68.9 ft)
- Beam: 4.7 m (15 ft)
- Draught: 2.2 m (7 ft 3 in)
- Installed power: 750 kW (1020 hp)
- Propulsion: 2x General Motors GM 12V-71 diesel engines
- Speed: 18 kn (33 km/h; 21 mph)
- Capacity: 60 passengers

MS Lofotfjord II, later MS Bonden II, was a passenger ferry. Built at Brødrene Aa, she was delivered to Lofoten Trafikklag in May 1974. Based in Svolvær, they used her for scheduled services within Vågan Municipality and Lødingen Municipality. She was the first fast ferry to operate in Nordland.

The ferry was sold to Bonden II A/S in 1992, who renamed her MS Bonden II. She was moved to the lake Snåsavatnet and operated scheduled and charter sightseeing tours out of Sunnan until 2001. She was demolished in 2010.

== Specifications ==
The vessel was a wood-hull passenger ferry with a capacity for 60 passengers. She was 21.0 meters (68.9 ft) long, had a beam of 4.7 meters (15 ft) and a draght of 2.2 meters (7 ft 3 in). This gave her her a register tonnage of 71 gross and 38 net.

She was equipped with two General Motors GM 12V-71 four-stroke, V12 diesel engines, with a combined power output of 750 kW (1020 hp). She was certified with a speed of 18 knots (33 km/h; 21 mph).

== History ==
=== Lofotfjord II ===
A scheduled passenger ferry service was operated from 1951 by Martin Mikaelsen between Svolvær and Lødingen Vestbygd. When the road vehicle ferry Svolvær–Skutvik opened in 1963, the route was taken over by Saltens Dampskibsselskab and turned into a regional route. The services was transferred to Lofoten Trafikklag in 1974. They had applied to operate with a much faster ship, able to operate at 20 knots (37 km/h; 23 mph) instead of 10 knots (19 km/h; 12 mph), between Svolvær and Øksneshamn. This became the first fast ferry service in Nordland.

MS Lofotfjord II was built at Brødrene Aa and delivered in May 1974 to Lofoten Trafikklag. She ran on the route between Solvær–Brettesnes–Digermulen–Ulvåg–Lødingen-Vestbygd.

=== Bonden II ===
Between 1871 and 1926 there had been regular scheduled ship services on Snåsavatnet, most prominently by SS Bonden (1885–1926). The extension of the Nordland Line from Sunnan Station to Snåsa Station in 1926 made scheduled ships redundant. Bonden II was the seventh commercial ship on the lake, and the only one to operate since 1971.

Enthusiasts were keen to re-establish a ferry service on the lake, but with both a railway line and roads on both sides of the lake, there was little need for it as a means of transport. There was a group of people who started looking into the case, the most prominent being Sigurd Vikan. He applied Steinkjer Municipality and Snåsa Municipality on 18 August 1991 for a conession to operate a scheduled service along the lake. The application received some press coverage, and resulted in several other enthusiast joining up, in particular Fredrik Brandt jr. The two underwent a survey, and concluded that operations were realistic. The operating company Bonden II A/S was incorporated on 13 February 1992, with shares being sold to the public.

The pair had their eyes on Lofotfjord II, and traveled on 9 April 1992 to Lofoten to inspect and purchase the ship. She sailed to Bodø the same day, and reached Steinkjer on 11 April. The main challenge was to bring her the short section from the Trondheimsfjord to Snåsavatnet. This was done on 9 May. She was freighted by car, and four cranes were needed to take her on and off the transport vehicle. Her named was changed to Bonden II. She becan revenue services on 30 May 1992.

Bonden II had her base at Sunnan. She was used on scheduled and chatered sightseeing tours, traveling in summer-only on a route from Sunnan to Bøla, Viosen and Vegset. She freighten 5000 passengers in 1992, and 6600 in 1993. For the first season, she was designed as floating post office between 20 July and 30 September, carrying her own postal stamp. The last scheduled services ran in 2001, after having transported 34,000 people while on Snåsavatnet. From 2002 she was docket at Sunnan. There were some plans of taking her back down to Steinkjer and using her as a restaurant ship, but nothing came of the plans. She was beached on 18 December 2008, and during this process there was made a large whole in her stern. She was demolished on site at Sunnan on 15 and 16 September 2010.

== Bibliography ==
- Sandnes, Jørn (1994). Snåsavatnet: natur, kultur, historie (in Norwegian). Trondheim: Snåsavatnets grunneierlag. ISBN 8299325609.
- Svanberg, Erling (1990). Langs vei og lei i Nordland: samferdsel i Nordland gjennom 3000 år (in Norwegian). Bodø: Nordland County Municipality. ISBN 8274160215.
