= SS Diana =

Steamship

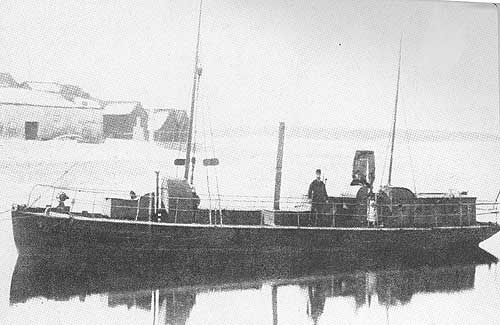

History
- Name: SS Diana
- Port of registry: Trondheim (1869–1870); Steinkjer (1870–)
- Builder: Charlottenlund Verft
- Completed: 1869
- Fate: Demolished

General characteristics
- Type: Merchant ship
- Tonnage: 14 GRT
- Length: 16.2 m (53 ft)
- Beam: 2 m (6 ft 7 in)
- Propulsion: Trolla Brug steam engine

SS Diana was a combined passenger and cargo steamship. Built at Charlottenlund Verft in 1869, she originally was based in Trondheim, Norway, where she did spordic tours on the Trondheimsfjord. She was relocated to the lake of Snåsavatnet in 1871, where she served as a scheduled steamer until 1885. She ended her careed as a tugboat on Beitstadfjorden.

== Specifications ==
The vessel was a wood-hull combined freight and passenger ship. She was 14 meters (46 ft) long with a beam of 2 meters (6 ft 7 in). After she was lengthened in 1876, she was 16.2 meters (53 ft) long and had register tonnage of 14 gross. She was equipped with a steam engine built at Trolla Brug.

== History ==
=== Trondheim ===
Diana was built by Charlottenlund Verft in 1869 for Halvor Iversen of Trondheim. Her main use was to operate recreational trips, such as sports fishing and sightseeing. She was also occasionally put into short-distance services, such as to Rotvold. Her small size and designed turned out to make her unsuitable for operations on the fjord.

=== Snåsavatnet ===
Snåsavatnet had since time immemorial been used as the main transport artery for the areas surrounding it. During summer this was by rowboat, and by winter across the ice. The first attempt as a commercial ship enterprise on the lake was Farmand, which was put into service during the 1850s, but was only in use for a short time. The lake is narrow, but 42 kilometers (26 mi) long, and at 118 square kilometers (46 sq mi) is the sixth-largest lake. From the south-eastern end at Sunnan, it is only 10 kilometers (6.2 mi) to Steinkjer, but the waterway is not navigable, with a fall of 24 meters (79 ft).

The first initiative to establish a steamship route on Snåsavatnet was taken by Ole Anton Qvam in the 1860s. He applied Snåsa Municipality for them to buy shares in a steamship company. They municipal council voted against this in 1868 with 8 to 2 votes, with the majority arguing that it was more important to build a road along the south shore of the lake.

Instead what happened was the Steinkjer-based merchant Jakob Sæther established a private company and bought Diana. She sailed to Steinkjer in late 1870, and was the freighted up to the lake on a large, bespoke sled drawn by a large number of horses.

Diana was ready for service when the ice disappeared during the spring of 1871, and put into a route from Sunnan to Viosen, variously criss-crossing the lake. From 1874 she received national government grants, lasting until the road along the lake was completed, in 1879. Despite this, she was never used for postal transport.

Traffic increased gradually through the years. However, it remained unpopular with some of the population. There were complaints that prices were too high, the standard too low and the service lax. Those far from the lake complained when tax money was allocated to pay for quays. Diana was lengthened in 1876 and received a new superstructure in 1879.

By the mid 1885, traffic had reached such a level that Diana was becoming to small. A competing company was therefor established and built the steamship SS Bonden. She was launched in July 1885. Much larger and faster, the operators of Diana chose to terminate her operation.

=== Beitstadfjorden ===
Once retired for use on Snåsavatnet, Diana was transported down to Steinkjer, and used as a tugboat. She ended her days beached in Steinkjer, gradually robbed of all valuable components, before being chopped up for firewood.

== Bibliography ==
- Engvig, Olaf T. (1977). Gamle Dampen: rutebåter på Trondheimsfjorden 1850-1975 (in Norwegian). Trondheim: Adresseavisens Forlag. ISBN 8271640054.
- Engvig, Olaf T. (1978). Innsjødampen : rutebåter på Trøndelags innsjøer 1871-1978 (in Norwegian). Trondheim: Adresseavisens Forlag. ISBN 8271640089.
- Gjelsvik, Tore (1986). Skip og post i lokale ruter i Trøndelag (in Norwegian). Bergen: Filatelistisk Forlag. ISBN 8290272316.
- Sandnes, Jørn (1994). Snåsavatnet: natur, kultur, historie (in Norwegian). Trondheim: Snåsavatnets grunneierlag. ISBN 8299325609.
