= Stod, Trøndelag =

Village in Steinkjer Municipality, Norway

Stod
- Village
- Interactive map of Stod
- Location within Trøndelag Location within Norway
- Coordinates: 64.07094°N 11.67018°E
- Country: Norway
- Region: Central Norway
- County: Trøndelag
- District: Innherred
- Municipality: Steinkjer Municipality
- Elevation: 41 m (135 ft)
- Time zone: UTC+01:00 (CET)
  - Summer (DST): UTC+02:00 (CEST)
- Post Code: 7717 Steinkjer

Stod is a village in Steinkjer Municipality in Trøndelag county, Norway. The rural village is located on the shore of the lake Fossemvatnet, about 11 kilometres (6.8 mi) to the northeast of the town of Steinkjer and about 3 kilometres (1.9 mi) to the southwest of the village of Binde. The village is the namesake for the old Stod Municipality which existed until 1964. For Church is located in the village.
