= List of shipwrecks in 2004 =

The list of shipwrecks in 2004 includes ships sunk, foundered, grounded, or otherwise lost during 2004.

table of contents
2004
Jan	Feb	Mar	Apr
May	Jun	Jul	Aug
Sep	Oct	Nov	Dec
Unknown date

== January ==
=== 15 January ===
List of shipwrecks: 15 January 2004
Ship	State	Description
Bugaled Breizh	France	Bugaled Breizh The trawler capsized and sank 15 nautical miles (28 km) southwest of Lizard Point, Cornwall, United Kingdom. All five crew were killed. The wreck was later raised for investigation.

=== 19 January ===
List of shipwrecks: 19 January 2004
Ship	State	Description
Rocknes	Antigua and Barbuda	Rocknes The bulk carrier struck rocks and capsized at Bergen, Norway (60°22′N 05°1′E) with the loss of eighteen of her thirty-one crew. Salvage of the wreck began on 17 March and ended on 29 March. The ship was towed to Poland for repairs and returned to service in June 2005.

== February ==
=== 2 February ===
List of shipwrecks: 2 February 2004
Ship	State	Description
Unnamed ship	Uganda	A boat capsized on Lake Albert whihle travelling from Bugoigo to Panyamurro with the loss of at least forty people.

=== 5 February ===
List of shipwrecks: 5 February 2004
Ship	State	Description
Two unnamed ferries	Bangladesh	The ferries collided in heavy fog on the River Arial Khan, near the town of Barisal, Bangladesh.

=== 12 February ===
List of shipwrecks: 12 February 2004
Ship	State	Description
Strontsiy	Russia	Loaded with 3,928 tons of scrap metal, the ship broke her anchorage in the Bosphorus Strait and was thrown on the shore. The vessel suffered considerable structural damage, including breaking her back, and was declared a constructive total loss.

=== 13 February ===
List of shipwrecks: 13 February 2004
Ship	State	Description
Hera	Cambodia	Loaded with 11,741 tons of coal, she sank in the Black Sea around 8 miles (13 km) from the entrance of the Bosphorus. All of her nineteen crew was lost.

=== 16 February ===
List of shipwrecks: 16 February 2004
Ship	State	Description
USS Peterson	United States Navy	The decommissioned Spruance-class destroyer was sunk as a target.

=== 23 February ===
List of shipwrecks: 23 February 2004
Ship	State	Description
Asian Noble	South Korea	The bulk carrier foundered off Bering Sea. She was voyaging from Vostochnyy, Russia to Kashima, Japan.

== March ==
=== 2 March ===
List of shipwrecks: 2 March 2004
Ship	State	Description
Herakles and Bulk	Finland	The integrated tug barge ran aground and sank off the Grundkallen lighthouse, Sweden

=== 26 March ===
List of shipwrecks: 26 March 2004
Ship	State	Description
Georgia Moran	United States	The retired 100-foot (30.5 m) tug was scuttled as an artificial reef in the North Atlantic Ocean off Cape May, New Jersey, in 70 feet (21 m) of water at 38°51.465′N 074°42.016′W.
Kings Point	United States	The retired 100-foot (30.5 m) tug was scuttled as an artificial reef in the North Atlantic Ocean off Cape May, New Jersey, in 70 feet (21 m) of water at 38°51.475′N 074°42.029′W.
Lady Dee	United States	The retired 85-foot (25.9 m) fishing trawler was scuttled as an artificial reef in the North Atlantic Ocean off Wildwood, New Jersey, at 38°57.414′N 074°41.500′W.

=== 27 March ===
List of shipwrecks: 27 March 2004
Ship	State	Description
HMS Scylla	Royal Navy	Wreckage of Scylla on 30 May 2015. The decommissioned Leander-class frigate was sunk to form an artificial reef for diving in Whitsand Bay off Cornwall, England, at 50°19.655′N 4°15.162′W.

=== Unknown date ===
List of shipwrecks: Unknown date March 2004
Ship	State	Description
Unidentified crane barge	United States	The crane barge sank in 60 feet (18 m) of water while under tow in the North Atlantic Ocean off New Jersey.

== April ==
=== 6 April ===
List of shipwrecks: 6 April 2004
Ship	State	Description
USS Barbour County	United States Navy	The decommissioned Newport-class tank landing ship was sunk as a target in the Pacific Ocean.

=== 13 April ===
List of shipwrecks: 13 April 2004
Ship	State	Description
USS John Young	United States Navy	The decommissioned Spruance-class destroyer was sunk as a target in the Pacific Ocean by a Mark 48 torpedo fired by the submarine USS Pasadena (United States Navy) during the RIMPAC 04 exercise.

=== 24 April ===
Ship	State	Description
RHIB from USS Firebolt	United States Navy	Iraq War: The rigid inflatable boat (RHIB) was rocked by the explosion of a suicide dhow it was trying to board, capsized and was lost near Khawr Al Amaya Oil Terminal in Iraq. Two US Navy seamen and one US Coast Guard member were killed in the action.

== May ==
=== 10 May ===
List of shipwrecks: 10 May 2004
Ship	State	Description
LeConte	United States	The motor ferry, part of the Alaska Marine Highway System, ran aground without loss of life in Peril Strait near Cozian Reef, about 30 nautical miles (56 km) north of Sitka, Alaska. Her 24 crew members remained aboard to repair and refloat her, but her 86 passengers abandoned ship in life rafts and were rescued, most of them by the National Oceanic and Atmospheric Administration fishery research vessel NOAAS John N. Cobb.

=== 22 May ===
List of shipwrecks: 22 May 2004
Ship	State	Description
Hyundai No.105	South Korea	The car carrier collided with Kamisan (Panama) off Singapore and sank.

=== 23 May ===
List of shipwrecks: 23 May 2004
Ship	State	Description
Lighting Sun	Bangladesh	The ferry capsized during a tropical storm on the Meghna River near Chandpur, Bangladesh.
Two unidentified ferries	Bangladesh	Two unidentified ferries sank 15.5 miles (24.9 km) north-west of Dhaka in Manikganj District, Bangladesh.

== June ==
=== 18 June ===
List of shipwrecks: 18 June 2004
Ship	State	Description
Vickie	United States	The retired 76-foot (23.2 m) fishing trawler was scuttled as an artificial reef in the North Atlantic Ocean south of Long Island 2.5 nautical miles (4.6 km; 2.9 mi) off Moriches Inlet, New York.

=== 24 June ===
List of shipwrecks: 24 June 2004
Ship	State	Description
Kos	Hellenic Navy	The decommissioned Terrebonne Parish-class tank landing ship was sunk as a target during the Hellenic Navy exercise Thiela III by Penguin missiles fired by the fast missile attack craft Ypoploiarchos Degiannis and Simeoforos Starakis and torpedoes from the Greek torpedo boats Lailaps and Typhon (all Hellenic Navy).

=== 28 June ===
List of shipwrecks: 28 June 2004
Ship	State	Description
Ena 2	Germany	The 62.48-metre (205 ft 0 in) sulfuric acid tanker was damaged in a collision with Pudong Senator (Germany) off Hamburg, Germany (53°32′N 09°54′E). She started taking on water and capsized at dock in Hamburg. She was uprighted on 3 July 2004.

== July ==
=== 12 July ===
List of shipwrecks: 12 July 2004
Ship	State	Description
USS Peoria	United States Navy	The decommissioned Newport-class tank landing ship was sunk as a target in the Pacific Ocean off Hawaii during RIMPAC 04.

=== 14 July ===
List of shipwrecks: 14 July 2004
Ship	State	Description
USS Kinkaid	United States Navy	The decommissioned Spruance-class destroyer was sunk as a target in the Pacific Ocean at 22°55′13.5″N 159°59′40.5″W during RIMPAC 04.

=== 15 July ===
List of shipwrecks: 15 July 2004
Ship	State	Description
USS Harry W. Hill	United States Navy	The decommissioned Spruance-class destroyer was sunk as a target in the Pacific Ocean during RIMPAC 04.

=== 22 July ===
List of shipwrecks: 22 July 2004
Ship	State	Description
USS Decatur	United States Navy	The decommissioned Forrest Sherman-class guided-missile destroyer was sunk as a target in the Pacific Ocean off Hawaii at 22°57′00″N 159°55′06″W by aircraft and submarines during RIMPAC 04.

=== 24 July ===
List of shipwrecks: 24 July 2004
Ship	State	Description
Sharon W	United States	The 52-foot (16 m) longline fishing vessel capsized and sank in Marmot Bay off Peril Cape (58°07′30″N 152°16′20″W) on Kodiak Island. The fishing vessel Kathleen K rescued her four-person crew from a skiff.

=== 30 July ===
List of shipwrecks: 30 July 2004
Ship	State	Description
USS Nicholson	United States Navy	The decommissioned Spruance-class destroyer was sunk as a target.

== August ==
=== 4 August ===
List of shipwrecks: 4 August 2004
Ship	State	Description
Provision	United States	Provision aground. After her helmsman fell asleep at her wheel, the 92-foot (28.0 m) fish tender ran aground on the northwest end of Long Island in the Kodiak Archipelago near Kodiak, Alaska. She rolled over and sank on the rocks on 6 August. Her owner had her towed off the rocks on 9 September and scuttled.

=== 5 August ===
List of shipwrecks: 5 August 2004
Ship	State	Description
Mitkof	United States	After her operator fell asleep at her wheel, the 75-foot (22.9 m) fish tender struck a rock and sank approximately 10 nautical miles (19 km; 12 mi) north of Petersburg, Alaska. The fishing vessel Angjenl (United States) rescued her entire crew of four.

=== 8 August ===
List of shipwrecks: 8 August 2004
Ship	State	Description
Java	United States	The 39-foot (11.9 m) fishing vessel capsized and sank in the Shelikof Strait near Uyak Bay (57°48′N 154°04′W) on the coast of Kodiak Island in Alaska′s Kodiak Archipelago. Her crew abandoned ship in a skiff and was rescued by the fishing vessel Lady Aleutian (United States).

=== 20 August ===
List of shipwrecks: 20 August 2004
Ship	State	Description
Samoke	United States	Samoke The 45-foot (13.7 m) fish tender was destroyed off Legma Island (56°49′30″N 135°27′00″W) in Southeast Alaska south of Sitka and west of Goddard by a fire that started in a stove. Her two-man crew reached shore safely and was rescued by the fishing vessel Allure (United States).

=== 23 August ===
List of shipwrecks: 23 August 2004
Ship	State	Description
Fallen Friends	United States	The retired 40-foot (12.2 m) barge was scuttled as an artificial reef in the North Atlantic Ocean off Wildwood, New Jersey, at 38°57.710′N 074°40.990′W.
USS Fife	United States Navy	The decommissioned Spruance-class destroyer was sunk as a target in the Pacific Ocean off Washington by several ships of the United States Third Fleet including the guided-missile destroyer USS Preble and the guided-missile frigate USS Curts (both United States Navy).

=== 25 August ===
List of shipwrecks: 25 August 2004
Ship	State	Description
Golden Stream	United States	The 38-foot (11.6 m) fishing vessel was destroyed off Vallenar Point (55°25′35″N 131°51′00″W) on the coast of Gravina Island in the Alexander Archipelago in Southeast Alaska by a fire that began in her galley stove. Her crew of three survived.

=== 30 August ===
List of shipwrecks: 30 August 2004
Ship	State	Description
Hope	Bangladesh	The cargo ship ran aground during a typhoon near Uwajima, Japan, with a loss of four of her 16 crew. She was declared a total loss. However, she was later repaired and returned to service.

== September ==
=== 13 September ===
List of shipwrecks: 13 September 2004
Ship	State	Description
Delta I	Panama	The tanker collided with APL Pusan (Singapore) in the Arabian Sea off the west coast of India and broke in two. She was declared a total loss and towed to Sachana, India, for scrapping.
Mirabella V	United Kingdom	The super yacht ran aground at Villefranche-sur-Mer, Alpes-Maritimes, France. She was later repaired and returned to service.

=== 16 September ===
List of shipwrecks: 16 September 2004
Ship	State	Description
El Dorado	United States	Hurricane Ivan: The out-of-service cruise/party ship broke free from her dock and drifted six nautical miles (11 km; 6.9 mi) before being driven ashore in West Bay on the coast of Florida. She eventually was refloated.

== October ==
=== 2 October ===
List of shipwrecks: 2 October 2004
Ship	State	Description
Arcata	United States Navy	The Natick-class tugboat was sunk as a target in the Pacific Ocean in 7,890 feet (2,400 m) of water 240 nautical miles (440 km) west of San Diego, California (33°10′12″N 120°57′06″W).

=== 5 October ===
List of shipwrecks: 5 October 2004
Ship	State	Description
HMCS Chicoutimi	Canadian Forces Maritime Command	The long-range hunter-killer submarine was involved in a partial flooding incident which resulted in a fire at sea, whilst she was en route from the United Kingdom to Canada. 2,000 litres (440 imp gal; 530 US gal) of seawater entered the submarine and caused an electrical panel to short out, which in turn started a major fire and caused all power to cut out, leaving the submarine adrift in heavy seas 100 nautical miles (190 km) northwest of County Mayo, Ireland. Nine crewmembers were affected by smoke inhalation and the ship was left drifting without power in heavy seas. By the evening of 7 October, the weather had abated, and Chicoutimi was towed to Faslane Naval Base in Scotland. One crew member died of his injuries.

=== 16 October ===
List of shipwrecks: 16 October 2004
Ship	State	Description
BBC China	Antigua and Barbuda	The 5,548 GT freighter ran aground near Port Grosvenor in South Africa.

=== 17 October ===
List of shipwrecks: 17 October 2004
Ship	State	Description
Susan Ann	United States	The 58-foot (18 m) seiner sank in Chatham Strait near Catherine Island in the Alexander Archipelago in Southeast Alaska. Her two crew members put on survival suits, abandoned ship in a skiff, and survived.

=== 31 October ===
List of shipwrecks: 31 October 2004
Ship	State	Description
Blue Fin	United States	The 42-foot (12.8 m) longline fishing vessel capsized near Ketchikan, Alaska, 2 nautical miles (3.7 km) south of Bold Island (55°15′N 131°25′W) in Southeast Alaska. The vessel Hall Point (United States) rescued her crew of two from her overturned hull. Blue Fin disappeared after the rescue of her crew and was presumed to have sunk in 600 feet (180 m) of water.

== November ==
=== 5 November ===
List of shipwrecks: 5 November 2004
Ship	State	Description
Kelsey Dawn	United States	The 38-foot (11.6 m) troller ran aground and sank at the eastern entrance to Sergius Narrows (57°24′20″N 135°38′00″W) in Southeast Alaska. All four people on board abandoned ship in a skiff and reached shore safely.

=== 10 November ===
List of shipwrecks: 10 November 2004
Ship	State	Description
Captain Bill	United States	The retired 110-foot (33.5 m), 199-gross register ton tug was scuttled as an artificial reef in the North Atlantic Ocean 2 nautical miles (3.7 km; 2.3 mi) off Mantoloking, New Jersey, in 75 feet (23 m) of water at 40°03.104′N 073°59.283′W.

=== 13 November ===
List of shipwrecks: 13 November 2004
Ship	State	Description
USS Hayler	United States Navy	USS Hayler sinking. The decommissioned Spruance-class destroyer was sunk as a target.

=== 14 November ===
List of shipwrecks: 14 November 2004
Ship	State	Description
Eastern Challenger	South Korea	The 105.88-metre (347 ft 5 in) cargo ship was damaged in a collision with Rithi Bhum (Germany) in the Taiwan Straits (22°35′N 116°25′E). Rithi Bhum rescued her crew after they left the ship. She eventually sank after drifting about 9 miles (14 km).
Gosport	United States	The inactivated research ship was sunk as a target.

=== 20 November ===
List of shipwrecks: 20 November 2004
Ship	State	Description
Julie K	United States	The 26-foot (7.9 m) cabin cruiser capsized and was lost approximately 200 yards (180 m) off Horse Island (58°15′15″N 134°43′30″W) in Southeast Alaska west of Juneau, Alaska. The two men and two dogs on board perished.

=== 23 November ===
List of shipwrecks: 23 November 2004
Ship	State	Description
USS Schenectady	United States Navy	The decommissioned Newport-class tank landing ship was sunk as a target ship.

== December ==
=== 5 December ===
List of shipwrecks: 5 December 2004
Ship	State	Description
USS Inchon	United States Navy	The decommissioned Iwo Jima-class amphibious assault ship was sunk as a target in the Atlantic Ocean 207 nautical miles (383 km) east of Virginia Beach, Virginia, at 36°42′30″N 071°40′00″W.

=== 8 December ===
List of shipwrecks: 8 December 2004
Ship	State	Description
Selendang Ayu	Malaysia	Selendang Ayu Two days after losing power while in Unimak Pass during a voyage from Seattle, Washington, to Xiamen, China with a cargo of 60,200 tonnes (66,400 short tons) of soybeans and 1,000 tonnes (1,100 short tons) of fuel oil and a crew of 26, the 738-foot (225 m) bulk carrier ran aground near Skan Bay (53°38′00″N 167°02′30″W) on Unalaska Island in the Aleutian Islands after a tow cable passed to her by the tug Sidney Foss (flag unknown) parted. She broke in two, resulting in Alaska's worst oil spill since that of the Exxon Valdez in 1989. Two United States Coast Guard Sikorsky HH-60J Jayhawk helicopters lifted all 26 crew members from Selendang Ayu's wreck, saving 20 of the crew, but one of the helicopters, carrying seven Selendang Ayu crew members and its own crew of three, crashed after spray from a rogue wave breaking over the wreck engulfed it. A Eurocopter HH-65 Dolphin from the medium endurance cutter USCGC Alex Haley ( United States Coast Guard) rescued the downed Jayhawk's crew and one Selendang Ayu crew member who had been aboard the Jayhawk, but the other six Selendang Ayu crew members aboard the Jayhawk perished in the crash.

=== 16 December ===
List of shipwrecks: 16 December 2004
Ship	State	Description
Julius	Germany	The 15.9-metre (52 ft 2 in) harbor tug capsized when fouled by a towline, and foundered in the Elbe (53°53′N 09°10′E) with the loss of her master. The ship was raised on 19–20 December.

=== 17 December ===
List of shipwrecks: 17 December 2004
Ship	State	Description
Lofotfjord II	Norway	The passenger vessel ran aground on a skerry near Sørvågen, Norway. Of the 36 passengers and crew on board, 31 were saved by the fishing boat Kim Roger (Norway), while the last five were retrieved from the skerry by a Sea King helicopter from No. 330 Squadron RNoAF.

=== 26 December ===
List of shipwrecks: 26 December 2004
Ship	State	Description
PLTD Apung 1	Indonesia	2004 Indian Ocean earthquake and tsunami: The 2,600-ton electricity generation barge was driven inland and deposited on top of two houses by the tsunami at Banda Aceh. The wreck was still in place as of 2012.
Sinar Andalas	Indonesia	2004 Indian Ocean earthquake and tsunami: The 6,693-ton cement carrier partially capsized and sank partially above water at Lhoknga. Four crew were rescued and 19 were reported missing. The wreck was raised or removed sometime after 29 May 2005.
Unknown fishing vessel	Indonesia	2004 Indian Ocean earthquake and tsunami: The 100-foot (30 m) wooden fishing boat was driven inland and deposited several kilometers inland by the tsunami at Ulee Lheue, Banda Aceh. Still in place as of 2020.
Unidentified Thai police patrol boat	Thailand	2004 Indian Ocean earthquake and tsunami: The police patrol boat capsized and sunk at Khao Lak, Thailand. All crew were killed.
813	Thailand	2004 Indian Ocean earthquake and tsunami: The police patrol boat was driven 2 kilometres (1.2 mi) inland at Khao Lak, Thailand. The wreck was left in place as a tsunami memorial.

== Unknown date ==
List of shipwrecks: Unknown date 2004
Ship	State	Description
Commandant Bory	French Navy	The decommissioned Commandant Rivière-class frigate was sunk as a target.
