= Følling =

Village in Steinkjer Municipality, Norway

- Village
- Interactive map of Følling
- Location within Trøndelag Location within Norway
- Coordinates: 64.0999°N 11.5411°E
- Country: Norway
- Region: Central Norway
- County: Trøndelag
- District: Innherred
- Municipality: Steinkjer Municipality
- Elevation: 88 m (289 ft)
- Time zone: UTC+01:00 (CET)
  - Summer (DST): UTC+02:00 (CEST)
- Post Code: 7732 Steinkjer

Følling is a village area in Steinkjer Municipality in Trøndelag county, Norway. It is located at the southwestern end of the lake Snåsavatnet along the European route E6 highway. To the south is the village of Vassaunet and the town of Steinkjer, to the west are the villages of Vellamelen and Beitstad, to the northeast is the village of Kvam, and to the southeast are the villages of Sunnan and Binde. This village is the location of Følling Church.

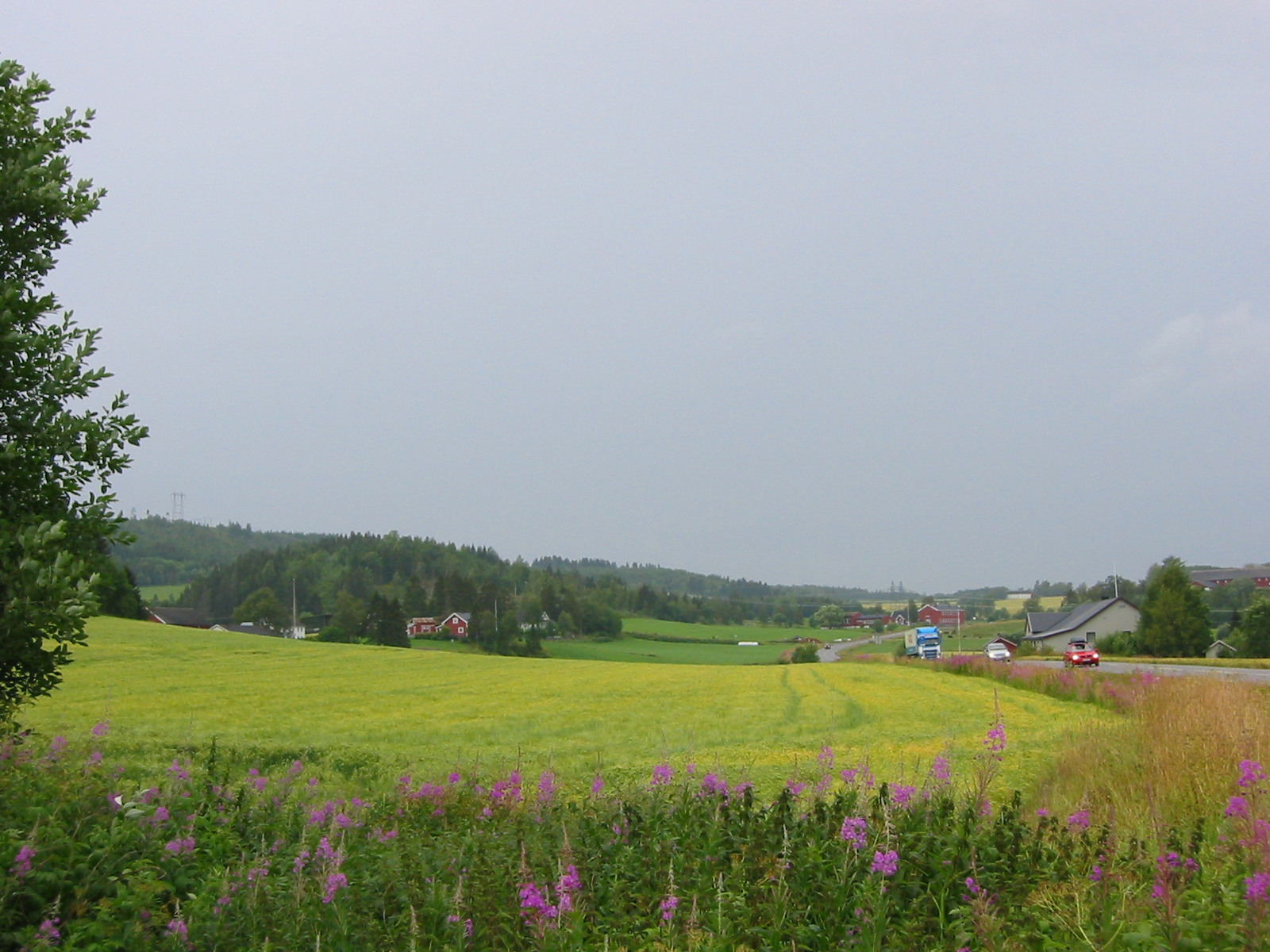
View of the Følling area
