= Binde, Norway =

Village in Steinkjer Municipality, Norway

Binde
- Village
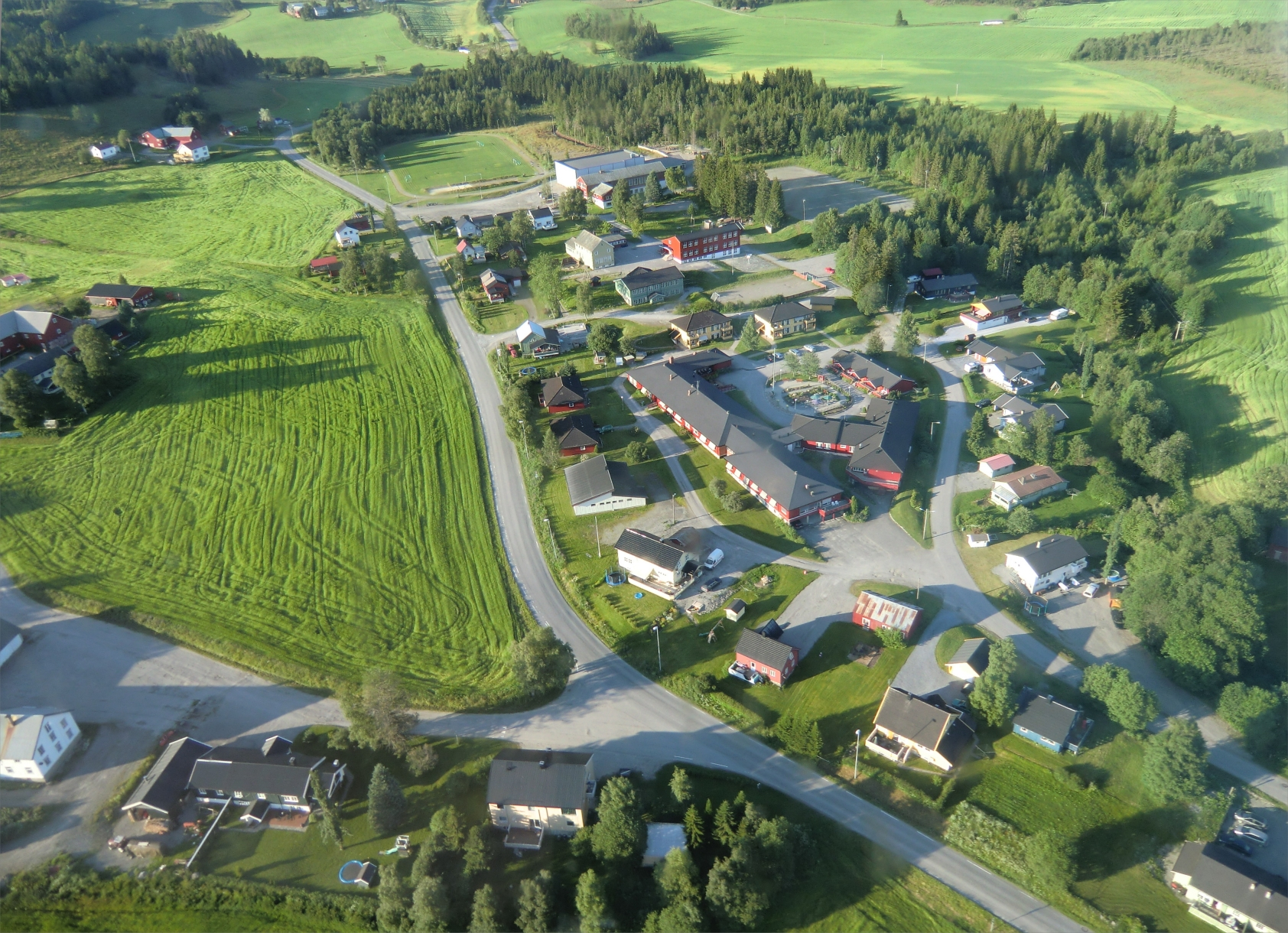
- View of the village
- Interactive map of Binde
- Location within Trøndelag Location within Norway
- Coordinates: 64.0903°N 11.7111°E
- Country: Norway
- Region: Central Norway
- County: Trøndelag
- District: Innherred
- Municipality: Steinkjer Municipality

Area
  - Total: 0.21 km^{2} (0.081 sq mi)
- Elevation: 33 m (108 ft)

Population (2020)
  - Total: 201
  - Density: 957/km^{2} (2,480/sq mi)
- Time zone: UTC+01:00 (CET)
  - Summer (DST): UTC+02:00 (CEST)
- Post Code: 7717 Steinkjer

Binde is a village in Steinkjer Municipality in Trøndelag county, Norway. The village is located south of the lake Snåsavatnet and east of the lake Fossemvatnet. The village of Sundan lies about 5 kilometres (3.1 mi) to the west and the town of Steinkjer lies about 15 kilometres (9.3 mi) to the southwest.

Binde was the administrative center of the old Stod Municipality which existed until 1964. The main church for the area, For Church, lies just south of the village. The village area has schools, shops, and retirement centers.

The 0.21-square-kilometre (52-acre) village had a population (2020) of 201 and a population density of 957 inhabitants per square kilometre (2,480/sq mi). Since 2020, the population and area data for this village area has not been separately tracked by Statistics Norway.
