= For Church =

Church in Trøndelag, Norway

- For kirke
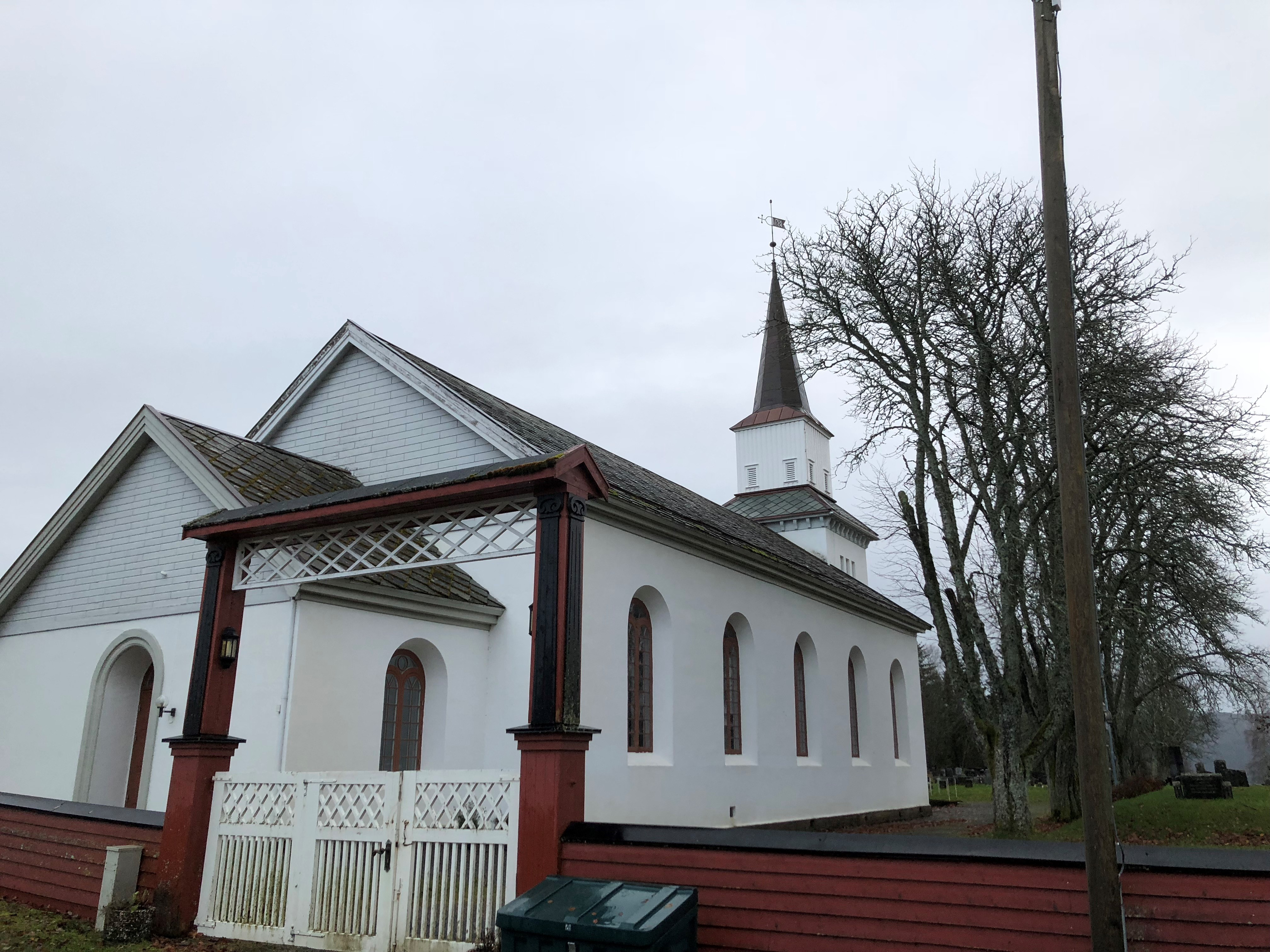
- View of the church
- For Church
- 64.07284775°N 11.68161571°E
- Location: Steinkjer Municipality, Trøndelag
- Country: Norway
- Denomination: Church of Norway
- Churchmanship: Evangelical Lutheran

History
- Former name: Stod kirke
- Status: Parish church
- Founded: 13th century
- Consecrated: 15 Oct 1846

Architecture
- Functional status: Active
- Architect: Hans Linstow
- Architectural type: Long church
- Completed: 1846 (180 years ago)

Specifications
- Capacity: 400
- Materials: Stone

Administration
- Diocese: Nidaros bispedømme
- Deanery: Stiklestad prosti
- Parish: Stod
- Norwegian Cultural Heritage Site
- Type: Church
- Status: Automatically protected
- ID: 85571

For Church (Norwegian: For kirke) is a parish church of the Church of Norway in Steinkjer Municipality in Trøndelag county, Norway. It is located in Stod, just southwest of the village of Binde. It is the church for the Stod parish which is part of the Stiklestad prosti (deanery) in the Diocese of Nidaros. The white, plastered stone church was built in a long church style in 1846 using plans drawn up by the architect Hans Linstow (1787–1851). The church seats about 400 people.

== History ==
The earliest existing historical records of the church date back to the year 1533, but it was not new that year. The first church at For was likely a stave church and it was located about 100 metres (330 ft) east of the present church building (where the main parsonage now stands). In 1648, a new wooden church was built about 100 metres (330 ft) west of the old church. The new church was built with a tall tower and spire. It was consecrated in 1650 by Erik Bredal (1608–1672), the Bishop of the Diocese of Nidaros.

In 1814, this church served as an election church (Norwegian: valgkirke). Together with more than 300 other parish churches across Norway, it was a polling station for elections to the 1814 Norwegian Constituent Assembly which wrote the Constitution of Norway. This was Norway's first national elections. Each church parish was a constituency that elected people called "electors" who later met together in each county to elect the representatives for the assembly that was to meet at Eidsvoll Manor later that year.

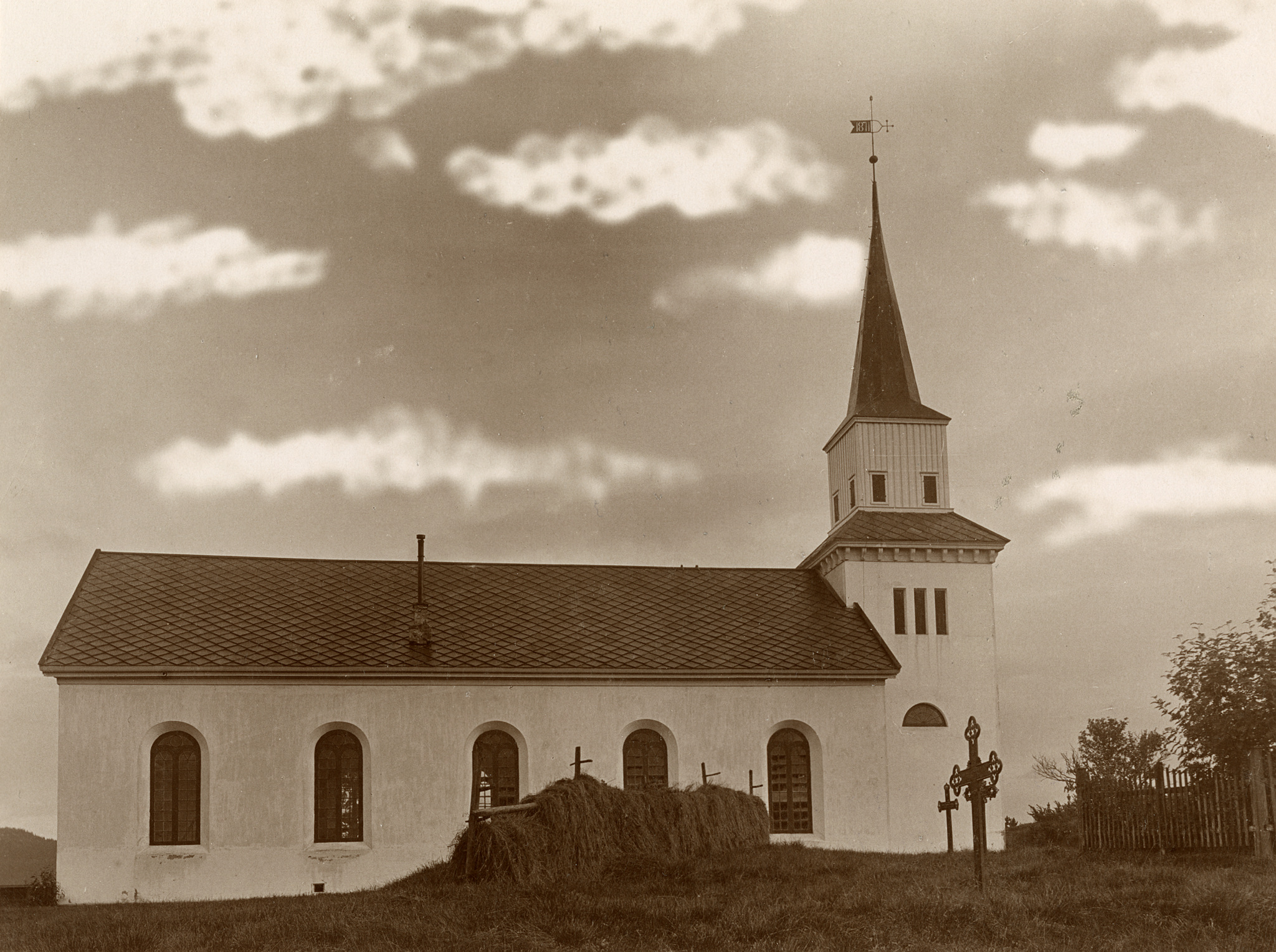
Historic view of the church

After about 200 years of use, the church was in poor condition and the congregation wanted the old church torn down. The service held on 20 July 1845 was the last time the old church was used before its demolition. After clearing the site, a new stone, long church was built, a few meters south of the location of the old building. The new church was designed by the architect Hans Linstow - the only church in Nord-Trøndelag to be designed by him. It was consecrated on 15 October 1846. The old church's pulpit, organ, and baptismal font were installed in the new church. The altarpiece which dated to 1757 was also retained while a new altar was installed for the new church.

In 1871, the relatively new church was renovated. The old dome tower on the roof was removed along with the whole roof. The roof line was restructured and a new entry porch and a new tower was built above the entrance. Rasmus Overrein led the construction. The pews were rebuilt inside and the balcony seating was removed.

== See also ==
- List of churches in Nidaros
