= Henning, Steinkjer =

Village in Steinkjer Municipality, Norway

Henning
- Village
- Interactive map of Henning
- Location within Trøndelag Location within Norway
- Coordinates: 63.9521°N 11.6241°E
- Country: Norway
- Region: Central Norway
- County: Trøndelag
- District: Innherred
- Municipality: Steinkjer Municipality
- Elevation: 128 m (420 ft)
- Time zone: UTC+01:00 (CET)
  - Summer (DST): UTC+02:00 (CEST)
- Post Code: 7711 Steinkjer

Henning is a village in Steinkjer Municipality in Trøndelag county, Norway. The village lies about 10 kilometres (6.2 mi) southeast of the town of Steinkjer, about 7 kilometres (4.3 mi) south of Ogndal, and about 5 kilometres (3.1 mi) north of the lake Leksdalsvatnet. Henning Church is located in the village.
