= Vassaunet =

Village in Steinkjer Municipality, Norway

- Village
- Interactive map of Vassaunet
- Location within Trøndelag Location within Norway
- Coordinates: 64.0584°N 11.4678°E
- Country: Norway
- Region: Central Norway
- County: Trøndelag
- District: Innherred
- Municipality: Steinkjer Municipality
- Elevation: 133 m (436 ft)
- Time zone: UTC+01:00 (CET)
  - Summer (DST): UTC+02:00 (CEST)
- Post Code: 7717 Steinkjer

Vassaunet is a small rural village in Steinkjer Municipality in Trøndelag county, Norway, about 6 kilometres (3.7 mi) north of the town of Steinkjer and about the same distance south from the village of Følling. The village lies just to the west of the European route E6 highway. Approximately 15 people live there, most of them farmers.
