= Henning Church =

Church in Trøndelag, Norway

- Henning kirke
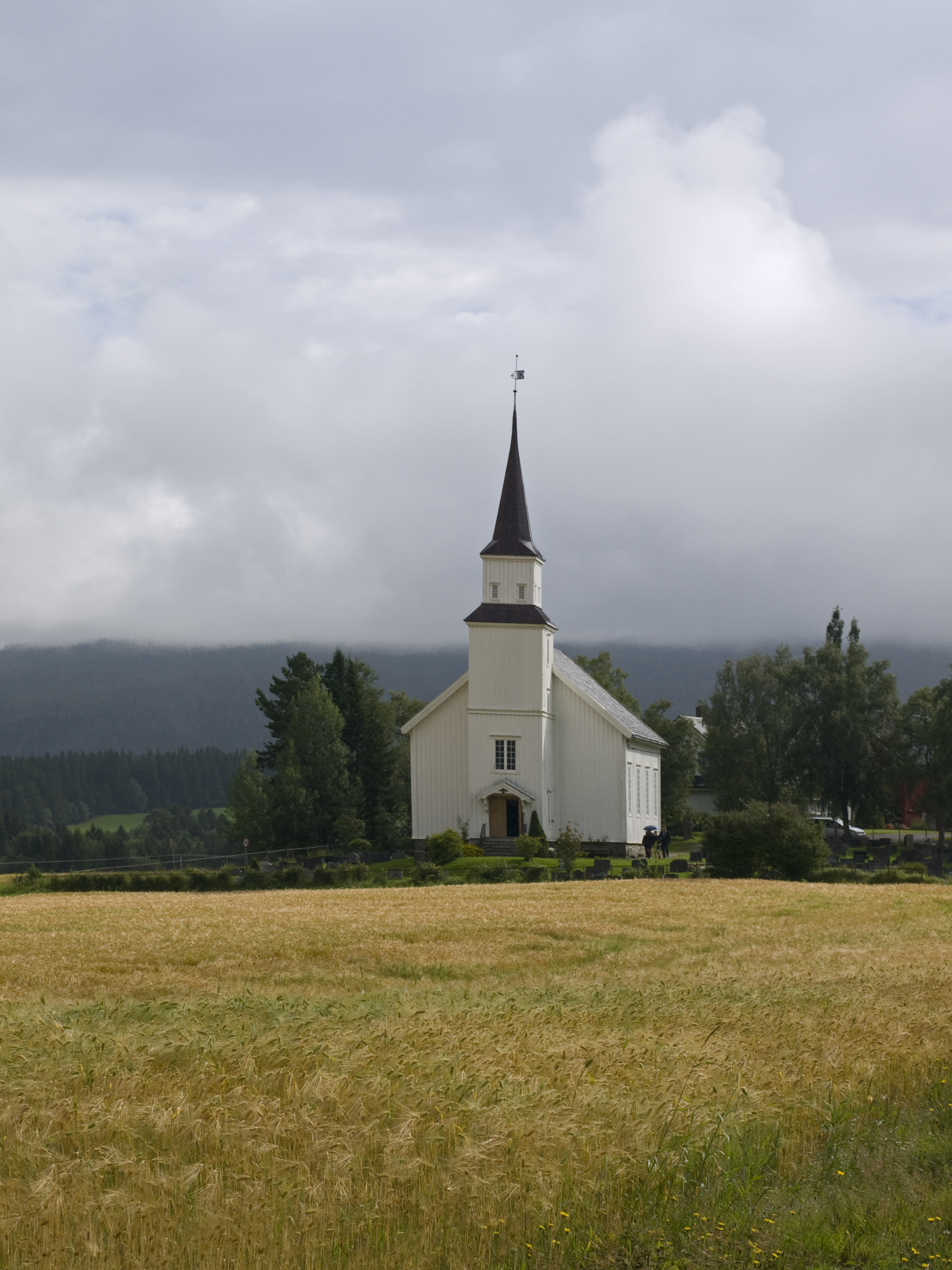
- View of the church
- Henning Church
- 63.95243827°N 11.62393212°E
- Location: Henning, Steinkjer Municipality, Trøndelag
- Country: Norway
- Denomination: Church of Norway
- Churchmanship: Evangelical Lutheran

History
- Status: Parish church
- Founded: 13th century
- Consecrated: 5 Dec 1872

Architecture
- Functional status: Active
- Architect: Rasmus Mentsen Overrein
- Architectural type: Long church
- Completed: 1872 (154 years ago)

Specifications
- Capacity: 360
- Materials: Wood

Administration
- Diocese: Nidaros bispedømme
- Deanery: Stiklestad prosti
- Parish: Henning
- Norwegian Cultural Heritage Site
- Type: Church
- Status: Automatically protected
- ID: 84551

Henning Church (Norwegian: Henning kirke) is a parish church of the Church of Norway in Steinkjer Municipality in Trøndelag county, Norway. It is located in the village of Henning. It is the church for the Henning parish which is part of the Stiklestad prosti (deanery) in the Diocese of Nidaros. The white, wooden church was built in a long church style in 1872 using plans drawn up by the architect Rasmus M. Overrein. The church seats about 360 people.

== History ==
The earliest existing historical records of the church date back to the year 1533, but the church was not new that year. The first church here was likely a stave church that was built in the 13th century. Historically, the church was known as the Bagabu kirke, using the old name for the Henning area. The baptismal font for the church is dated to the year 1250-1275, meaning that could be when the church was built.

In 1652, the old church was torn down and replaced with a new church on the same site. In 1725, Janus Claudius Gedde purchased the church from the King at the Norwegian church sale when the King sold off many churches to help pay down the debt for the Great Northern War. In 1742, the church was torn down and replaced with a new church on the same site. This was a small long church that had a red painted exterior. It was also very dark inside with only two small windows on each long wall of the nave and one window on each side of the choir. In 1813, the church was sold to the parish by David Andreas Gram, who owned the church at that time. In 1868, the parish decided to build a new church. In 1870, the church was torn down and replaced with a new church on the same site. The foundation stone of the new church was laid on 11 June 1870. The new long church was consecrated and put into use on 5 December 1872. A new floor was laid in 1968, and in 1971 the church was painted inside. The tower was restored in 2008.

== See also ==
- List of churches in Nidaros
