= Følling Church =

Church in Trøndelag, Norway

- Følling kirke
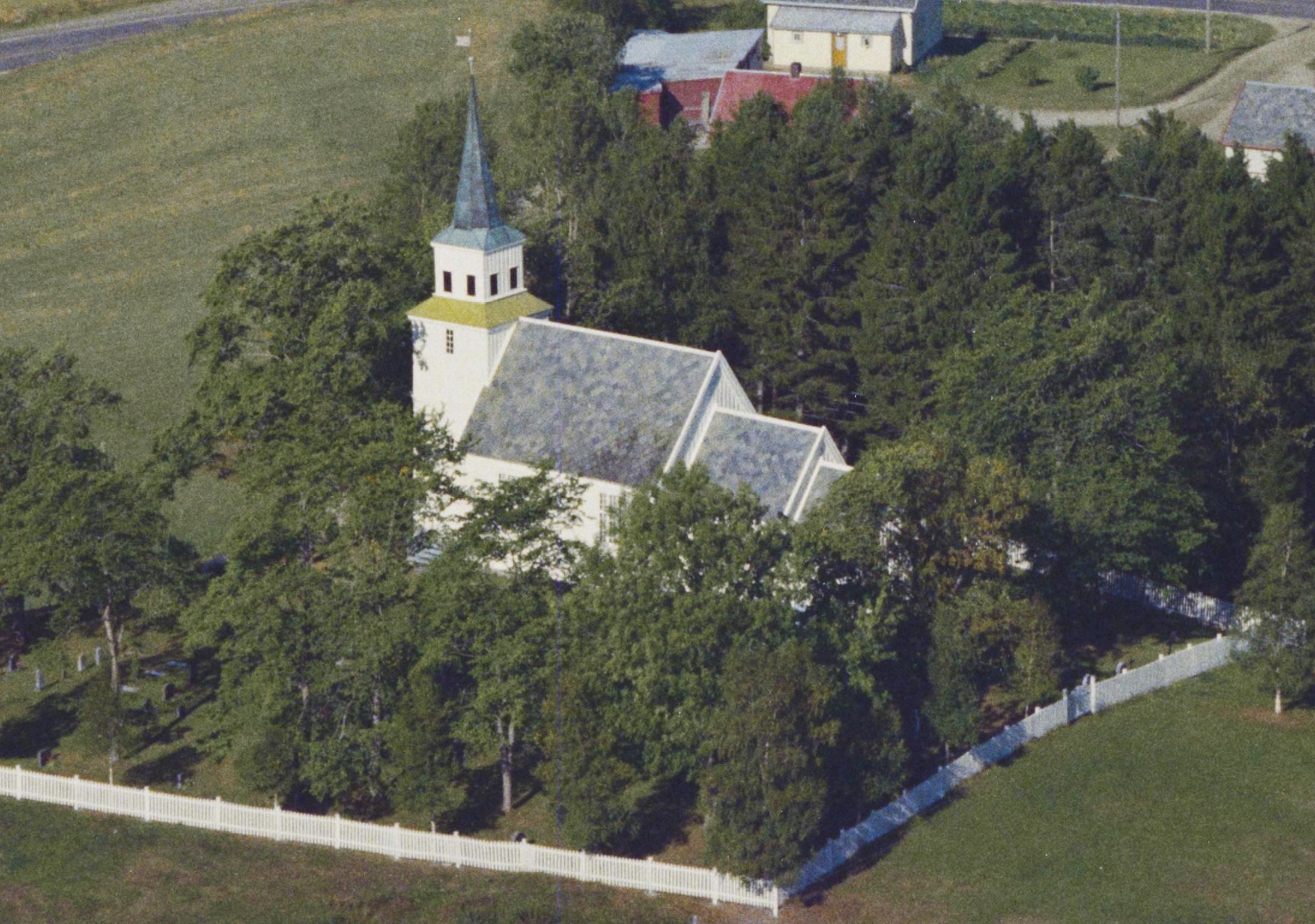
- View of the church
- Følling Church
- 64.10331907°N 11.54481098°E
- Location: Steinkjer Municipality, Trøndelag
- Country: Norway
- Denomination: Church of Norway
- Churchmanship: Evangelical Lutheran

History
- Status: Parish church
- Founded: 14th century
- Consecrated: 1726

Architecture
- Functional status: Active
- Architectural type: Long church
- Completed: 1726 (300 years ago)

Specifications
- Capacity: 120
- Materials: Wood

Administration
- Diocese: Nidaros bispedømme
- Deanery: Stiklestad prosti
- Parish: Følling
- Norwegian Cultural Heritage Site
- Type: Church
- Status: Automatically protected
- ID: 84220

Følling Church (Norwegian: Følling kirke) is a parish church of the Church of Norway in Steinkjer Municipality in Trøndelag county, Norway. It is located in the village of Følling. It is the church for the Følling parish which is part of the Stiklestad prosti (deanery) in the Diocese of Nidaros. The white, wooden church was built in a long church style in 1726 using plans drawn up by an unknown architect. The church seats about 120 people.

== History ==
The earliest existing historical records of the church date back to the year 1533, but the church was not new that year. The first church on the site was a 4.5-by-5-metre (15 ft × 16 ft) stave church that may have been built in the 14th century on an old religious site from pre-Christian times. Around the year 1614, the nave was enlarged and in 1646 the choir was repaired.

Around the year 1692, a royal commissions ordered the parish to close the old, dilapidated church, but the local congregation resisted and they maintained the church on their own until 1720 when they finally tore down the old church. A new timber-framed long church was constructed on the same site in 1726.

The church was renovated in 1872, 1884, and 1959. During the renovation in 1959, tombs under the church floor were discovered that dated back to the Bronze Age. They also found coins under the church from the 14th century. The 1959 renovation was quite extensive. It was led by the architect John Egil Tverdahl. After the work was completed, the church was re-consecrated on 29 November 1959.

== See also ==
- List of churches in Nidaros
