= Fossemvatnet =

Lake in Trøndelag, Norway

- Interactive map of the lake
- Location: Steinkjer Municipality, Trøndelag
- Coordinates: 64.0626°N 11.6227°E
- Basin countries: Norway
- Max. length: 3 kilometres (1.9 mi)
- Max. width: 1.5 kilometres (0.93 mi)
- Surface area: 3.72 km^{2} (1.44 sq mi)
- Shore length^{1}: 11 kilometres (6.8 mi)
- Surface elevation: 18 metres (59 ft)
- References: NVE
- ^{1} Shore length is not a well-defined measure.

Fossemvatnet is a lake in Steinkjer Municipality in Trøndelag county, Norway.

The 3.72-square-kilometre (1.44 sq mi) lake lies just southwest of the large lake Snåsavatnet which flows into Fossemvatnet on its way to the Trondheimsfjord. The village of Sunnan lies on the northern shore of the lake.

== See also ==
- List of lakes in Norway
