= Steinkjer Municipality =

Municipality in Trøndelag, Norway

Steinkjer Municipality Steinkjer kommune Stïentjen tjïelte
- Municipality
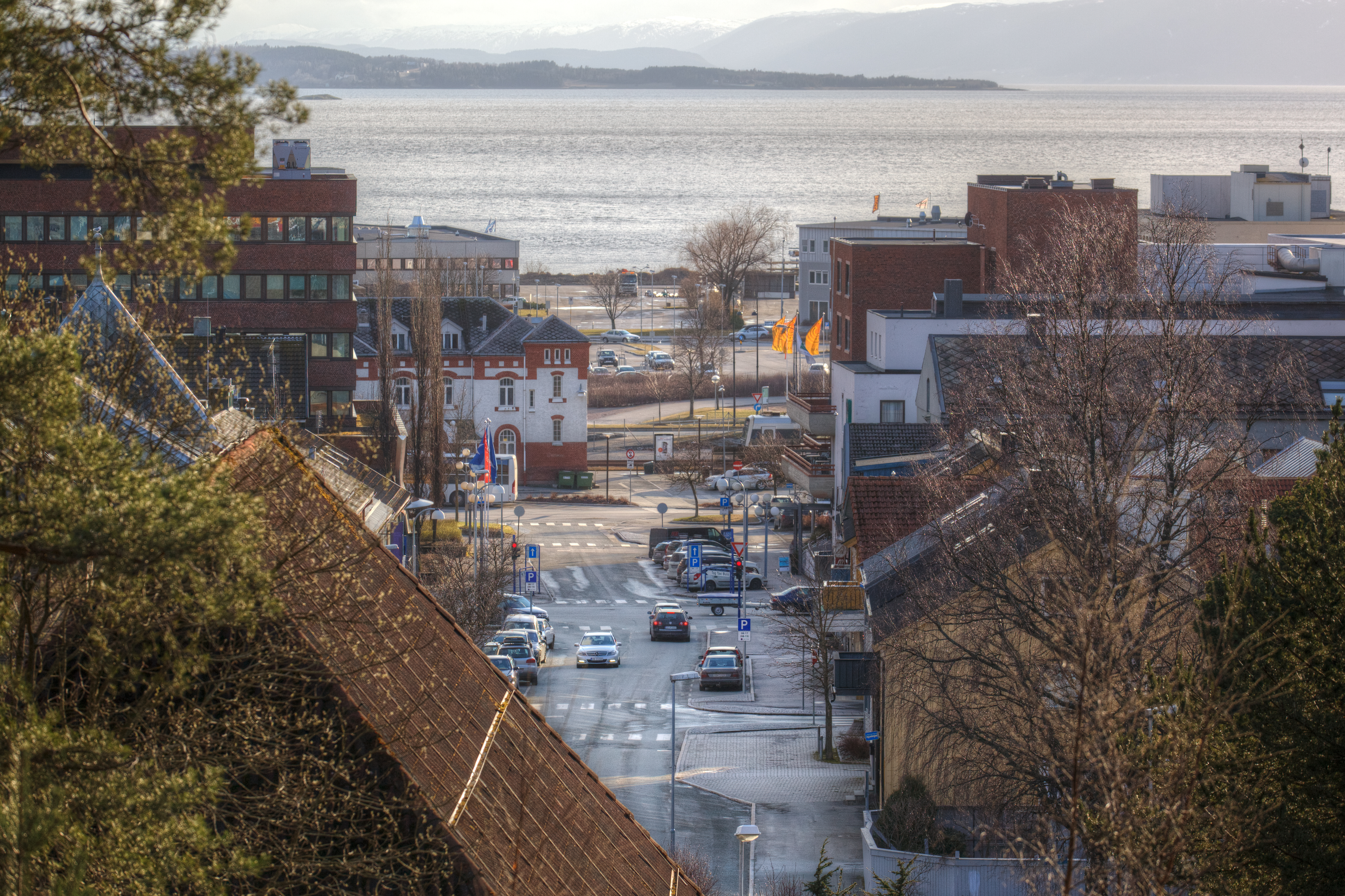
- Central Steinkjer in mid-April 2015

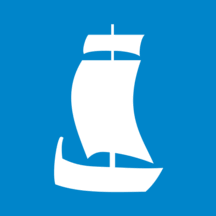
- Flag Coat of arms

- Trøndelag within Norway

- Steinkjer within Trøndelag
- Coordinates: 64°03′29″N 11°43′08″E
- Country: Norway
- County: Trøndelag
- District: Innherad
- Established: 23 Jan 1858
  - Preceded by: Stod Municipality
- Administrative centre: Steinkjer

Government
  - Mayor (2023): Gunnar Thorsen (Ap)

Area
  - Total: 2,122.06 km^{2} (819.33 sq mi)
  - Land: 1,937.21 km^{2} (747.96 sq mi)
  - Water: 184.85 km^{2} (71.37 sq mi) 8.7%
  - Rank: #31 in Norway
- Highest elevation: 818.64 m (2,685.8 ft)

Population (2024)
  - Total: 24,032
  - Rank: #54 in Norway
  - Density: 11.3/km^{2} (29/sq mi)
  - Change (10 years): ▼ −0.4%
- Demonym: Steinkjerbygg

Official language
  - Norwegian form: Neutral
- Time zone: UTC+01:00 (CET)
  - Summer (DST): UTC+02:00 (CEST)
- ISO 3166 code: NO-5006
- Website: Official website

Steinkjer or Stïentje (Southern Sami) is a municipality in Trøndelag county, Norway. It is part of the Innherad region. The administrative centre of the municipality is the town of Steinkjer which is located on the inner part of the Trondheimsfjord. The town is also the administrative centre for Trøndelag county. Other populated areas in Steinkjer include the villages of Bartnes, Beitstad, Binde, Byafossen, Follafoss, Følling, Gaulstad, Henning, Hyllbrua, Kvam, Lerkehaug, Malm, Mære, Sela, Skei, Sparbu, Stod, Sunnan, Vassaunet, Vellamelen, and Verrastranda.

The 2,122-square-kilometre (819 sq mi) municipality is the 31st largest by area out of the 357 municipalities in Norway. Steinkjer Municipality is the 54th most populous municipality in Norway with a population of 24,032. The municipality's population density is 11.3 inhabitants per square kilometre (29/sq mi) and its population has decreased by 0.4% over the previous 10-year period.

== General information ==
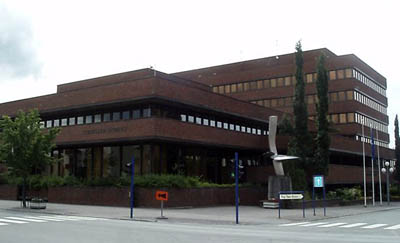
Steinkjer town hall

The village of Steinkjer in Stod Municipality was declared a ladested (town) in 1857, and then on 23 January 1858 it was separated from Stod Municipality to form a municipality of its own. The initial population of Steinkjer Municipality was 1,150.

Over time, as the town grew, land was annexed from the neighboring municipalities. It started on 1 January 1902 when an unpopulated area from the neighboring Ogndal Municipality was taken for future growth of Steinkjer. Then in 1941, an area (population: 57) was taken from Ogndal Municipality to be added to Steinkjer. Again, in 1948, an area (population: 78) was transferred from Ogndal Municipality and another area (population: 70) was transferred from Egge Municipality.

During the 1960s, there were many municipal mergers across Norway due to the work of the Schei Committee. On 1 January 1964, a large municipal merger took place involving six rural municipalities and the town of Steinkjer. The following places were merged to form a new, larger Steinkjer Municipality:

- the town of Steinkjer (population: 4,325)
- Sparbu Municipality (population: 4,027)
- Egge Municipality (population: 3,476)
- Ogndal Municipality (population: 2,678)
- Beitstad Municipality (population: 2,563)
- Stod Municipality (population: 1,268)
- Kvam Municipality (population: 1,245)

On 1 January 2018, Steinkjer Municipality was switched from the old Nord-Trøndelag county to the newly-formed Trøndelag county.

On 1 January 2020, Steinkjer Municipality and most of the neighboring Verran Municipality were merged to form a new, larger Steinkjer Municipality.

=== Toponymy ===
The municipality (originally the town) is named after the old Steinkjer farm (Old Norse: Steinker) since the town was built on the site of the old farm. The first element is steinn (m) which means "stone" or "rock". The last element is ker (n) which means a "barrier made for catching fish" or "container".

=== Coat of arms ===
Current arms since 1 January 2020

Arms used from 1957 until 2019

The current coat of arms was approved in October 2018 for use starting on 1 January 2020 after the merger of Steinkjer and Verran municipalities (these arms were previously the arms for Verran from 1987 until 2019). The official blazon is "Azure, a boat with raised square sail and topsail argent" (Norwegian: I blått en sølv båt med råseil og toppseil). This means the arms have a blue field (background) and the charge is a Veranjekt (boat) with a raised square sail and topsail. The boat has a tincture of argent which means it is commonly colored white, but if it is made out of metal, then silver is used. The design was chosen to symbolize the historical importance of boating and boatbuilding for the area. The Veranjekt (literally translated as "a yacht from Verran") is a type of boat has been built in Verran for centuries. The arms were designed by Rolf Tidemann. The municipal flag has the same design as the coat of arms.

The previous coat of arms was originally granted on 8 March 1957 to the town of Steinkjer. Then on 14 March 1964, they were re-granted to the newly enlarged Steinkjer Municipality. They were in use until 1 January 2020 when the municipality was enlarged again and a new coat of arms was put into use. The official blazon was "Azure, a mullet of six argent" (Norwegian: På blå bunn en sølv stjerne med seks odder). This means the arms had a blue field (background) and the charge was a six-pointed star. The star had a tincture of argent which meant it was commonly colored white, but if it was made out of metal, then silver was used. The original meaning of the star was that six main roads crossed in the town of Steinkjer. After the municipal reorganization in 1964, the arms were re-granted, but the meaning was slightly changed. The town of Steinkjer now formed the centre of the municipality and the points were directed to the six other districts (former municipalities) in the new, large Steinkjer Municipality. The six districts were Beitstad, Egge, Kvam, Ogndal, Sparbu, and Stod. The arms were designed by Hallvard Trætteberg. The municipal flag had the same design as the coat of arms.

=== Churches ===
The Church of Norway has nine parishes (sokn) within Steinkjer Municipality. It is part of the Nord-Innherad prosti (deanery) in the Diocese of Nidaros.

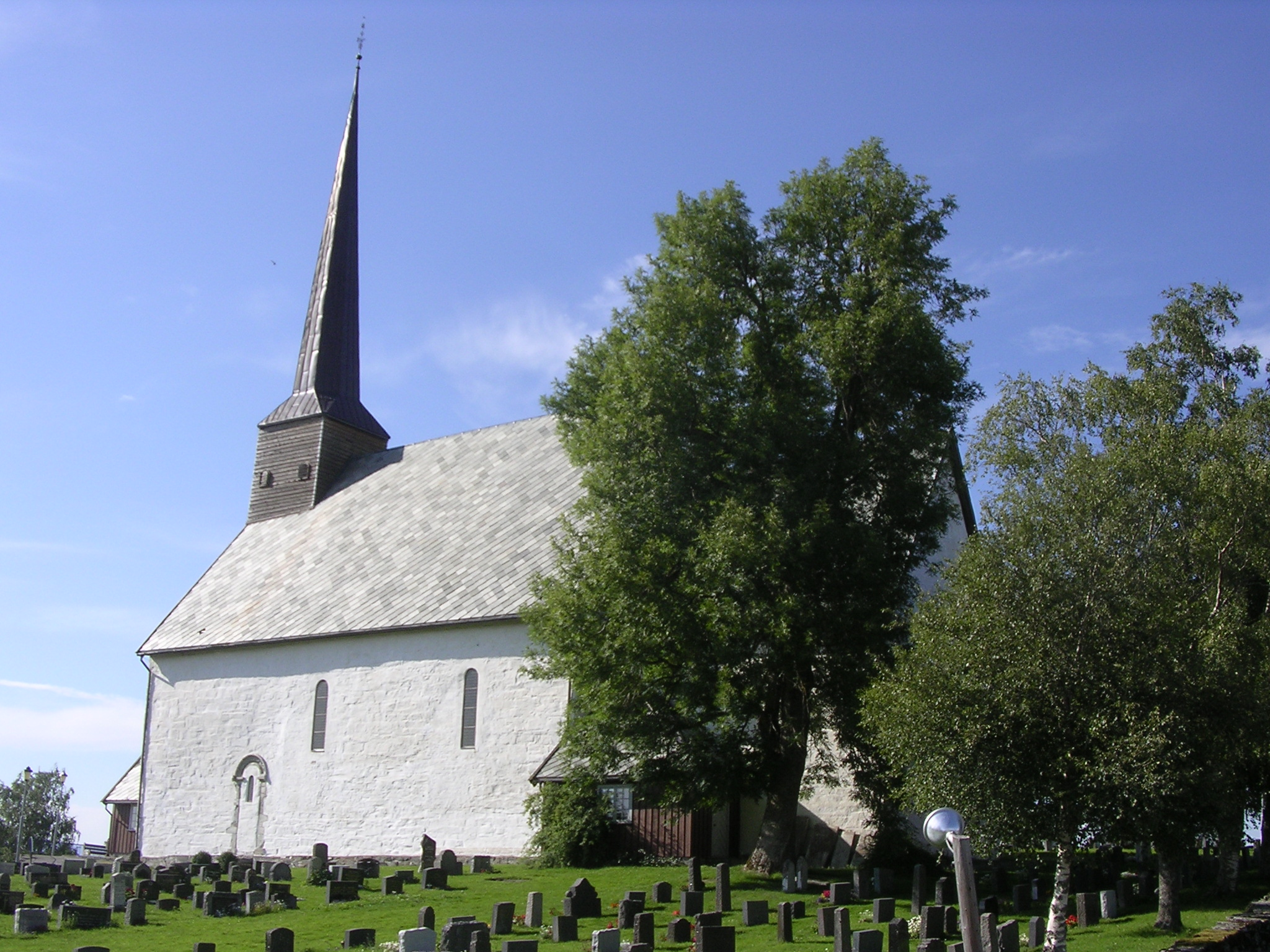
The medieval Mære church

Churches in Steinkjer Municipality
Parish (sokn)	Church name	Location of the church	Year built
Beitstad	Beitstad Church	Beitstad	1869
Beitstad	Bartnes Church	Bartnes	1960
Egge	Egge Church	Egge in Steinkjer	1767
Følling	Følling Church	Følling	1726
Henning	Henning Church	Henning	1872
Kvam	Kvam Church	Kvam	1878
Malm	Malm Church	Malm	1885
Malm	Sela Church	Sela	1997
Mære	Mære Church	Mære	c. 1150
Ogndal	Skei Church	Skei	1664
Ogndal	Bodom Church	Ogndalen	1905
Steinkjer	Steinkjer Church	Steinkjer	1965
Stod	For Church	Stod	1846
Verran	Follafoss Church	Follafoss	1954

== History ==
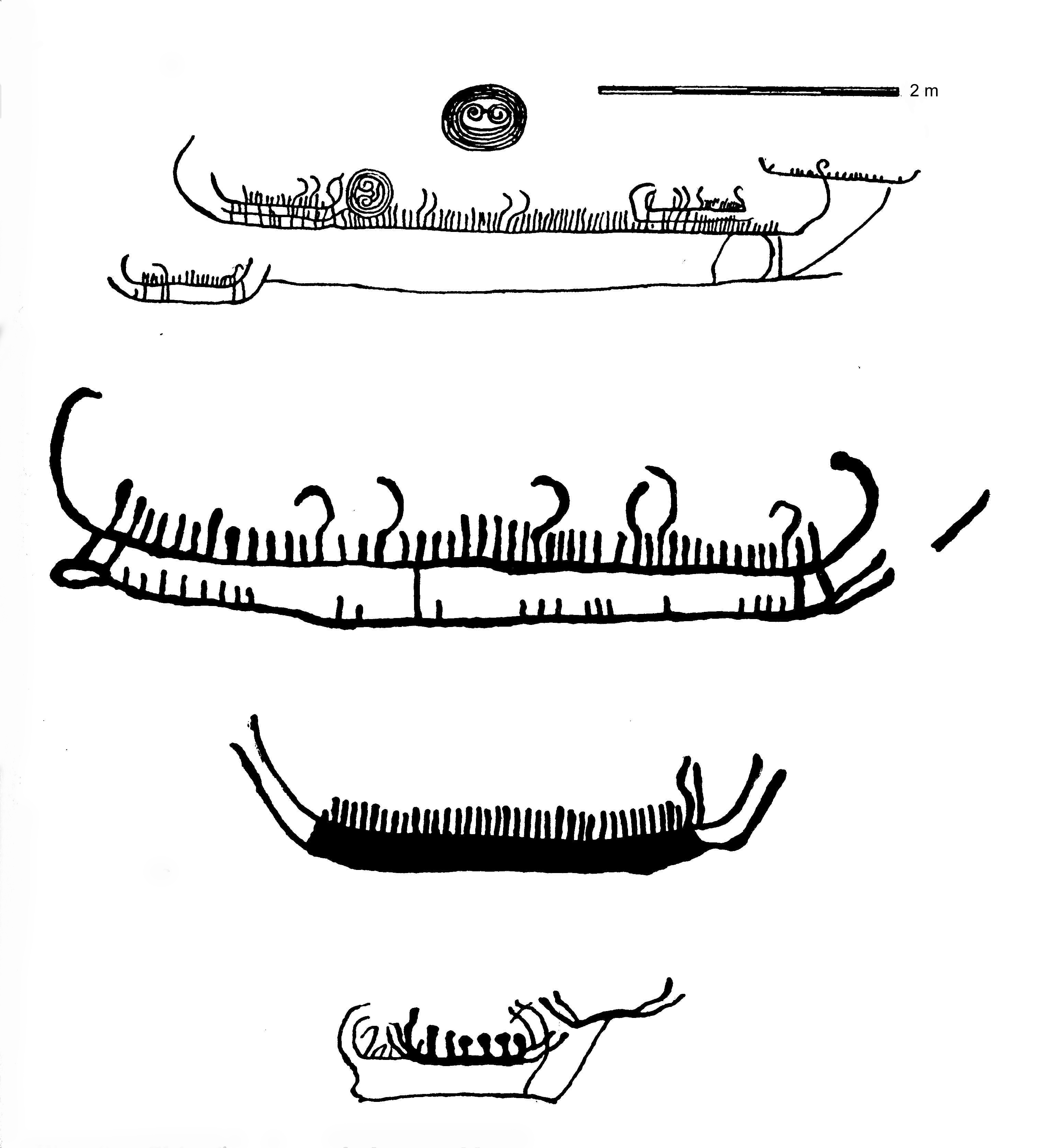
Bronze Age rock carvings at Bardal rock carvings.

The Steinkjer area has been populated since the Stone Age, as shown by the Bølareinen rock carving, which depicts an almost life-sized reindeer and a bear. There are other rock carvings in the area as well, as in Bardal rock carvings, the oldest up to 6,000 years old.

Mære was a Norse religious place with sacrifices and seasonal gatherings (Norwegian: Hov) before Christianity came to Norway.

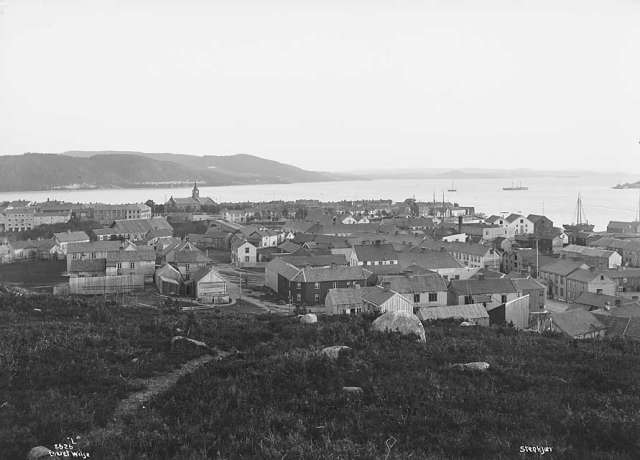
Steinkjer in 1880

Steinkjer has survived two major disasters in modern history. The first was a town-wide fire in the year 1900, which burned down much of the southern parts of the town. The second disaster happened on 21 and 22 April 1940, when the town was struck by Luftwaffe bombers during the Norwegian campaign. Most of the town was destroyed, but no people died.

The attack destroyed a large part of the town of Steinkjer, and many priceless historical buildings, such as the old, cruciform Steinkjer Church were lost. The town was, however, quickly rebuilt after 1945 with much aid from the United States. Much of the architecture of modern Steinkjer originates from the 1950s and 1960s with architecture inspired by functionalism rather than the aestheticism of the earlier Art Nouveau style to be seen in such cities as Trondheim and Ålesund. A few historical buildings – for example, the railway station and the town's college – survived the bombing. These are buildings based on the neoclassical architectural style known as Jugendstil. Good examples are the aforementioned railway station (jernbanestasjonen) and the administration building of Nord-Trøndelag University College (Norwegian: Høgskolen i Nord-Trøndelag).

== Government ==
Steinkjer Municipality is responsible for primary education (through 10th grade), outpatient health services, senior citizen services, welfare and other social services, zoning, economic development, and municipal roads and utilities. The municipality is governed by a municipal council of directly elected representatives. The mayor is indirectly elected by a vote of the municipal council. The municipality is under the jurisdiction of the Trøndelag District Court and the Frostating Court of Appeal.

=== Municipal council ===
The municipal council (Kommunestyre) of Steinkjer Municipality is made up of 39 representatives that are elected to four year terms. The tables below show the current and historical composition of the council by political party.

Steinkjer kommunestyre 2023–2027
Party name (in Norwegian)	Number of representatives
Labour Party (Arbeiderpartiet)	13
Progress Party (Fremskrittspartiet)	2
Conservative Party (Høyre)	5
Industry and Business Party (Industri‑ og Næringspartiet)	3
Pensioners' Party (Pensjonistpartiet)	2
Red Party (Rødt)	3
Centre Party (Senterpartiet)	8
Socialist Left Party (Sosialistisk Venstreparti)	2
Liberal Party (Venstre)	1
Total number of members:	39

Steinkjer kommunestyre 2019–2023
Party name (in Norwegian)	Number of representatives
Labour Party (Arbeiderpartiet)	13
Progress Party (Fremskrittspartiet)	2
Green Party (Miljøpartiet De Grønne)	1
Conservative Party (Høyre)	3
Red Party (Rødt)	3
Centre Party (Senterpartiet)	22
Socialist Left Party (Sosialistisk Venstreparti)	2
Liberal Party (Venstre)	1
Total number of members:	47
Note: On 1 January 2020, most of Verran Municipality became part of Steinkjer Municipality.

Steinkjer kommunestyre 2015–2019
Party name (in Norwegian)	Number of representatives
Labour Party (Arbeiderpartiet)	17
Progress Party (Fremskrittspartiet)	2
Green Party (Miljøpartiet De Grønne)	2
Conservative Party (Høyre)	3
Christian Democratic Party (Kristelig Folkeparti)	1
Centre Party (Senterpartiet)	19
Socialist Left Party (Sosialistisk Venstreparti)	2
Liberal Party (Venstre)	1
Total number of members:	47

Steinkjer kommunestyre 2011–2015
Party name (in Norwegian)	Number of representatives
Labour Party (Arbeiderpartiet)	18
Progress Party (Fremskrittspartiet)	4
Conservative Party (Høyre)	4
Christian Democratic Party (Kristelig Folkeparti)	1
Centre Party (Senterpartiet)	16
Socialist Left Party (Sosialistisk Venstreparti)	2
Liberal Party (Venstre)	2
Total number of members:	47

Steinkjer kommunestyre 2007–2011
Party name (in Norwegian)	Number of representatives
Labour Party (Arbeiderpartiet)	17
Progress Party (Fremskrittspartiet)	7
Conservative Party (Høyre)	3
Christian Democratic Party (Kristelig Folkeparti)	1
Centre Party (Senterpartiet)	14
Socialist Left Party (Sosialistisk Venstreparti)	3
Liberal Party (Venstre)	2
Total number of members:	47

Steinkjer kommunestyre 2003–2007
Party name (in Norwegian)	Number of representatives
Labour Party (Arbeiderpartiet)	16
Progress Party (Fremskrittspartiet)	5
Conservative Party (Høyre)	4
Christian Democratic Party (Kristelig Folkeparti)	1
Centre Party (Senterpartiet)	11
Socialist Left Party (Sosialistisk Venstreparti)	6
Liberal Party (Venstre)	4
Total number of members:	47

Steinkjer kommunestyre 1999–2003
Party name (in Norwegian)	Number of representatives
Labour Party (Arbeiderpartiet)	22
Progress Party (Fremskrittspartiet)	4
Conservative Party (Høyre)	4
Christian Democratic Party (Kristelig Folkeparti)	2
Centre Party (Senterpartiet)	13
Socialist Left Party (Sosialistisk Venstreparti)	3
Liberal Party (Venstre)	3
Total number of members:	51

Steinkjer kommunestyre 1995–1999
Party name (in Norwegian)	Number of representatives
Labour Party (Arbeiderpartiet)	20
Progress Party (Fremskrittspartiet)	2
Conservative Party (Høyre)	4
Christian Democratic Party (Kristelig Folkeparti)	1
Centre Party (Senterpartiet)	19
Socialist Left Party (Sosialistisk Venstreparti)	3
Liberal Party (Venstre)	2
Total number of members:	51

Steinkjer kommunestyre 1991–1995
Party name (in Norwegian)	Number of representatives
Labour Party (Arbeiderpartiet)	20
Progress Party (Fremskrittspartiet)	2
Conservative Party (Høyre)	6
Christian Democratic Party (Kristelig Folkeparti)	1
Centre Party (Senterpartiet)	21
Socialist Left Party (Sosialistisk Venstreparti)	9
Liberal Party (Venstre)	2
Total number of members:	61

Steinkjer kommunestyre 1987–1991
Party name (in Norwegian)	Number of representatives
Labour Party (Arbeiderpartiet)	26
Progress Party (Fremskrittspartiet)	3
Conservative Party (Høyre)	7
Christian Democratic Party (Kristelig Folkeparti)	1
Red Electoral Alliance (Rød Valgallianse)	1
Centre Party (Senterpartiet)	16
Socialist Left Party (Sosialistisk Venstreparti)	3
Liberal Party (Venstre)	4
Total number of members:	61

Steinkjer kommunestyre 1983–1987
Party name (in Norwegian)	Number of representatives
Labour Party (Arbeiderpartiet)	26
Conservative Party (Høyre)	10
Christian Democratic Party (Kristelig Folkeparti)	2
Red Electoral Alliance (Rød Valgallianse)	1
Centre Party (Senterpartiet)	15
Socialist Left Party (Sosialistisk Venstreparti)	3
Liberal Party (Venstre)	4
Total number of members:	61

Steinkjer kommunestyre 1979–1983
Party name (in Norwegian)	Number of representatives
Labour Party (Arbeiderpartiet)	26
Conservative Party (Høyre)	9
Christian Democratic Party (Kristelig Folkeparti)	2
New People's Party (Nye Folkepartiet)	1
Centre Party (Senterpartiet)	15
Socialist Left Party (Sosialistisk Venstreparti)	2
Liberal Party (Venstre)	6
Total number of members:	61

Steinkjer kommunestyre 1975–1979
Party name (in Norwegian)	Number of representatives
Labour Party (Arbeiderpartiet)	26
Conservative Party (Høyre)	6
Christian Democratic Party (Kristelig Folkeparti)	3
New People's Party (Nye Folkepartiet)	1
Centre Party (Senterpartiet)	18
Socialist Left Party (Sosialistisk Venstreparti)	2
Liberal Party (Venstre)	5
Total number of members:	61

Steinkjer kommunestyre 1971–1975
Party name (in Norwegian)	Number of representatives
Labour Party (Arbeiderpartiet)	29
Conservative Party (Høyre)	5
Christian Democratic Party (Kristelig Folkeparti)	2
Centre Party (Senterpartiet)	17
Liberal Party (Venstre)	8
Total number of members:	61

Steinkjer kommunestyre 1967–1971
Party name (in Norwegian)	Number of representatives
Labour Party (Arbeiderpartiet)	30
Conservative Party (Høyre)	6
Christian Democratic Party (Kristelig Folkeparti)	2
Centre Party (Senterpartiet)	16
Liberal Party (Venstre)	7
Total number of members:	61

Steinkjer kommunestyre 1963–1967
Party name (in Norwegian)	Number of representatives
Labour Party (Arbeiderpartiet)	31
Conservative Party (Høyre)	6
Christian Democratic Party (Kristelig Folkeparti)	1
Centre Party (Senterpartiet)	17
Liberal Party (Venstre)	6
Total number of members:	61
Note: On 1 January 1964, a major municipal merger took place, greating increasing the size and population of the municipality.

Steinkjer bystyre 1959–1963
Party name (in Norwegian)	Number of representatives
Labour Party (Arbeiderpartiet)	15
Conservative Party (Høyre)	7
Christian Democratic Party (Kristelig Folkeparti)	2
Centre Party (Senterpartiet)	1
Liberal Party (Venstre)	4
Total number of members:	29

Steinkjer bystyre 1955–1959
Party name (in Norwegian)	Number of representatives
Labour Party (Arbeiderpartiet)	15
Conservative Party (Høyre)	6
Christian Democratic Party (Kristelig Folkeparti)	2
Farmers' Party (Bondepartiet)	1
Liberal Party (Venstre)	5
Total number of members:	29

Steinkjer bystyre 1951–1955
Party name (in Norwegian)	Number of representatives
Labour Party (Arbeiderpartiet)	14
Conservative Party (Høyre)	6
Christian Democratic Party (Kristelig Folkeparti)	2
Liberal Party (Venstre)	6
Total number of members:	28

Steinkjer bystyre 1947–1951
Party name (in Norwegian)	Number of representatives
Labour Party (Arbeiderpartiet)	10
Christian Democratic Party (Kristelig Folkeparti)	1
Liberal Party (Venstre)	5
Joint List(s) of Non-Socialist Parties (Borgerlige Felleslister)	4
Total number of members:	20

Steinkjer bystyre 1945–1947
Party name (in Norwegian)	Number of representatives
Labour Party (Arbeiderpartiet)	10
Christian Democratic Party (Kristelig Folkeparti)	2
Liberal Party (Venstre)	4
Joint List(s) of Non-Socialist Parties (Borgerlige Felleslister)	4
Total number of members:	20

Steinkjer bystyre 1937–1941*
Party name (in Norwegian)	Number of representatives
Labour Party (Arbeiderpartiet)	9
Liberal Party (Venstre)	7
Joint List(s) of Non-Socialist Parties (Borgerlige Felleslister)	4
Total number of members:	20
Note: Due to the German occupation of Norway during World War II, no elections were held for new municipal councils until after the war ended in 1945.

Steinkjer bystyre 1934–1937
Party name (in Norwegian)	Number of representatives
Labour Party (Arbeiderpartiet)	9
Liberal Party (Venstre)	6
Joint List(s) of Non-Socialist Parties (Borgerlige Felleslister)	5
Total number of members:	20

=== Mayors ===
The mayor (Norwegian: ordfører) of Steinkjer Municipality is the political leader of the municipality and the chairperson of the municipal council. Here is a list of people who have held this position:

- 1858–1860: Johan Fredrik Jenssen
- 1861–1863: Sivert Malmo
- 1864–1867: Adolf Volqvartz Schrøder
- 1868–1874: Georg Christian Andersen
- 1875–1877: Nils Jacob Laache
- 1878–1879: Johan Wilhelm Klüver
- 1880–1881: Nicolay Martens
- 1882–1882: Claus Urbye
- 1883–1885: Nicolay Martens (V)
- 1886–1886: Johannes Rognaas (V)
- 1887–1890: Nicolay Martens (V/MV)
- 1891–1893: Mikael Andresen Elstad (V)
- 1894–1895: Eigil Steen (H)
- 1896–1897: Ole H. Grindberg (H)
- 1898–1901: Eigil Steen (H)
- 1902–1903: Andreas S. Oksvold (V)
- 1904–1904: Lars Solem (H)
- 1905–1905: Mikael Andresen Elstad (MV)
- 1906–1906: Tøger Hagemann (V)
- 1907–1907: Carl Julius Norstrøm
- 1908–1908: Lars Bach (V)
- 1909–1913: Asmund Schiefloe (V)
- 1914–1916: Amund Wendelbo (V)
- 1917–1917: Asmund Schiefloe (V)
- 1918–1918: Kristian Bragstad (H)
- 1919–1920: Amund Wendelbo (V)
- 1920–1921: Kristian Hegstad (V)
- 1921–1924: Rolf Hanssen (H)
- 1925–1927: Gustav R. Strugstad (V)
- 1928–1930: Adolf Ribsskog (V)
- 1931–1936: Andreas Strand (V)
- 1937–1939: Olav Hougen (V)
- 1939–1941: Arne Gausen (V)
- 1942–1945: Christian Bruseth (NS)
- 1945–1945: Arne Gausen (V)
- 1946–1951: Alf Sjursen (Ap)
- 1952–1963: Åmunn Solberg (Ap)
- 1964–1967: Karl Dahl (Ap)
- 1968–1973: Knut Aas (Sp)
- 1974–1981: Bård Rannem (Sp)
- 1982–1989: Erik Bartnes (Sp)
- 1990–1991: Erling Aune (Ap)
- 1992–1999: Kristian Wibe (Sp)|date=2023-09-12
- 1999–2007: Per Sverre Rannem (Ap)
- 2007–2019: Bjørn Arild Gram (Sp)
- 2019–2023: Anne Berit Lein (Sp)
- 2023–present: Gunnar Thorsen (Ap)

== Geography ==
Steinkjer Municipality is located at the head of Beitstadfjorden, the northern branch of the Trondheimsfjord system. To the west, the municipality borders Åfjord Municipality and to the northwest, it borders Namsos Municipality. Overhalla Municipality lies to the north. Snåsa Municipality lies to the northeast. The easternmost point in Steinkjer Municipality lies just 13 kilometres (8.1 mi) from the border with Sweden. Verdal Municipality is located to the southeast. Indre Fosen Municipality and Inderøy Municipality both lie to the south of Steinkjer Municipality.

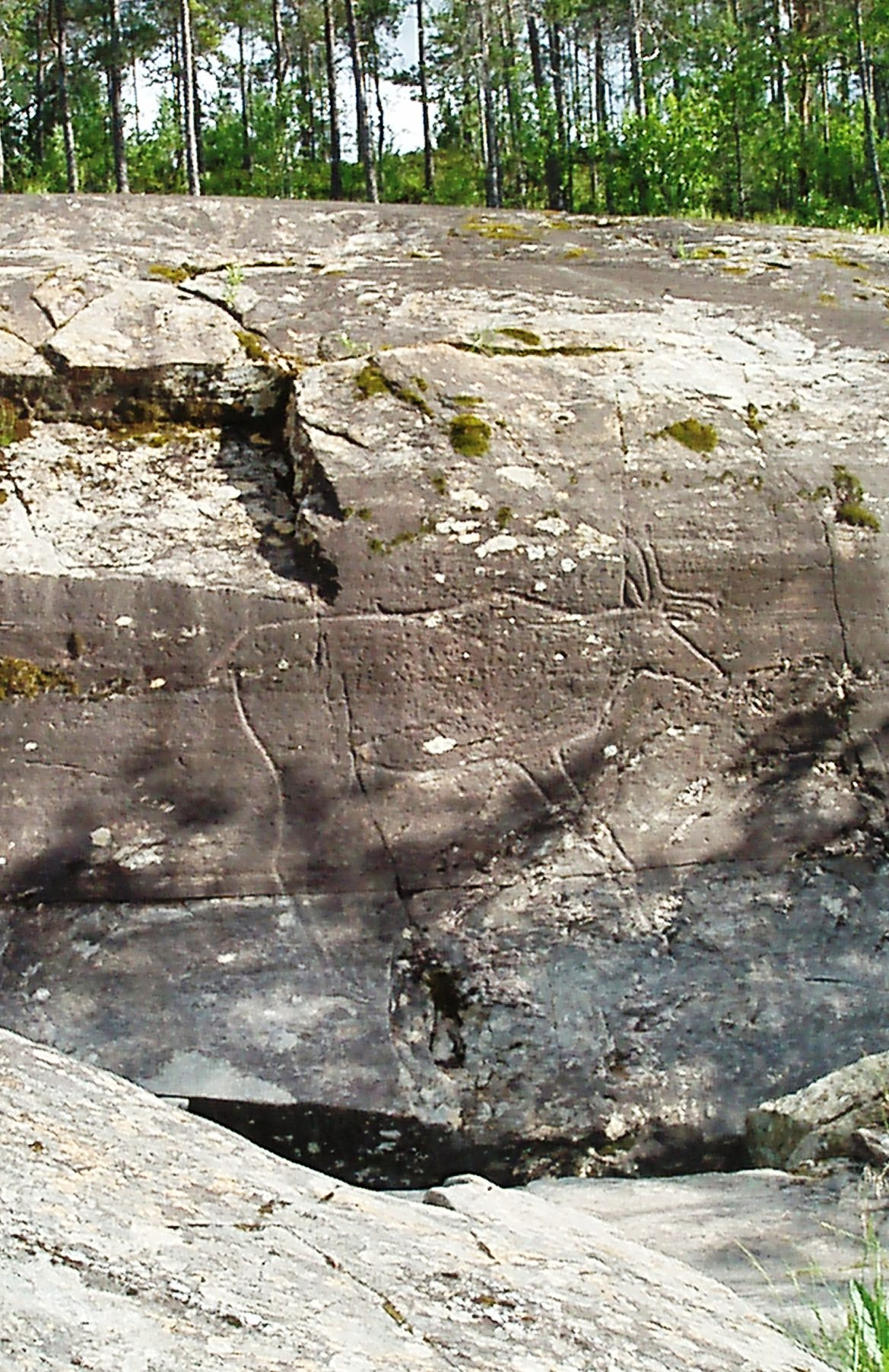
Bølareinen rock carving from the Stone Age

Situated 60 kilometres (37 mi) inland from the coast, Steinkjer is actually still connected to the Atlantic ocean through the narrow strait of Skarnsundet, some 25 kilometres (16 mi) south of Steinkjer. The longest cable-stayed bridge in Norway, Skarnsund Bridge, crosses the Skarnsund (total length of 1,010 metres or 3,310 feet). Large ships pass through Skarnsundet and this allows tourists to visit this town by ship. Each year ferries from Hurtigruten make trips to the cruise port of Steinkjer, more than 130 kilometres (81 mi) of travel through the fjord system. The landscape is dotted with wavy hills and dense spruce forests, as well as agricultural fields in the lowland areas. There are many lakes in this region including: Gilten, Fossemvatnet, Leksdalsvatnet, Mokkavatnet, Snåsavatnet, and the group of lakes called Bangsjøene. The highest point in the municipality is the 818.64-metre (2,685.8 ft) tall mountain Brannheiklumpen.

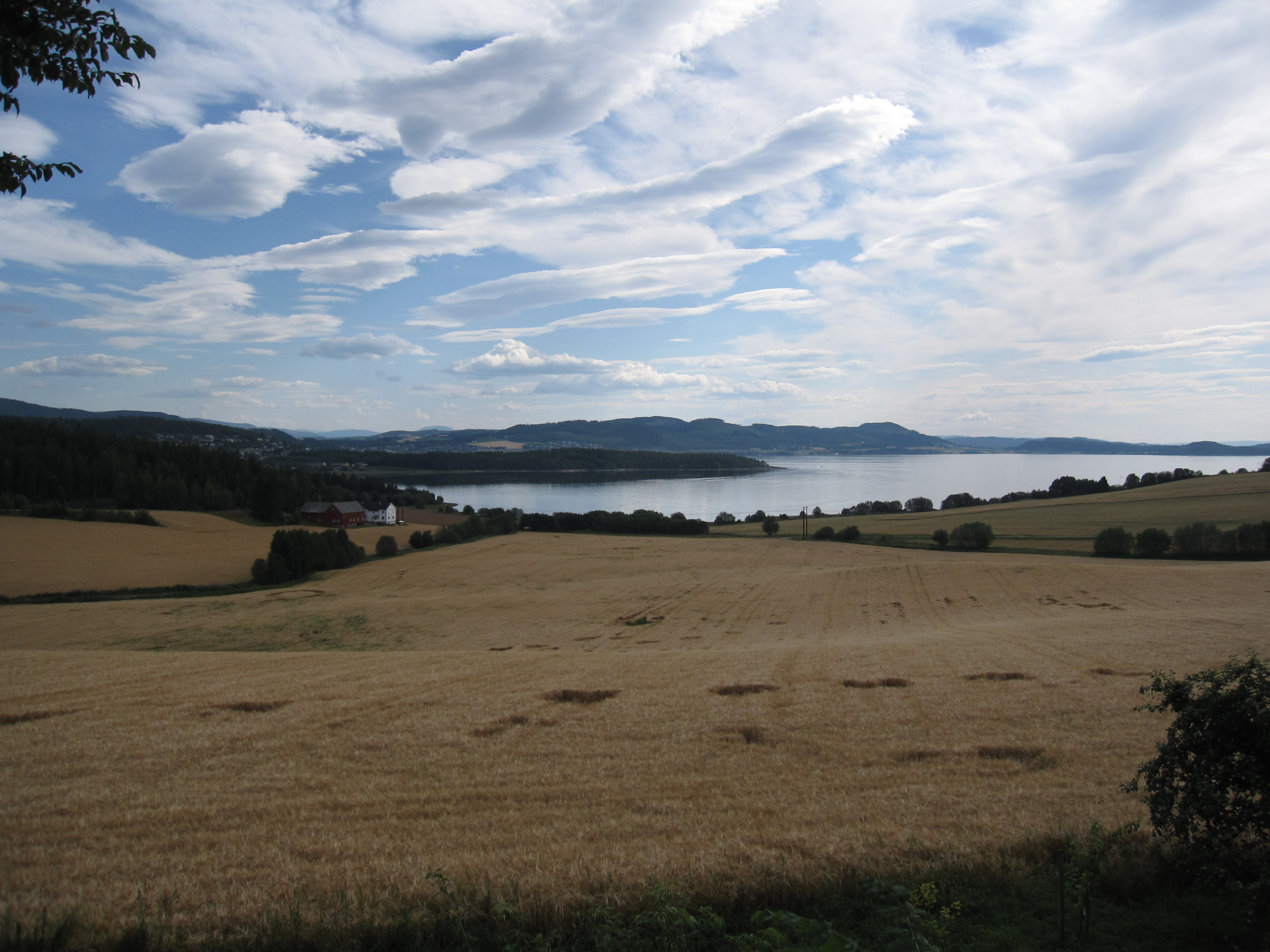
The municipality covers large areas outside the town itself, much of it farmland or productive forest. View towards the Beitstadfjorden.

=== Natural resources ===
Steinkjer is one of Norway's larger urban municipalities measured by total area. Approximately half the population lives near the town center, while the rest live in rural areas. However, much of the town is today in the process of urbanization, with the building of several apartment blocks in or within the immediate vicinity of the town. Currently, about 500 apartments are being finished.

Steinkjer is one of the northernmost areas with rich agriculture, allowing large production of grain. It is obvious from the landscape that Steinkjer is a typical agricultural municipality. In addition, there are large forest resources in the immediate area. The tallest buildings in Steinkjer are two 40-metre (130 ft) tall grain silos, visible several kilometres south of Steinkjer and today mark the skyline, especially when viewed from the south. Kirknesvaag Sag & Høvleri is a large wood mill and industry park producing wood planks and treehouse module components. Almost half of the inner town area consists of the large industrial park for wood products. Most of the ship traffic is related to transportation of the vast forest resources present in Nord-Trøndelag such as timber and cellulose. An important tree species is Norway Spruce.

=== Climate ===
Steinkjer has a Humid continental climate, but with some oceanic features, such as relatively mild winters, and a winter month (December) being the wettest. Steinkjer has a relatively sheltered location, and is often the warmest town in summer in Trøndelag. In July 2014, the weather station at Mære in Steinkjer recorded monthly mean temperature 20 °C (68 °F) and average daily high 27.2 °C (81.0 °F), the warmest month recorded in Trøndelag. Further north from Steinkjer, geographical distances between cities grow. The climate of Steinkjer marks a border with the colder conditions typical of inland areas further north. The all-time high 33.7 °C (92.7 °F) was recorded 17 July 2025, and the record low −25.4 °C (−13.7 °F) on 6 January 2010.

Climate data for Steinkjer 1991-2020 (6 m, Søndre Egge, extremes 1992-2025)
Month	Jan	Feb	Mar	Apr	May	Jun	Jul	Aug	Sep	Oct	Nov	Dec	Year
Record high °C (°F)	9.6 (49.3)	10.9 (51.6)	13.9 (57.0)	21.7 (71.1)	30.2 (86.4)	32.8 (91.0)	33.7 (92.7)	31 (88)	25.5 (77.9)	20.8 (69.4)	13.4 (56.1)	11.5 (52.7)	33.7 (92.7)
Mean daily maximum °C (°F)	0.6 (33.1)	1 (34)	4 (39)	9 (48)	14 (57)	17.6 (63.7)	20.7 (69.3)	19.7 (67.5)	14.9 (58.8)	8.6 (47.5)	3.4 (38.1)	1.3 (34.3)	9.6 (49.2)
Daily mean °C (°F)	−2.2 (28.0)	−2.3 (27.9)	0.1 (32.2)	4.3 (39.7)	8.8 (47.8)	12.5 (54.5)	15.2 (59.4)	14.5 (58.1)	10.5 (50.9)	5 (41)	1 (34)	−1.4 (29.5)	5.5 (41.9)
Mean daily minimum °C (°F)	−5.2 (22.6)	−5.3 (22.5)	−3.5 (25.7)	0.3 (32.5)	4.2 (39.6)	8.1 (46.6)	10.6 (51.1)	10.1 (50.2)	6.7 (44.1)	2.1 (35.8)	−2 (28)	−4.5 (23.9)	1.8 (35.2)
Record low °C (°F)	−25.4 (−13.7)	−24.2 (−11.6)	−20.6 (−5.1)	−11.3 (11.7)	−3.9 (25.0)	−1.7 (28.9)	2.6 (36.7)	0 (32)	−3.3 (26.1)	−9.2 (15.4)	−18.2 (−0.8)	−22.4 (−8.3)	−25.4 (−13.7)
Average precipitation mm (inches)	86 (3.4)	60 (2.4)	75 (3.0)	53 (2.1)	47 (1.9)	58 (2.3)	68 (2.7)	75 (3.0)	81 (3.2)	86 (3.4)	78 (3.1)	96 (3.8)	863 (34.3)
Source 1: Norwegian Meteorological Institute
Source 2: Noaa WMO averages 91-2020 Norway

=== Birdlife ===
Steinkjer, with its varied habitats, provides the local birdlife with some of the best localities within the region. One of these is Lake Lømsen with its breeding population of Slavonian grebe. The surrounding woodlands and farmlands hold a host of the commoner Scandinavian species, some, like fieldfare and redwing, can be found in good numbers.

=== Forests and other habitats ===
The municipality of Steinkjer includes lowland forests, alpine forests, as well as areas above the treeline. A part of Blåfjella-Skjækerfjella National Park is located in the municipality. Byahalla, the most northerly deciduous temperate forest (hemiboreal) location in the world, with species such as wych elm, hazel, hepatica, hedge woundwort, and garlic mustard, is located in Steinkjer, probably due to the sheltered south facing location and the good soil resulting from marine deposits. Some moist locations with spruce forests are classified as boreal rainforests and are part of the Scandinavian coastal conifer forests. The shallow river estuaries in the inner part of the Trondheimsfjord have some of the richest bird life in Norway; thousands of migratory birds feed here. Part of Snåsavatnet, the 6th largest lake in Norway, is located in the municipality, and the river from the lake meets the fjord in the town of Steinkjer.

== Transportation ==
Steinkjer lies about 120 kilometres (75 mi) by road north of the city of Trondheim along the European route E6 highway. The Sneppen Bridge is part of the E6 in the town of Steinkjer, crossing Steinkjerelva river. Norwegian County Road 17 begins in Steinkjer and heads north. This highway is often referred to as the Coastal highway, whereas the E6 runs further inland to the north.

Steinkjer is the home of the oldest network arch bridge in the world opened to traffic 1964. The bridge is 94 m long and takes the Nedre Mølleveg over Steinkjerelva river.

The municipality is situated along the Nordland Line from Trondheim, and is served by Steinkjer Station and Sparbu Station.

== Culture ==
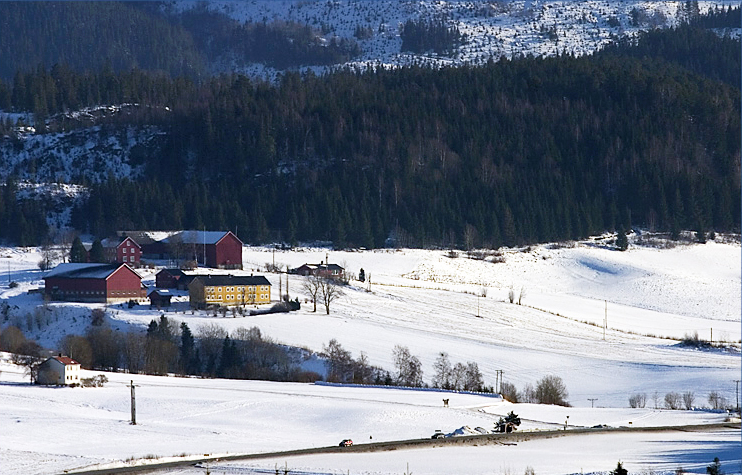

Steinkjer also has a rich culture and hosts one of the most prominent music cultures in central Norway. Steinkjer is also labeled "Steinkjer Punkrock town" by some of its citizens. The music festival Steinkjerfestivalen was established in 2006. Steinkjermartnan, held each year in August, is a happening where trading booths are staged in the town centre's streets and a traditional trade festival with concerts are held.

Steinkjer has the standard cultural facilities like a cinema, town library, culture house (in which many cultural events and concerts are held), and a modern swimming pool called Dampsaga Bad. The swimming pool has a 25-metre (82 ft) long training pool plus heating pools, sauna, two learning pools for kids, and a large swim tube.

The regional newspaper Trønder-Avisa is published in Steinkjer. There area also two local newspapers: Steinkjer-Avisa and Steinkjer24.

=== Education ===
Steinkjer houses the administration and Faculty of Society, Commerce, and Nature of Nord-Trøndelag University College. Important studies include the School of Forestry (Norwegian: Skogskolen). Historically, Steinkjer has produced a higher than average amount of university students. Only 25% of the students return to Steinkjer. Steinkjer is therefore a municipality that produces many people with higher education students. In Norwegian, municipalities such as Steinkjer that produce many people with higher education who leave the municipality are known as oppvekstkommuner (lit. 'upbringing municipalities').

== Notable people ==
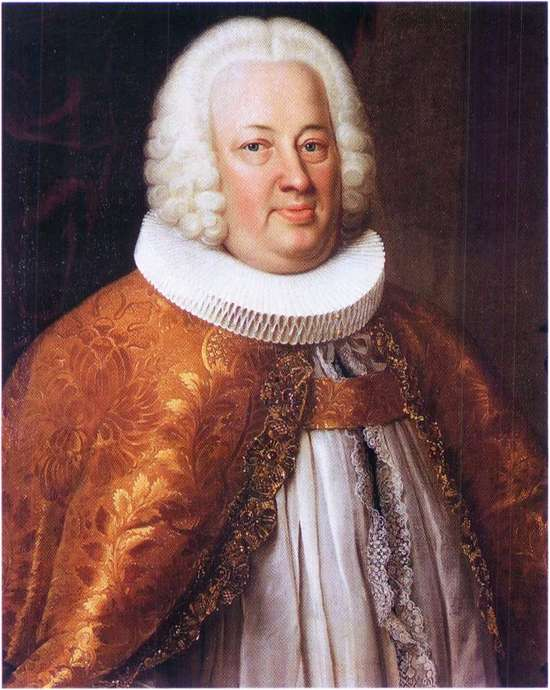
Peder Hersleb, 1757

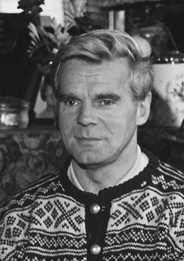
Jakob Weidemann, 1966

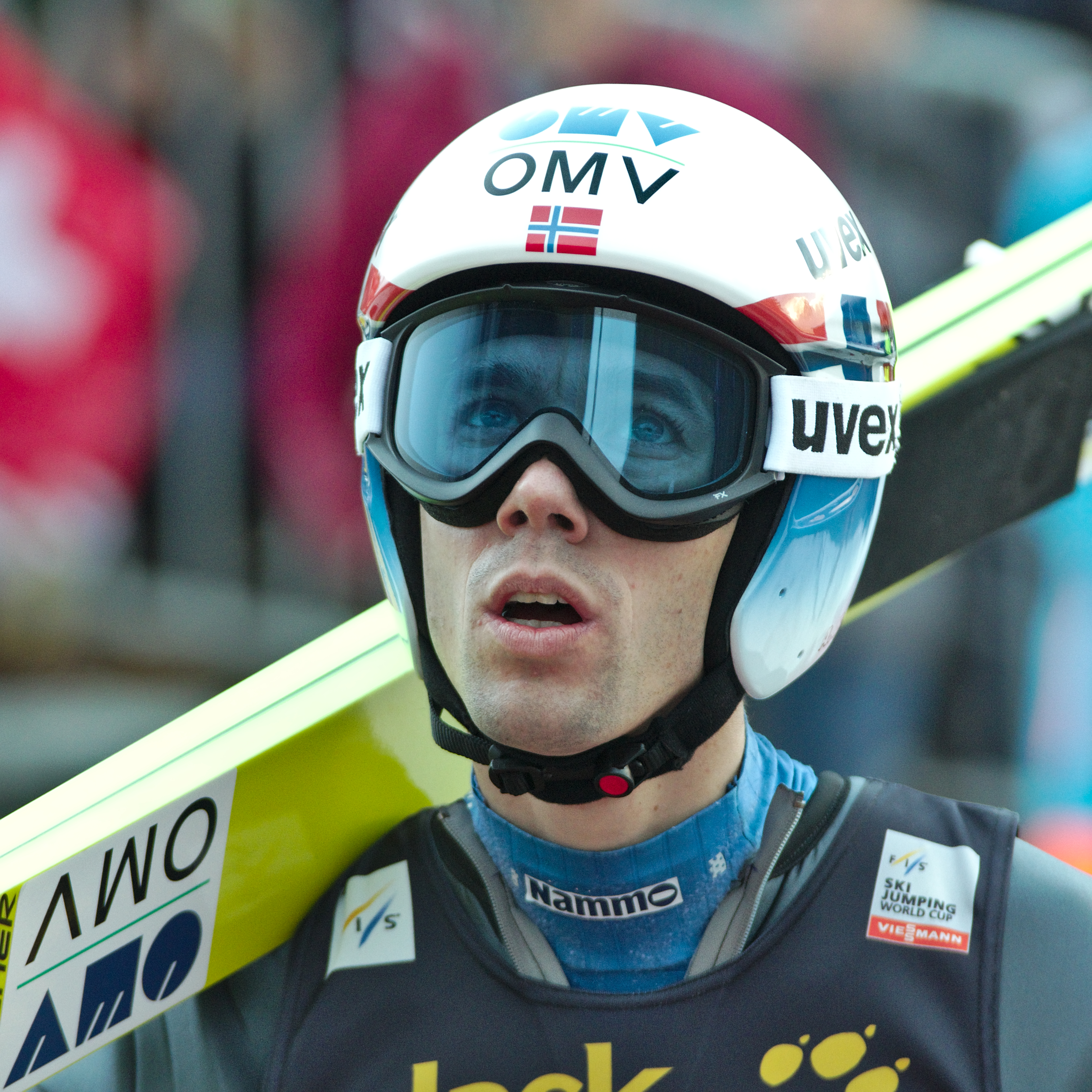
Anders Bardal, 2014

=== Public service ===
- Peder Hersleb (1689 in Steinkjer – 1757), a Norwegian-Danish clergyman and Bishop of Oslo and Bishop of Zealand
- Fredrikke Marie Qvam (1843–193), a humanitarian leader, feminist, liberal politician, and wife of Prime Minister Ole Anton Qvam; lived in the manor Helge-By-Rein in Steinkjer from 1849
- Ole Olsen Five (1846 in Stod – 1930), a Norwegian teacher and politician
- Otto Sverdrup (1854–1930), a sailor and Arctic explorer who moved to Steinkjer in 1877
- Ivar Asbjørn Følling (1888 at Kvam – 1973), a physician and biochemist who wrote first scientific description of Følling's disease Phenylketonuria
- Gustav Aarestrup (1916 in Steinkjer – 2005), a jurist, businessperson, and CEO of Storebrand
- Erling Selvig (born 1931 in Egge), a Norwegian legal scholar and judge
- I. H. Monrad Aas (born 1948 in Steinkjer), a public health researcher and odontologist
- Olaug Svarva (born 1957 in Steinkjer), a financial analyst and former CEO of the Government Pension Fund – Norway
- Bjørn Arild Gram (born 1972 in Steinkjer), a Norwegian politician and Mayor of Steinkjer in 2007

=== Arts ===
- Emil Knudsen (1872 in Steinkjer – 1956), a psychic
- Jakob Weidemann (1923 in Steinkjer – 2001), an Abstract expressionism artist
- John Pål Inderberg (born 1950 in Steinkjer), a versatile jazz saxophonist
- Silje Nergaard (born 1966 in Steinkjer), a Norwegian jazz vocalist and songwriter
- Øyvind Brandtsegg (born 1971 in Steinkjer), a jazz musician who plays percussion and electronica
- Stian Westerhus (born 1979 in Jådåren), a Norwegian experimental style guitarist
- Ida Jenshus (born 1987 in Steinkjer), a country music singer

=== Sports ===
- Kristian Fjerdingen (1884 in Steinkjer – 1975), a gymnast and team gold medallist at the 1906 Summer Olympics
- Carl Klæth (1887 in Steinkjer – 1966) & John Skrataas (1890 in Egge – 1961), gymnasts who were team silver medallists at the 1908 Summer Olympics
- Gunnar Dybwad (1928 in Steinkjer – 2012), a footballer with 27 caps for Norway
- Terje Langli (born 1965 in Steinkjer), a cross-country skier, bronze and gold team medallist at the 1992 Winter Olympics, as well as world champion
- Anders Bardal (born 1982 in Steinkjer), a ski jumper who was twice bronze medallist in the 2010 and 2014 Winter Olympics, as well as 2013 World Champion
- Rune Ertsås (born 1987 in Steinkjer), a retired footballer with over 270 club caps
- Bendik Bye (born 1990 in Steinkjer), a Norwegian footballer with over 340 club caps
- Rolf Nordmo (1967-) vet, murder of Janne Puhakka(famous icehockey player, only 29years old)
