= Sunnan =

Village in Steinkjer Municipality, Norway

Sundan Sunnan
- Village
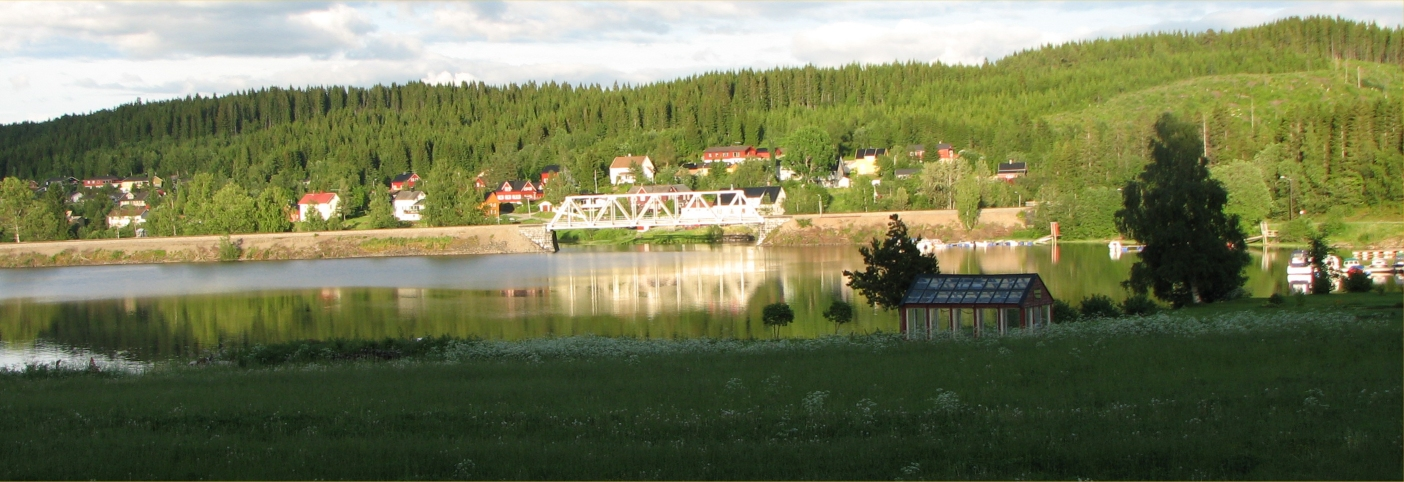
- View of the village
- Interactive map of Sundan; Sunnan
- Location within Trøndelag Location within Norway
- Coordinates: 64.0787°N 11.6286°E
- Country: Norway
- Region: Central Norway
- County: Trøndelag
- District: Innherred
- Municipality: Steinkjer Municipality

Area
  - Total: 0.29 km^{2} (0.11 sq mi)
- Elevation: 36 m (118 ft)

Population (2003)
  - Total: 233
  - Density: 803/km^{2} (2,080/sq mi)
- Time zone: UTC+01:00 (CET)
  - Summer (DST): UTC+02:00 (CEST)
- Postal code: 7717 Steinkjer

Sunnan or Sundan is a village in Steinkjer Municipality in Trøndelag county, Norway. It is located in the area between the lakes Snåsavatnet and Fossemvatnet about 10 kilometres (6.2 mi) northeast of the town of Steinkjer. The village of Følling lies about 4 kilometres (2.5 mi) to the west and the village of Binde lies about 4 kilometres (2.5 mi) to the east.

The 0.29-square-kilometre (72-acre) village had a population (2003) of 233 and a population density of 803 inhabitants per square kilometre (2,080/sq mi). Since 2003, the population and area data for this village area has not been separately tracked by Statistics Norway.

Sunnan was the terminal railway station of the Hell–Sunnan Line from 1905. In 1926, the line was extended and became part of the Nordland Line.
