= Snåsavatnet =

Lake in Snåsa and Steinkjer, Trøndelag, Norway

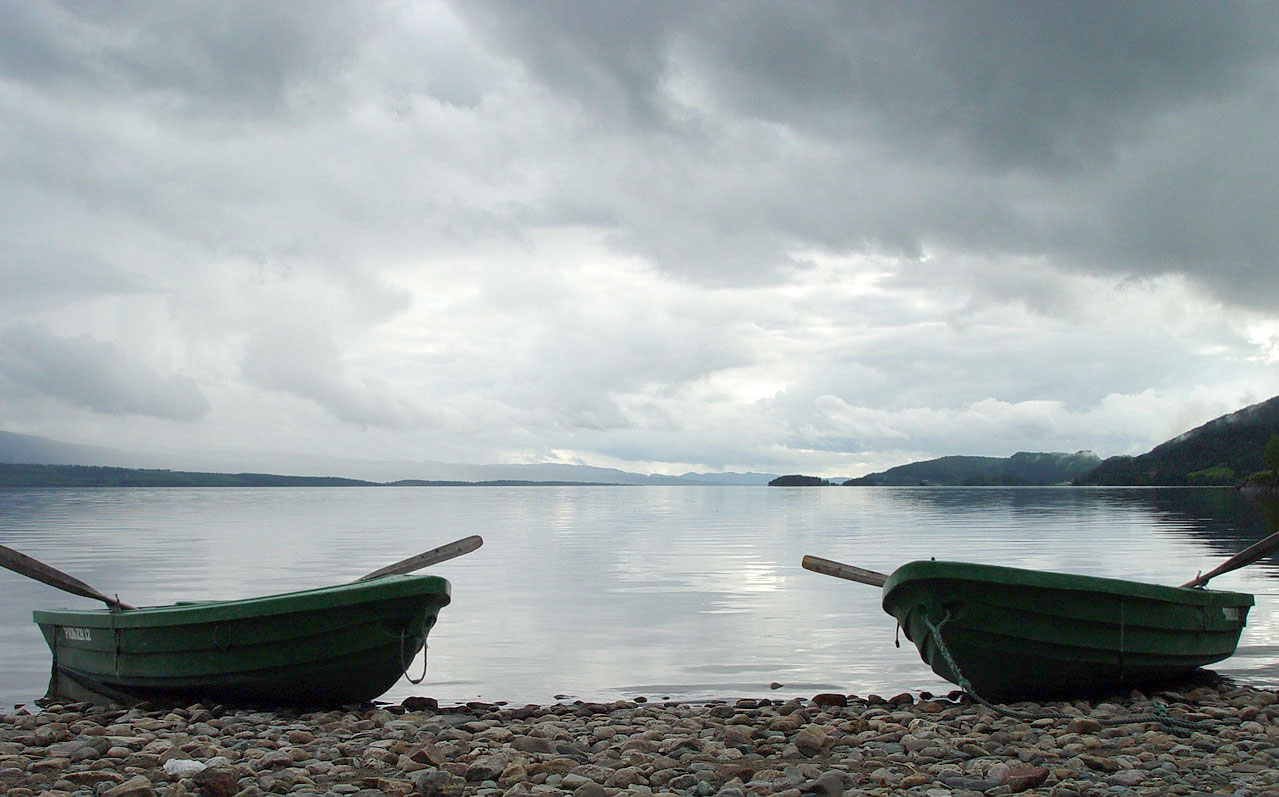
- Interactive map of the lake
- Location: Steinkjer Municipality and Snåsa Municipality, Trøndelag
- Coordinates: 64.1874°N 12.0249°E
- Type: glacier fjord lake
- Primary outflows: Byaelva
- Catchment area: 1,434.24 km^{2} (553.76 sq mi)
- Basin countries: Norway
- Max. length: 40 km (25 mi)
- Max. width: 5 km (3.1 mi)
- Surface area: 125.73 km^{2} (48.54 sq mi)
- Average depth: 46 m (151 ft)
- Max. depth: 186 m (610 ft)
- Water volume: 5.78 km^{3} (1.39 cu mi)
- Surface elevation: 22 m (72 ft)
- References: NVE

Snåsavatnet (Urban East Norwegian: [ˈsnòːsɑˌvɑtnə]; English: Lake Snåsa) is Norway's sixth-largest lake. The 126-square-kilometre (49 sq mi) lake is located in Steinkjer Municipality and Snåsa Municipality in Trøndelag county, Norway. The villages of Følling and Sunnan lie at the southwestern end of the lake and the village of Snåsa lies at the northeastern end of the lake. European route E6 runs along the northern shore of the lake and the Nordland Line railway runs along the southern shore.

The lake is approximately 40 km (25 mi) long and on average about 3 km (1.9 mi) wide. The surface of the lake is only 22 m (72 ft) above sea level, and it reaches depths of up to 186 m (610 ft). Its deepest area reaches; 164 m (538 ft) below sea level. The lake was created by glacial erosion. As it is seen on a map, the lake looks like an extension of the Trondheim Fjord. The outlet is the river Byaelva, which empties into the Beitstadfjorden (an arm of the Trondheim Fjord) in the city of Steinkjer.

== See also ==
- List of lakes in Norway
