= Snåsa =

Snåsa may refer to:

== Places ==
- Snåsa Municipality, a municipality in Trøndelag county, Norway
- Snåsa (village), a village in Snåsa Municipality in Trøndelag county, Norway
- Snåsa Church, a church built in 1200 in Snåsa Municipality in Trøndelag county, Norway
- Snåsa Station, a railway station in Snåsa Municipality in Trøndelag county, Norway
- Lake Snåsa, a lake in the municipalities of Snåsa and Steinkjer in Trøndelag county, Norway
