= Øyingen =

Lake in Trøndelag, Norway

- Interactive map of the lake
- Location: Snåsa Municipality, Trøndelag
- Coordinates: 64.1957°N 12.6902°E
- Basin countries: Norway
- Max. length: 3.5 kilometres (2.2 mi)
- Max. width: 1.5 kilometres (0.93 mi)
- Surface area: 2.95 km^{2} (1.14 sq mi)
- Shore length^{1}: 18.32 kilometres (11.38 mi)
- Surface elevation: 384 metres (1,260 ft)
- References: NVE
- ^{1} Shore length is not a well-defined measure.

Øyingen is a lake in Snåsa Municipality in Trøndelag county, Norway. The 2.95-square-kilometre (1.14 sq mi) lake lies just outside the border of the Blåfjella–Skjækerfjella National Park. The lake Grøningen lies to the southeast and the lake Andorsjøen lies to the northeast.

== See also ==
- List of lakes in Norway
