= Agle (disambiguation) =

Agle is a village in Norway.

Agle may also refer to:

- Josh Agle – American artist
- Nan Agle – American author
- Travis Agle – Guitarist, member of Swamp Zombies

== See also ==
- Agle Janam Mohe Bitiya Hi Kijo
