= Gressåmoen National Park =

Former National park in Norway

Coordinates: 64.250°N 13.167°E

Gressåmoen National Park (Norwegian: Gressåmoen nasjonalpark) is a former national park which was located within Snåsa Municipality in Trøndelag county, Norway. The 182-square-kilometre (70 sq mi) Gressåmoen National Park was created in 1970 and it existed until 2004 when it was incorporated into Blåfjella–Skjækerfjella National Park.
