= Holderen =

Lake on Norway/Sweden border

- Holden
- Interactive map of the lake
- Location: Snåsa, Trøndelag and Åre, Jämtland
- Coordinates: 64.0633°N 12.8948°E
- Basin countries: Norway and Sweden
- Max. length: 7.5 kilometres (4.7 mi)
- Max. width: 2 kilometres (1.2 mi)
- Surface area: 8.27 km^{2} (3.19 sq mi) (1.83 km^{2} (0.71 sq mi) in Norway; 6.44 km^{2} (2.49 sq mi) in Sweden)
- Shore length^{1}: 29.63 kilometres (18.41 mi)
- Surface elevation: 439 metres (1,440 ft)
- References: NVE
- ^{1} Shore length is not a well-defined measure.

Holderen is a lake on the border between Sweden and Norway. The 1.83-square-kilometre (0.71 sq mi) Norwegian part is located inside Blåfjella–Skjækerfjella National Park in Snåsa Municipality in Trøndelag county and the 6.44-square-kilometre (2.49 sq mi) Swedish part is located in Åre Municipality in Jämtland County. The lake lies about 3 kilometres (2 mi) south of the lake Grøningen.

== See also ==
- List of lakes in Norway
