= Andorsjøen =

Lake in Trøndelag, Norway

Andorsjøen (Norwegian) Aantesjaevrie (Southern Sami)
- Interactive map of the lake
- Location: Snåsa Municipality, Trøndelag
- Coordinates: 64.2835°N 12.9017°E
- Basin countries: Norway
- Max. length: 3.3 kilometres (2.1 mi)
- Max. width: 2 kilometres (1.2 mi)
- Surface area: 4.25 km^{2} (1.64 sq mi)
- Shore length^{1}: 21 kilometres (13 mi)
- Surface elevation: 364 metres (1,194 ft)
- References: NVE
- ^{1} Shore length is not a well-defined measure.

Andorsjøen (Norwegian) or Aantesjaevrie (Southern Sami) is a lake in Snåsa Municipality in Trøndelag county, Norway. It lies about 25 kilometres (16 mi) east of the village of Snåsa. The Blåfjella–Skjækerfjella National Park borders the 4.25-square-kilometre (1.64 sq mi) lake to the south and east. The lake Store Øyingen lies about 10 kilometres (6.2 mi) to the southwest.

== See also ==
- List of lakes in Norway
