= Vigdis Hjulstad Belbo =

Norwegian politician (born 1955)

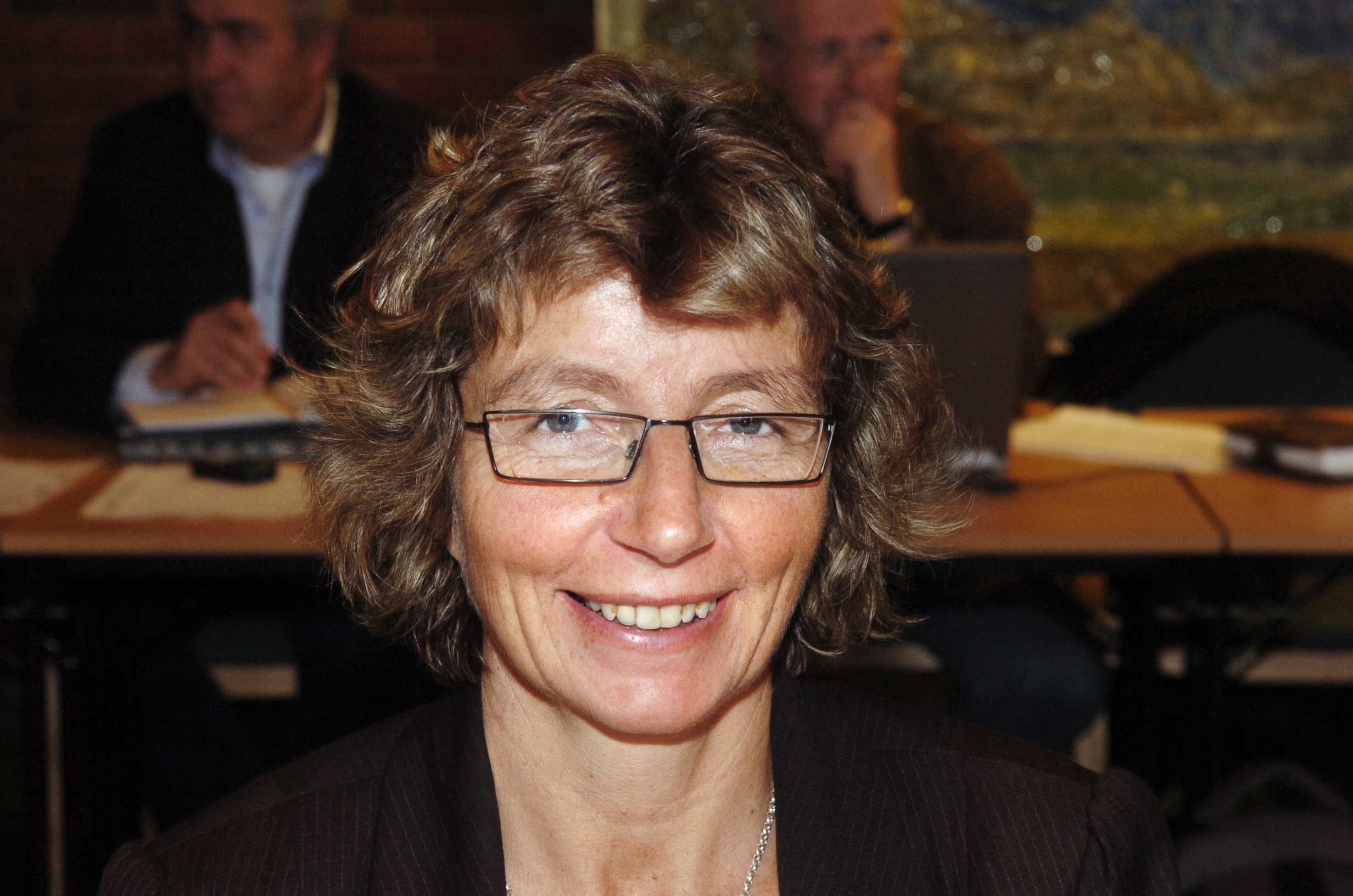
Vigdis Hjulstad Belbo

Vigdis Hjulstad Belbo (born 7 August 1955) is a Norwegian politician for the Centre Party.

She served as a deputy representative to the Norwegian Parliament from Nord-Trøndelag during the terms 1993–1997 and 1997–2001.

On the local level Belbo is the mayor of Snåsa Municipality since 2003. She was previously deputy mayor, and has chaired the county party chapter.
