= Agle =

Village in Snåsa Municipality, Norway

- Village
- Interactive map of Agle
- Location within Trøndelag Location within Norway
- Coordinates: 64.2760°N 12.5229°E
- Country: Norway
- Region: Central Norway
- County: Trøndelag
- District: Innherred
- Municipality: Snåsa Municipality
- Elevation: 170 m (560 ft)

Population
  - Total: 1,356
- Time zone: UTC+01:00 (CET)
  - Summer (DST): UTC+02:00 (CEST)
- Post Code: 7760 Snåsa

Agle is a village in Snåsa Municipality in Trøndelag county, Norway. It is located along the Nordlandsbanen railway line, about 8 kilometres (5.0 mi) north of the village of Snåsa. The mountain Andorfjellet and the lake Andorsjøen lie about 15 kilometres (9.3 mi) to the east of the village.

Agle has a montessori school, a kindergarten, and an arena for biathlon. Agle also has a community center called Bergkollen.
