= Jørstad =

Village in Snåsa Municipality, Norway

Jørstad Vestbygda / Breide
- Village
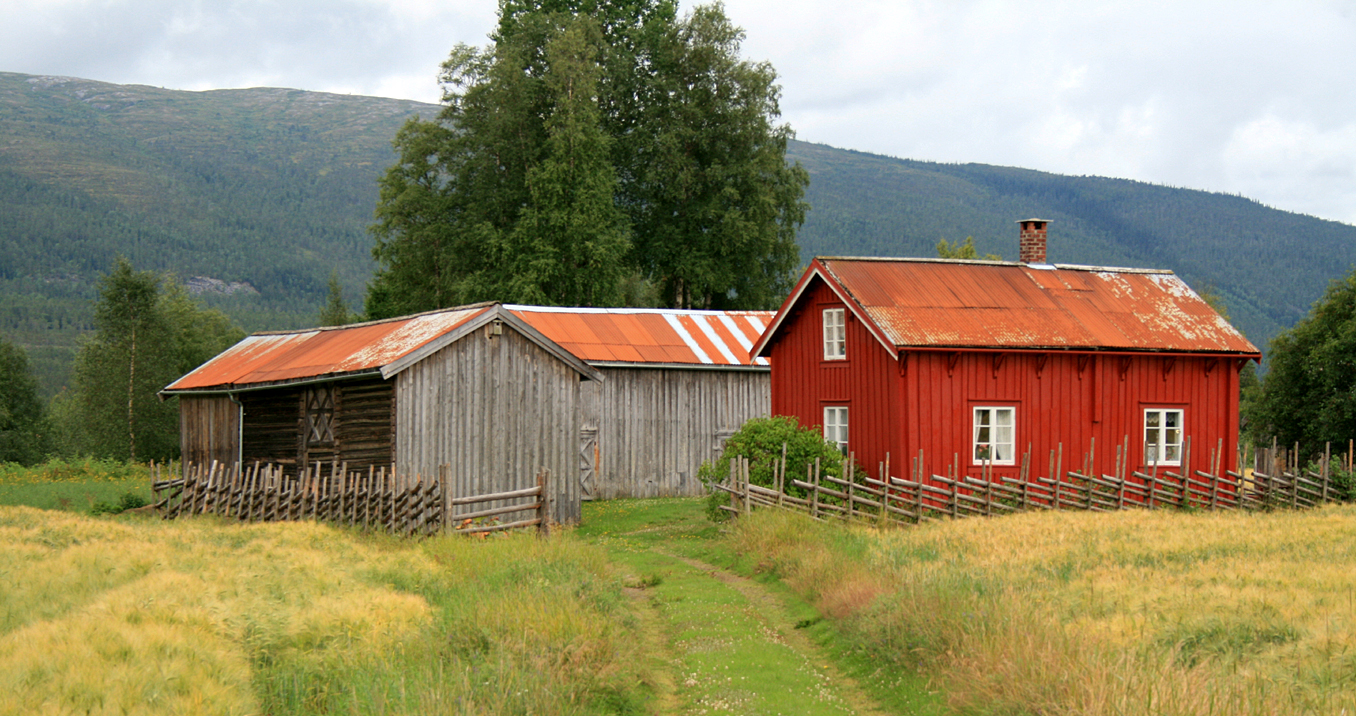
- View of the Sandmo farm in Jørstad
- Interactive map of Jørstad; Vestbygda / Breide
- Location within Trøndelag Location within Norway
- Coordinates: 64.2070°N 12.2418°E
- Country: Norway
- Region: Central Norway
- County: Trøndelag
- District: Innherred
- Municipality: Snåsa Municipality
- Elevation: 53 m (174 ft)
- Time zone: UTC+01:00 (CET)
  - Summer (DST): UTC+02:00 (CEST)
- Post Code: 7760 Snåsa

Jørstad, Vestbygda, or Breide is a village area in Snåsa Municipality in Trøndelag county, Norway. It is located on the southern coast of the lake Snåsavatnet about 10 kilometres (6.2 mi) southwest of the village of Snåsa. It is located along the Nordlandsbanen railway line which stops at the Jørstad Station. The local Sandmo farm is preserved as a museum of the historical farm life in the area. There used to be a forestry school here, but that has closed.
