= Jørstad Station =

Railway station in Jørstad, Norway

Jørstad Station Jørstad stasjon
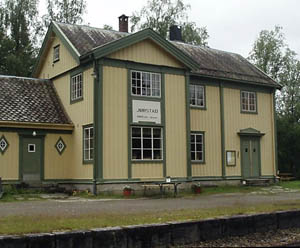
- View of the station

General information
- Location: Jørstad, Snåsa Municipality; Trøndelag; Norway
- Coordinates: 64°12′23″N 12°14′29″E
- Elevation: 52.05 metres (170.8 ft) above sea level
- System: Railway station
- Owner: Bane NOR
- Operator: SJ Norge
- Line: Nordlandsbanen
- Distance: 173.57 kilometres (107.85 mi)

History
- Opened: 30 October 1926
Location
- Location within Trøndelag Location within Norway

Jørstad Station (Norwegian: Jørstad statsjon) is a railway station in the village of Jørstad in Snåsa Municipality in Trøndelag county, Norway. The station was opened on 30 October 1926 when this section of the Nordlandsbanen railway line opened. It was originally just a small stop, but it was upgraded to a full station in 1930. In 1984, it was reduced to an unstaffed stop once again.

| Preceding station | Express trains | Following station |
|---|---|---|
| Steinkjer towards Trondheim S | F7 | Snåsa towards Bodø |
