= Grøningen =

Lake in Trøndelag, Norway

- Interactive map of the lake
- Location: Snåsa Municipality, Trøndelag
- Coordinates: 64.1340°N 12.8059°E
- Basin countries: Norway
- Max. length: 7 kilometres (4.3 mi)
- Max. width: 1 kilometre (0.62 mi)
- Surface area: 4.81 km^{2} (1.86 sq mi)
- Shore length^{1}: 24.11 kilometres (14.98 mi)
- Surface elevation: 465 metres (1,526 ft)
- References: NVE
- ^{1} Shore length is not a well-defined measure.

Grøningen is a lake in Snåsa Municipality in Trøndelag county, Norway. The 4.81-square-kilometre (1.86 sq mi) lake lies in the southeastern part of the municipality, just outside Blåfjella–Skjækerfjella National Park, about 3 kilometres (1.9 mi) north of the lake Holderen.

== See also ==
- List of lakes in Norway
