= Snåsa Station =

Railway station in Snåsa, Norway

Snåsa Station Snåsa stasjon
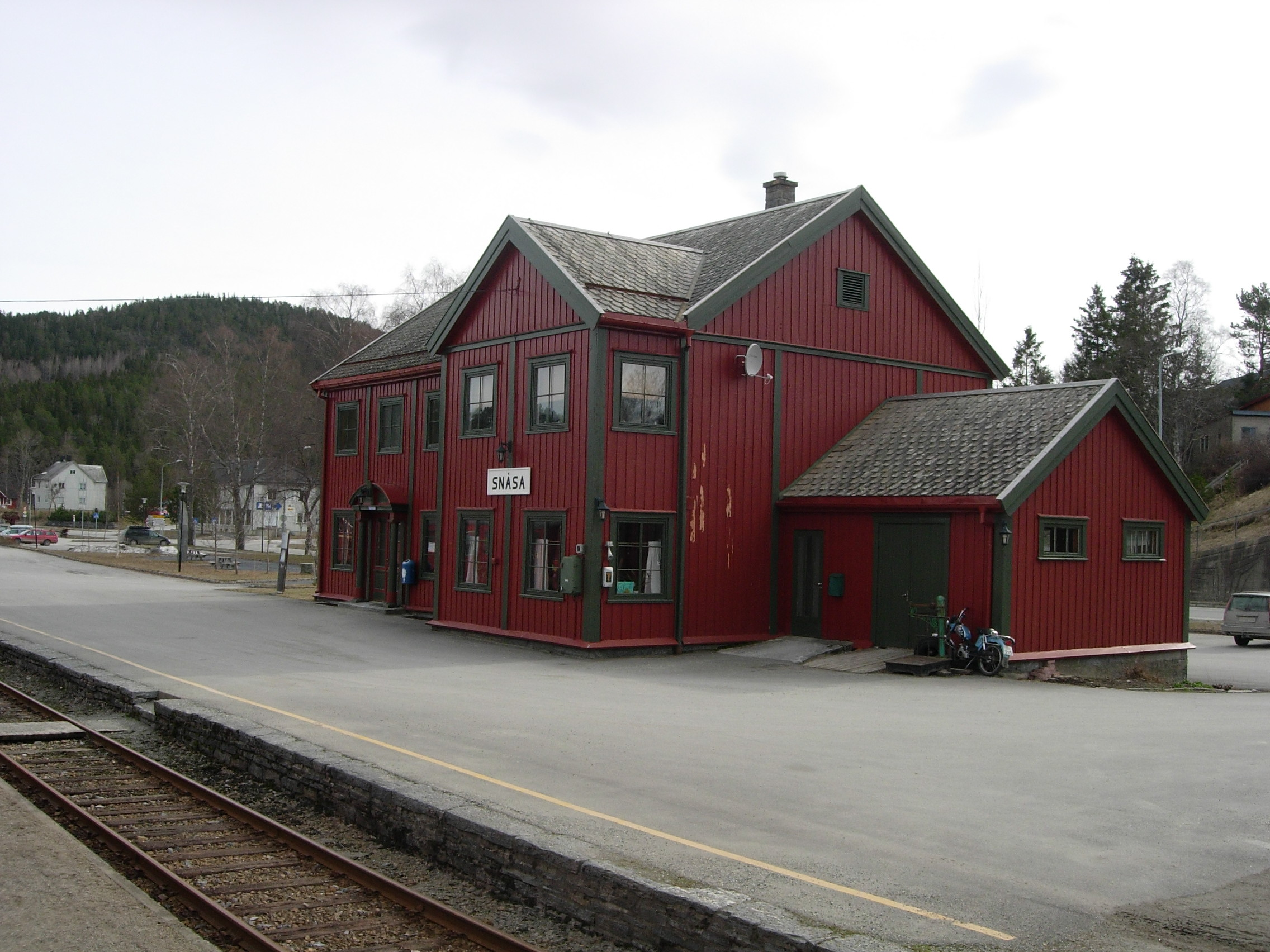
- View of the station

General information
- Location: Snåsa, Snåsa Municipality; Trøndelag; Norway
- Coordinates: 64°14′45″N 12°22′47″E
- Elevation: 70.6 metres (232 ft) above sea level
- System: Railway station
- Owner: Bane NOR
- Operator: SJ Norge
- Line: Nordlandsbanen
- Distance: 181.64 kilometres (112.87 mi)
- Connections: Bus: AtB

History
- Opened: 30 October 1926
Location
- Location within Trøndelag Location within Norway

Snåsa Station (Norwegian: Snåsa stasjon) is a railway station on the Nordland Line serving the village of Snåsa in Snåsa Municipality, Norway. It opened in 1926 when the Nordland Line was completed up to this point from Trondheim Central Station. The station has been unstaffed since 1984.

Preceding station	Express trains	Following station
Jørstad towards Trondheim S	F7	Grong towards Bodø
