= Snåsa Church =

Church in Trøndelag, Norway

- Snåsa kirke
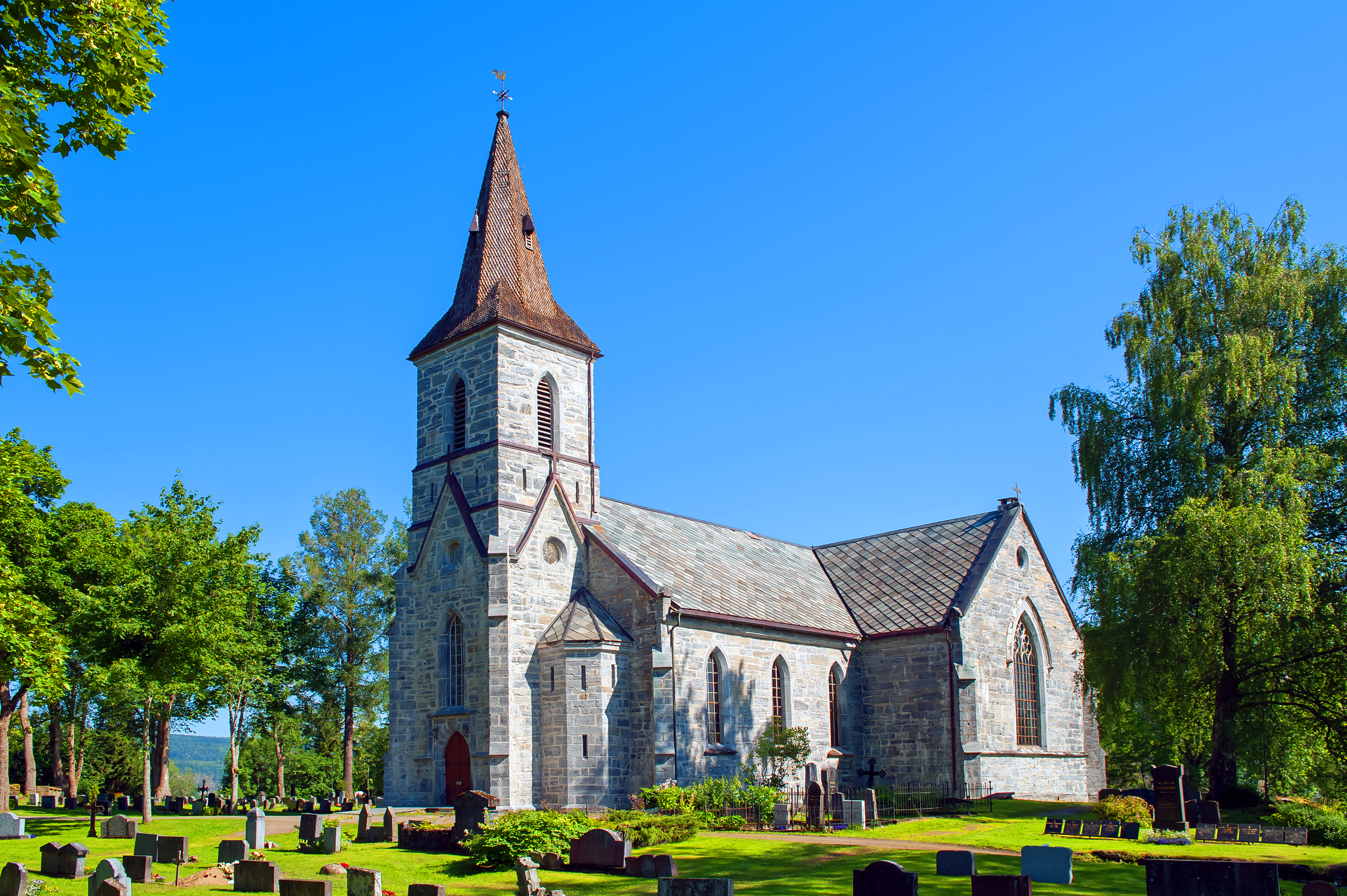
- View of the church
- Snåsa Church
- 64.24406620°N 12.37055451°E
- Location: Snåsa Municipality, Trøndelag
- Country: Norway
- Denomination: Church of Norway
- Previous denomination: Catholic Church
- Churchmanship: Evangelical Lutheran

History
- Status: Parish church
- Founded: c. 1150
- Consecrated: c. 1150

Architecture
- Functional status: Active
- Architectural type: Cruciform
- Style: Neo-Gothic
- Completed: c. 1150 (876 years ago)

Specifications
- Capacity: 500
- Materials: Stone

Administration
- Diocese: Nidaros bispedømme
- Deanery: Stiklestad prosti
- Parish: Snåsa
- Norwegian Cultural Heritage Site
- Type: Church
- Status: Automatically protected
- ID: 85507

Snåsa Church (Norwegian: Snåsa kirke) is a parish church of the Church of Norway in Snåsa Municipality in Trøndelag county, Norway. It is located in the village of Snåsa. It is the church for the Snåsa parish which is part of the Stiklestad prosti (deanery) in the Diocese of Nidaros. The stone church is built in a cruciform design. The oldest part of the church was constructed in the 12th century. The church seats about 500 people.

== History ==
The earliest existing historical records of the church date back to the year 1533, but the church was likely built much earlier than that. The stone church was originally built as a Romanesque long church during the mid-12th century, possibly around the 1150-1180. The church had a rectangular nave and a narrower, rectangular choir. The church was located at the Vinje farm, so it was historically known as the Vinje Church.

Parish priest Nils Mortenson Lund wrote in 1689 in his report that Vinje Church was burned by Swedish troops in 1612 or 1613 during the Kalmar War. The walls did not suffer much damage, so the building was repaired within two years. The wooden, baroque altarpiece is from 1677. The pulpit is composed of elements dating from the 1600s.

In 1814, this church served as an election church (Norwegian: valgkirke). Together with more than 300 other parish churches across Norway, it was a polling station for elections to the 1814 Norwegian Constituent Assembly which wrote the Constitution of Norway. This was Norway's first national elections. Each church parish was a constituency that elected people called "electors" who later met together in each county to elect the representatives for the assembly that was to meet at Eidsvoll Manor later that year.

From 1868-1870, the church was heavily remodeled and expanded. Carl Julius Bergstrøm (1828-1898) from Trondheim led the reconstruction. Two wings were built to the north and south, converting the long church design into a cruciform design. He also added many Neo-Gothic design elements into the new building.

== Media gallery ==
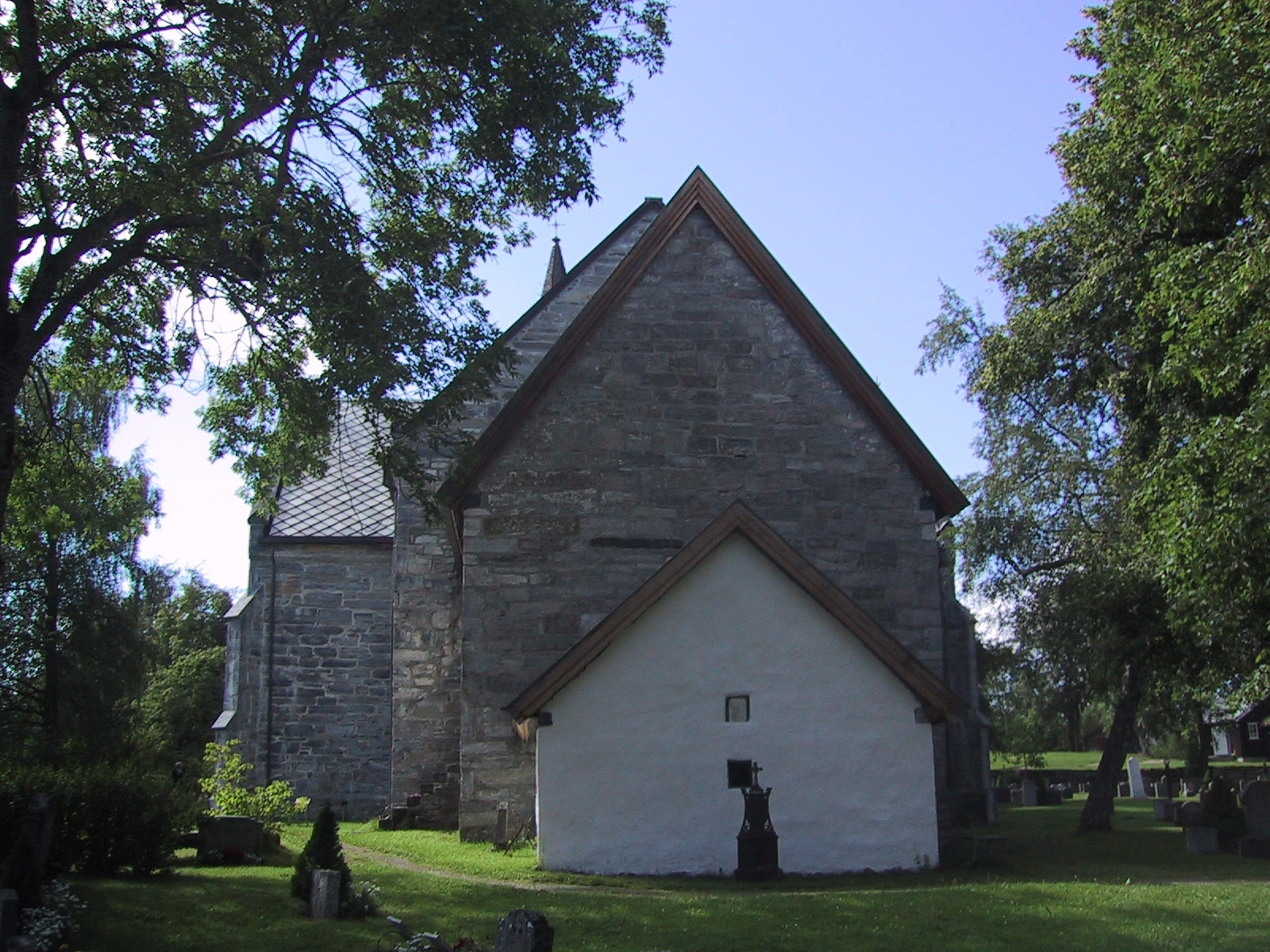
Exterior view

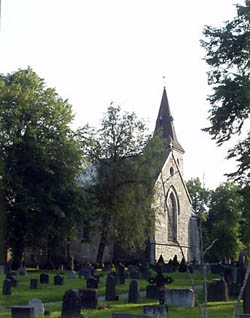
Side view

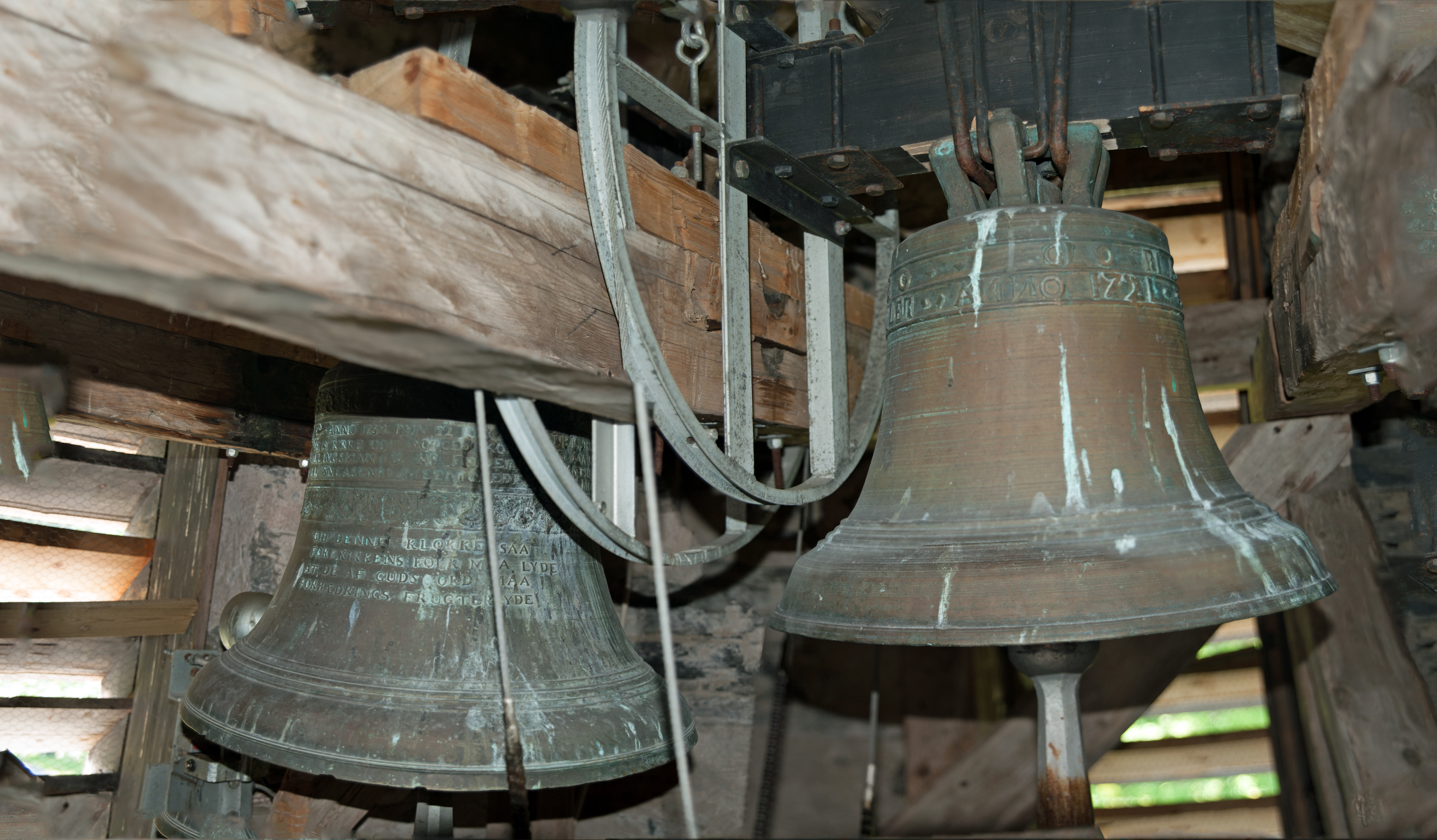
View of the bells

== See also ==
- List of churches in Nidaros
