= Snåsa Municipality =

Municipality in Trøndelag, Norway

Snåsa Municipality Snåsa kommune Snåasen tjïelte
- Municipality
- Snaasen herred (historic name)
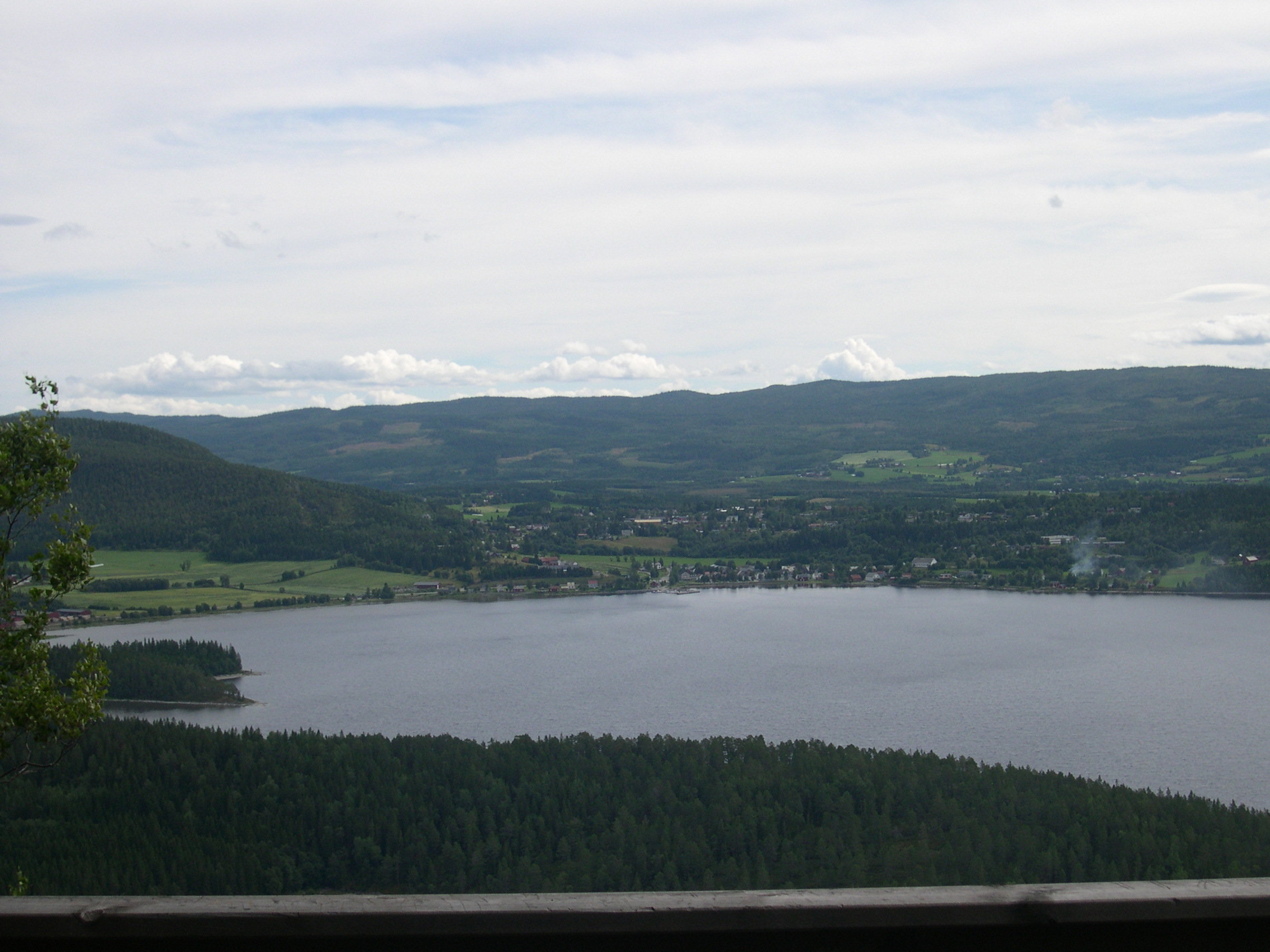
- View of Snåsa over Snåsavatnet

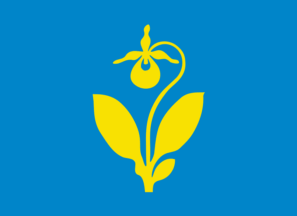
- Flag Coat of arms

- Trøndelag within Norway

- Snåsa within Trøndelag
- Coordinates: 64°13′28″N 12°37′31″E
- Country: Norway
- County: Trøndelag
- District: Innherad
- Established: 1 Jan 1838
  - Created as: Formannskapsdistrikt
- Administrative centre: Snåsa

Government
  - Mayor (2019): Arnt Einar Bardal (Sp)

Area
  - Total: 2,342.66 km^{2} (904.51 sq mi)
  - Land: 2,145.71 km^{2} (828.46 sq mi)
  - Water: 196.95 km^{2} (76.04 sq mi) 8.4%
  - Rank: #23 in Norway
- Highest elevation: 1,138.87 m (3,736.5 ft)

Population (2024)
  - Total: 2,114
  - Rank: #275 in Norway
  - Density: 0.9/km^{2} (2.3/sq mi)
  - Change (10 years): ▼ −1.9%
- Demonym: Snåsning

Official languages
  - Norwegian form: Neutral
  - Sámi form: Southern Sami
- Time zone: UTC+01:00 (CET)
  - Summer (DST): UTC+02:00 (CEST)
- ISO 3166 code: NO-5041
- Website: Official website

Snåsa (Urban East Norwegian: [ˈsnòːsɑ]) or Snåase (Southern Sami) is a municipality in Trøndelag county, Norway. It is part of the Innherred region. The administrative centre of the municipality is the village of Snåsa. Other villages include Agle and Jørstad.

The 2,343-square-kilometre (905 sq mi) municipality is the 23rd largest by area out of the 357 municipalities in Norway. Snåsa Municipality is the 275th most populous municipality in Norway with a population of 2,114 inhabitants. The municipality's population density is 0.9 inhabitants per square kilometre (2.3/sq mi) and its population has decreased by 1.9% over the previous 10-year period.

Snåsa is one of the last strongholds for the seriously endangered Southern Sami language.

== General information ==
The parish of Snåsa was established as a municipality on 1 January 1838 (see formannskapsdistrikt law). On 1 January 1874, the eastern district of Snåsa (population: 1,015) was separated to form the new Lierne Municipality. This left Snåsa Municipality with 2,235 residents. The boundaries of Snåsa Municipality have not changed since then.

On 1 January 2018, the municipality switched from the old Nord-Trøndelag county to the new Trøndelag county.

=== Name ===
The municipality (originally the parish) was named Snåsa (Old Norse: Snǫs). The name is derived from the word snǫs which means "prominent mountain" or "overhanging rock" (possibly referring to the mountain of Bergsåsen, at the inner end of the lake Snåsavatnet). Historically, the name of the municipality was spelled Snaasen. On 3 November 1917, a royal resolution changed the spelling of the name of the municipality to Snaasa. On 21 December 1917, a royal resolution enacted the 1917 Norwegian language reforms. Prior to this change, the name was spelled Snaasa with the digraph "aa", and after this reform, the name was spelled Snåsa, using the letter å instead.

On 24 September 2010, the national government approved a resolution to add a co-equal, official Southern Sami language name for the municipality: Snåase. The spelling of the Sami language name changes depending on how it is used. It is called Snåase when it is spelled alone, but it is Snåasen tjïelte when using the Sami language equivalent to "Snåsa Municipality".

=== Coat of arms ===
The coat of arms was granted on 17 March 1994. The official blazon is "Azure, a lady's-slipper orchid Or." (Norwegian: I blått en gull marisko). This means the arms have a blue field (background) and the charge is a lady's-slipper orchid (Cypripedium calceolus). The lady's-slipper orchid has a tincture of Or which means it is commonly colored yellow, but if it is made out of metal, then gold is used. The design was chosen to symbolize the prevalence of orchids growing in the municipality. This particular flower is one of at least 15 species of orchids that grow in Snåsa. The arms were designed by Even Jarl Skoglund. The municipal flag has the same design as the coat of arms.

=== Churches ===
The Church of Norway has one parish (sokn) within Snåsa Municipality. It is part of the Nord-Innherad prosti (deanery) in the Diocese of Nidaros.

Churches in Snåsa Municipality
Parish (sokn)	Church name	Location of the church	Year built
Snåsa	Snåsa Church	Snåsa	1200

=== Media ===
The weekly newspaper Snåsningen has been published in Snåsa since 1995. It has also had a section in Southern Sámi since 2009. NRK Sápmi, a Sámi-language radio station, has facilities in Snåsa.

== Geography ==
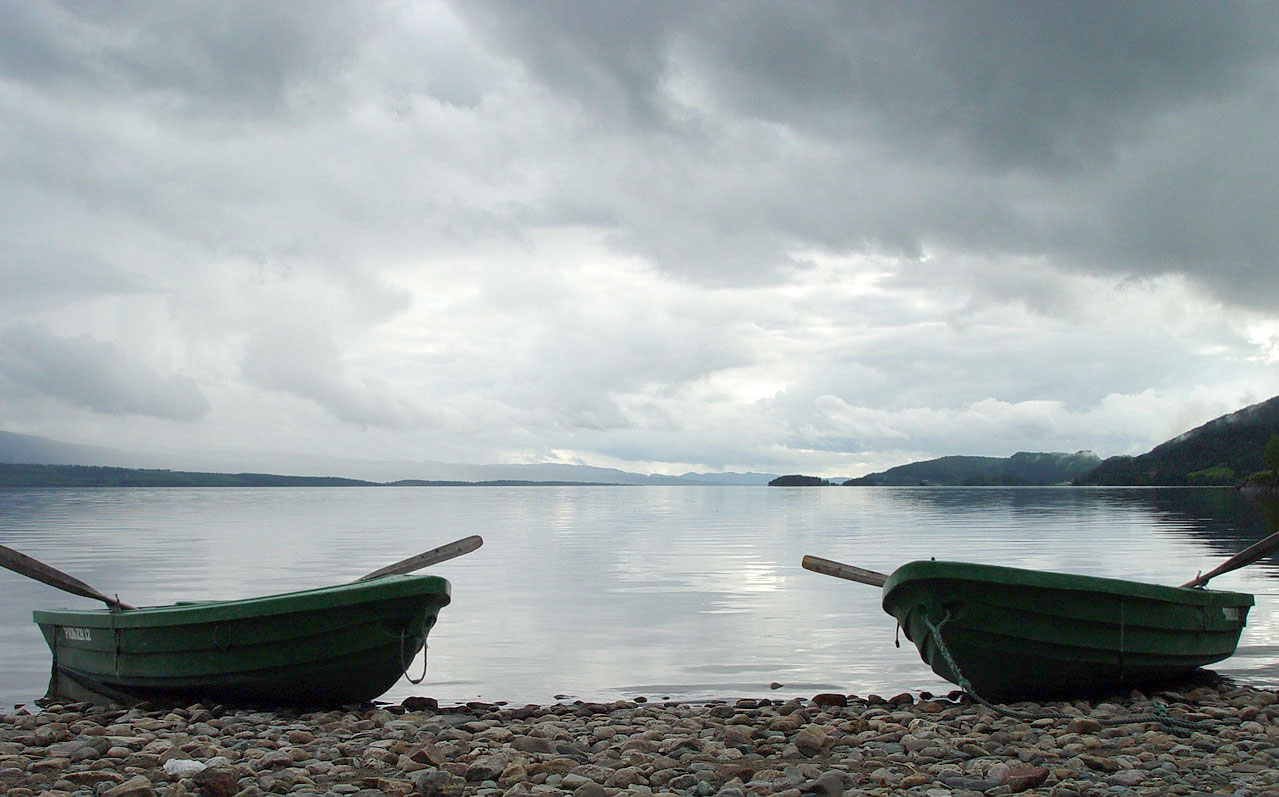
View of the lake Snåsavatnet

Snåsa is located about 180 kilometres (110 mi) northeast of the city of Trondheim, and it borders Sweden to the southeast. Snåsa Municipality borders the municipalities of Overhalla, Grong, and Lierne in the north and east, and Steinkjer and Verdal in the west and south. The 6th largest lake in the country, Snåsavatnet, is partly located in the municipality. Other lakes include Andorsjøen, Bangsjøene, Grøningen, Holderen, and Store Øyingen. The Blåfjella–Skjækerfjella National Park covers a lot of the eastern part of the municipality. The highest point in the municipality is the 1,138.87-metre (3,736.5 ft) tall mountain Skjækerhatten.

== Climate ==
The weather station Kjevlia is situated 195 meter above sea level. The part of Snåsa in the lowland, such as near Snåsa lake (22 m above sea leve) will have slightly longer and warmer summers. There are also mountain areas above the treeline, especially in Blåfjella-Skjækerfjella National Park.

Climate data for Snåsa - Kjevlia 1991-2020 (195 m)
Month	Jan	Feb	Mar	Apr	May	Jun	Jul	Aug	Sep	Oct	Nov	Dec	Year
Mean daily maximum °C (°F)	−0.6 (30.9)	−0.5 (31.1)	2.3 (36.1)	6.9 (44.4)	12.2 (54.0)	16.5 (61.7)	19.3 (66.7)	18.2 (64.8)	13.4 (56.1)	7.2 (45.0)	2.3 (36.1)	0.2 (32.4)	8.1 (46.6)
Daily mean °C (°F)	−3.7 (25.3)	−3.6 (25.5)	−1.5 (29.3)	2.7 (36.9)	7.3 (45.1)	11.4 (52.5)	14.2 (57.6)	13.1 (55.6)	9.3 (48.7)	4 (39)	−0.4 (31.3)	−2.9 (26.8)	4.2 (39.5)
Mean daily minimum °C (°F)	−7.5 (18.5)	−7.4 (18.7)	−5.8 (21.6)	−1.8 (28.8)	2.4 (36.3)	6.6 (43.9)	9.2 (48.6)	8.4 (47.1)	5.4 (41.7)	0.7 (33.3)	−3.7 (25.3)	−6.6 (20.1)	0.0 (32.0)
Average precipitation mm (inches)	99.7 (3.93)	82.7 (3.26)	85.5 (3.37)	60.7 (2.39)	58.5 (2.30)	89 (3.5)	90 (3.5)	91.8 (3.61)	109.1 (4.30)	90.2 (3.55)	85.3 (3.36)	100.5 (3.96)	1,043 (41.03)
Average precipitation days	15	14	14	11	12	14	13	15	15	15	14	15	167
Source: NOAA

== Government ==
Snåsa Municipality is responsible for primary education (through 10th grade), outpatient health services, senior citizen services, welfare and other social services, zoning, economic development, and municipal roads and utilities. The municipality is governed by a municipal council of directly elected representatives. The mayor is indirectly elected by a vote of the municipal council. The municipality is under the jurisdiction of the Trøndelag District Court and the Frostating Court of Appeal.

=== Municipal council ===
The municipal council (Kommunestyre) of Snåsa Municipality is made up of 17 representatives that are elected to four year terms. The tables below show the current and historical composition of the council by political party.

Snåsa kommunestyre 2023–2027
Party name (in Norwegian)	Number of representatives
Labour Party (Arbeiderpartiet)	5
Conservative Party (Høyre)	1
Centre Party (Senterpartiet)	9
Socialist Left Party (Sosialistisk Venstreparti)	2
Total number of members:	17

Snåsa kommunestyre 2019–2023
Party name (in Norwegian)	Number of representatives
Labour Party (Arbeiderpartiet)	6
Conservative Party (Høyre)	1
Centre Party (Senterpartiet)	8
Socialist Left Party (Sosialistisk Venstreparti)	2
Total number of members:	17

Snåsa kommunestyre 2015–2019
Party name (in Norwegian)	Number of representatives
Labour Party (Arbeiderpartiet)	10
Conservative Party (Høyre)	1
Centre Party (Senterpartiet)	7
Socialist Left Party (Sosialistisk Venstreparti)	2
Liberal Party (Venstre)	1
Total number of members:	21

Snåsa kommunestyre 2011–2015
Party name (in Norwegian)	Number of representatives
Labour Party (Arbeiderpartiet)	8
Conservative Party (Høyre)	1
Centre Party (Senterpartiet)	8
Socialist Left Party (Sosialistisk Venstreparti)	1
Liberal Party (Venstre)	3
Total number of members:	21

Snåsa kommunestyre 2007–2011
Party name (in Norwegian)	Number of representatives
Labour Party (Arbeiderpartiet)	8
Conservative Party (Høyre)	1
Centre Party (Senterpartiet)	9
Socialist Left Party (Sosialistisk Venstreparti)	1
Liberal Party (Venstre)	2
Total number of members:	21

Snåsa kommunestyre 2003–2007
Party name (in Norwegian)	Number of representatives
Labour Party (Arbeiderpartiet)	7
Progress Party (Fremskrittspartiet)	1
Conservative Party (Høyre)	1
Centre Party (Senterpartiet)	8
Socialist Left Party (Sosialistisk Venstreparti)	1
Liberal Party (Venstre)	2
Local list Snåsa (Bygdeliste Snåsa)	1
Total number of members:	21

Snåsa kommunestyre 1999–2003
Party name (in Norwegian)	Number of representatives
Labour Party (Arbeiderpartiet)	8
Conservative Party (Høyre)	1
Centre Party (Senterpartiet)	6
Socialist Left Party (Sosialistisk Venstreparti)	1
Liberal Party (Venstre)	1
Local list (Bygdeliste)	4
Total number of members:	21

Snåsa kommunestyre 1995–1999
Party name (in Norwegian)	Number of representatives
Labour Party (Arbeiderpartiet)	6
Centre Party (Senterpartiet)	10
Socialist Left Party (Sosialistisk Venstreparti)	1
Liberal Party (Venstre)	1
Local list Snåsa (Bygdeliste Snåsa)	3
Total number of members:	21

Snåsa kommunestyre 1991–1995
Party name (in Norwegian)	Number of representatives
Labour Party (Arbeiderpartiet)	6
Centre Party (Senterpartiet)	8
Socialist Left Party (Sosialistisk Venstreparti)	2
Liberal Party (Venstre)	1
Local list Snåsa (Bygdeliste Snåsa)	4
Total number of members:	21

Snåsa kommunestyre 1987–1991
Party name (in Norwegian)	Number of representatives
Labour Party (Arbeiderpartiet)	8
Conservative Party (Høyre)	2
Centre Party (Senterpartiet)	8
Socialist Left Party (Sosialistisk Venstreparti)	1
Liberal Party (Venstre)	2
Total number of members:	21

Snåsa kommunestyre 1983–1987
Party name (in Norwegian)	Number of representatives
Labour Party (Arbeiderpartiet)	7
Conservative Party (Høyre)	2
Centre Party (Senterpartiet)	8
Socialist Left Party (Sosialistisk Venstreparti)	1
Liberal Party (Venstre)	3
Total number of members:	21

Snåsa kommunestyre 1979–1983
Party name (in Norwegian)	Number of representatives
Labour Party (Arbeiderpartiet)	8
Conservative Party (Høyre)	2
Centre Party (Senterpartiet)	7
Liberal Party (Venstre)	4
Total number of members:	21

Snåsa kommunestyre 1975–1979
Party name (in Norwegian)	Number of representatives
Labour Party (Arbeiderpartiet)	8
Conservative Party (Høyre)	1
Centre Party (Senterpartiet)	10
Socialist Left Party (Sosialistisk Venstreparti)	1
Liberal Party (Venstre)	1
Total number of members:	21

Snåsa kommunestyre 1971–1975
Party name (in Norwegian)	Number of representatives
Labour Party (Arbeiderpartiet)	10
Centre Party (Senterpartiet)	9
Liberal Party (Venstre)	2
Total number of members:	21

Snåsa kommunestyre 1967–1971
Party name (in Norwegian)	Number of representatives
Labour Party (Arbeiderpartiet)	10
Conservative Party (Høyre)	1
Centre Party (Senterpartiet)	8
Liberal Party (Venstre)	2
Total number of members:	21

Snåsa kommunestyre 1963–1967
Party name (in Norwegian)	Number of representatives
Labour Party (Arbeiderpartiet)	10
Centre Party (Senterpartiet)	9
Liberal Party (Venstre)	2
Total number of members:	21

Snåsa herredsstyre 1959–1963
Party name (in Norwegian)	Number of representatives
Labour Party (Arbeiderpartiet)	10
Centre Party (Senterpartiet)	8
Liberal Party (Venstre)	3
Total number of members:	21

Snåsa herredsstyre 1955–1959
Party name (in Norwegian)	Number of representatives
Labour Party (Arbeiderpartiet)	10
Farmers' Party (Bondepartiet)	8
Liberal Party (Venstre)	3
Total number of members:	21

Snåsa herredsstyre 1951–1955
Party name (in Norwegian)	Number of representatives
Labour Party (Arbeiderpartiet)	10
Farmers' Party (Bondepartiet)	7
Liberal Party (Venstre)	3
Total number of members:	20

Snåsa herredsstyre 1947–1951
Party name (in Norwegian)	Number of representatives
Labour Party (Arbeiderpartiet)	9
Farmers' Party (Bondepartiet)	7
Liberal Party (Venstre)	4
Total number of members:	20

Snåsa herredsstyre 1945–1947
Party name (in Norwegian)	Number of representatives
Labour Party (Arbeiderpartiet)	10
Farmers' Party (Bondepartiet)	4
Liberal Party (Venstre)	6
Total number of members:	20

Snåsa herredsstyre 1937–1941*
Party name (in Norwegian)	Number of representatives
Labour Party (Arbeiderpartiet)	8
Farmers' Party (Bondepartiet)	7
Liberal Party (Venstre)	4
Local List(s) (Lokale lister)	1
Total number of members:	20
Note: Due to the German occupation of Norway during World War II, no elections were held for new municipal councils until after the war ended in 1945.

=== Mayors ===
The mayor (Norwegian: ordfører) of Snåsa Municipality is the political leader of the municipality and the chairperson of the municipal council. Here is a list of people who have held this position:

- 1838–1839: Jens Rynning
- 1840–1843: Pål Olsen Gran
- 1844–1847: Jens Rynning
- 1848–1851: Bård Larsen Bøgset
- 1852–1859: Lorentz Peter Elster
- 1860–1861: Peter Muus
- 1862–1865: Bertel Gravbrøt
- 1866–1868: Lorentz Nicolai Bøgset
- 1868–1871: Thomas Conrad Hirsch
- 1872–1873: Peter Muus
- 1874–1875: Butulf Brønstad
- 1876–1883: Erik Belbo (V)
- 1884–1887: Gunnerius Larsen (V)
- 1888–1893: Nils Muus (V)
- 1894–1898: Ole Eggen (V)
- 1899–1901: Nils Muus (V)
- 1902–1907: Ole Eggen (V)
- 1908–1916: Lorents Seem (Rp)
- 1917–1919: Johan N. Brede (LL)
- 1920–1922: Størker Jørstad (V)
- 1922-1922: Arne H. Five (LL)
- 1923–1925: Nikolai Kjenstad (Bp)
- 1926–1928: Arne H. Five (V)
- 1929–1934: Olaf Eggen (Bp)
- 1935–1937: Emil Mona (Bp)
- 1938–1945: Olaf Eggen (Bp/NS))
- 1945–1945: Emil Mona (Bp)
- 1945–1945: Peter Finsaas (V)
- 1946–1947: Jon Viem (Ap)
- 1948–1948: Peter Finsaas (V)
- 1948–1951: Johannes Gåsmo (Bp)
- 1952–1955: Jon Viem (Ap)
- 1956–1963: Johannes Gåsmo (Sp)
- 1964–1967: Åsmund Grande (Sp)
- 1968–1975: Arne Sandnes (Sp)
- 1976–1987: Fridtjof Jørstad (Sp)
- 1988–1989: Ludvig Lundheim (V)
- 1990–1991: Arnold Skjemstad (Ap)
- 1992–1999: Eystein Bardal (Sp)
- 1999–2003: Alfred Berget (Ap)
- 2003–2015: Vigdis Hjulstad Belbo (Sp)
- 2015–2019: Tone Våg (Ap)
- 2019–present: Arnt Einar Bardal (Sp)

== Transportation ==
The European route E6 highway runs through the municipality on the north side of the Snåsavatnet lake and the Nordland Line runs along the south side of the lake. The train stops at Jørstad Station and Snåsa Station.

== Notable people ==
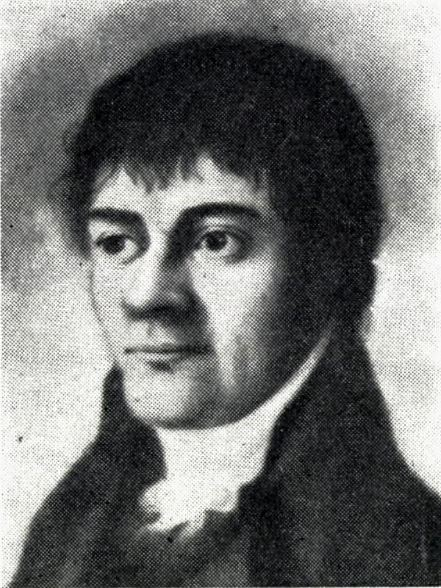
Jens Rynning, Snåsa

- Jens Rynning (1778–1857), a priest and public education advocate who spent his working life as a priest in Ringsaker and Snåsa
- Bernt Julius Muus (1832 in Snåsa – 1900), a Norwegian-American Lutheran minister who helped found St. Olaf College in Northfield, Minnesota
- Peder Falstad (1894 in Snåsa – 1965), an American ski jumper who competed at the 1932 Winter Olympics
- Arne Sandnes (1924 in Snåsa – 2016), a politician and Mayor of Snåsa Municipality
- Joralf Gjerstad (born 1926 in Snåsa – 2021), a self identified psychic and untested faith healer who was known as "the man with warm hands"
- Geir Høgsnes (1950 in Snåsa - 2009), a sociologist and academic
- Jon Åge Tyldum (born 1968 in Snåsa), a former biathlete
- Anders Eide (born 1971 in Snåsa), a cross-country skier who competed at the 1998 Winter Olympics

== Media gallery ==
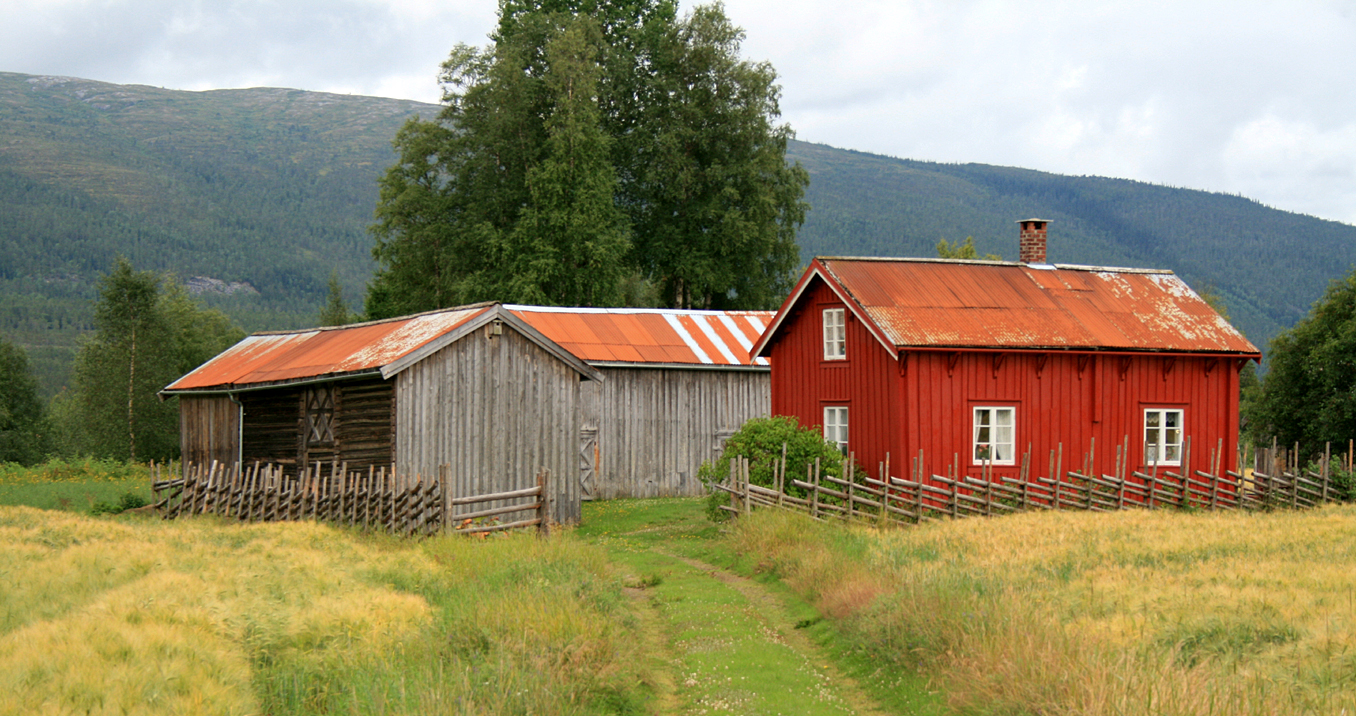
Sandmo, old husmannsplass, now protected

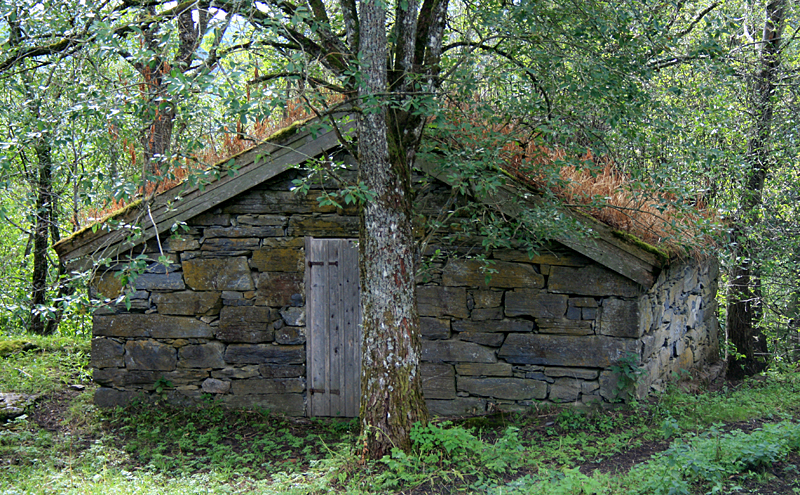
Protected building at Vinje old Vicarage

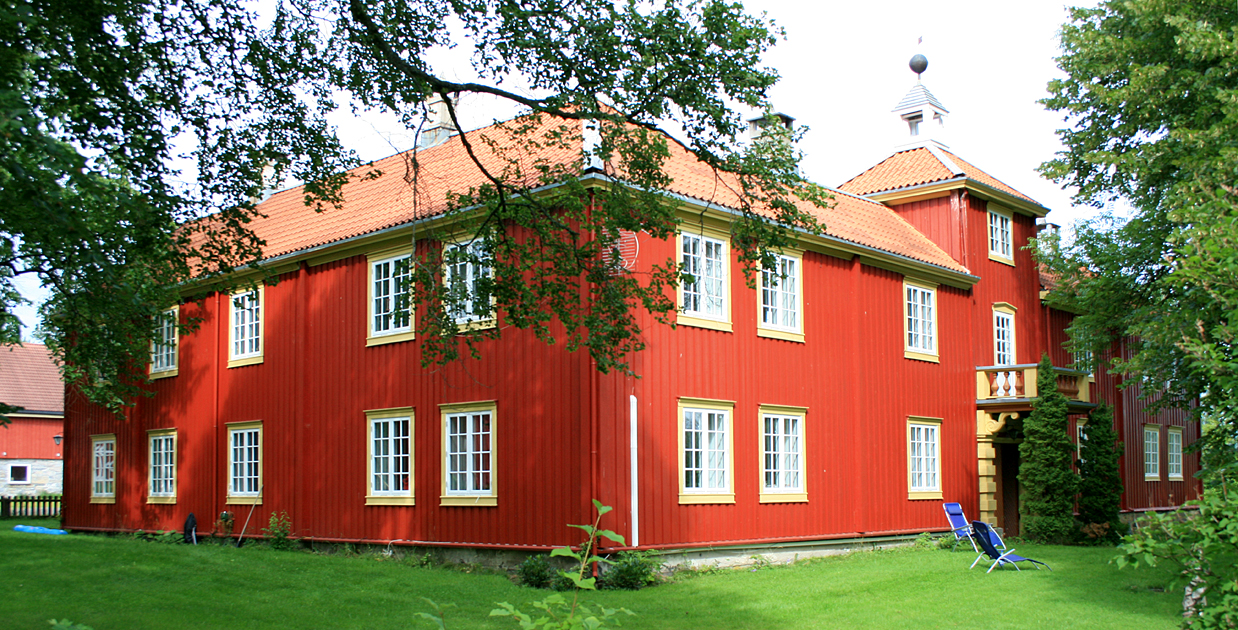
The main building, Vinje vicarage from the 18th century

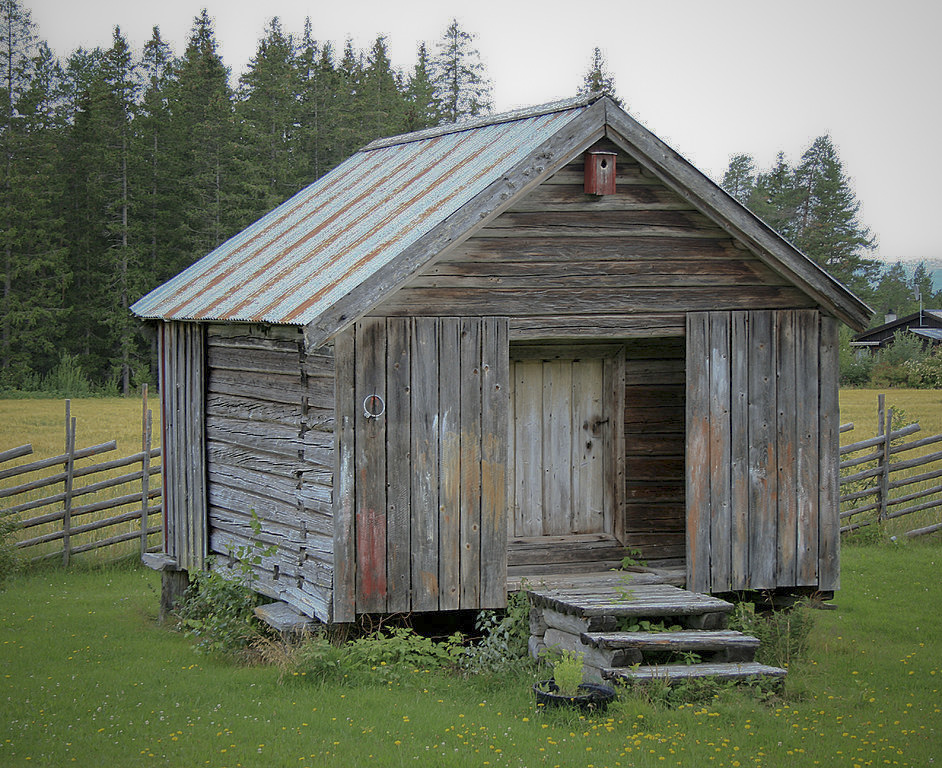
Stabbur hus storage shed

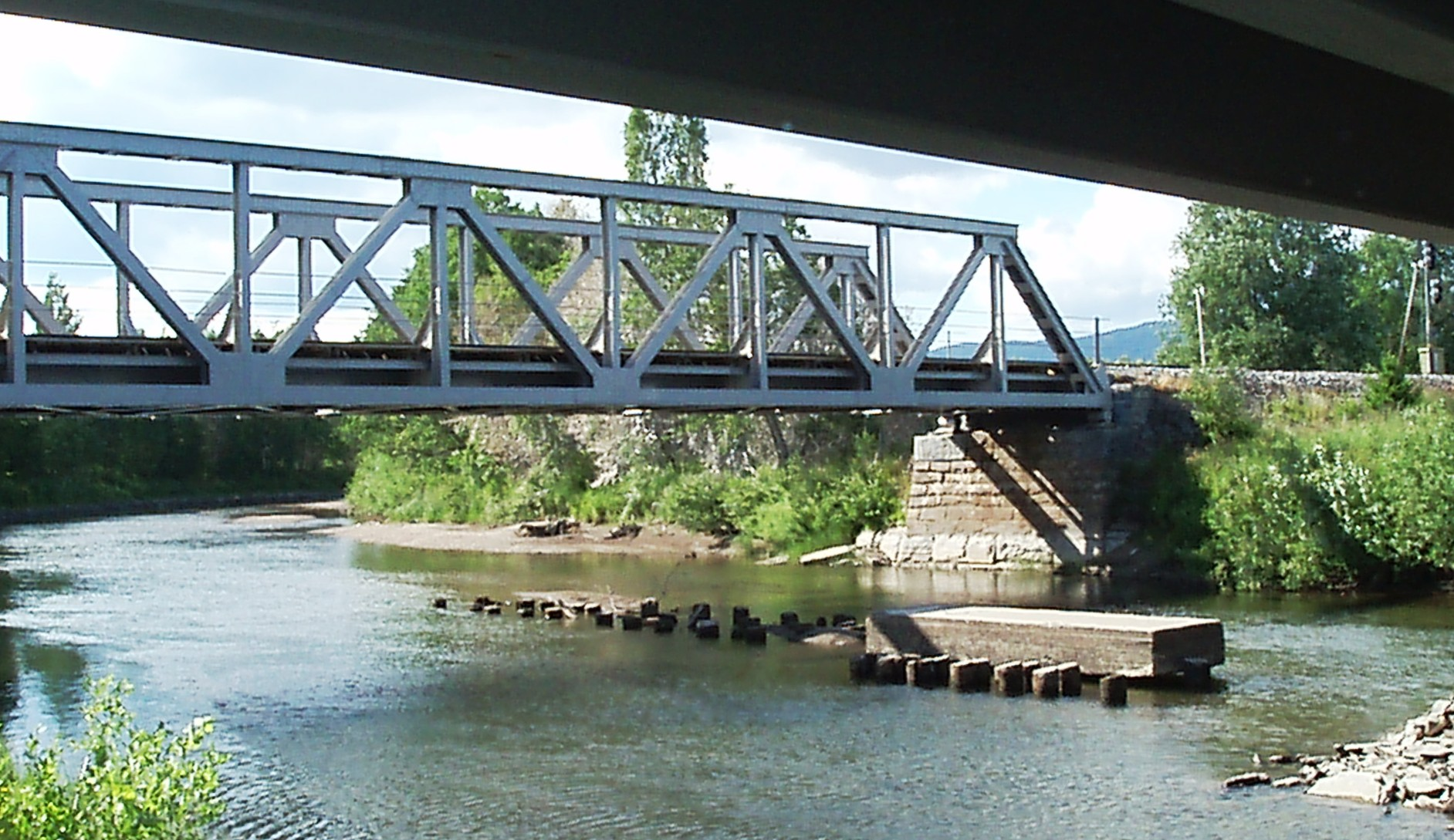
Jørstadelva railway bridge

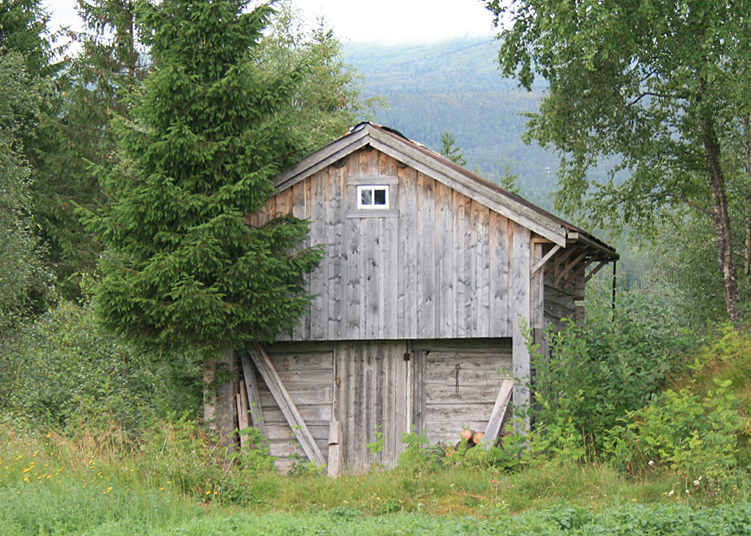
Bekkestue at Sandmo
