= Snåsa (village) =

Village in Snåsa Municipality, Norway

Snåsa (Norwegian) Snåase (Southern Sami)
- Village
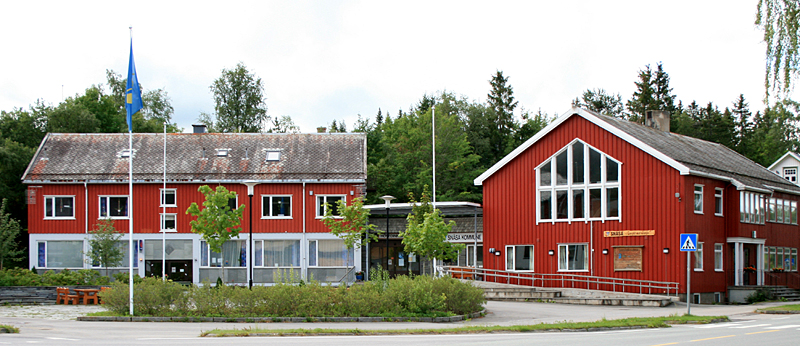
- View of the municipal government building in Snåsa
- Interactive map of Snåsa (Norwegian); Snåase (Southern Sami)
- Location within Trøndelag Location within Norway
- Coordinates: 64.2456°N 12.3818°E
- Country: Norway
- Region: Central Norway
- County: Trøndelag
- District: Innherred
- Municipality: Snåsa Municipality

Area
  - Total: 0.84 km^{2} (0.32 sq mi)
- Elevation: 74 m (243 ft)

Population (2024)
  - Total: 658
  - Density: 783/km^{2} (2,030/sq mi)
- Time zone: UTC+01:00 (CET)
  - Summer (DST): UTC+02:00 (CEST)
- Post Code: 7760 Snåsa

Snåsa (Norwegian) or Snåase (Southern Sami) is the administrative center of Snåsa Municipality in Trøndelag county, Norway. The village is situated on the northern end of the lake of Snåsavatnet, just northeast of the village of Jørstad and southwest of the village of Agle.

The village grew up around the Viosen area on the shore of the lake. Today, much of the village is located further inland. The Nordlandsbanen railway line runs through the village, stopping at Snåsa Station. Snåsa Church, built in 1200, is also located in the village.

The 0.84-square-kilometre (210-acre) village has a population (2024) of 658 and a population density of 783 inhabitants per square kilometre (2,030/sq mi).

== Name ==
The village is named after the old prestegjeld of Snåsa (Old Norse: Snǫs). The name is derived from the word snǫs which means "prominent mountain" or "overhanging rock" (possibly referring to the mountain of Bergsåsen, at the inner end of the lake Snåsavatnet).

Historically, the name of the village was spelled Snaasen. On 3 November 1917, a royal resolution changed the spelling of the name to Snaasa. On 21 December 1917, a royal resolution enacted the 1917 Norwegian language reforms. Prior to this change, the name was spelled Snaasa with the digraph "aa", and after this reform, the name was spelled Snåsa, using the letter å instead.

== Media gallery ==
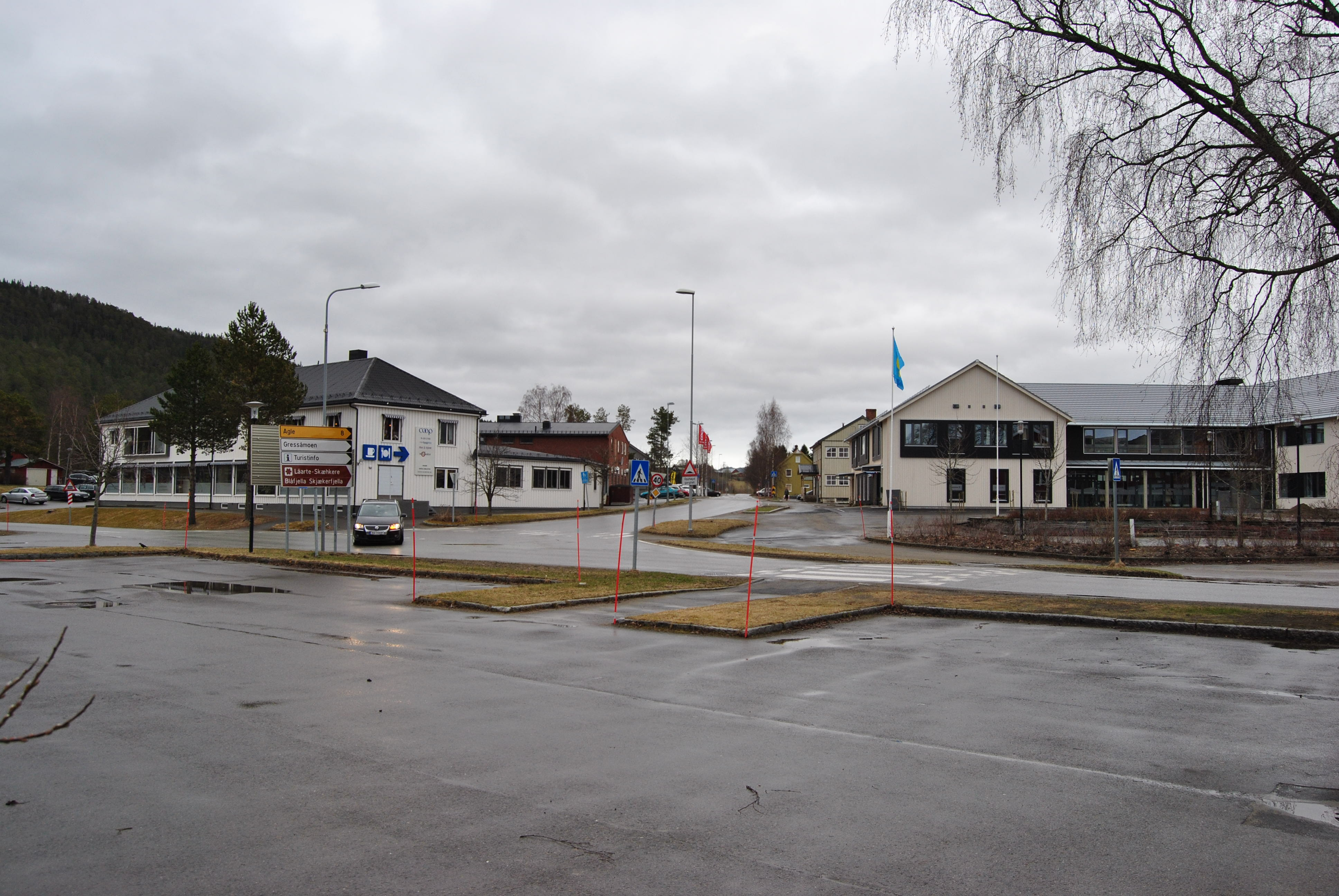
Downtown Snåsa

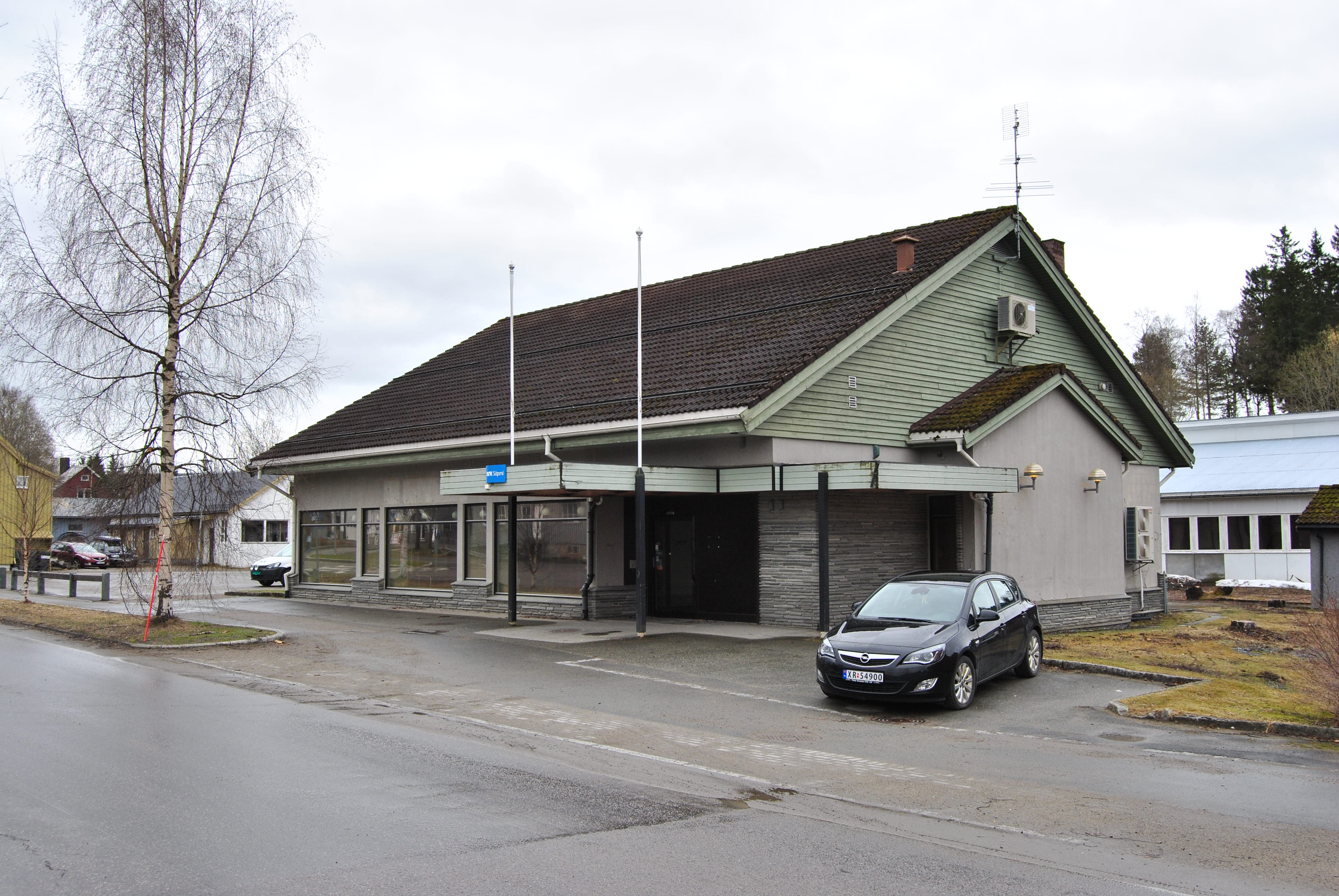
NRK office in Snåsa

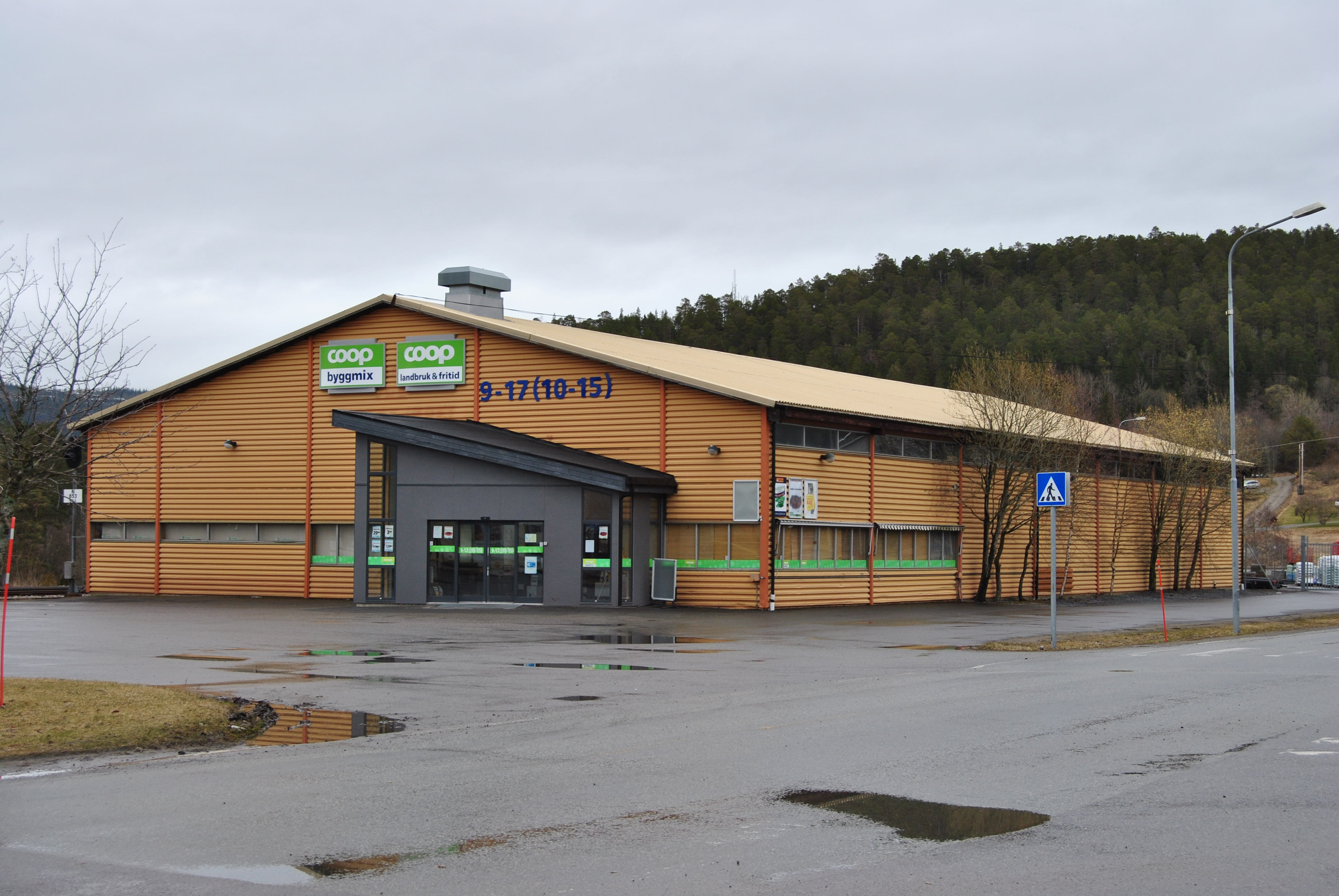
Coop store

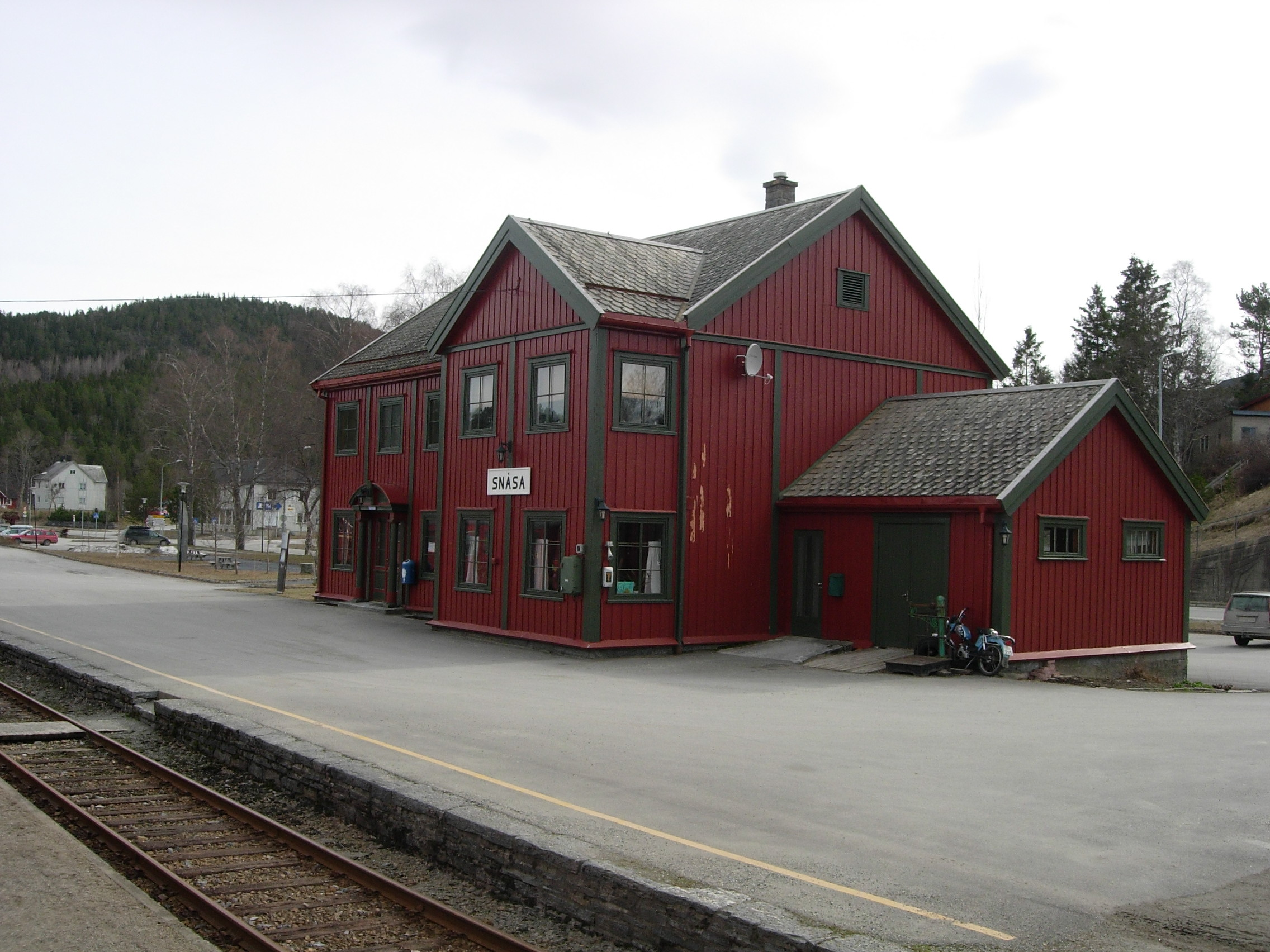
Snåsa railway station

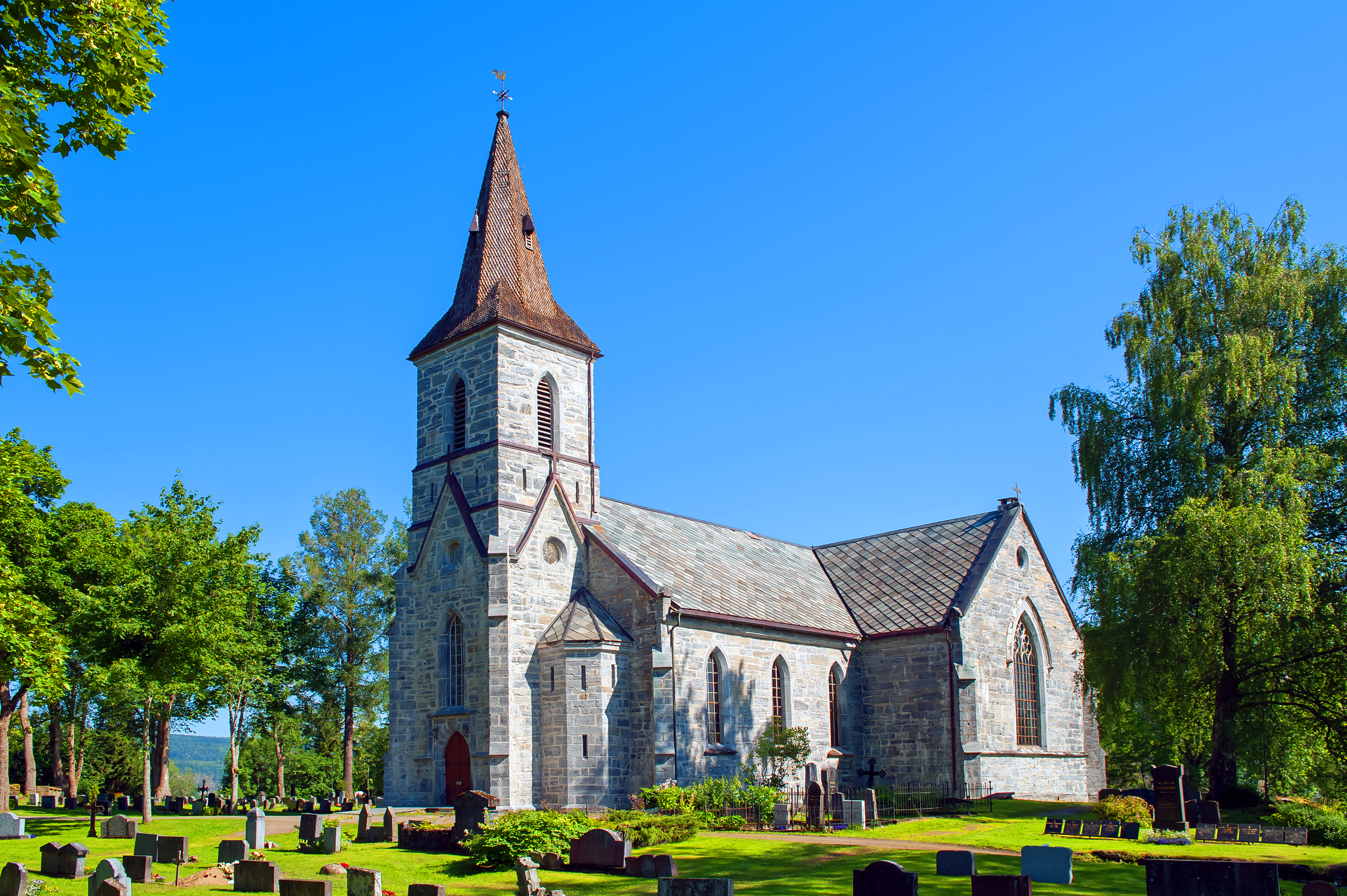
Snåsa Church
