= Blåfjella–Skjækerfjella National Park =

National park in Norway

- IUCN category II (national park)
- Interactive map of Blåfjella–Skjækerfjella National Park
- Location: Trøndelag county, Norway
- Nearest city: Steinkjer
- Coordinates: 64°9′N 13°14′E
- Area: 1,924 km^{2} (743 sq mi)
- Established: 17 December 2004
- Governing body: Directorate for Nature Management

Blåfjella–Skjækerfjella National Park (Norwegian: Blåfjella-Skjækerfjella nasjonalpark, Southern Sami: Låarte-Skæhkere vaarjelimmiedajve) lies in Trøndelag county, Norway. It is the fourth largest national park on the Norwegian mainland and one of the largest remaining true wilderness areas. It is located in the municipalities of Verdal, Snåsa, Grong, Lierne, and Steinkjer. The terrain is characterized by mountain plains, lakes, forested valleys, marshes, and a few mountain peaks (Midtliklumpen reaches 1,333 metres or 4,373 feet above sea level). The Sami people have lived in and used the area for several centuries. There are many Sami cultural monuments here, such as settlements, gathering places, burial sites, and sacred places.

The park offers good opportunities for hunting, fishing, and other outdoor recreation. The terrain is suitable for shooting ptarmigan and other small game, and there are a number of lakes with brown trout and char. There are many paths to hike, some of which are marked, although not in the winter. There are also a few mountain cabins available for overnight stays.

Gressåmoen National Park, which was created in 1970 and had an area of 182 square kilometres (70 sq mi), was incorporated into Blåfjella-Skjækerfjella national park in 2004. Lierne National Park is located just east of Blåfjella–Skjækerfjella National Park.

Kart over nasjonalparker i Sør-Norge.

== Flora and fauna ==
The park is known as the place where spruce was first introduced (migrated) to Norway. There is a large variation of nature types, including areas of undisturbed old-growth forest in the valleys. The flora includes both coastal species as well as more typical inland species, and alpine plants. The geology includes both soft bedrock, which is good for plant growth, as well as areas with very hard bedrock with much poorer plant life.

A total of 28 species of mammals and many species of birds have been observed in the park. The rare Arctic fox and all the large predators in mainland Norway have been found here. This includes Eurasian brown bear, northern lynx, wolverine, and the Eurasian wolf, although the wolf is only rarely seen. There are also three species of deer present: moose, roe deer, and red deer. Four nature reserves are located adjacent to the park: Arvasslia Nature Reserve, Berglimyra and Klumplifjellet Nature Reserve, Gaundalsmyra Nature Reserve, and Storfloa Nature Reserve.

== Name ==
The park was named Blåfjella-Skjækerfjella in 2004 when it was established. Blåfjella means "the blue mountains" (-fjella is the finite plural of fjell which means "fell" or "mountain"). The first element in Skjækerfjella is the plural skjæker which means "shafts (of a wagon)" - here referring to long mountain ridges. Both names are most likely Norwegianizations of the Sami names on these mountain areas: Låarte and Skæhkere.
