= Grong =

Grong may refer to:

- Grong Municipality, Trøndelag county, Norway
  - Medjå (or Grong), a village in Grong Municipality
  - Grong Church, a church in Grong Municipality
  - Grong Station, a railway station in Grong Municipality
- Grong Sparebank, a Norwegian savings bank based in Grong Municipality

== See also ==
- Grong Grong, a small town in New South Wales, Australia
- Grong Grong (band), a punk rock band from Adelaide, South Australia
- Grong Grong (album), the debut studio album of the band Grong Grong
