= Gartland =

Village in Grong Municipality, Norway

- Village
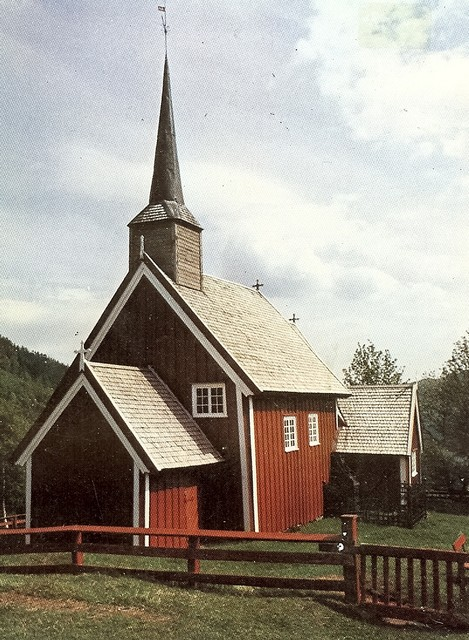
- View of the village church
- Interactive map of Gartland
- Location within Trøndelag Location within Norway
- Coordinates: 64.5333°N 12.3940°E
- Country: Norway
- Region: Central Norway
- County: Trøndelag
- District: Namdalen
- Municipality: Grong Municipality
- Elevation: 95 m (312 ft)
- Time zone: UTC+01:00 (CET)
  - Summer (DST): UTC+02:00 (CEST)
- Post Code: 7873 Harran

Gartland is a village in Grong Municipality in Trøndelag county, Norway. It is located on the northwestern side of the river Namsen about 8 kilometres (5.0 mi) north of the municipal center, Medjå. The village sits along the main European route E6 and the Nordland Line. Directly across the river are the farm areas of Elstad and Rosset. The main sources of income for residents of Gartland is agriculture, forestry, and salmon fishing during the summer. Gartland is a scarcely populated area of about fifteen farms. There is one store in the area which sells building materials.

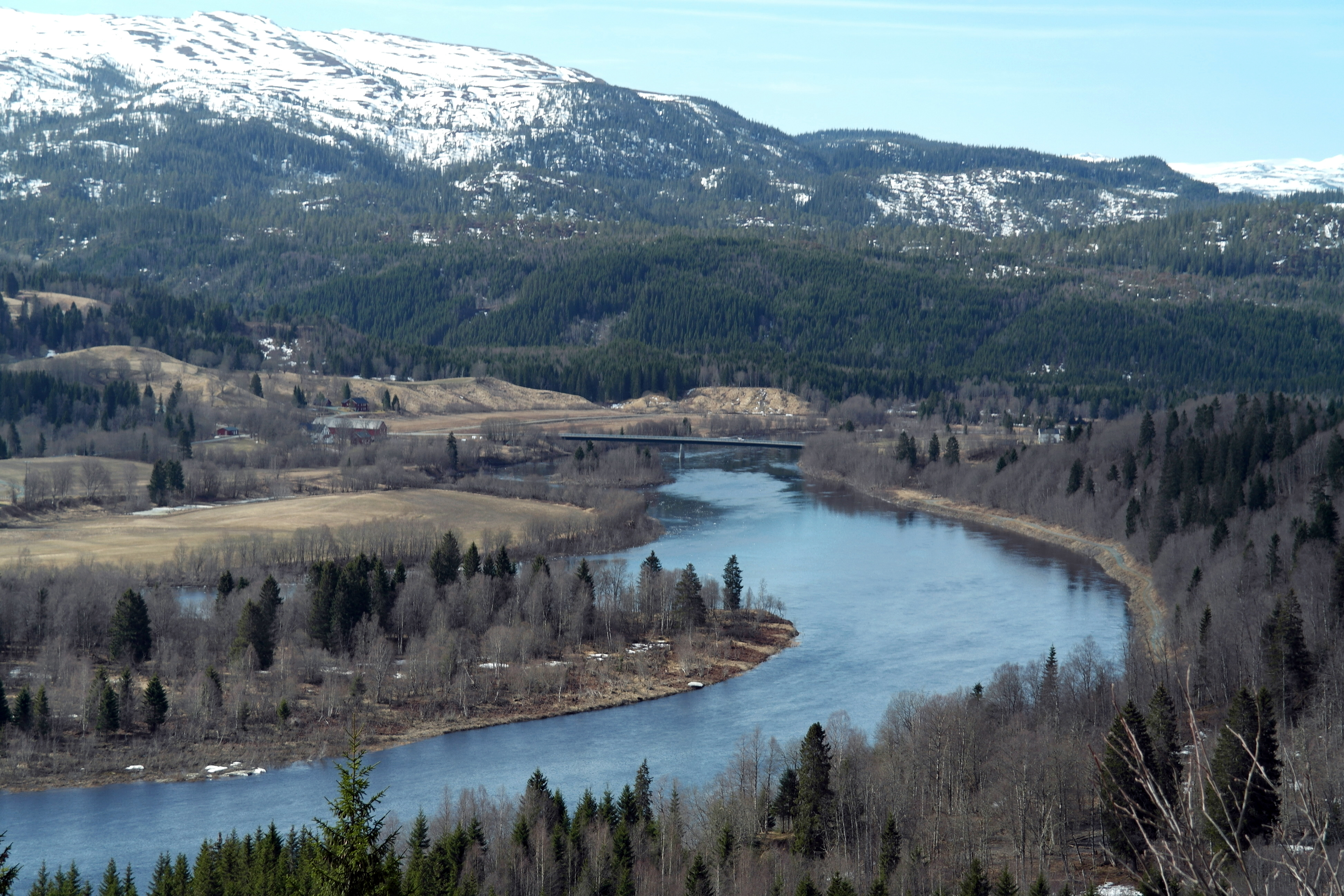
View of the river Namsen, near Gartland

In earlier days, the village of Gartland had a general store, post office, school, and Gløshaug Church (the old church for the southern part of the parish of Harran). Now, only the church which is situated on a hill above Gartland, is still in use. The river Namsen is known for excellent salmon fishing. In the 1800s and 1900s, several Englishmen (some of those were noblemen) owned houses along the river at Gartland, where they lived during their stay in Grong. One was Thomas Merthyr Guest, a man of considerable wealth. He bought two Gartland farms and in 1873 the old Gløshaug Church. Grong Municipality wanted to tear down the old church and build a new church for Harran, but instead Mr. Guest restored it. The new Harran Church was put up at Fiskum in the village of Harran. Mr. Guest's widow sold the church in 1908 to a local farmer who gave the church to the municipality in 1910.

== Name ==
The meaning of the name Gartland (or historically "Galtland") is uncertain. Some think it is derived from the old name for the local river "Galta" or "Garta" (now called Gartlandselva), which flows down into the main river Namsen. Others consider that "Galta" is a form of the male name Galti. In that case, "land" means a large area of land, so Gartland may mean "Galtes land".
