= Grong Sparebank =

Norwegian savings bank

- Company type: Cooperative
- Industry: Financial services
- Founded: 1862
- Headquarters: Grong, Norway
- Area served: Nord-Trøndelag, Norway
- Revenue: ▲NOK 42 million (2006)
- Operating income: NOK 15 million (2006)
- Net income: NOK 10 million (2006)
- Number of employees: 40 (2013)
- Website: www.grong-sparebank.no

Grong Sparebank is a Norwegian savings bank based in Grong Municipality. The bank is affiliated with the Eika Gruppen alliance and has branch offices in Grong, Namsos, Steinkjer and Mosjøen. Total assets are 9.5 billion kr.

== History ==
The sparebank was founded on April 7, 1862, to serve the prestegjeld of Grong which included Grong, Harran, Høylandet, and Røyrvik. By 1905, both Høylandet Municipality and Harran Municipality wanted to have separate banks, and the bank was split into three branches. In 1955, the bank created a separate branch in Røyrvik and Bergsmo, the later being closed in 1997. The year 1975 saw the merger between Grong Sparebank and Lierne Sparebank, though until 2000 there was a separate board of directors for the Lierne branch. In the 2000s, the bank expanded with a branch in Steinkjer and in 2006 it merged with the smallest bank in Norway, Verran Sparebank in Framverran in Mosvik.
