= Harran Municipality =

Former municipality in Trøndelag, Norway

Harran Municipality Harran herred
- Former municipality
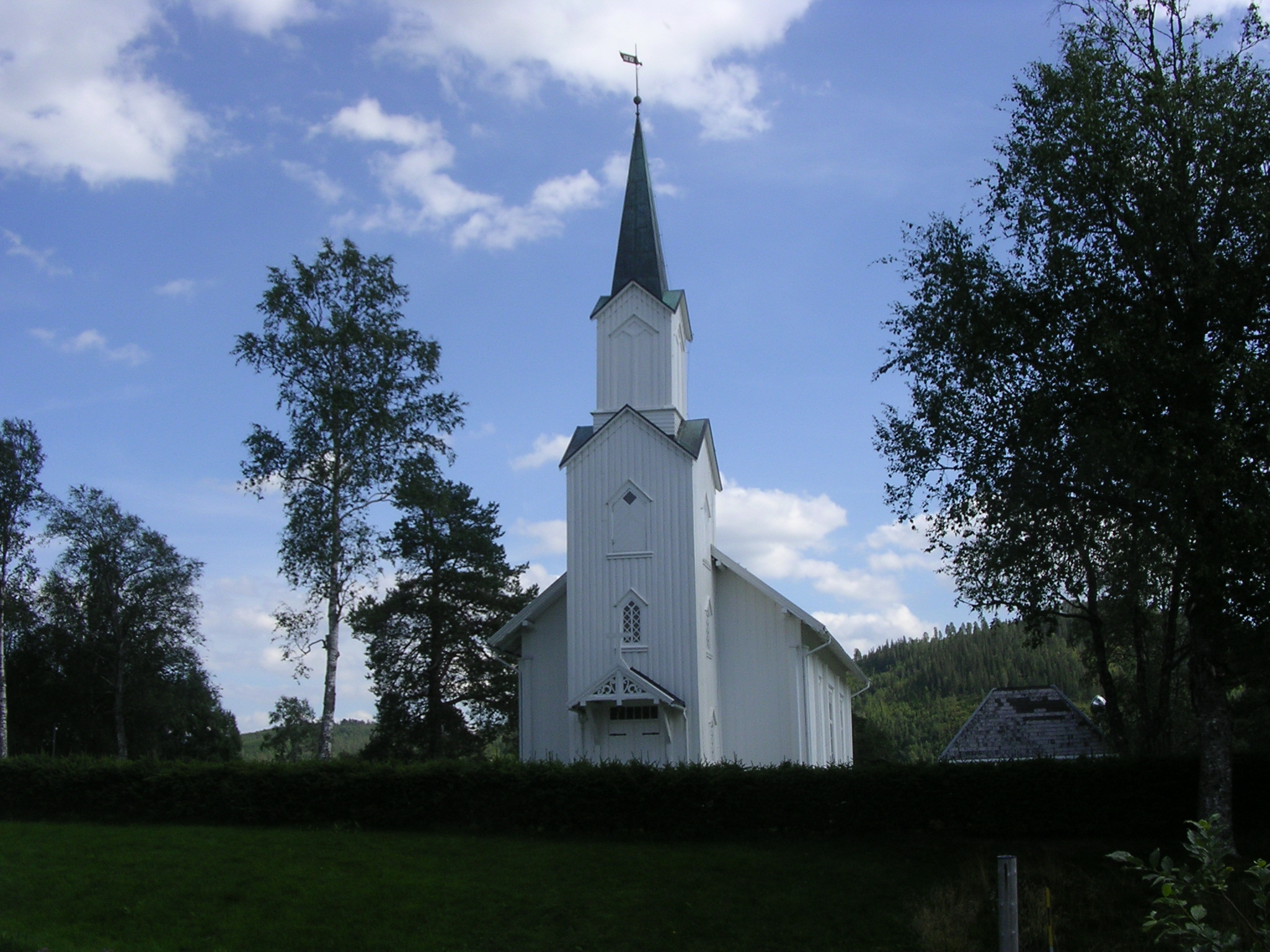
- View of the local church

- Nord-Trøndelag within Norway

- Harran within Nord-Trøndelag
- Coordinates: 64.5610°N 12.4917°E
- Country: Norway
- County: Nord-Trøndelag
- District: Namdalen
- Established: 1 July 1923
  - Preceded by: Grong Municipality
- Disestablished: 1 Jan 1964
  - Succeeded by: Grong Municipality
- Administrative centre: Harran

Government
  - Mayor (1960–1963): Knut Romstad (Ap)

Area (upon dissolution)
  - Total: 606 km^{2} (234 sq mi)
  - Rank: #164 in Norway
- Highest elevation: 1,158.86 m (3,802.0 ft)

Population (1963)
  - Total: 1,111
  - Rank: #597 in Norway
  - Density: 1.8/km^{2} (4.7/sq mi)
  - Change (10 years): ▲ +18.1%
- Demonym: Harrasbygg

Official language
  - Norwegian form: Neutral
- Time zone: UTC+01:00 (CET)
  - Summer (DST): UTC+02:00 (CEST)
- ISO 3166 code: NO-1741

Harran is a former municipality in the old Nord-Trøndelag county, Norway. The municipality existed from 1923 until its dissolution in 1964. The municipality was located in the Namdalen valley and in the northern part of the present-day Grong Municipality in Trøndelag county. The administrative centre was the village of Harran where the Harran Church is located.

Prior to its dissolution in 1964, the 606-square-kilometre (234 sq mi) municipality was the 164th largest by area out of the 689 municipalities in Norway. Harran Municipality was the 597th most populous municipality in Norway with a population of about 1,111. The municipality's population density was 1.8 inhabitants per square kilometre (4.7/sq mi) and its population had increased by 18% over the previous 10-year period.

== General information ==
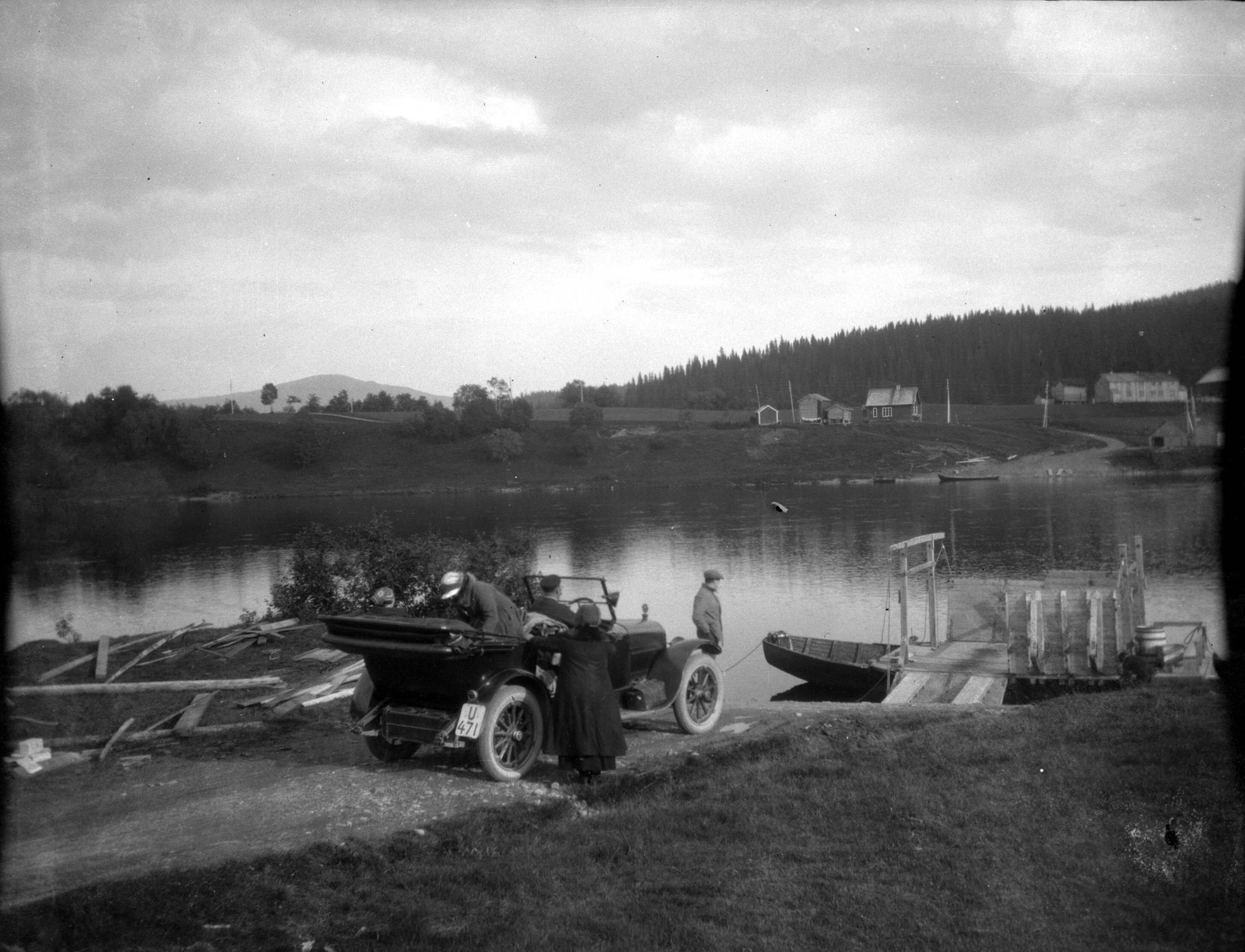
River crossing in Harran in 1920

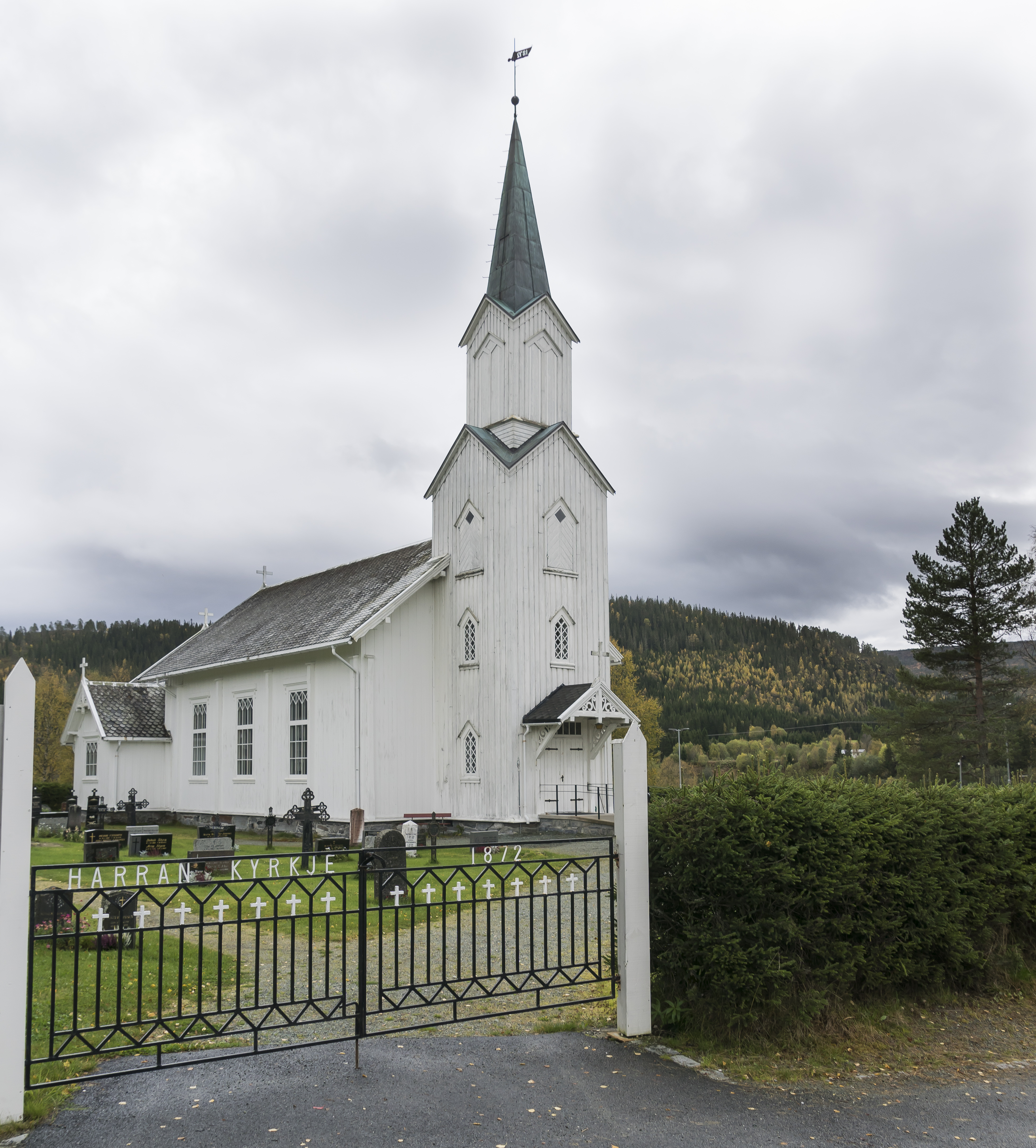
Harran Church

The municipality of Harran was established on 1 July 1923 when the large Grong Municipality was divided into four smaller municipalities: Grong Municipality (population: 1,272), Harran Municipality (population: 630), Røyrvik Municipality (population: 392), and Namsskogan Municipality (population: 469). During the 1960s, there were many municipal mergers across Norway due to the work of the Schei Committee. On 1 January 1964, the neighboring Harran Municipality (population: 1,085) and Grong Municipality (population: 1,962) were merged (back together) to form a new, larger Grong Municipality.

=== Name ===
The origin of the municipal name is uncertain. The area has been known as Harran for quite some time, but the original pronunciation was more like Harrei, so it is possible that the original name was something similar to that. One theory is that the first element comes from the old name for a local river, once known as Herja. The last element may have originally been either eið (which means "isthmus") or ey (which means "island").

=== Churches ===
The Church of Norway had one parish (sokn) within Harran Municipality. At the time of the municipal dissolution, it was part of the Grong prestegjeld and the Indre Namdal prosti (deanery) in the Diocese of Nidaros.

Churches in Harran Municipality
Parish (sokn)	Church name	Location of the church	Year built
Harran	Gløshaug Church	Gartland	1689
Harran	Harran Church	Harran	1874

== Geography ==
The highest point in the municipality was the 1,158.86-metre (3,802.0 ft) tall mountain Heimdalhaugen. The municipality was located in the Namdalen valley. Namsskogan Municipality was to the northeast, Høylandet Municipality was to the northeast, and Grong Municipality was to the south.

== Government ==
During its existence, Harran Municipality was responsible for primary education (through 10th grade), outpatient health services, senior citizen services, welfare and other social services, zoning, economic development, and municipal roads and utilities. The municipality was governed by a municipal council of directly elected representatives. The mayor was indirectly elected by a vote of the municipal council. The municipality was under the jurisdiction of the Frostating Court of Appeal.

=== Municipal council ===
The municipal council (Herredsstyre) of Harran Municipality was made up of 17 representatives that were elected to four year terms. The tables below show the historical composition of the council by political party.

Harran herredsstyre 1959–1963
Party name (in Norwegian)	Number of representatives
Labour Party (Arbeiderpartiet)	10
Joint List(s) of Non-Socialist Parties (Borgerlige Felleslister)	7
Total number of members:	17
Note: On 1 January 1964, Harran Municipality became part of Grong Municipality.

Harran herredsstyre 1955–1959
Party name (in Norwegian)	Number of representatives
Labour Party (Arbeiderpartiet)	8
Joint List(s) of Non-Socialist Parties (Borgerlige Felleslister)	9
Total number of members:	17

Harran herredsstyre 1951–1955
Party name (in Norwegian)	Number of representatives
Labour Party (Arbeiderpartiet)	8
Farmers' Party (Bondepartiet)	4
Liberal Party (Venstre)	4
Total number of members:	16

Harran herredsstyre 1947–1951
Party name (in Norwegian)	Number of representatives
Labour Party (Arbeiderpartiet)	8
Farmers' Party (Bondepartiet)	4
Liberal Party (Venstre)	4
Total number of members:	16

Harran herredsstyre 1945–1947
Party name (in Norwegian)	Number of representatives
Labour Party (Arbeiderpartiet)	9
Liberal Party (Venstre)	4
Joint List(s) of Non-Socialist Parties (Borgerlige Felleslister)	3
Total number of members:	16

Harran herredsstyre 1937–1941*
Party name (in Norwegian)	Number of representatives
Labour Party (Arbeiderpartiet)	10
Joint List(s) of Non-Socialist Parties (Borgerlige Felleslister)	6
Total number of members:	16
Note: Due to the German occupation of Norway during World War II, no elections were held for new municipal councils until after the war ended in 1945.

=== Mayors ===
The mayor (Norwegian: ordfører) of Harran Municipality was the political leader of the municipality and the chairperson of the municipal council. Here is a list of people who held this position:

- 1923–1928: Johannes Mørkved (Bp)
- 1929–1934: Johannes J. Fiskum (V)
- 1935–1941: Severin Melby (Ap)
- 1941–1945: Tore Rigstad Kristiansen (NS)
- 1945–1951: Severin Melby (Ap)
- 1952–1958: Ivar Iversen (V)
- 1959–1959: Torleif Hermanstad (Bp)
- 1960–1963: Knut Romstad (Ap)

== See also ==
- List of former municipalities of Norway
