= Gløshaug Church =

Church in Trøndelag, Norway

- Gløshaug kirke
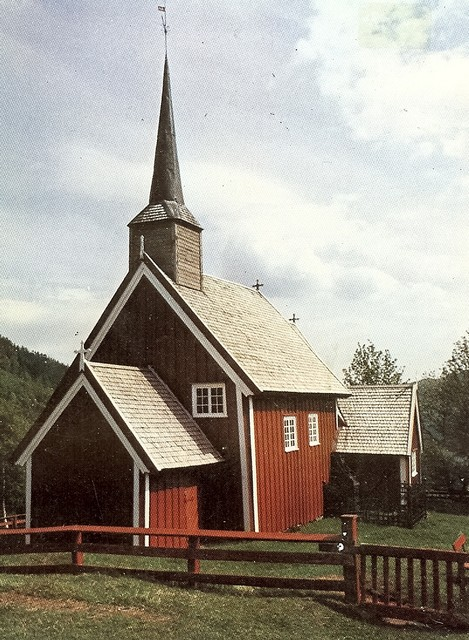
- View of the church
- Gløshaug Church
- 64.53479772°N 12.40173384°E
- Location: Grong Municipality, Trøndelag
- Country: Norway
- Denomination: Church of Norway
- Churchmanship: Evangelical Lutheran

History
- Status: Parish church
- Founded: 1170
- Consecrated: 1689

Architecture
- Functional status: Active
- Architect: Bjørn Larsen
- Architectural type: Long church
- Completed: 1689 (337 years ago)

Specifications
- Capacity: 100
- Materials: Wood

Administration
- Diocese: Nidaros bispedømme
- Deanery: Namdal prosti
- Parish: Harran
- Norwegian Cultural Heritage Site
- Type: Church
- Status: Automatically protected
- ID: 84270

Gløshaug Church (Norwegian: Gløshaug kirke) is a parish church of the Church of Norway in Grong Municipality in Trøndelag county, Norway. It is located in the village of Gartland. It is one of the two churches for the Harran parish which is part of the Namdal prosti (deanery) in the Diocese of Nidaros. The red, wooden stave church was built in a long church style in 1689. The church seats about 100 people.

== History ==
The site of Gløshaug Church has been used all the way back to around the year 1160. It originally was a St. Olaf church according to Grankvist. A manuscript from 1597 ("Gaannske Nommedalls Leens Beskriffuelse") called the church "Olafshougs Kirke i Hærø fierding", meaning St. Olaf's Church of Harran. St. Olaf is the patron saint of Norway. The first church building on this site was built around 1170, and it was restored in 1433 and again in 1510. In 1689, the old church had reached the point where it was in very poor shape, so it was torn down and replaced with a new stave church, which still stands today. St. Olaf's Church was for centuries the main church for all of the people that lived in the upper inner part of Namdalen (the old "Overhalla" parish).

In the 1800s and 1900s, several Englishmen (some of those were noblemen) owned houses along the river at Gartland, where they lived during their stay in Grong. One was Thomas Merthyr Guest, a man of considerable wealth. He bought two Gartland farms and in 1873, he bought the old Gløshaug Church to prevent it from being torn down. Grong Municipality wanted to tear down the old church and build a new church for Harran, but instead Mr. Guest purchased it and restored it. Meanwhile, the municipality built the new Harran Church in 1874 at Fiskum in the nearby village of Harran, about 5 kilometres (3.1 mi) to the northeast. Mr. Guest's widow sold the church in 1908 to a local farmer who in turn in 1910 gave the church to the municipality.

== Media gallery ==
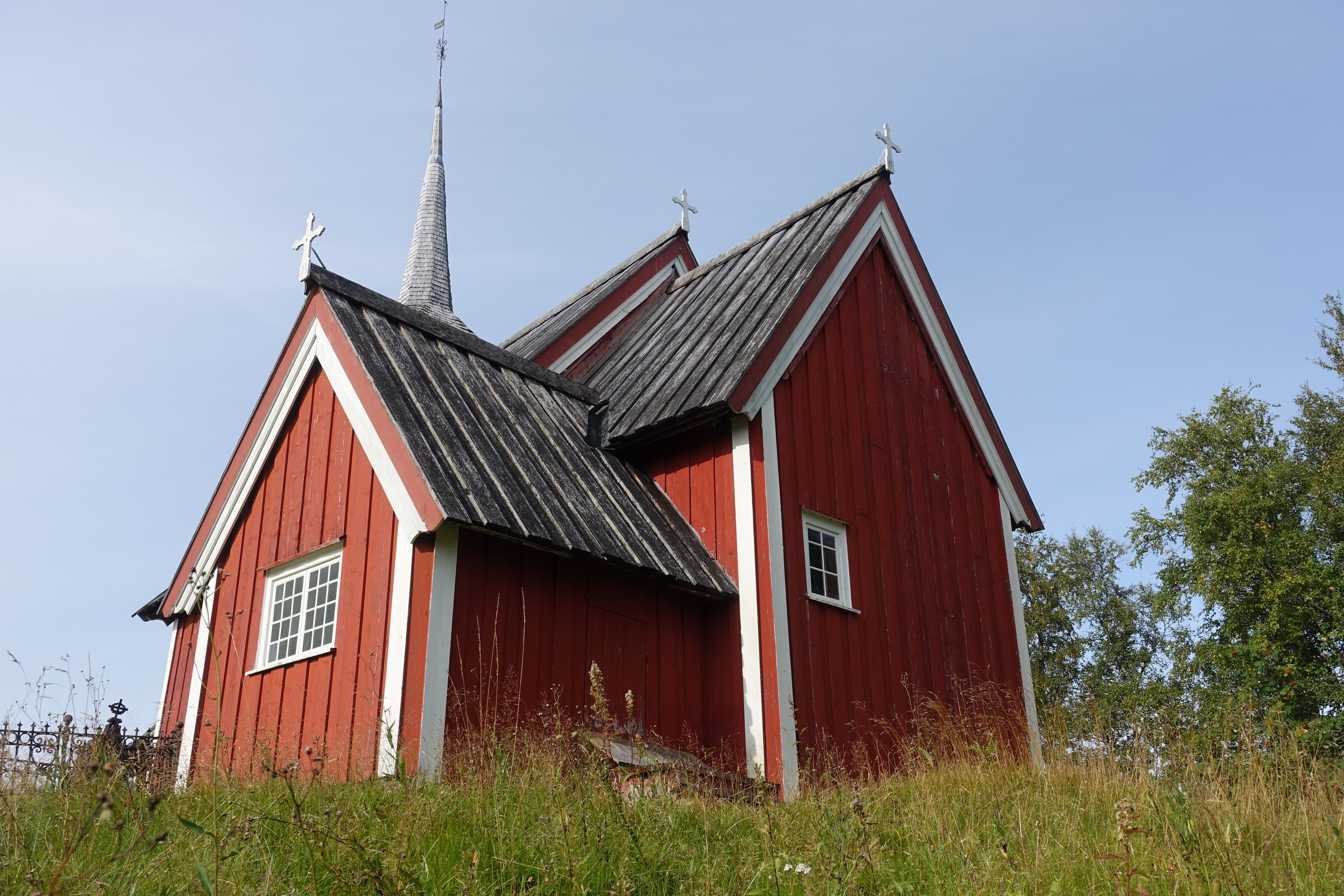

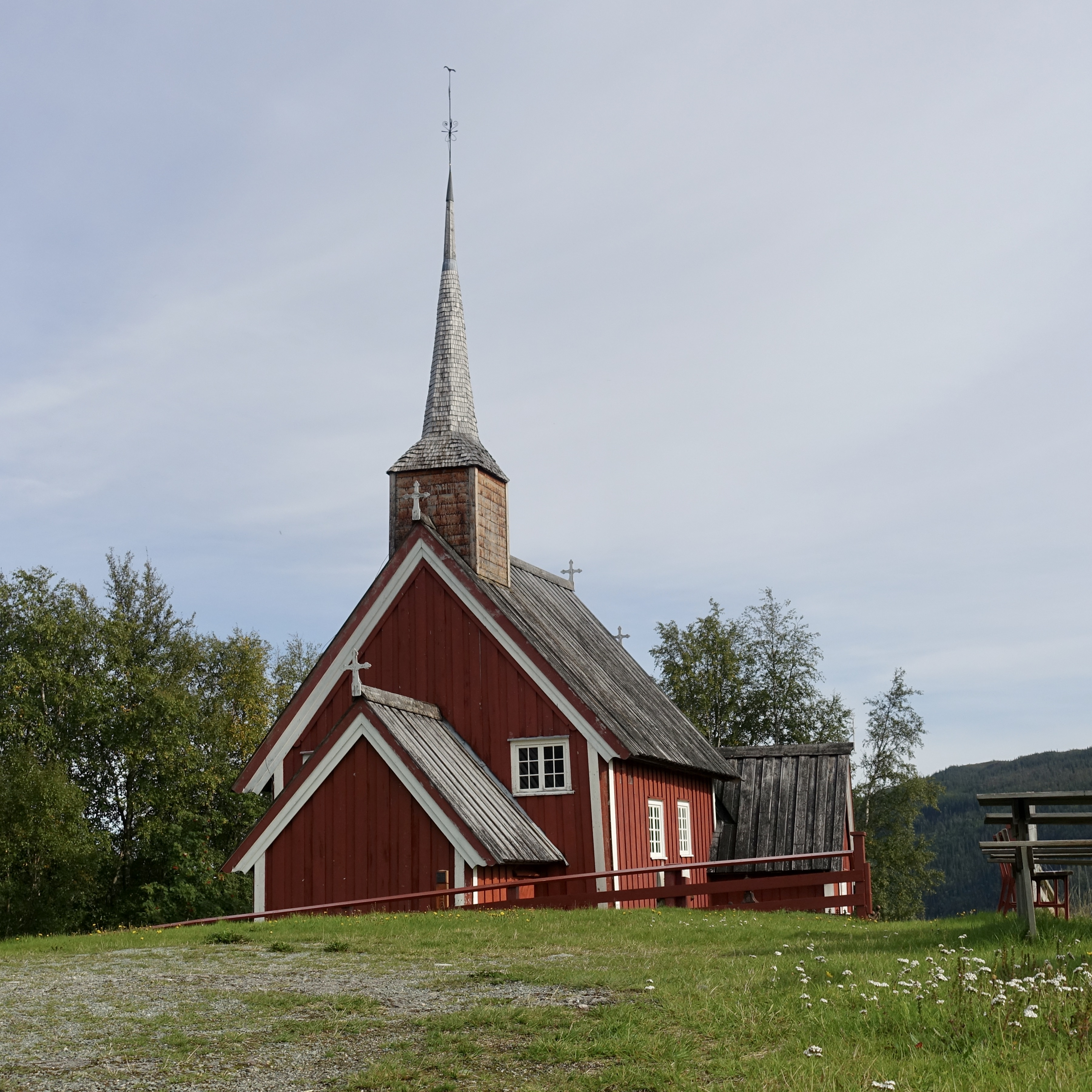

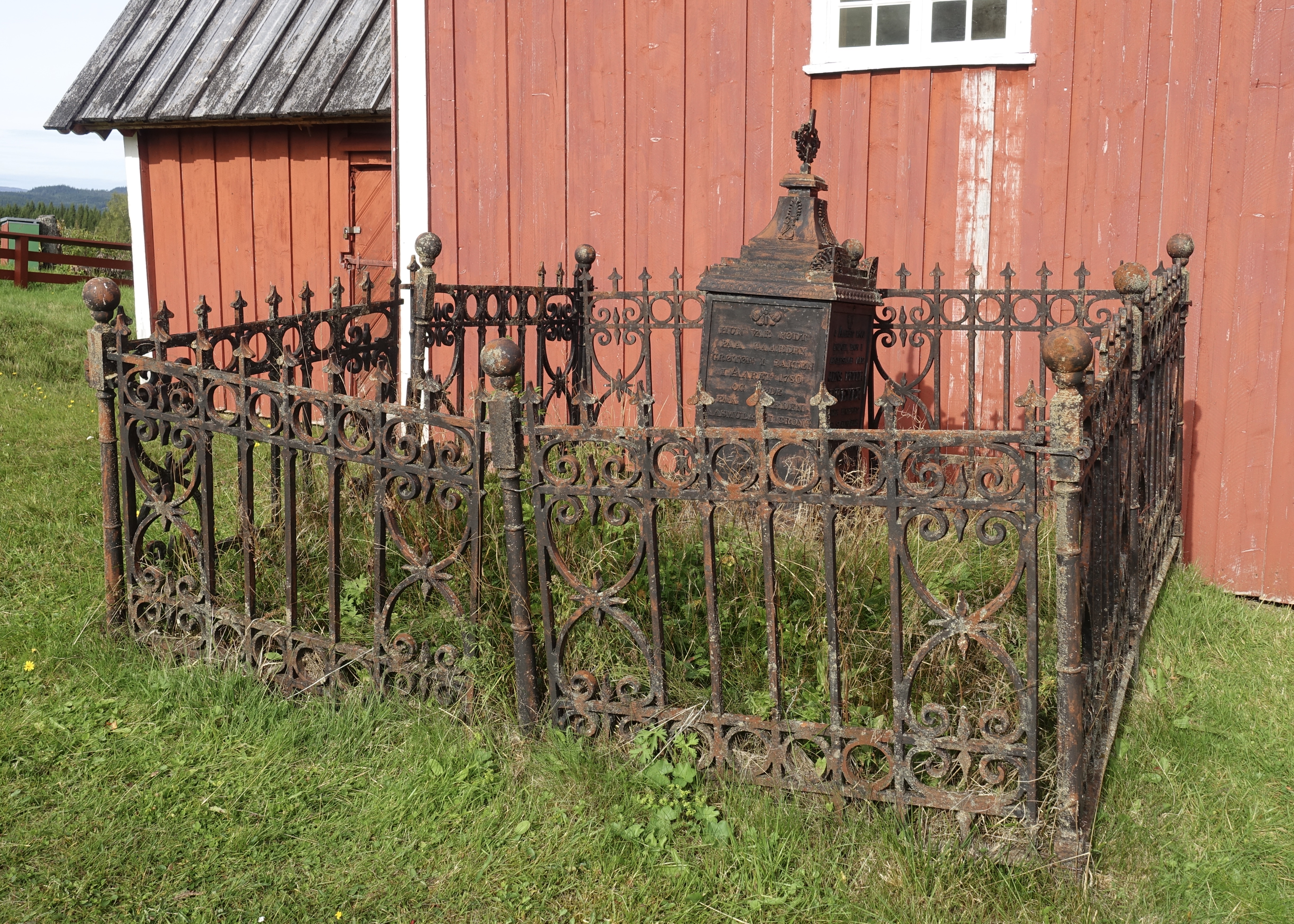

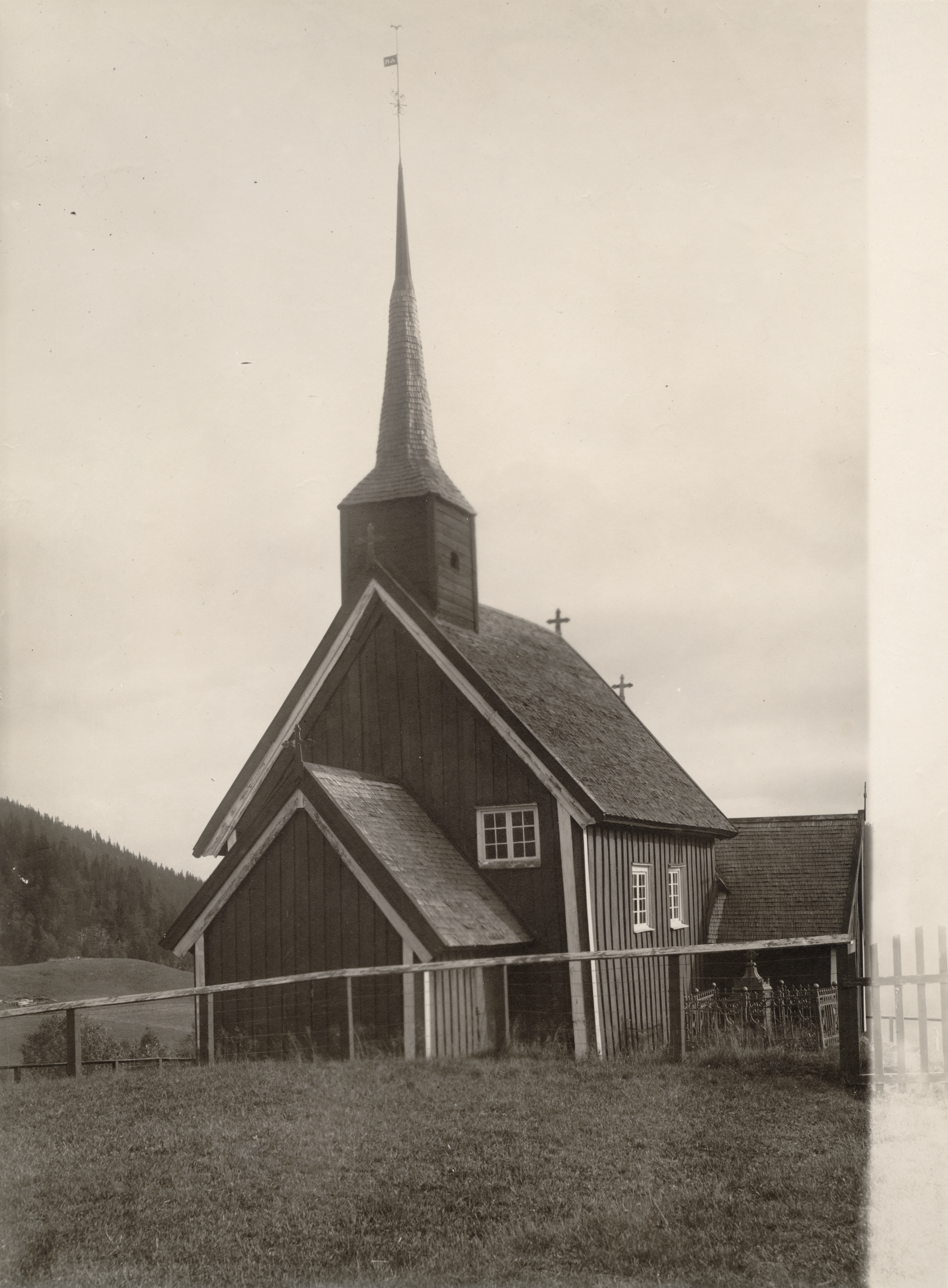

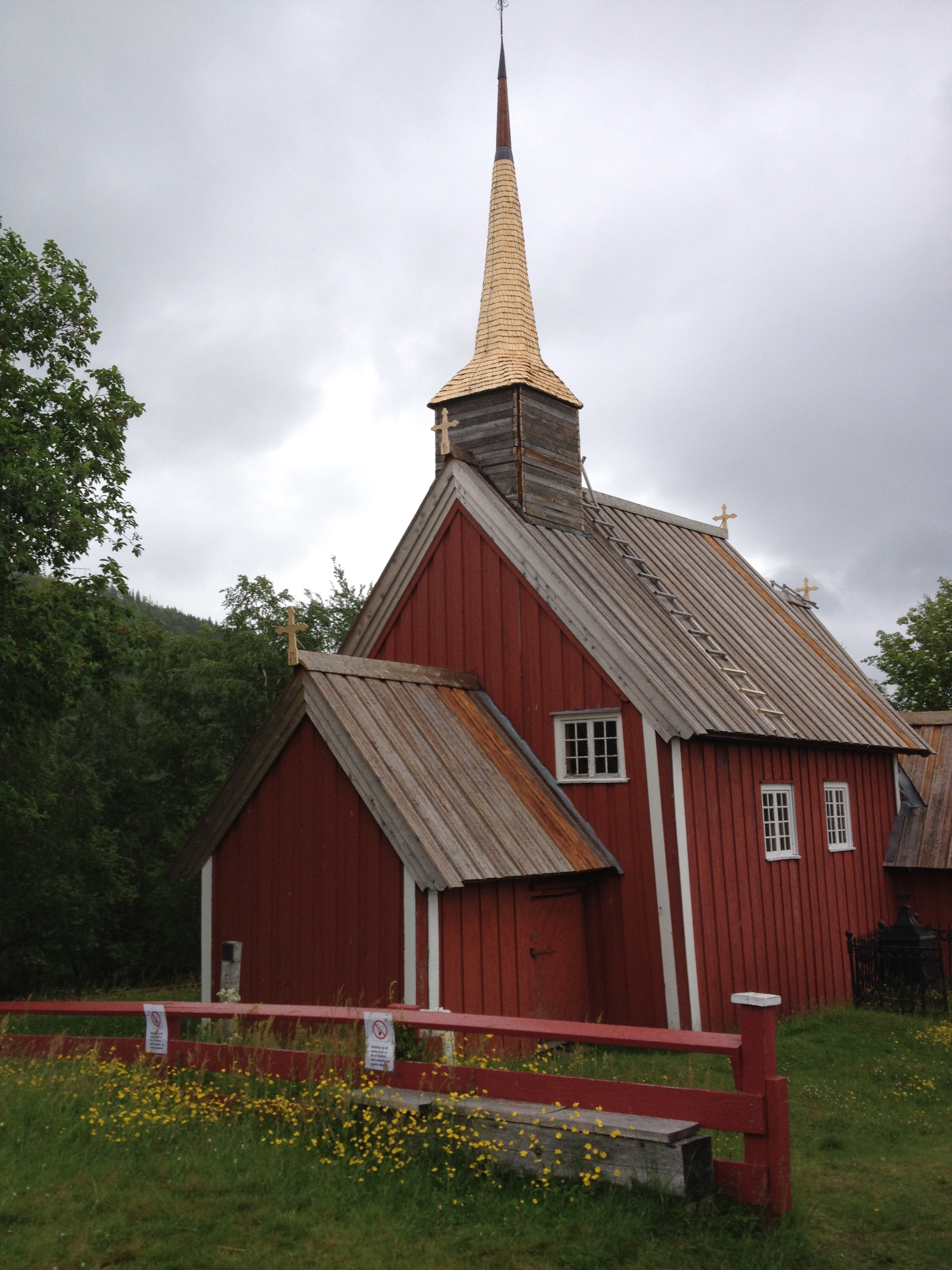
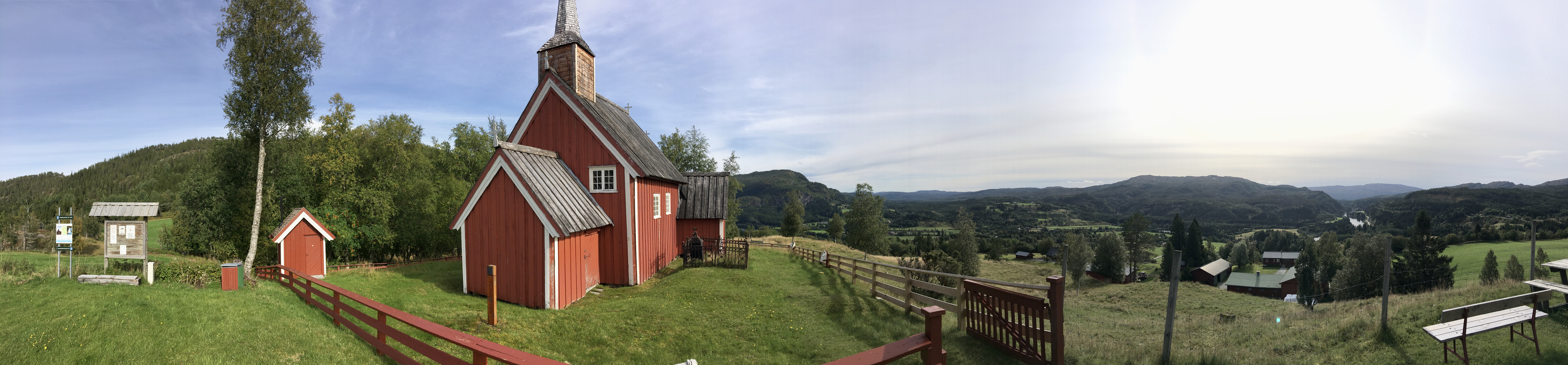

== See also ==
- List of churches in Nidaros
