= Bergsmoen =

Village in Grong Municipality, Norway

- Village
- Interactive map of Bergsmoen
- Location within Trøndelag Location within Norway
- Coordinates: 64.4675°N 12.2184°E
- Country: Norway
- Region: Central Norway
- County: Trøndelag
- District: Namdalen
- Municipality: Grong Municipality

Area
  - Total: 0.42 km^{2} (0.16 sq mi)
- Elevation: 89 m (292 ft)

Population (2023)
  - Total: 213
  - Density: 507/km^{2} (1,310/sq mi)
- Time zone: UTC+01:00 (CET)
  - Summer (DST): UTC+02:00 (CEST)
- Post Code: 7870 Grong

Bergsmoen is a village in Grong Municipality in Trøndelag county, Norway. The village is located about 5 kilometres (3.1 mi) west of Medjå, the municipal center of Grong. The village lies close to the river Namsen in the Namdalen valley and less than 8 kilometres (5.0 mi) southeast from Eidsvatnet. It has a single bus stop in the village center.

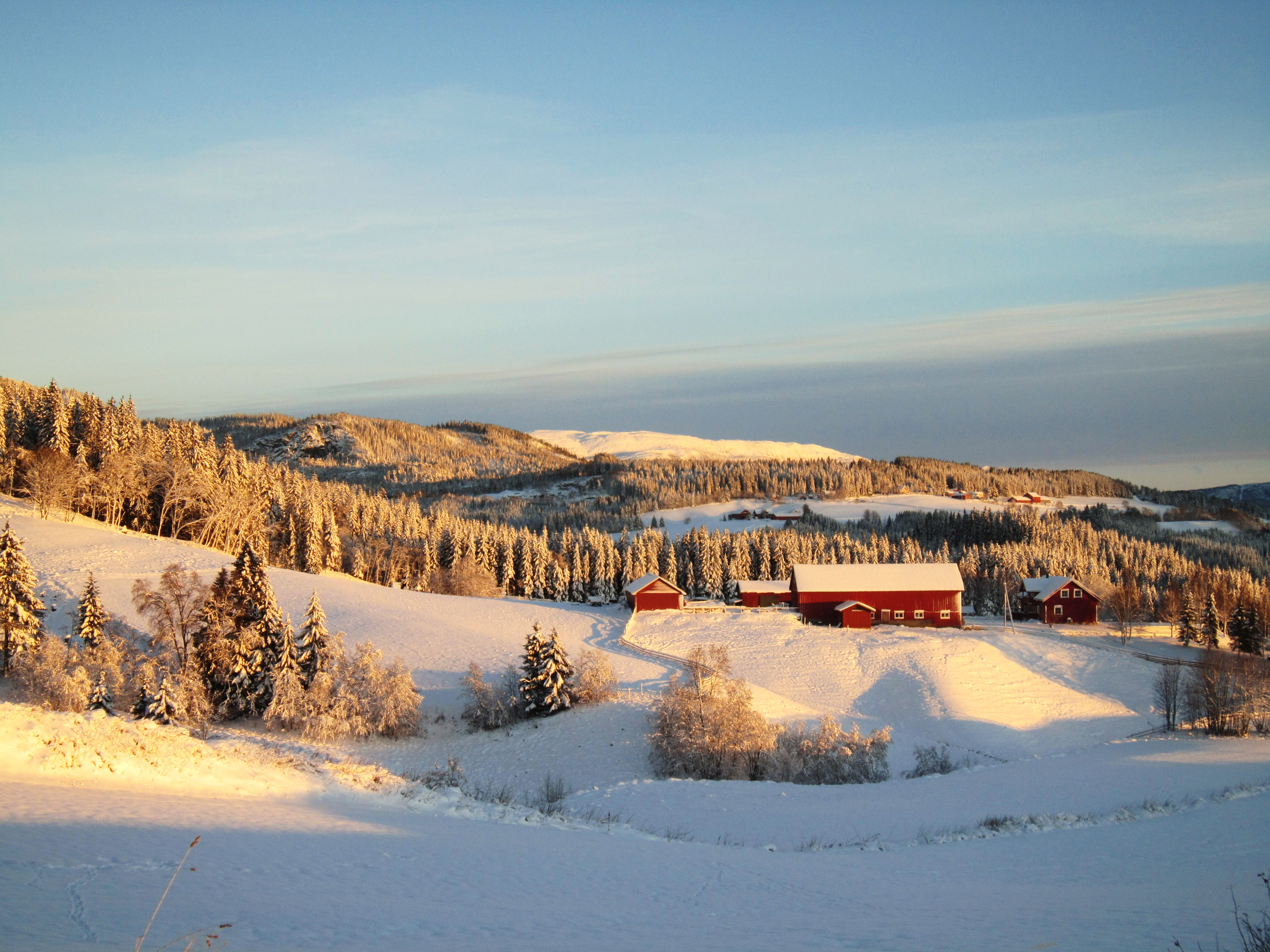
Lilleberre and Bergsmoen

The 0.42-square-kilometre (100-acre) village had a population (2023) of 213 and a population density of 507 inhabitants per square kilometre (1,310/sq mi). Since 2023, the population and area data for this village area has not been separately tracked by Statistics Norway.

Bergsmoen is the home of the Grong Museum.
