= Håkon Mosling =

Norwegian builder and architect

- Born: 16 April 1840; Trondheim, Norway
- Died: 7 October 1914 (aged 74); Flosta, Norway
- Occupation: Architect
- Spouse: Eline Moursund
- Parent(s): Marcus Gabriel Andreas Mosling and Petra Erneste Motzfeldt

Håkon Adelstein Mosling (16 April 1840 - 7 October 1914) was a Norwegian builder and architect.

Mosling lived in several places, including Trondheim (1865–1873), Steinkjer (1874–1894), and Oslo (1894–1914). As part of his architectural practice, he also operated as a builder and for a period he also had a carpentry workshop in Steinkjer. For the last 20 years of his professional life, he was employed as a draftsman for the military at Akershus Fortress in Oslo.

Mosling designed a number of churches in Norway, but due to his limited schooling, several of the drawings underwent extensive proofreading and adjustments by the architect Jacob Wilhelm Nordan who was the architect employed by the Ministry of Church Affairs.

== Works ==
- Brønnøy Church
- Dyrøy Church
- Grong Church
- Heggstad Church
- Lebesby Church (burned down in 1944)
- Levanger Church (burned down in 1877)
- Meløy Church
- Målselv Church
- Namsos Church (burned down in 1897)
- Skjerstad Church (burned down in 1877)
- Prestegård farmhouse in Buksnes
- Sakshaug Church
- Telegraph station in Rørvik
