= Harran, Norway =

Village in Grong Municipality, Norway

Harran
- Village
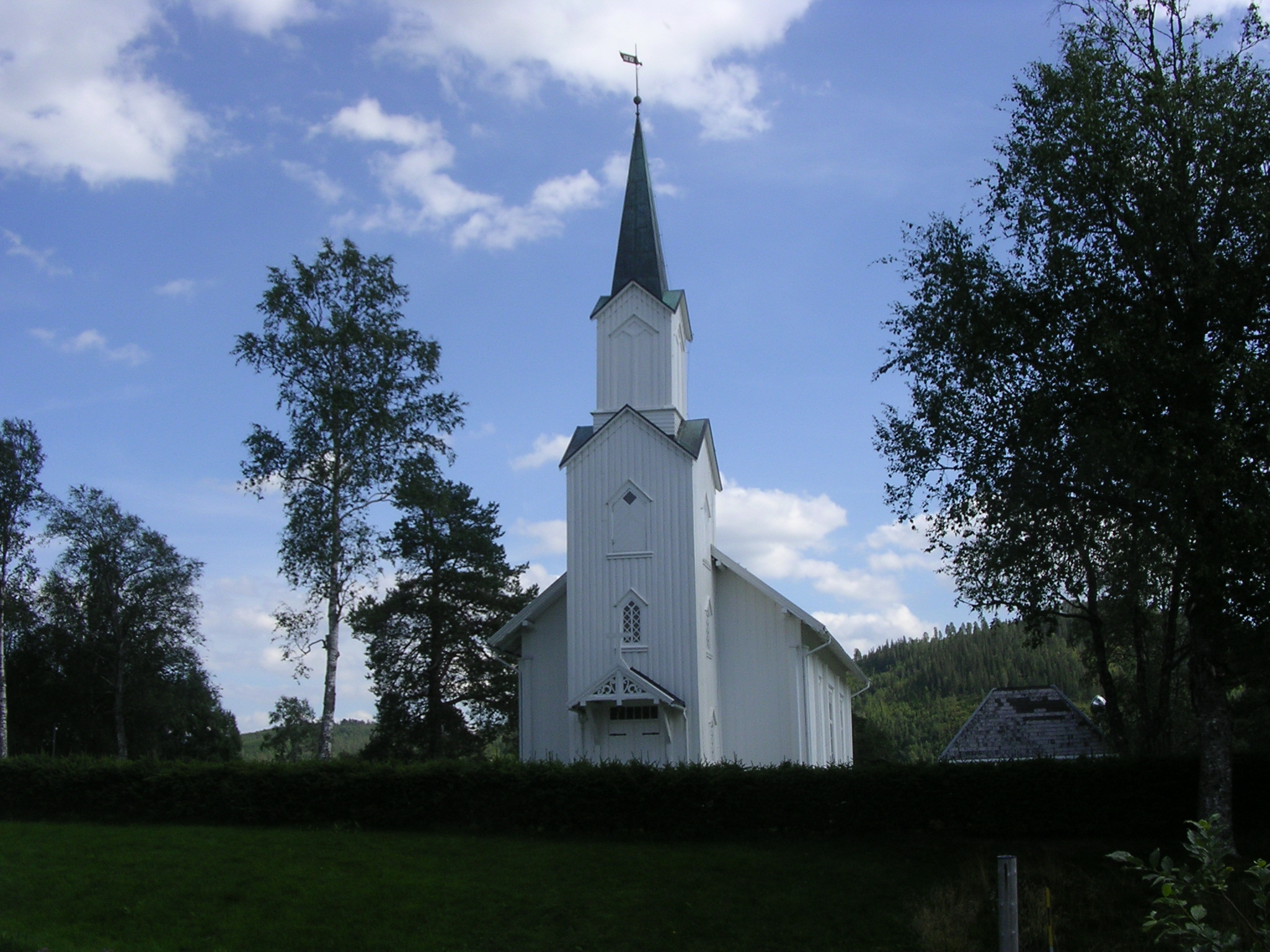
- View of the village church
- Interactive map of Harran
- Location within Trøndelag Location within Norway
- Coordinates: 64.5610°N 12.4917°E
- Country: Norway
- Region: Central Norway
- County: Trøndelag
- District: Namdalen
- Municipality: Grong Municipality
- Elevation: 80 m (260 ft)
- Time zone: UTC+01:00 (CET)
  - Summer (DST): UTC+02:00 (CEST)
- Post Code: 7873 Harran

Harran is a village in Grong Municipality in Trøndelag county, Norway. The village is located along the river Namsen in the Namdalen valley. It is about 15 kilometres (9.3 mi) north of the village of Medjå, the administrative center of Grong. The village of Gartland lies about 6 kilometres (3.7 mi) south of Harran. From 1923 until 1964, this village was the administrative centre of the old Harran Municipality.

The village lies along the European route E6 highway. Harran Station is located in the village along the Nordlandsbanen railway line. The station was opened in 1940, when the railway line was in use to Mosjøen. The station has been unstaffed since 1989. Harran Church is also located in the village of Harran, dating back to 1874.
