= Harran Station =

Railway station in Trøndelag county, Norway

Harran Station Harran stasjon
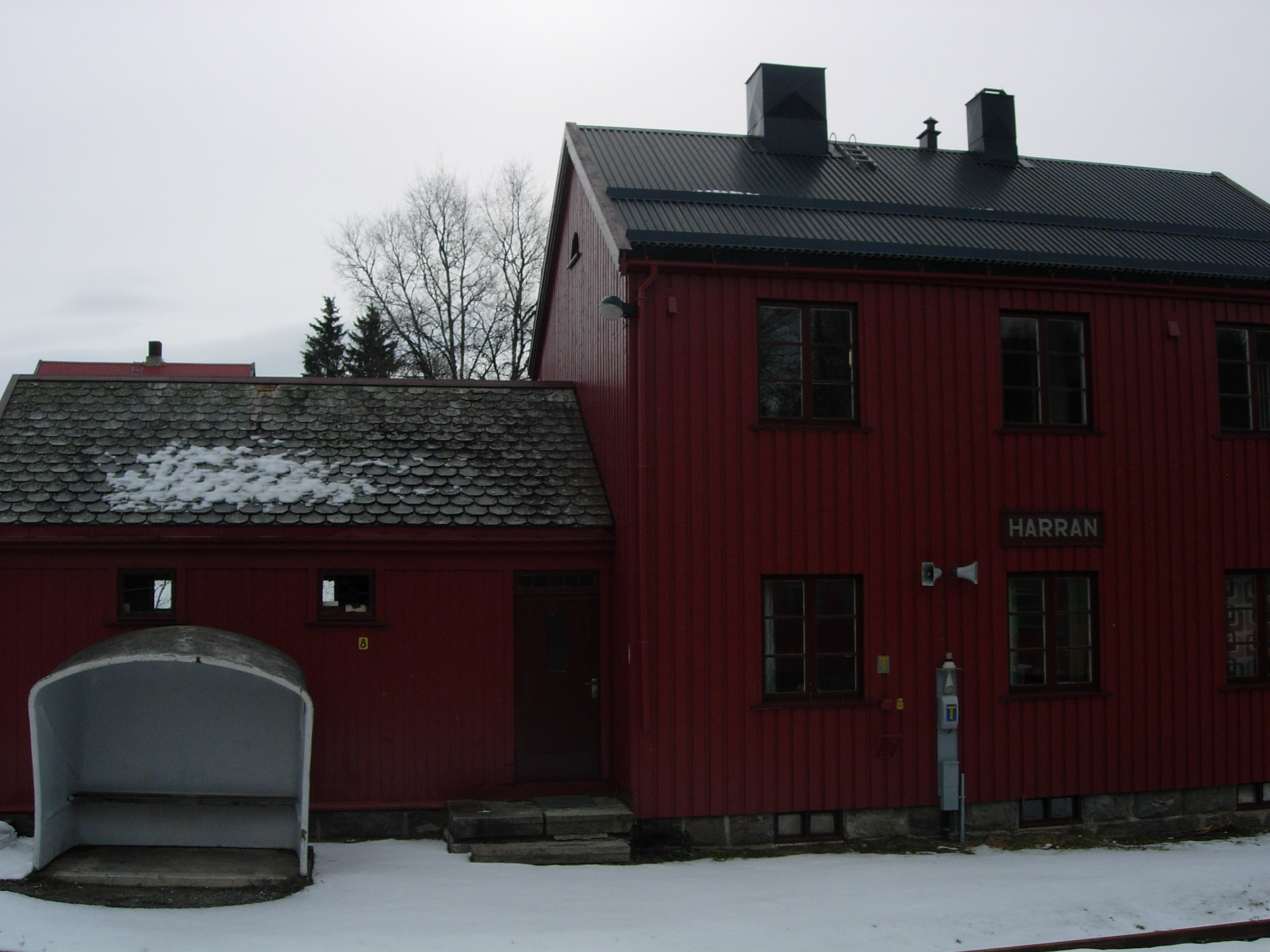
- View of the station

General information
- Location: Harran, Grong Municipality; Trøndelag; Norway
- Coordinates: 64°34′07″N 12°29′39″E
- Elevation: 100.2 metres (329 ft) above sea level
- System: Railway station
- Owner: Bane NOR
- Operator: SJ Norge
- Line: Nordlandsbanen
- Distance: 235.79 kilometres (146.51 mi)

History
- Opened: 5 July 1940
Location
- Location within Trøndelag Location within Norway

Harran Station (Norwegian: Harran stasjon) is a railway station located in the village of Harran in Grong Municipality in Trøndelag county, Norway. It is located on the Nordlandsbanen railway line. The station opened in 1940, and has been unstaffed since 1989.

Preceding station	Express trains	Following station
Grong towards Trondheim S	F7	Lassemoen towards Bodø
