= Brønnøy Church =

Church in Nordland, Norway

- Brønnøy kirke
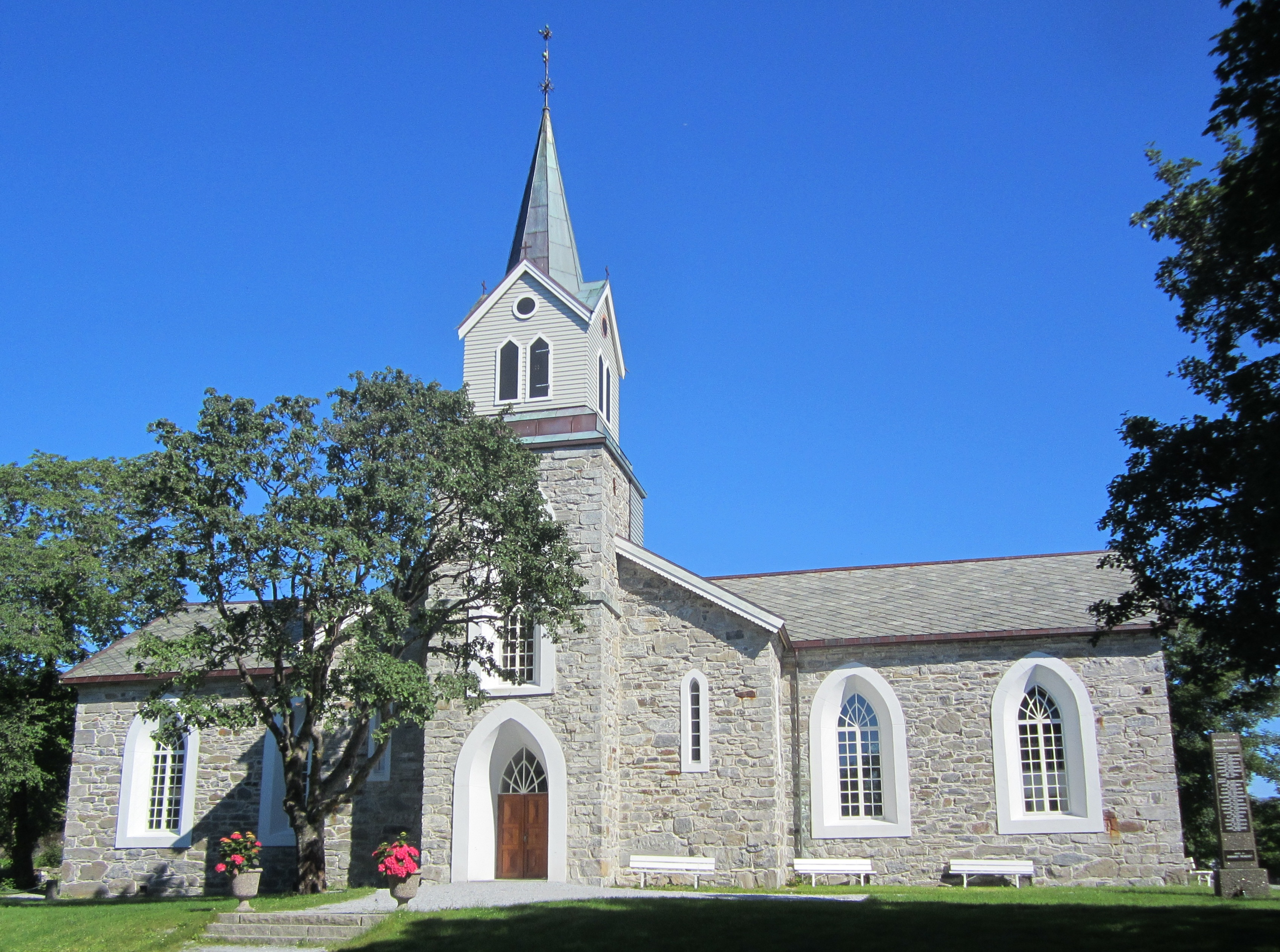
- View of the church
- Brønnøy Church
- 65.4688792°N 12.20638722°E
- Location: Brønnøy Municipality, Nordland
- Country: Norway
- Denomination: Church of Norway
- Churchmanship: Evangelical Lutheran

History
- Status: Parish church
- Founded: c. 1200
- Consecrated: 1870

Architecture
- Functional status: Active
- Architect: Håkon Mosling
- Architectural type: Cruciform
- Style: Neo-Gothic
- Completed: 1870 (156 years ago)

Specifications
- Capacity: 450
- Materials: Stone

Administration
- Diocese: Sør-Hålogaland
- Deanery: Sør-Helgeland prosti
- Parish: Brønnøy
- Norwegian Cultural Heritage Site
- Type: Church
- Status: Automatically protected
- ID: 83965

Brønnøy Church (Norwegian: Brønnøy kirke) is a parish church of the Church of Norway in Brønnøy Municipality in Nordland county, Norway. It is located in the town of Brønnøysund. It is the main church for the Brønnøy parish which is part of the Sør-Helgeland prosti (deanery) in the Diocese of Sør-Hålogaland. The brown, cruciform, stone church was built in a Neo-Gothic style in 1870 by the architect Haakon Mosling. The church seats about 450 people.

== History ==
The earliest existing historical records of the church date back to the year 1386, but the church was likely built around the year 1200 (end of the 12th century or early 13th century). There have been two church fires after lightning strikes on this site, the first in 1772 and the second in 1866. The original church had a rectangular nave with a narrower, almost square choir with a lower roof line. After the fire in 1772 the walls were repaired and an extension built to the north. Around 1800, the church received an extension to the south. After the second lightning strike in 1866, the church was heavily damaged by fire. It was decided to completely tear down the church and build a new church. In 1870, the present stone church building was built in a cross-shape, creating a cruciform layout. The organ was built by Claus Jensen (1817-1892) in 1879. It was restored by Br. Torkildsen Orgelbyggeri during 2006-2008 at which time the entire church underwent an extensive renovation.

== Gallery ==
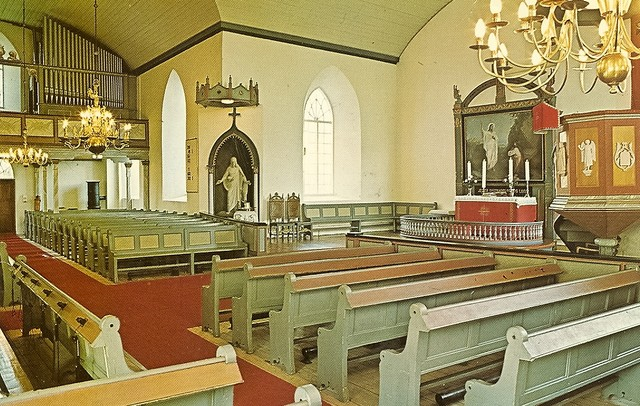
Brønnøy Church Sancruary

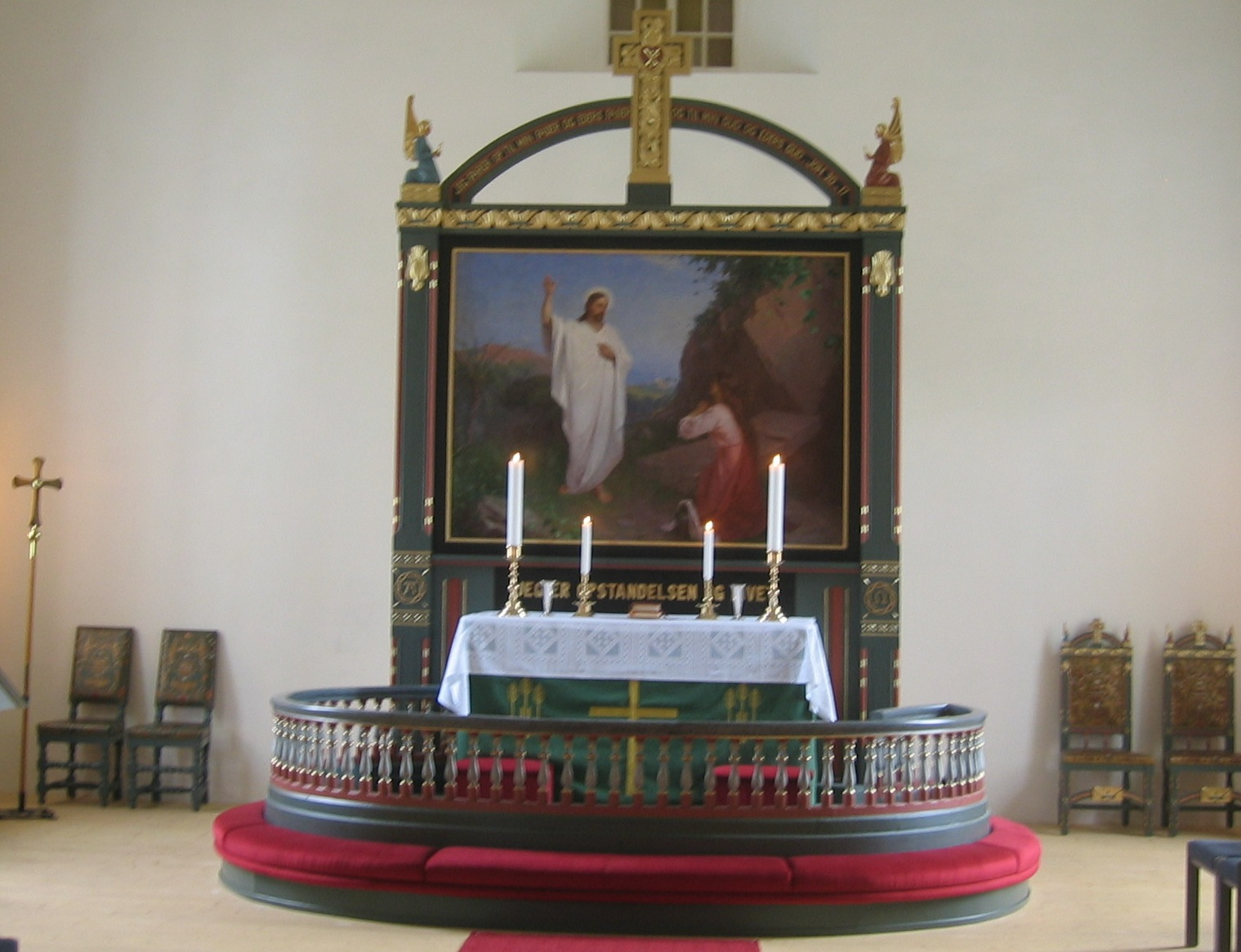
Brønnøy Church Altar

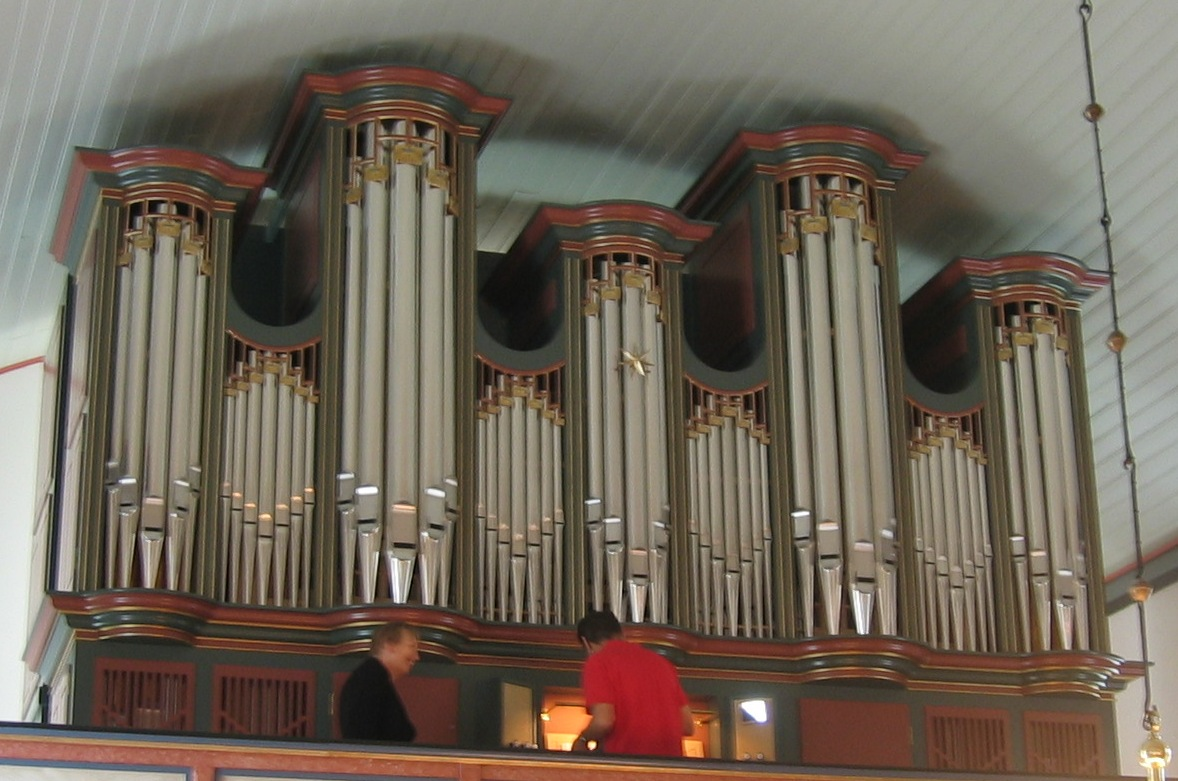
Brønnøy Church Main pipe organ

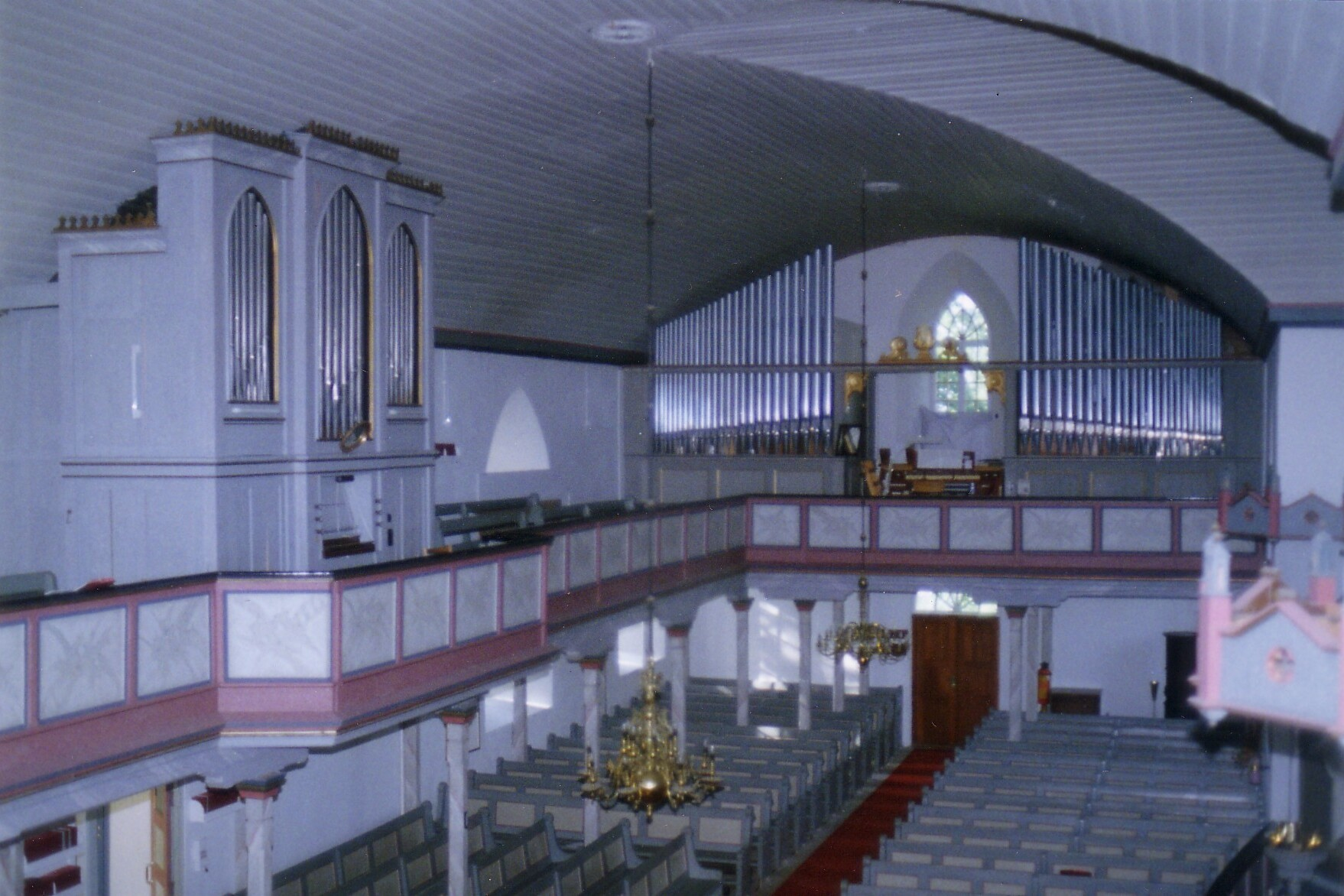
Brønnøy Church Loft

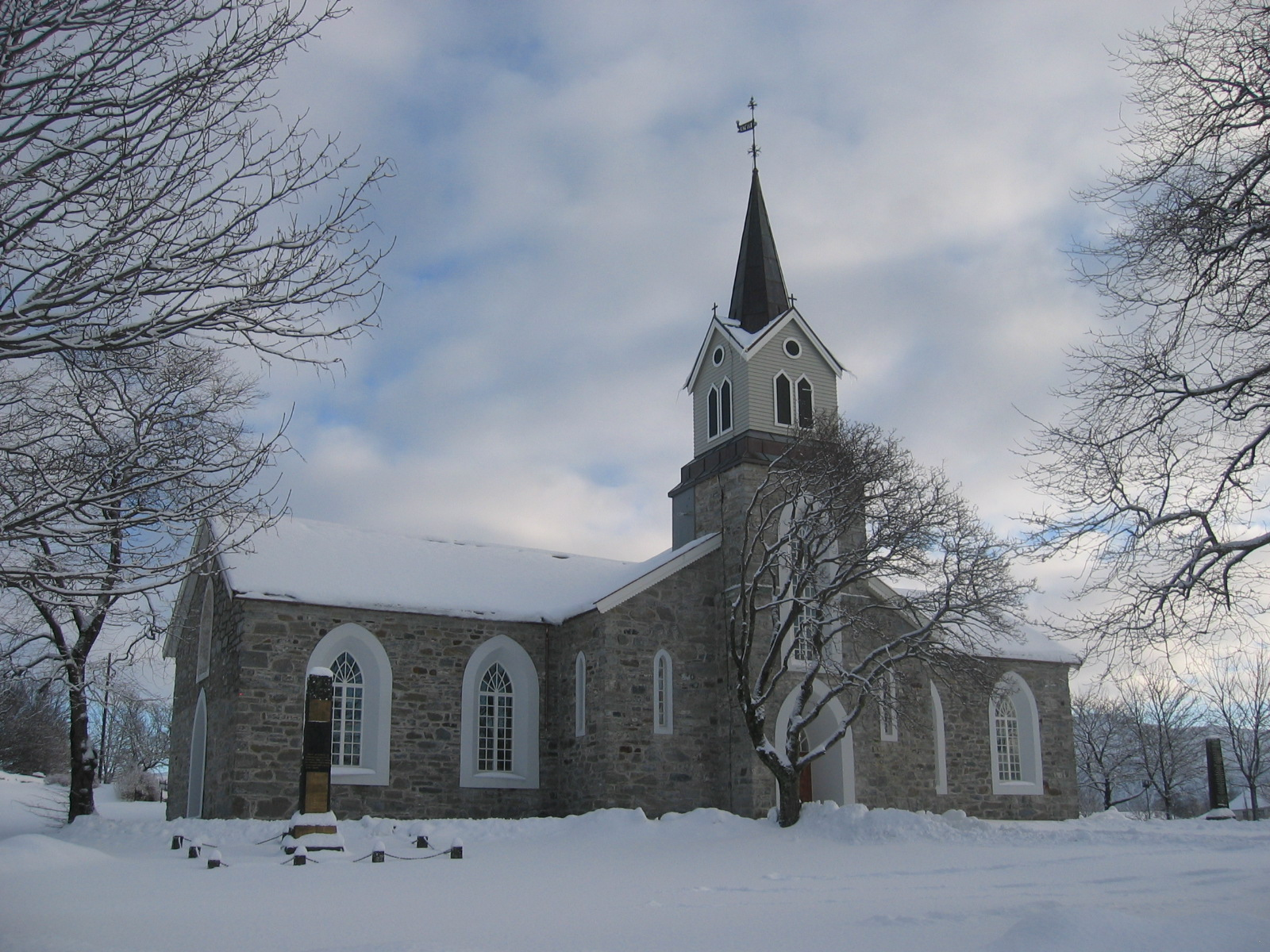
Brønnøy Church in winter

== See also ==
- List of churches in Sør-Hålogaland
