= Bjarne Fiskum =

Norwegian musical artist (1939–2021)

Bjarne Ivar Fiskum
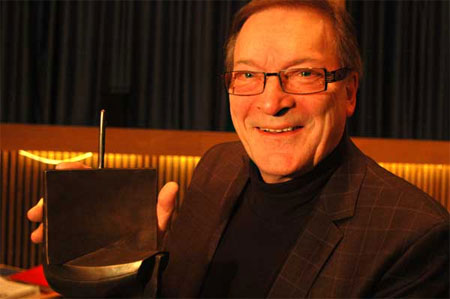
- Bjarne Fiskum with Nils Aas' sculpture that is awarded by "Nord-Trøndelag fylkes kulturpris".

Background information
- Born: 27 August 1939; Harran
- Origin: Norway
- Died: 30 August 2021 (aged 82)
- Genres: Classical
- Occupations: Musician and composer
- Instrument: Violin

Bjarne Ivar Fiskum (27 August 1939, Harran – 30 August 2021) was a Norwegian violinist, conductor and pedagogue.

== Career ==
After finishing his musical studies in Oslo, Stockholm, Vienna and Copenhagen, Fiskum was employed as violinist by Oslo Filharmoniske Orkester in 1960. There he made his debut as a soloist in 1965 and was 2nd concertmaster (1965–73). He established Det Norske Kammerorkester in 1977, and later became concertmaster for Trondheim Symphony Orchestra (1977–84). He was employed as Professor at Department of Music at the Trondheim Musikkonservatorium (1983–). Fiskum was also a teacher at the Heimdal Upper Secondary School for a while, and played within Hindarkvartetten and Trondheim Trio.

He founded the Trondheim Soloists in 1988, and was artistic director for them until 2001.

Bjarne Fiskum was son of the orchestra leader Ottar Fiskum.

== Honors ==
- Lindemanprisen 1995
- Order of St. Olav 2002
- Nord-Trøndelag fylkes kulturpris 2008, together with Trondheim Soloists

== Discography ==
- 2000: Franck, Valen, Palmar Johansen, Bjørklund (Sonor Records), together with Jørgen Larsen (piano) reciting the music of César Franck, Fartein Valen, Bertil Palmar Johansen & Terje Bjørklund.
- 2000: On A Spring String (Hemera Music), with Bertil Palmar Johansen (conductor) & "Trondheim Unge Strykere"
