= Grong Church =

Church in Trøndelag, Norway

- Grong kirke
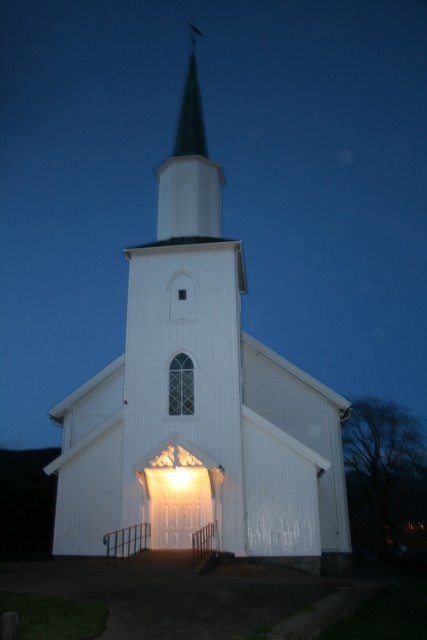
- View of the church
- Grong Church
- 64.46687917°N 12.29641691°E
- Location: Grong Municipality, Trøndelag
- Country: Norway
- Denomination: Church of Norway
- Churchmanship: Evangelical Lutheran

History
- Status: Parish church
- Founded: 12th century
- Consecrated: 14 Nov 1877

Architecture
- Functional status: Active
- Architect(s): Håkon Mosling and Jacob Wilhelm Nordan
- Architectural type: Long church
- Completed: 1876 (150 years ago)

Specifications
- Capacity: 260
- Materials: Wood

Administration
- Diocese: Nidaros bispedømme
- Deanery: Namdal prosti
- Parish: Grong
- Norwegian Cultural Heritage Site
- Type: Church
- Status: Listed
- ID: 84429

Grong Church (Norwegian: Grong kirke) is a parish church of the Church of Norway in Grong Municipality in Trøndelag county, Norway. It is located in the village of Medjå, on the north side of the river Namsen. It is the church for the Grong parish which is part of the Namdal prosti (deanery) in the Diocese of Nidaros. The white, wooden church was built in a long church style in 1876 using plans drawn up by the architects Håkon Mosling and Jacob Wilhelm Nordan. The church seats about 260 people.

== History ==
The earliest existing historical records of the church date back to the year 1520, but the crucifix in the church dates to the late-12th century, so the church may have been founded during that time period. The first church here was likely a stave church about 75 metres (246 ft) west of the present church site. An inspection report from 1679 mentions this church, calling it an "ancient church" built with staves, but that due to its age an condition, people were worried that it might fall over in a large storm. Because of this, the church was torn down in 1685 and a new timber-framed church was constructed on the same site that same year. In the mid-1800s, there was some discussion of either expanding the old church or replacing it. Finally, Håkon Mosling was hired to design a new church and the government's church architect, Jacob Wilhelm Nordan, amended Mosling's plans before construction could begin in an approval process that took a couple of years. In 1876, the new church was completed about 75 metres (246 ft) to the east of the old church. The new church was consecrated on 14 November 1877. The old church was no longer used after the new church was completed, but it stood next door to the new church until 1885 when the old church was torn down.

== See also ==
- List of churches in Nidaros
