= Grong Station =

Railway station in Grong, Norway

Grong Station Grong stasjon
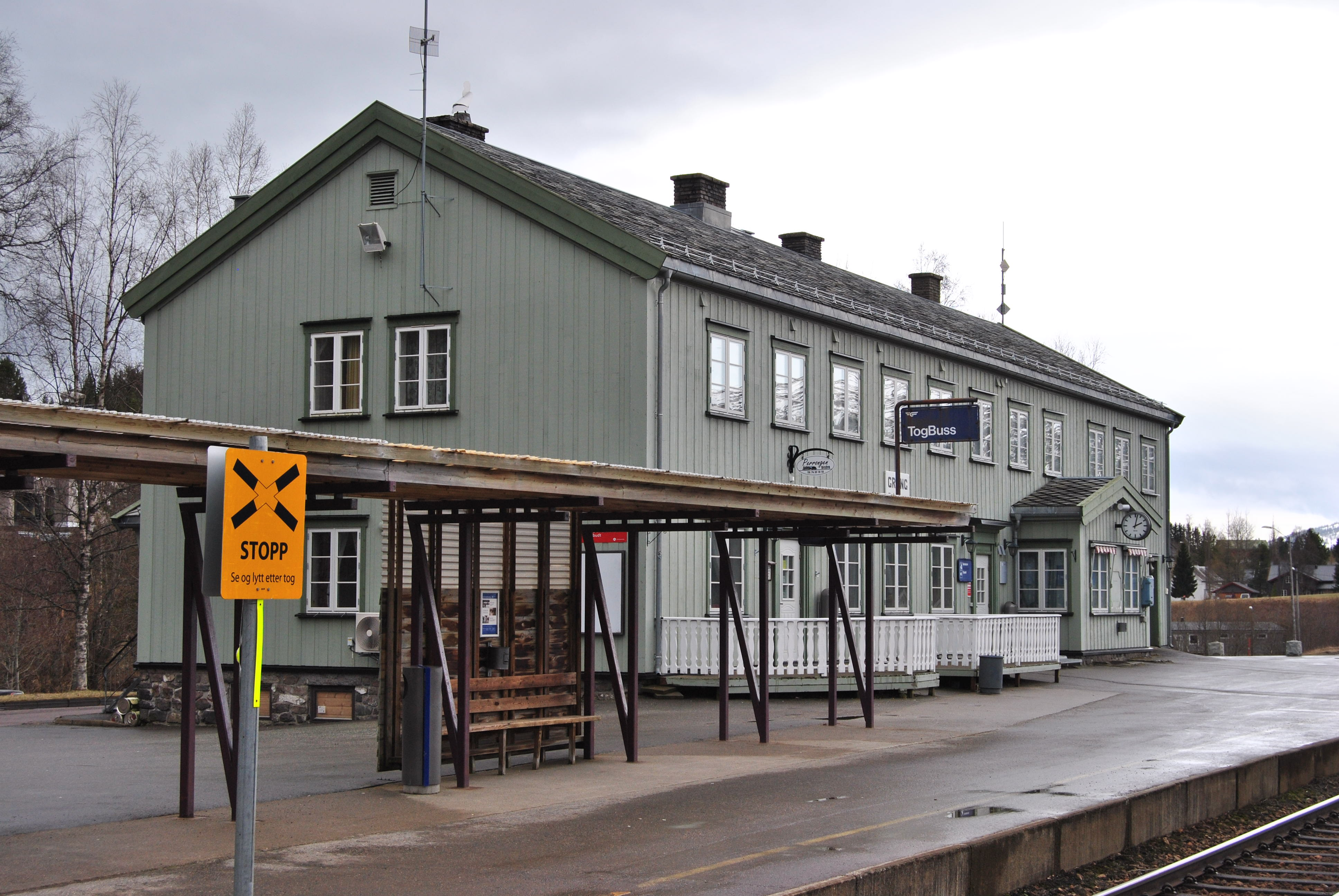
- View of the station

General information
- Location: Medjå, Grong Municipality; Trøndelag; Norway
- Coordinates: 64°27′30″N 12°20′13″E
- Elevation: 50.9 m (167 ft) above sea level
- System: Railway station
- Owner: Bane NOR
- Operator: SJ Norge
- Lines: Nordlandsbanen and Namsosbanen
- Distance: 219.54 km (136.42 mi)
- Connections: Bus: AtB

Construction
- Architect: Gudmund Hoel and Bjarne Friis Baastad

Other information
- Station code: GRG

History
- Opened: 30 November 1929
Location
- Location within Trøndelag Location within Norway

Grong Station (Norwegian: Grong stasjon) is a railway station located in the village of Grong in Grong Municipality in Trøndelag county, Norway. It is located on the Nordlandsbanen railway, and the station opened in 1929. Starting on 1 April 1942, the restaurant operations was taken over by Norsk Spisevognselskap. The station was the eastern terminus of the Namsos Line until that was closed in 2002.

Preceding station	Express trains	Following station
Snåsa towards Trondheim S	F7	Harran towards Bodø
