= Grong Municipality =

Municipality in Trøndelag, Norway

Grong Municipality Grong kommune Kråangken tjïelte (Southern Sami)
- Municipality
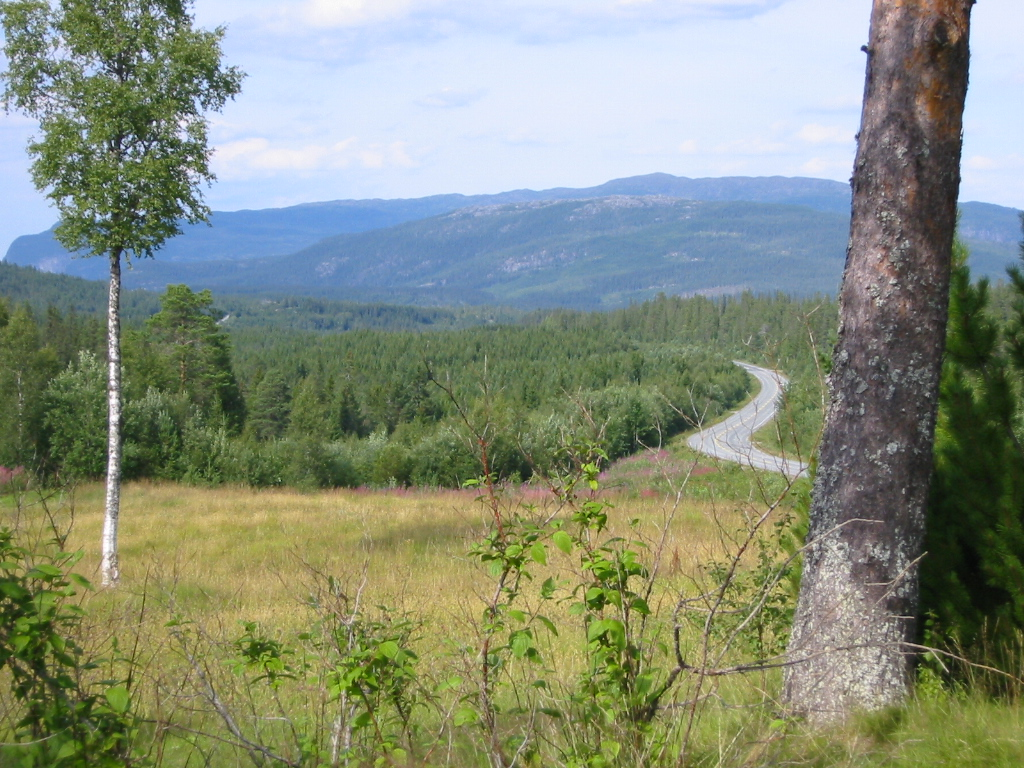
- Grong in early August 2007

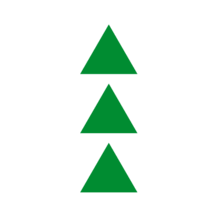
- Flag Coat of arms

- Trøndelag within Norway

- Grong within Trøndelag
- Coordinates: 64°31′53″N 12°37′12″E
- Country: Norway
- County: Trøndelag
- District: Namdalen
- Established: 1 Jan 1838
  - Created as: Formannskapsdistrikt
- Administrative centre: Medjå

Government
  - Mayor (2023): Ann Jeanett Klinkenberg (Ap)

Area
  - Total: 1,136.16 km^{2} (438.67 sq mi)
  - Land: 1,095.32 km^{2} (422.91 sq mi)
  - Water: 40.84 km^{2} (15.77 sq mi) 3.6%
  - Rank: #97 in Norway
- Highest elevation: 1,158.86 m (3,802.0 ft)

Population (2024)
  - Total: 2,322
  - Rank: #264 in Norway
  - Density: 2/km^{2} (5.2/sq mi)
  - Change (10 years): ▼ −5.2%
- Demonym: Grongning

Official language
  - Norwegian form: Neutral
- Time zone: UTC+01:00 (CET)
  - Summer (DST): UTC+02:00 (CEST)
- ISO 3166 code: NO-5045
- Website: Official website

Grong or Kråangke (Southern Sami) is a municipality in Trøndelag county, Norway. It is part of the Namdalen region. The administrative centre of the municipality is the village of Medjå (sometimes called Grong also). Other villages in the municipality include Bergsmoen, Formofoss, Gartland, and Harran.

The 1,136-square-kilometre (439 sq mi) municipality is the 97th largest by area out of the 357 municipalities in Norway. Grong Municipality is the 264th most populous municipality in Norway with a population of 2,322. The municipality's population density is 2 inhabitants per square kilometre (5.2/sq mi) and its population has decreased by 5.2% over the previous 10-year period.

== General information ==
Grong was established as a municipality on 1 January 1838 (see formannskapsdistrikt law). On 1 January 1901, the northwestern district of Grong (population: 1,046) was separated to form the new Høylandet Municipality. On 1 January 1923, the large Grong Municipality was divided into four smaller municipalities: Grong Municipality (population: 1,272) in the southwest, Harran Municipality (population: 630) in the centre, Røyrvik Municipality (population: 392) in the northeast, and Namsskogan Municipality (population: 469) in the northwest.

During the 1960s, there were many municipal mergers across Norway due to the work of the Schei Committee. On 1 January 1964, the neighboring Harran Municipality (population: 1,085) and Grong Municipality (population: 1,962) were merged (back together) to form a new, larger Grong Municipality.

On 1 January 2018, the municipality switched from the old Nord-Trøndelag county to the new Trøndelag county.

=== Name ===
The municipality (originally the parish) is named after the old Grong farm (Old Norse: Granungar) since the first Grong Church was built there. The first element is grǫn which means "spruce". The last element is the plural form of the suffix -ungr which is a common suffix for place names in Norway.

=== Coat of arms ===
The coat of arms was granted on 6 February 1987. The official blazon is "Argent, three triangles vert in pale" (Norwegian: I sølv tre grønne trekanter, 1-1-1). This means the arms have a field (background) that has a tincture of argent which means it is commonly colored white, but if it is made out of metal, then silver is used. The charge is three green triangles lined up vertically. The green triangles symbolize spruce trees (Norwegian: gran) which dominate almost 40% of the municipal areas. This makes them canting arms since the name of the municipality is supposedly derived from Granungar which means spruce. The number three symbolizes the three main villages in the municipality: Harran, Bergsmoen, and Medjå. The arms were designed by Einar H. Skjervold.

=== Churches ===
The Church of Norway has two parishes (sokn) within Grong Municipality. It is part of the Namdal prosti (deanery) in the Diocese of Nidaros.

Churches in Grong Municipality
| Parish (sokn) | Church name | Location of the church | Year built |
|---|---|---|---|
| Grong | Grong Church | Medjå | 1877 |
| Harran | Harran Church | Harran | 1874 |
| Harran | Gløshaug Church | Gartland | 1689 |

== Geography ==
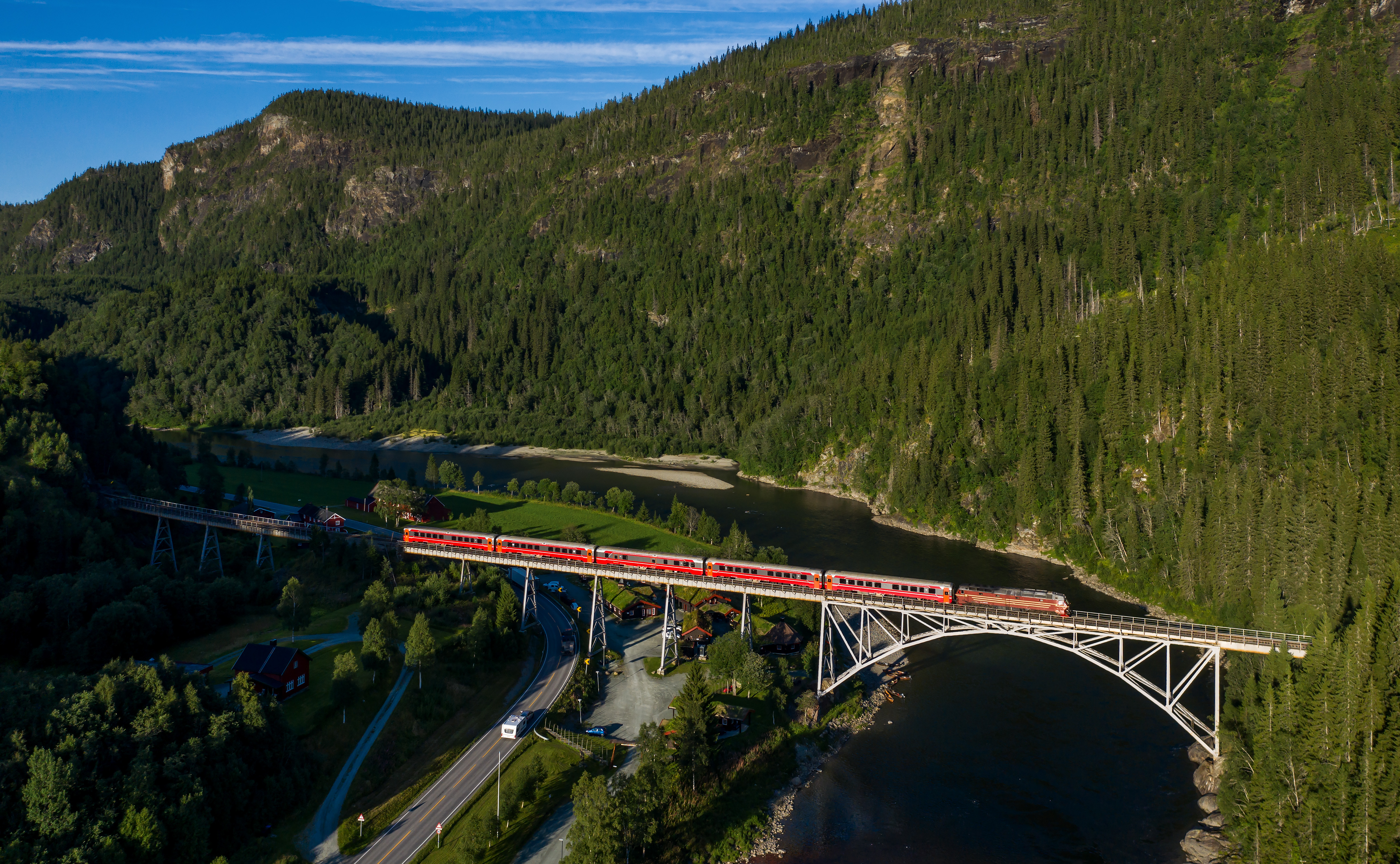
Nordlandsbanen train crossing Namsen river near Grong village

Grong is located along the river Namsen in the Namdalen valley. Two major tributaries of the Namsen flow through Grong too: the river Sanddøla and the river Neselva. The Bangsjøene lakes lie at the extreme southern border with Snåsa Municipality and Overhalla Municipality. The Blåfjella–Skjækerfjella National Park covers a small part of the southeastern part of Grong Municipality. The highest point in the municipality is the 1,158.86-metre (3,802.0 ft) tall mountain Heimdalhaugen.

== Government ==
Grong Municipality is responsible for primary education (through 10th grade), outpatient health services, senior citizen services, welfare and other social services, zoning, economic development, and municipal roads and utilities. The municipality is governed by a municipal council of directly elected representatives. The mayor is indirectly elected by a vote of the municipal council. The municipality is under the jurisdiction of the Trøndelag District Court and the Frostating Court of Appeal.

Municipal waste management has since 1979 been handled by the inter-municipal Midtre Namdal Avfallsselskap, with ReTrans Midt handling waste collection since 2018.

=== Municipal council ===
The municipal council (Kommunestyre) of Grong Municipality is made up of 17 representatives that are elected to four year terms. The tables below show the current and historical composition of the council by political party.

Grong kommunestyre 2023–2027
| Party name (in Norwegian) | Number of representatives |
|---|---|
| Labour Party (Arbeiderpartiet) | 6 |
| Conservative Party (Høyre) | 2 |
| Centre Party (Senterpartiet) | 8 |
| Socialist Left Party (Sosialistisk Venstreparti) | 1 |
| Total number of members: | 17 |

Grong kommunestyre 2019–2023
| Party name (in Norwegian) | Number of representatives |
|---|---|
| Labour Party (Arbeiderpartiet) | 5 |
| Green Party (Miljøpartiet De Grønne) | 1 |
| Conservative Party (Høyre) | 1 |
| Centre Party (Senterpartiet) | 9 |
| Socialist Left Party (Sosialistisk Venstreparti) | 1 |
| Total number of members: | 17 |

Grong kommunestyre 2015–2019
| Party name (in Norwegian) | Number of representatives |
|---|---|
| Labour Party (Arbeiderpartiet) | 9 |
| Conservative Party (Høyre) | 1 |
| Centre Party (Senterpartiet) | 5 |
| Socialist Left Party (Sosialistisk Venstreparti) | 2 |
| Total number of members: | 17 |

Grong kommunestyre 2011–2015
| Party name (in Norwegian) | Number of representatives |
|---|---|
| Labour Party (Arbeiderpartiet) | 7 |
| Conservative Party (Høyre) | 2 |
| Centre Party (Senterpartiet) | 7 |
| Socialist Left Party (Sosialistisk Venstreparti) | 1 |
| Total number of members: | 17 |

Grong kommunestyre 2007–2011
| Party name (in Norwegian) | Number of representatives |
|---|---|
| Labour Party (Arbeiderpartiet) | 4 |
| Conservative Party (Høyre) | 1 |
| Centre Party (Senterpartiet) | 9 |
| Socialist Left Party (Sosialistisk Venstreparti) | 2 |
| Liberal Party (Venstre) | 1 |
| Total number of members: | 17 |

Grong kommunestyre 2003–2007
| Party name (in Norwegian) | Number of representatives |
|---|---|
| Labour Party (Arbeiderpartiet) | 5 |
| Centre Party (Senterpartiet) | 8 |
| Socialist Left Party (Sosialistisk Venstreparti) | 3 |
| Liberal Party (Venstre) | 1 |
| Total number of members: | 17 |

Grong kommunestyre 1999–2003
| Party name (in Norwegian) | Number of representatives |
|---|---|
| Labour Party (Arbeiderpartiet) | 7 |
| Conservative Party (Høyre) | 1 |
| Centre Party (Senterpartiet) | 8 |
| Socialist Left Party (Sosialistisk Venstreparti) | 4 |
| Liberal Party (Venstre) | 1 |
| Total number of members: | 21 |

Grong kommunestyre 1995–1999
| Party name (in Norwegian) | Number of representatives |
|---|---|
| Labour Party (Arbeiderpartiet) | 6 |
| Conservative Party (Høyre) | 1 |
| Centre Party (Senterpartiet) | 10 |
| Socialist Left Party (Sosialistisk Venstreparti) | 3 |
| Liberal Party (Venstre) | 1 |
| Total number of members: | 21 |

Grong kommunestyre 1991–1995
| Party name (in Norwegian) | Number of representatives |
|---|---|
| Labour Party (Arbeiderpartiet) | 6 |
| Conservative Party (Høyre) | 1 |
| Centre Party (Senterpartiet) | 9 |
| Socialist Left Party (Sosialistisk Venstreparti) | 4 |
| Liberal Party (Venstre) | 1 |
| Total number of members: | 21 |

Grong kommunestyre 1987–1991
| Party name (in Norwegian) | Number of representatives |
|---|---|
| Labour Party (Arbeiderpartiet) | 7 |
| Conservative Party (Høyre) | 2 |
| Centre Party (Senterpartiet) | 6 |
| Socialist Left Party (Sosialistisk Venstreparti) | 4 |
| Liberal Party (Venstre) | 2 |
| Total number of members: | 21 |

Grong kommunestyre 1983–1987
| Party name (in Norwegian) | Number of representatives |
|---|---|
| Labour Party (Arbeiderpartiet) | 10 |
| Conservative Party (Høyre) | 2 |
| Centre Party (Senterpartiet) | 7 |
| Liberal Party (Venstre) | 2 |
| Total number of members: | 21 |

Grong kommunestyre 1979–1983
| Party name (in Norwegian) | Number of representatives |
|---|---|
| Labour Party (Arbeiderpartiet) | 10 |
| Conservative Party (Høyre) | 2 |
| Centre Party (Senterpartiet) | 7 |
| Liberal Party (Venstre) | 2 |
| Total number of members: | 21 |

Grong kommunestyre 1975–1979
| Party name (in Norwegian) | Number of representatives |
|---|---|
| Labour Party (Arbeiderpartiet) | 9 |
| Conservative Party (Høyre) | 2 |
| Centre Party (Senterpartiet) | 7 |
| Socialist Left Party (Sosialistisk Venstreparti) | 1 |
| Liberal Party (Venstre) | 2 |
| Total number of members: | 21 |

Grong kommunestyre 1971–1975
| Party name (in Norwegian) | Number of representatives |
|---|---|
| Labour Party (Arbeiderpartiet) | 10 |
| Conservative Party (Høyre) | 1 |
| Centre Party (Senterpartiet) | 7 |
| Liberal Party (Venstre) | 3 |
| Total number of members: | 21 |

Grong kommunestyre 1967–1971
| Party name (in Norwegian) | Number of representatives |
|---|---|
| Labour Party (Arbeiderpartiet) | 12 |
| Conservative Party (Høyre) | 2 |
| Centre Party (Senterpartiet) | 8 |
| Socialist People's Party (Sosialistisk Folkeparti) | 3 |
| Liberal Party (Venstre) | 4 |
| Total number of members: | 29 |

Grong kommunestyre 1963–1967
| Party name (in Norwegian) | Number of representatives |
|---|---|
| Labour Party (Arbeiderpartiet) | 15 |
| Conservative Party (Høyre) | 2 |
| Centre Party (Senterpartiet) | 8 |
| Liberal Party (Venstre) | 4 |
| Total number of members: | 29 |
Note: On 1 January 1964, Harran Municipality became part of Grong Municipality.

Grong herredsstyre 1959–1963
| Party name (in Norwegian) | Number of representatives |
|---|---|
| Labour Party (Arbeiderpartiet) | 9 |
| Joint List(s) of Non-Socialist Parties (Borgerlige Felleslister) | 8 |
| Total number of members: | 17 |

Grong herredsstyre 1955–1959
| Party name (in Norwegian) | Number of representatives |
|---|---|
| Labour Party (Arbeiderpartiet) | 8 |
| Communist Party (Kommunistiske Parti) | 1 |
| Farmers' Party (Bondepartiet) | 5 |
| Liberal Party (Venstre) | 1 |
| Local List(s) (Lokale lister) | 2 |
| Total number of members: | 17 |

Grong herredsstyre 1951–1955
| Party name (in Norwegian) | Number of representatives |
|---|---|
| Labour Party (Arbeiderpartiet) | 8 |
| Communist Party (Kommunistiske Parti) | 1 |
| Farmers' Party (Bondepartiet) | 4 |
| Liberal Party (Venstre) | 3 |
| Total number of members: | 16 |

Grong herredsstyre 1947–1951
| Party name (in Norwegian) | Number of representatives |
|---|---|
| Labour Party (Arbeiderpartiet) | 7 |
| Communist Party (Kommunistiske Parti) | 1 |
| Liberal Party (Venstre) | 3 |
| Local List(s) (Lokale lister) | 5 |
| Total number of members: | 16 |

Grong herredsstyre 1945–1947
| Party name (in Norwegian) | Number of representatives |
|---|---|
| Labour Party (Arbeiderpartiet) | 7 |
| Communist Party (Kommunistiske Parti) | 2 |
| Liberal Party (Venstre) | 3 |
| Local List(s) (Lokale lister) | 4 |
| Total number of members: | 16 |

Grong herredsstyre 1937–1941*
| Party name (in Norwegian) | Number of representatives |
|---|---|
| Labour Party (Arbeiderpartiet) | 8 |
| Liberal Party (Venstre) | 3 |
| Local List(s) (Lokale lister) | 5 |
| Total number of members: | 16 |
Note: Due to the German occupation of Norway during World War II, no elections were held for new municipal councils until after the war ended in 1945.

=== Mayors ===
The mayor (Norwegian: ordfører) of Grong is the political leader of the municipality and the chairperson of the municipal council. Here is a list of people who have held this position:

- 1838–1839: Jørgen Darre Strand
- 1840–1843: Søren Rasmussen Eugenius Sørensen
- 1844–1847: Peder Jakobsen Almås
- 1847–1851: Lorents Mediå
- 1852–1853: Elias Iversen Urstad
- 1854–1855: Peder Jakobsen Almås
- 1856–1859: Lorents Mediå
- 1860–1863: Knut Flått
- 1864–1867: Lorents Mediå
- 1868–1871: Hans Fredrik Thoresen
- 1872–1879: Svend Matthiesen (V)
- 1880–1883: Knut Flått
- 1884–1887: Lorents Mørkved (V)
- 1888–1891: Hans Seem (V)
- 1892–1907: Svend Matthiesen (V)
- 1908–1910: Hans Seem (V)
- 1911–1919: Ole Mørkved (V)
- 1920–1928: Oluf Moe (V)
- 1929–1934: Martin Bjerken (V)
- 1934–1935: John Solli (Ap)
- 1936–1937: Ole L. Haugen (Ap)
- 1938–1945: Anders O. Seem (NS)
- 1945–1945: Iver Tømmerås (Bp)
- 1945–1945: Johannes Tømmerås (V)
- 1946–1947: Ole L. Haugen (Ap)
- 1948–1951: Ivar Moe (Bp)
- 1952–1955: Håkon Letvik (Ap)
- 1956–1959: Torfinn Haugum (Bp)
- 1960–1971: Håkon Letvik (Ap)
- 1972–1982: Agnar Gartland (Sp)
- 1982–1983: Oluf Moe (H)
- 1984–1985: Finn Jørgensen (Ap)
- 1986–1987: Bo Pettersen (V)
- 1988–1991: Finn Jørgensen (Ap)
- 1992–1999: Torbjørn Østerås (Sp)
- 1999–2003: Helge Formo (Ap)
- 2003–2011: Erik Seem (Sp)
- 2011–2019: Skjalg Åkerøy (Ap)
- 2019–2023: Borgny Grande (Sp)
- 2023–present: Ann Jeanett Klinkenberg (Ap)

== Transportation ==
The European route E6 highway follows the river Namsen across the municipality, as does the Nordland Line. The two main stations on the Nordland Line are Grong Station in Medjå and Harran Station in Harran. The old Namsos Line railway used to run from Grong to Namsos, but that is now closed.

== Notable people ==
- Bjarne Fiskum (born 1939 in Harran), a violinist, conductor, and composer
- Maja Dunfjeld (born 1947), a South Sami researcher and duodji craftswoman who lives in Harran
- Ellinor Jåma (born 1979), a Norwegian-Sami politician
- Line Viken (born 1981) & Stian Saugestad (born 1992), alpine skiers representing the sports club Grong IL

== Media gallery ==
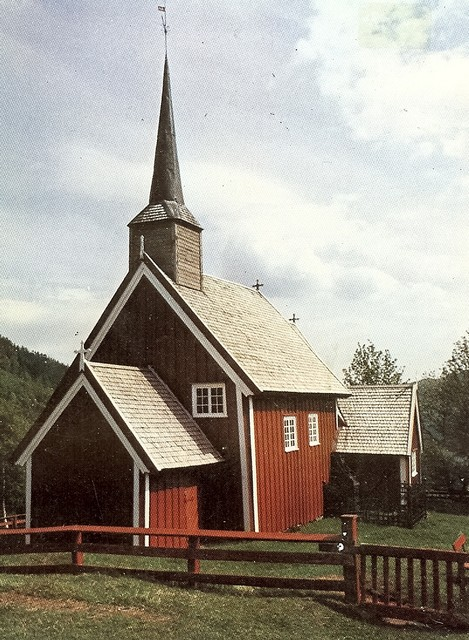
The old Gløshaug church in Gartland

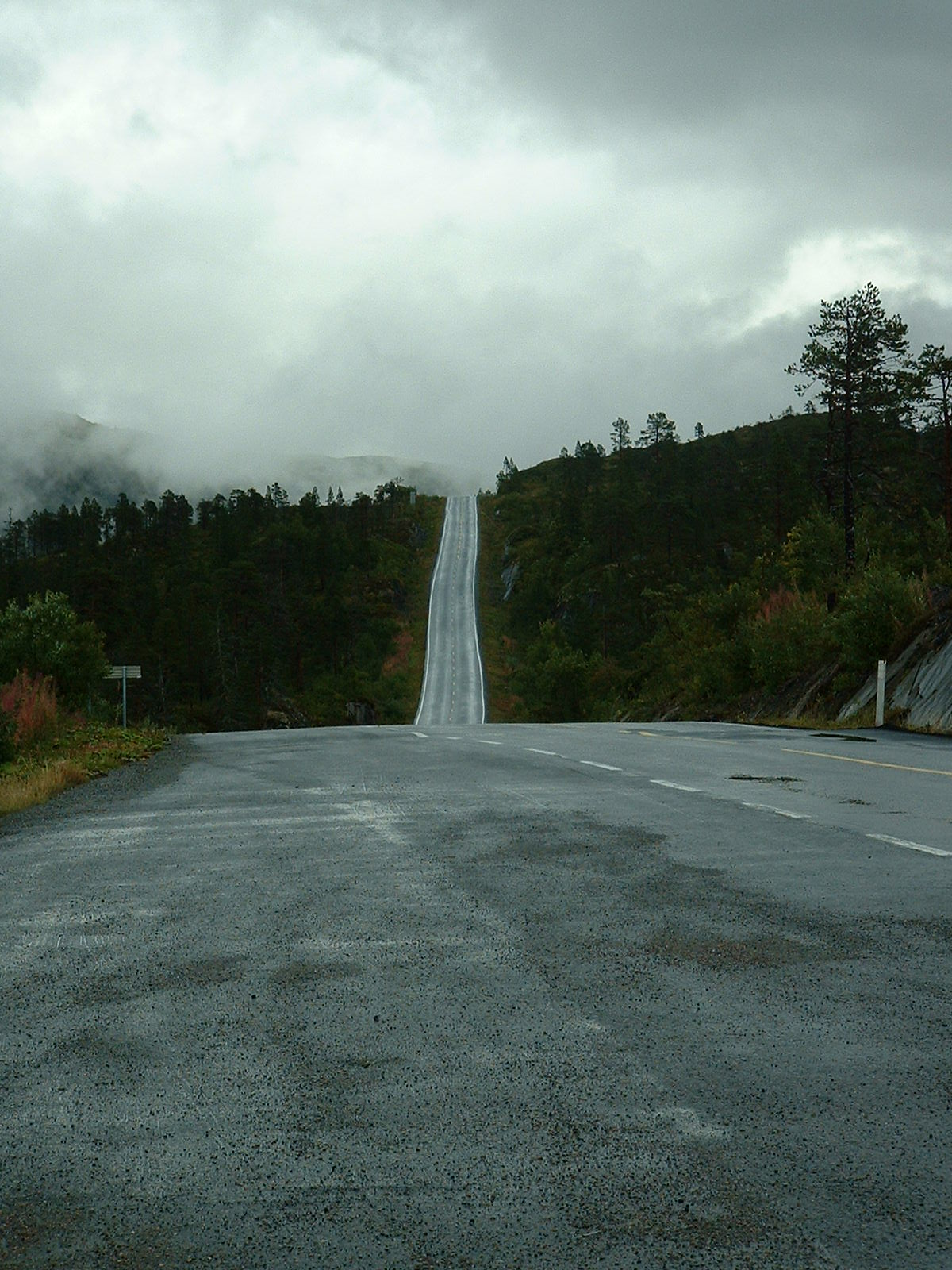
County road from Grong to Sweden

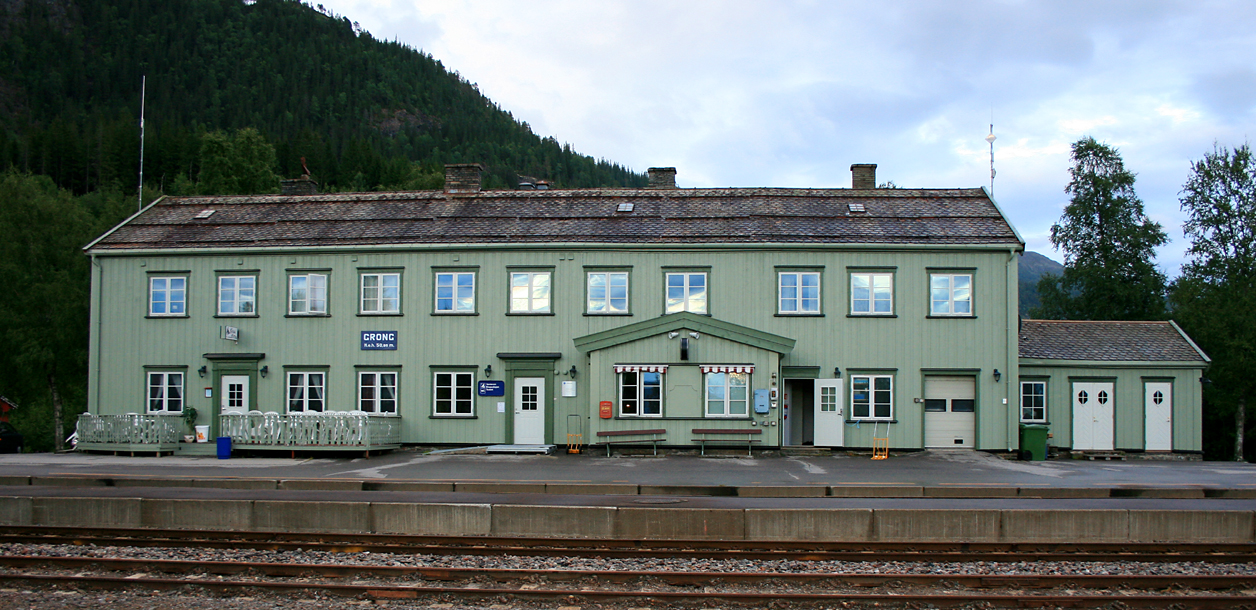
Train station in Grong

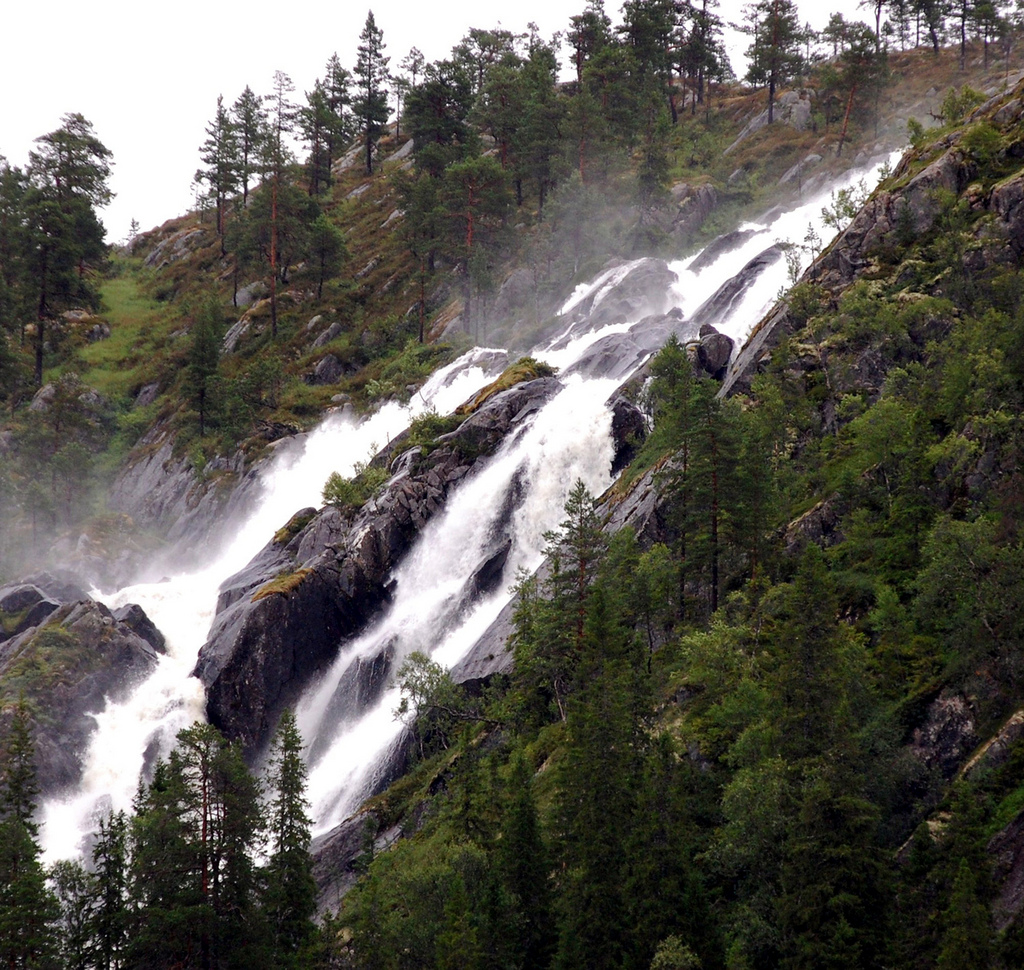
Foss i Grong
