= Harran Church =

Church in Trøndelag, Norway

- Harran kirke
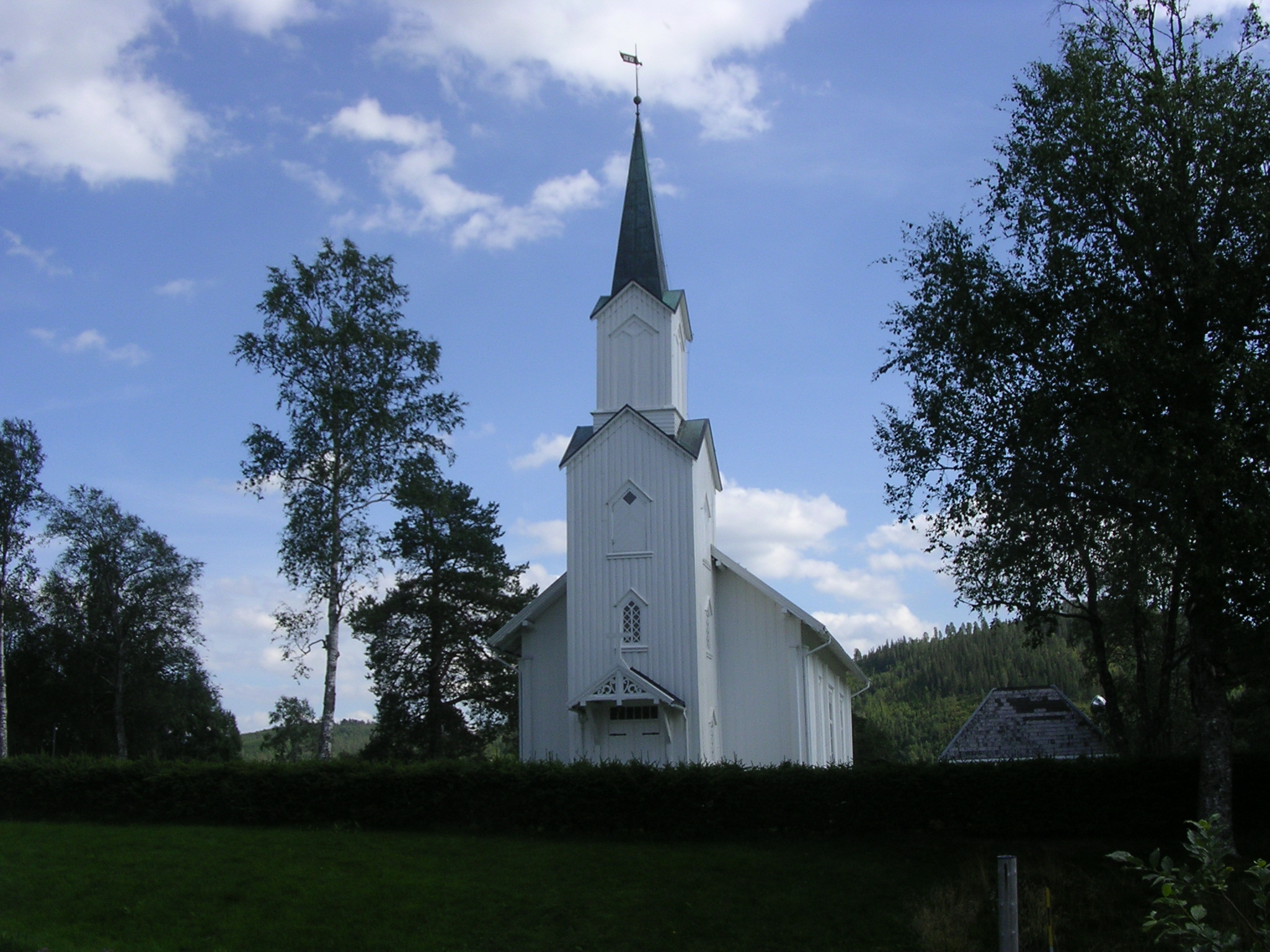
- View of the church
- Harran Church
- 64.55922703°N 12.48651042°E
- Location: Grong Municipality, Trøndelag
- Country: Norway
- Denomination: Church of Norway
- Churchmanship: Evangelical Lutheran

History
- Status: Parish church
- Founded: 1874
- Consecrated: 30 Sept 1874

Architecture
- Functional status: Active
- Architect: Jacob Wilhelm Nordan
- Architectural type: Long church
- Completed: 1874 (152 years ago)

Specifications
- Capacity: 200
- Materials: Wood

Administration
- Diocese: Nidaros bispedømme
- Deanery: Namdal prosti
- Parish: Harran
- Norwegian Cultural Heritage Site
- Type: Church
- Status: Not protected
- ID: 84485

Harran Church (Norwegian: Harran kirke) is a parish church of the Church of Norway in Grong Municipality in Trøndelag county, Norway. It is located in the village of Harran. It is the main church for the Harran parish which is part of the Namdal prosti (deanery) in the Diocese of Nidaros. The white, wooden church was built in a long church style in 1874 using plans drawn up by the architect Jacob Wilhelm Nordan. The church seats about 200 people. The church was built to replace the old Gløshaug Church which was getting to be too small and in need of repair. The church was consecrated on 30 September 1874.

== Media gallery ==
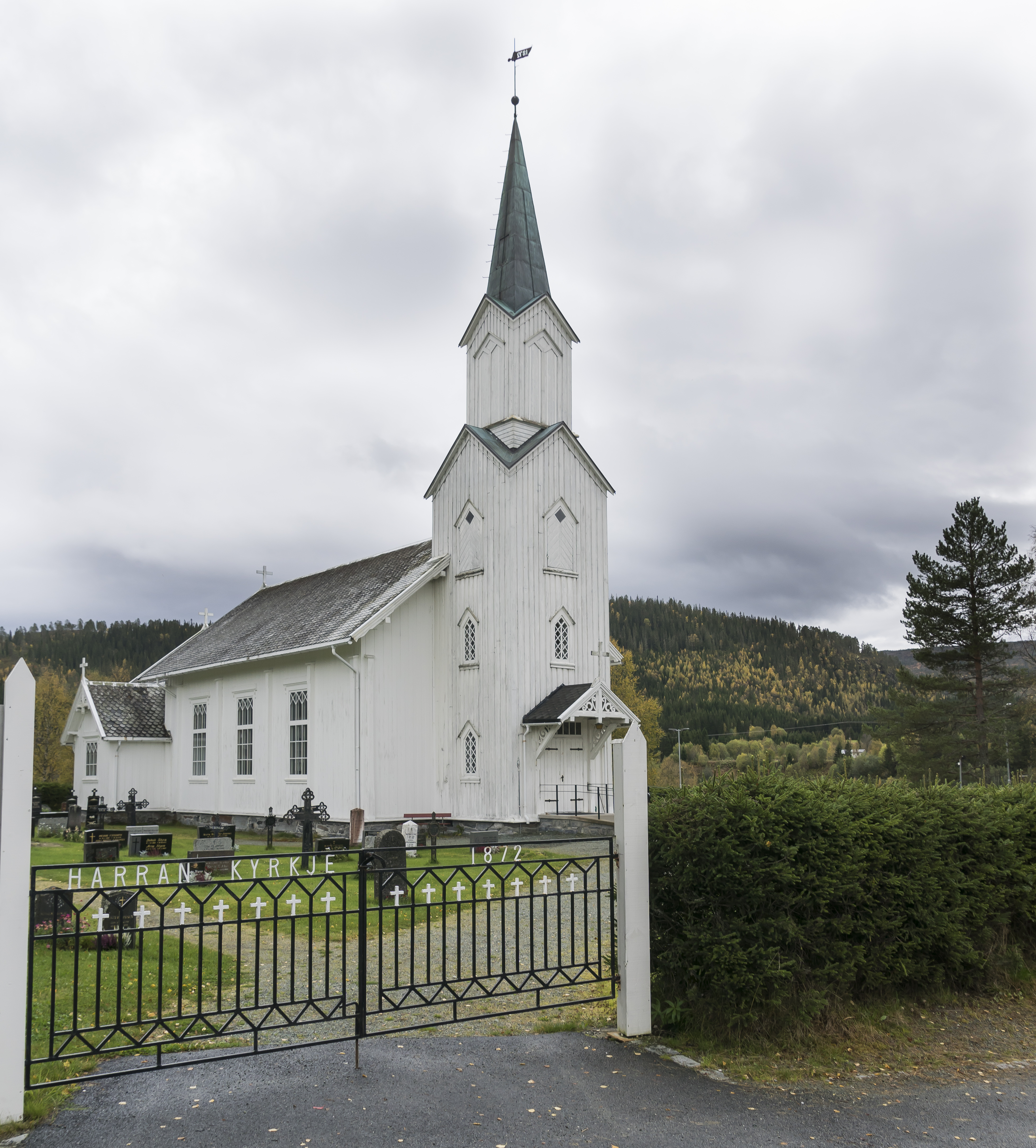

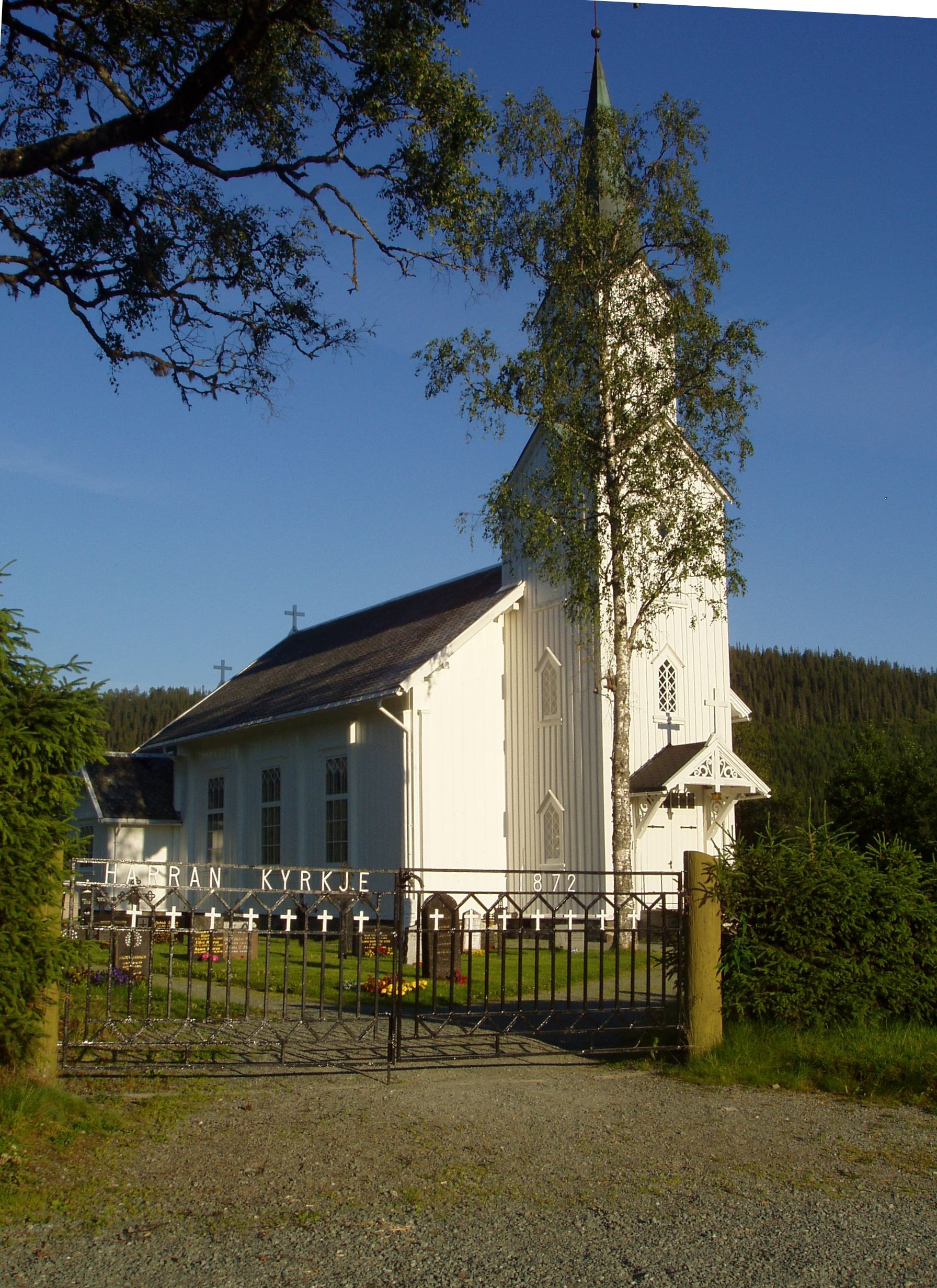

== See also ==
- List of churches in Nidaros
