= Medjå =

Village in Grong Municipality, Norway

Grong Medjå
- Village
- Interactive map of Grong; Medjå
- Location within Trøndelag Location within Norway
- Coordinates: 64.4637°N 12.3156°E
- Country: Norway
- Region: Central Norway
- County: Trøndelag
- District: Namdalen
- Municipality: Grong Municipality

Area
  - Total: 1.13 km^{2} (0.44 sq mi)
- Elevation: 28 m (92 ft)

Population (2024)
  - Total: 1,090
  - Density: 965/km^{2} (2,500/sq mi)
- Time zone: UTC+01:00 (CET)
  - Summer (DST): UTC+02:00 (CEST)
- Post Code: 7870 Grong

Medjå or Grong is a village which serves as the administrative center of Grong Municipality in Trøndelag county, Norway. It is located along the river Namsen, at the confluence with the river Sanddøla. The Nordland Line railway runs along the eastern part of the village, stopping at Grong Station. The European route E6 highway runs through the western edge of the village. Grong Church, the main church for the area, is also located in this village.

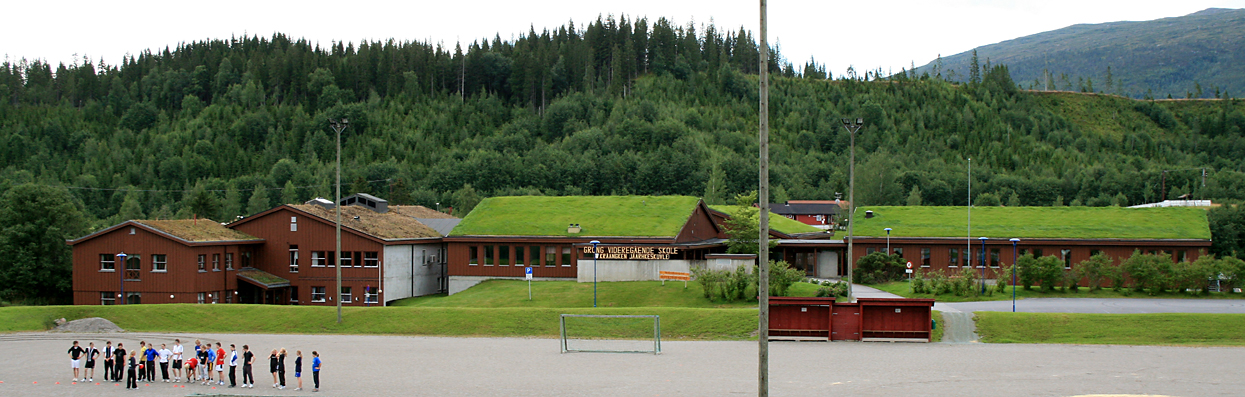
Grong School

The 1.13-square-kilometre (280-acre) village has a population (2024) of 1,090 and a population density of 965 inhabitants per square kilometre (2,500/sq mi).
