= Namdalen =

Traditional region in Trøndelag, Norway

Coordinates: 64.3667°N 12.9167°E

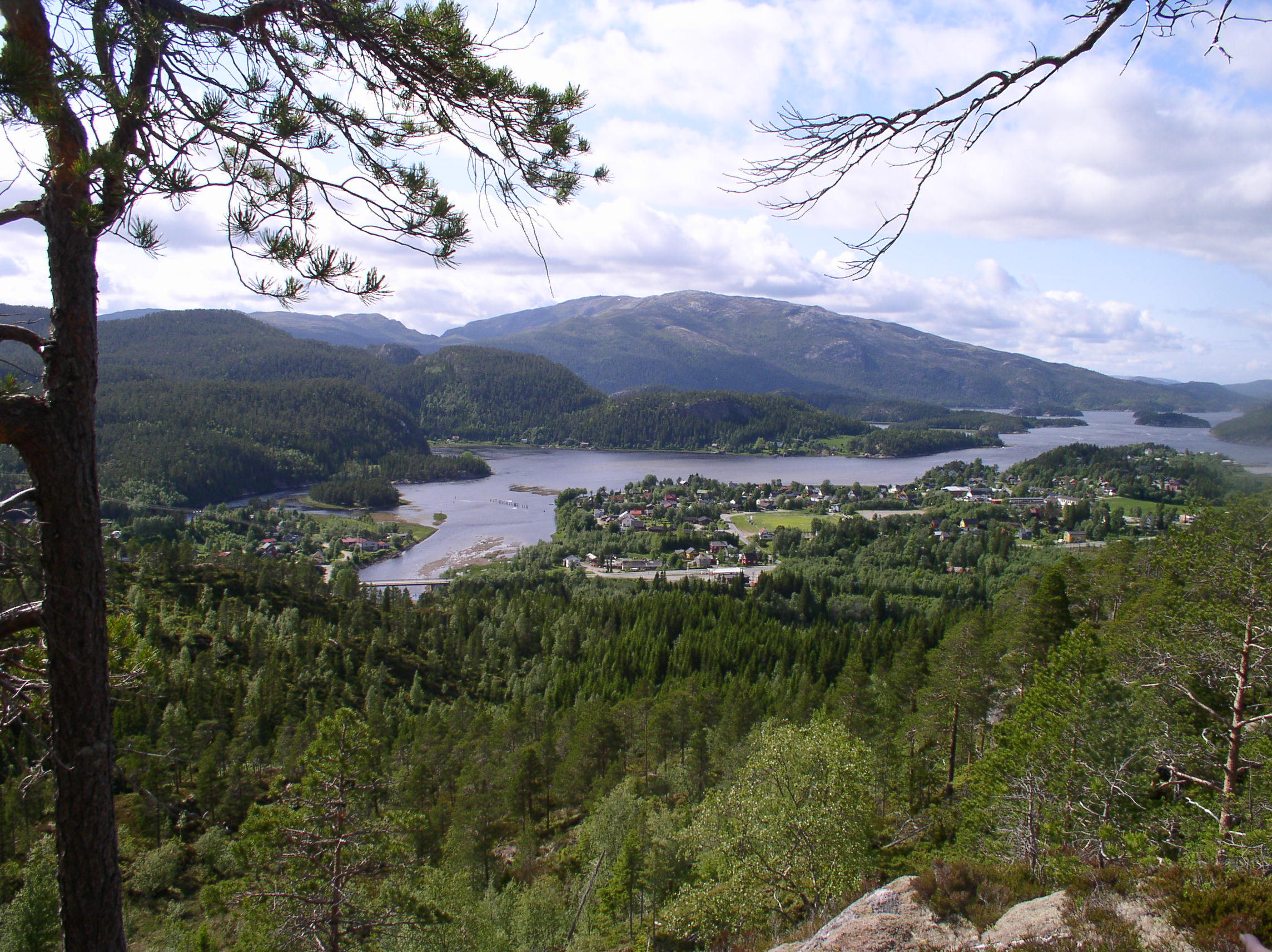
Bangsund near Namsos

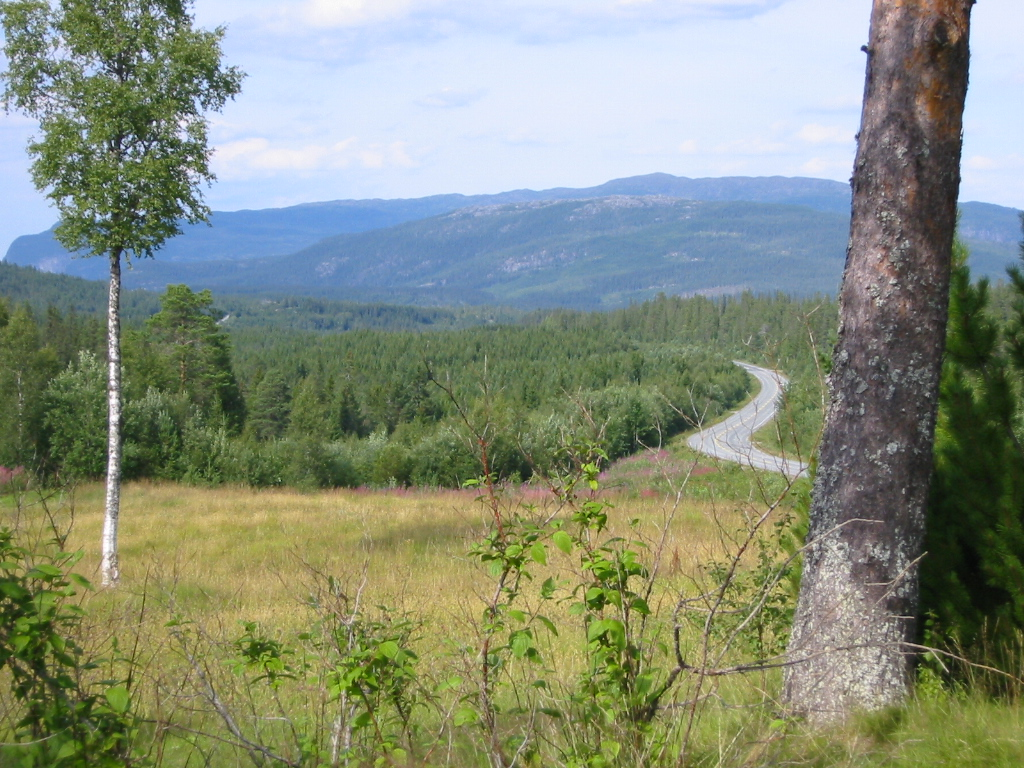
Heia in Grong Municipality; the E6 road follows Namdalen for about 100 km

Namdalen (Southern Sami: Nååmesjevuemie) is a traditional district in the central part of Norway, consisting of the municipalities of Namsos, Grong, Overhalla, Røyrvik, Nærøysund, Høylandet, Flatanger, Lierne, Leka, and Namsskogan, all in Trøndelag county. The district has three towns: Namsos, Rørvik and Kolvereid. The whole district covers about 11,860 square kilometres (4,580 sq mi) and has about 35,000 residents (2009).

The district surrounds the Namdalen valley and the river Namsen, one of the best salmon rivers in Europe (only the Tana river in Finnmark yields a larger catch of salmon). Agriculture and forestry have always been important in Namdalen. Norway spruce is the most prevalent tree species. The grain fields in the lower part of the valley are among the most northern in Norway. Part of the forest in the coastal and lowland part of the valley belong to the Scandinavian coastal conifer forests type, while the upper part of the valley has long and cold winters.

In the early Viking Age, before Harald Fairhair, Namdalen was a petty kingdom. The former Namdal District Court covered the same general area. European route E6 and the Nordland Line run throughout the valley.

== Name ==
The Old Norse form of the name was Naumudalr. The first element is the genitive case of the river name Nauma (now Namsen) and the last element is dalr which means "valley" or "dale". The meaning of the river name is unknown.

== Namdalen in Literature ==
Namdalen is the location of many of the stories of Olav Duun, a well-known early twentieth century Norwegian author. His most famous works, the hexalogy known as The People of Juvik (Juvikfolket), takes place on the fictional farm of Haaberg, as well as other locations in Namdalen.
