= Øysletta =

Village in Overhalla Municipality, Norway

- Village
- Interactive map of Øysletta
- Location within Trøndelag Location within Norway
- Coordinates: 64.4621°N 12.0557°E
- Country: Norway
- Region: Central Norway
- County: Trøndelag
- District: Namdalen
- Municipality: Overhalla Municipality
- Elevation: 16 m (52 ft)
- Time zone: UTC+01:00 (CET)
  - Summer (DST): UTC+02:00 (CEST)
- Post Code: 7863 Overhalla

Øysletta is a village in Overhalla Municipality in Trøndelag county, Norway. It is located on the south shore of the river Namsen, along the now-defunct Namsos Line railway. The municipal center, Ranemsletta lies about 7.5 kilometres (4.7 mi) to the northwest and the municipal border with Grong Municipality lies about 3 kilometres (1.9 mi) east of Øysletta.

== Viking ship discovery ==
A geo-radar survey revealed in 2019 the presence of a group of Viking ship burials, the most significant of which appears to be over 8 metres (26 ft) long. Due to the COVID-19 pandemic, excavations were delayed until 2023, and will last for years. This is the first find of ship burials since the excavation of the Oseberg Ship in the early 1900s–the archetype of the Viking ship and the centrepiece of the Viking Ship Museum in Oslo.
