= Gunhild Følstad =

Norwegian footballer (born 1981)

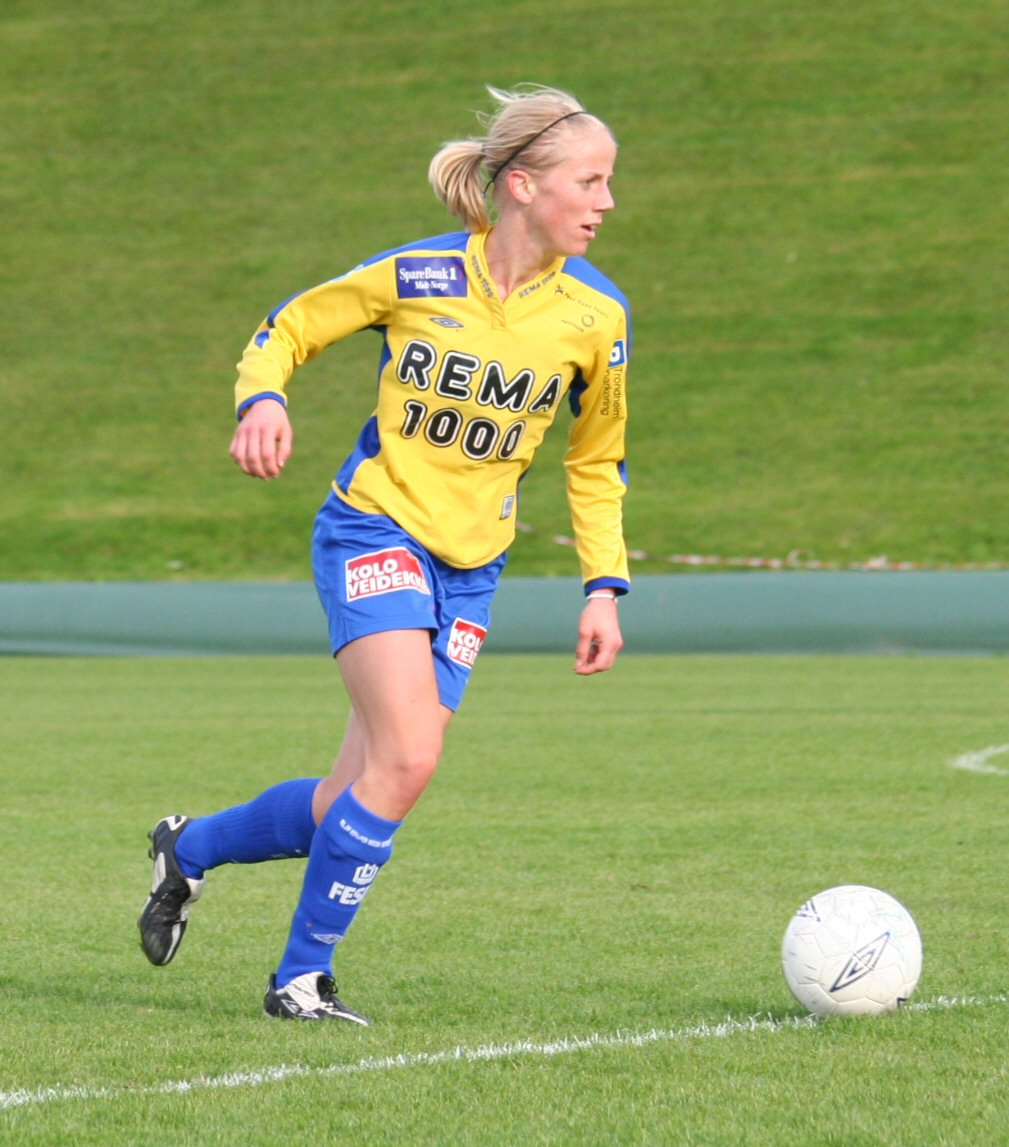

Personal information
- Full name: Gunhild Bentzen Følstad
- Date of birth: 3 November 1981 (age 44)
- Place of birth: Namsos, Norway
- Height: 1.72 m (5 ft 8 in)
- Position: Defender

Youth career
- Overhalla IL

Senior career*
Years	Team	Apps	(Gls)
2000–2008	Trondheims-Ørn		

International career^{‡}
2002–2008	Norway	76	(1)
- * Club domestic league appearances and goals ‡ National team caps and goals as of 6 September 2008

Gunhild Bentzen Følstad (born 3 November 1981) is a Norwegian former football defender from Overhalla Municipality (near Namsos). The daughter of a football trainer, she played for Trondheims-Ørn and the Norway women's national football team, making 76 appearances. She is a qualified physiotherapist and her hobbies are skiing, reading and music.

Følstad captained Norway in one match against China in the Four-Nations Tournament in Guangzhou in January 2006. In a match played in pouring rain China won 3-1.

She played as a central defender for Trondheims-Ørn and also featured as a right-back and left-back in the national team.

At the 2007 Women's World Cup in China in September 2007 Følstad played in matches watched by 50,000 spectators. Norway finished the tournament in 4th place.

On 9 June 2008 she was named to the Norwegian roster for the 2008 Summer Olympics to be held in Beijing, China. On 6 August 2008, as a left-back in an attacking position, she provided the pass for the 1–0 goal by Leni Larsen Kaurin in Norway's 2–0 defeat of the United States in Qinhuangdao, which was then the quickest goal in the history of the tournament. The team reached the quarter finals where they lost to Brazil.

Gunhild Følstad announced her retirement from football at the end of 2008 to pursue her career as a physiotherapist in Namsos. Her partner is Hallvard Wågheim; their first child, a son, was born in Skage on 16 May 2010.

== International goals ==
Scores and results list Norway's goal tally first.

#	Date	Venue	Opponent	Result	Competition	Scored
1	10 May 2006	Storstadion, Sandefjord	Serbia	3–0	2007 FIFA World Cup Qual.	1
