= Hunn, Norway =

Village in Overhalla Municipality, Norway

Hunn Skage (historic name)
- Village
- Interactive map of Hunn
- Location within Trøndelag Location within Norway
- Coordinates: 64.4675°N 11.7564°E
- Country: Norway
- Region: Central Norway
- County: Trøndelag
- District: Namdalen
- Municipality: Overhalla Municipality

Area
  - Total: 0.58 km^{2} (0.22 sq mi)
- Elevation: 15 m (49 ft)

Population (2024)
  - Total: 853
  - Density: 1,471/km^{2} (3,810/sq mi)
- Time zone: UTC+01:00 (CET)
  - Summer (DST): UTC+02:00 (CEST)
- Post Code: 7860 Skage i Namdalen

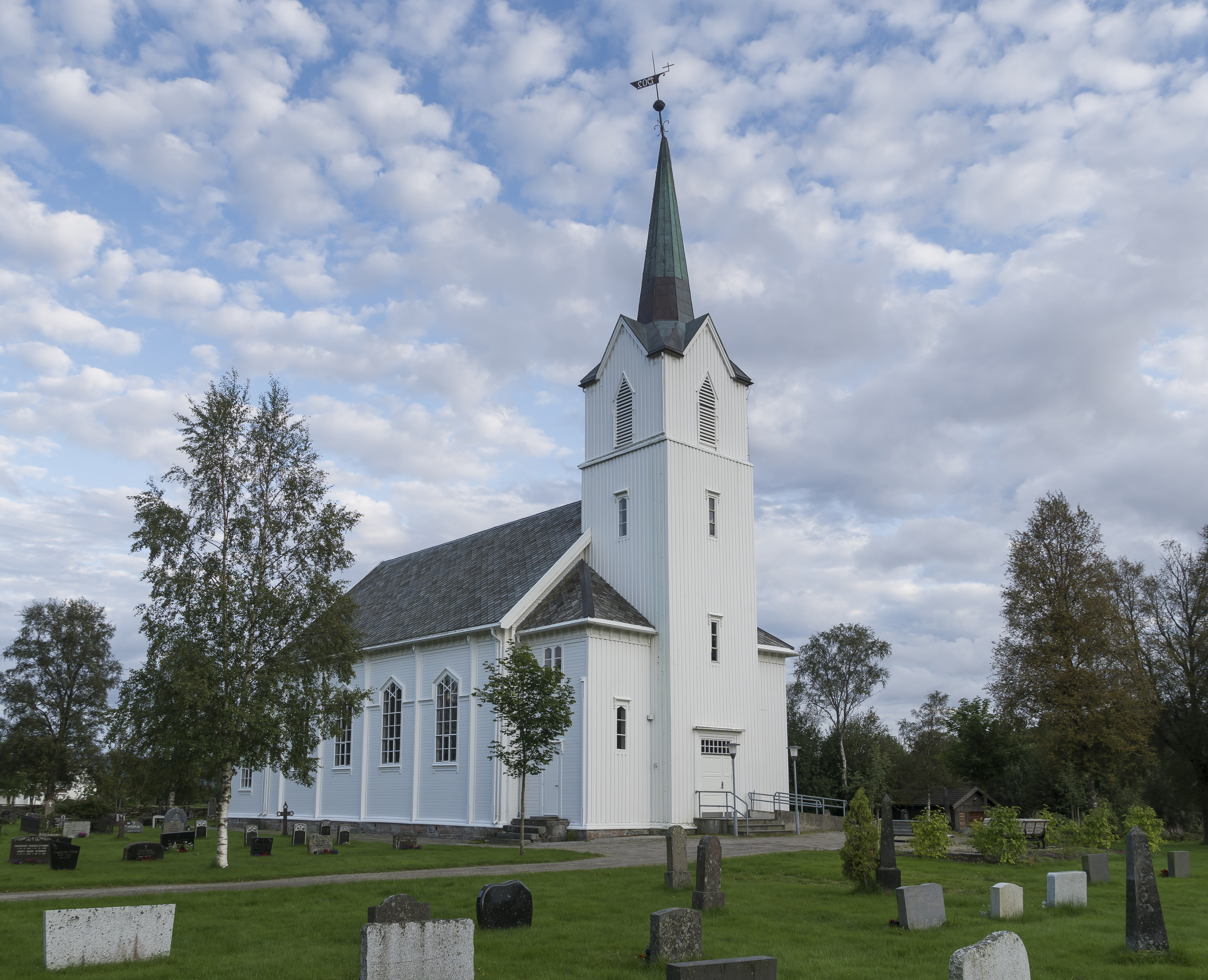
Skage church

Hunn (or historically Skage) is a village in Overhalla Municipality in Trøndelag county, Norway. It is located on the northern shore of the river Namsen, about 10 kilometres (6.2 mi) west of the municipal center, Ranemsletta, and about 15 kilometres (9.3 mi) east of the town of Namsos.

The village lies along the Norwegian County Road 17. The now-defunct Namsos Line railway ran through this village. Skage Church is also located in this village.

The 0.58-square-kilometre (140-acre) village has a population (2024) of 853 and a population density of 1,471 inhabitants per square kilometre (3,810/sq mi).
