= Skage Church =

Church in Trøndelag, Norway

- Skage kirke
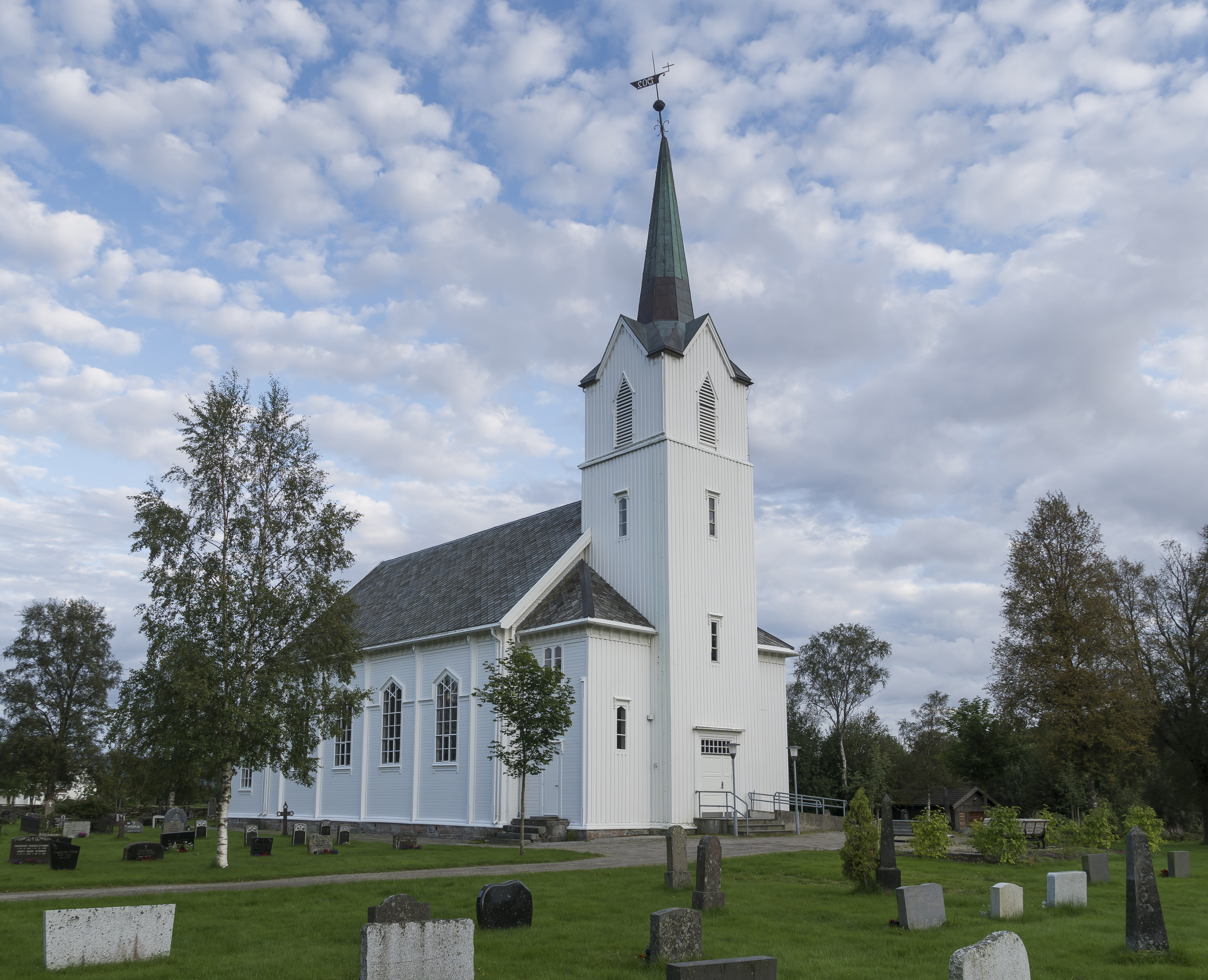
- View of the church
- Skage Church
- 64.46396617°N 11.75631791°E
- Location: Overhalla Municipality, Trøndelag
- Country: Norway
- Denomination: Church of Norway
- Churchmanship: Evangelical Lutheran

History
- Former name: Hunn kirke
- Status: Parish church
- Founded: 12th century
- Consecrated: 16 Dec 1903

Architecture
- Functional status: Active
- Architect: Ole Scheistrøen
- Architectural type: Long church
- Style: Neo-Gothic
- Completed: 1903 (123 years ago)

Specifications
- Capacity: 330
- Materials: Wood

Administration
- Diocese: Nidaros bispedømme
- Deanery: Namdal prosti
- Parish: Skage
- Norwegian Cultural Heritage Site
- Type: Church
- Status: Listed
- ID: 85442

Skage Church (Norwegian: Skage kirke) is a parish church of the Church of Norway in Overhalla Municipality in Trøndelag county, Norway. It is located in the village of Hunn. It is the church for the Skage parish which is part of the Namdal prosti (deanery) in the Diocese of Nidaros. The white, wooden, Neo-Gothic church was built in a long church style in 1903 using plans drawn up by the architect Ole Scheistrøen. The church seats about 330 people.

== History ==
The earliest existing historical records of the church date back to the year 1432, but the church was not new that year. The original stave church on this site was built a few meters south of the present church, probably during the 12th century. The church historically was called Hunn Church, after the farm on which it was located. Around the 15th century, the name was changed to Skage Church, after the more prominent neighboring farm. During the middle of the 1600s, the small stave church was remodeled with a small addition to the west to increase the capacity of the building. In 1726, the old church was torn down and a new log building was constructed on the same site. In 1903, the old church was torn down and a new church was constructed a few meters to the north of the old site. The new church was consecrated on 16 December 1903.

== See also ==
- List of churches in Nidaros
