= Johannes Rian =

Norwegian painter (1891–1981)

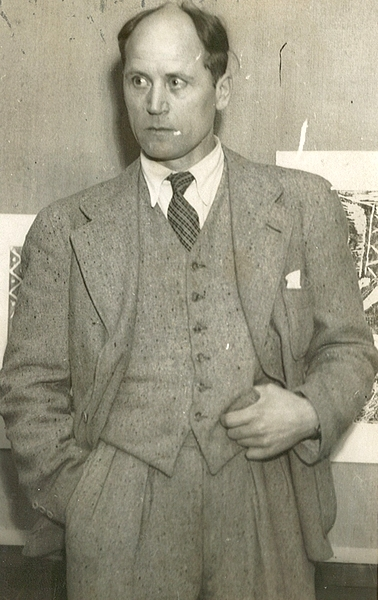
Johannes Rian, c. 1938

Johannes "Johs" Rian (17 May 1891 – 10 December 1981) was a Norwegian painter.

Johs Rian was born in Overhalla Municipality in Nordre Trondheim, Norway. He was a son of farmers Peter Rian (1856–1934) and Elen Blengslien (1864–1952). He also worked at the family farm, but left this career in 1927 to pursue painting. He studied at the Norwegian National Academy of Fine Arts from 1928 to 1930 under Axel Revold. He was also inspired by Henrik Sørensen, and Revold's teacher Henri Matisse. In 1936 he married his secretary Ellen Gjønnæs (1903–1961). In 1950, Rian was provided with a Thomas Fearnley Memorial Scholarship and traveled to the south of France.

Rian exhibited at the contemporary art gallery Kunstnerforbundet in Oslo several times between 1930 and 1957, and also at the São Paulo Biennal in 1967/68. From 1960 he mainly exhibited at Galleri Haaken in Oslo. He also started painting nonfigurative art. The Norwegian Museum of Contemporary Art owns eight of his paintings. He was decorated with the Royal Norwegian Order of St. Olav in 1978 and died in 1981 at Oslo.

== Selected works ==
- Pike med katt, 1932
- Lekselesing, 1946
- Dame med sort katt, 1946
- Côte d'Azur, 1950
- Rødt interiør, 1950
- Damen med celloen, 1950
- Blått atelier, 1953
- Nonnespeilet, 1961
- Dekorasjon, 1966
- Former på blå bunn, 1967
