= Susanne Bratli =

Norwegian politician (born 1966)

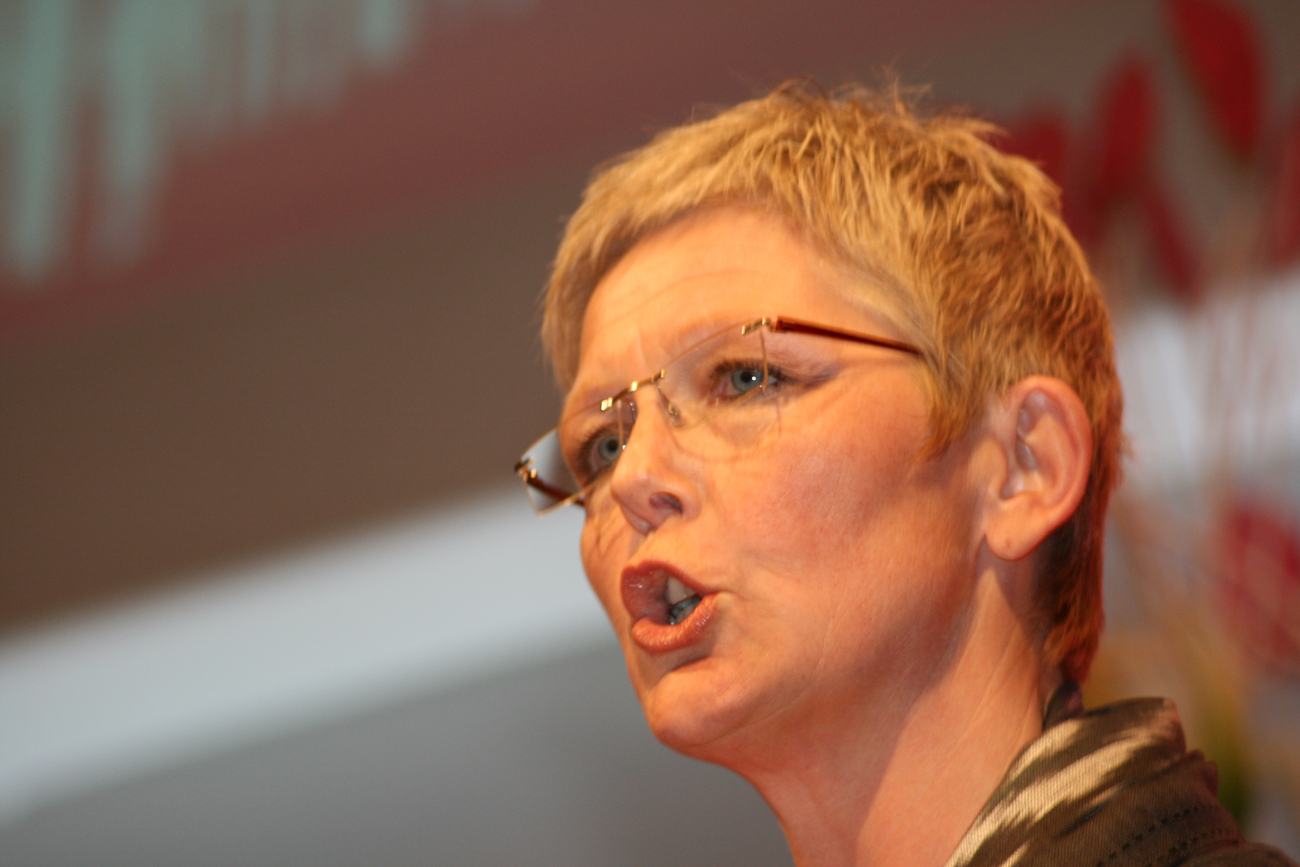

Member of the Norwegian Parliament for Nord-Trøndelag
- In office 2009–2013

Personal details
- Born: Susanne Andersson; 10 June 1966 (age 60)
- Party: Labour Party
- Occupation: Sales clerk

Susanne Bratli (born 10 June 1966) is a Norwegian politician for the Labour Party. She was a member of parliament for Nord-Trøndelag from 2009 to 2013.

Bratli was born of Olle Andersson and Frøydis Rebnord. She went to Namsos Primary and Lower Secondary School from 1973 to 1982, and took general studies at Namsos Upper Secondary School from 1982 to 1985. She worked as a sales clerk at the hardware store Bygger'n in Grong Municipality from 1985 to 1996.

She was leader of Overhalla Labour Party from 1989 to 1994, and was a member of the municipal council of Overhalla Municipality for three terms from 1991 to 2003, the last eight years as a member of the executive board. She was leader of Nord-Trøndelag Labour Party from 1995 to 1997, and sat on the central board of the Norwegian Labour Party from 1996 to 2000. She was elected to Nord-Trøndelag County Council in 1995, and was re-elected on three occasions. She worked as the group secretary from 1998 to 2003, when she was appointed councilor of commerce, transport and the environment in the county cabinet. Following the 2007 election, she became councilor of regional development. From 1 May to 1 November 2003, she was mayor of Overhalla. From 2001 to 2006, she was chair of the Norwegian Council for Road Safety.

Bratli was elected to the parliament following the 2009 election as the Labour Party's third representative from Nord-Trøndelag. She sat on the Standing Committee on Transport and Communications and on the Election Committee. She lost her seat in the 2013 election.
