= Eidsvatnet =

Lake in Trøndelag, Norway

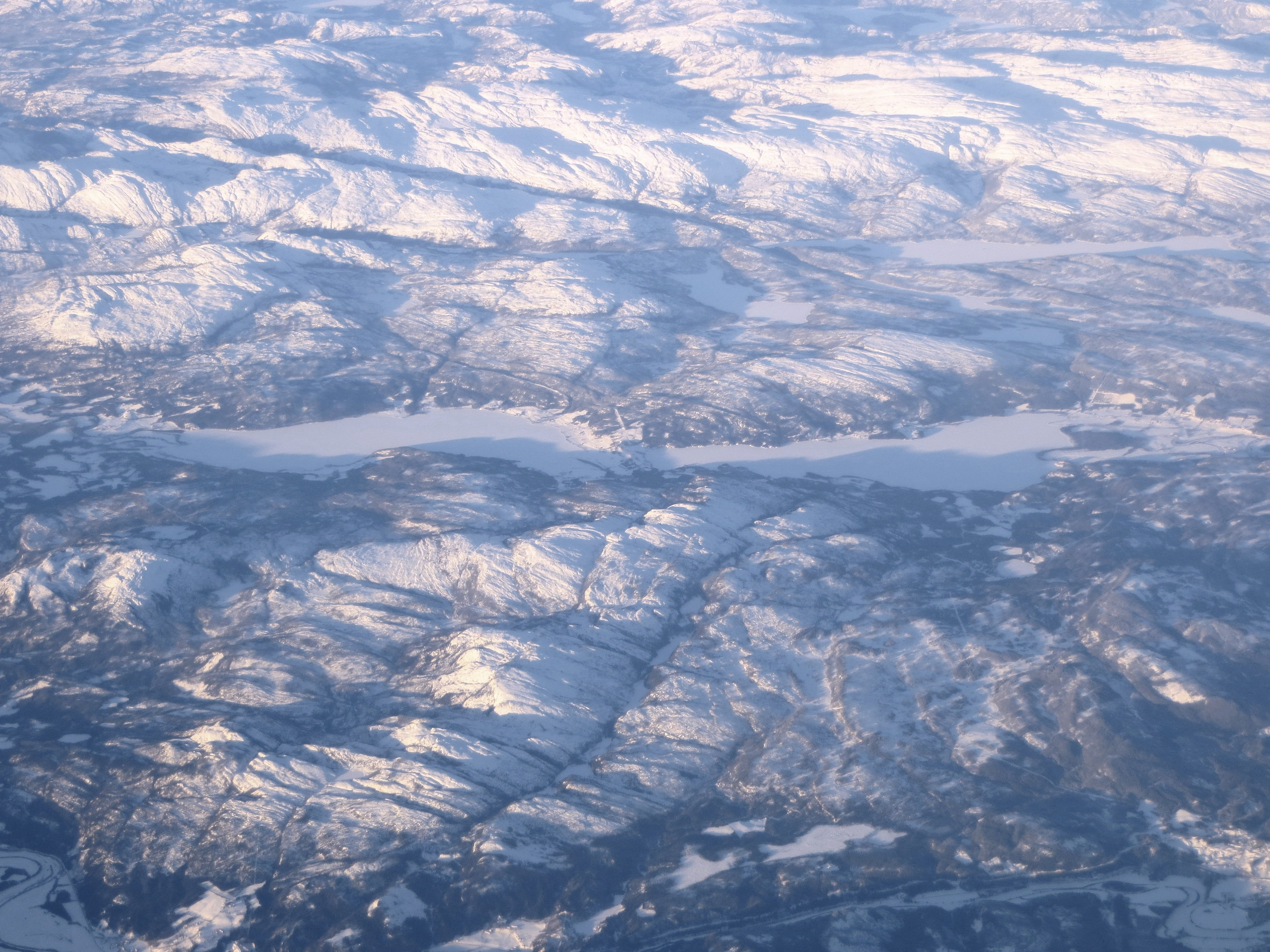
- Aerial view of the lake in winter
- Interactive map of the lake
- Location: Overhalla Municipality and Høylandet Municipality, Trøndelag
- Coordinates: 64.5348°N 12.1143°E
- Basin countries: Norway
- Max. length: 5 kilometres (3.1 mi)
- Max. width: 1.5 kilometres (0.93 mi)
- Surface area: 15.87 km^{2} (6.13 sq mi)
- Shore length^{1}: 6.27 kilometres (3.90 mi)
- Surface elevation: 6 metres (20 ft)
- References: NVE
- ^{1} Shore length is not a well-defined measure.

Eidsvatnet is a lake on the border of Høylandet Municipality and Overhalla Municipality in Trøndelag county, Norway. The 15.87-square-kilometre (6.13 sq mi) lake lies about 5 kilometres (3.1 mi) northeast of the village of Skogmo. The lake empties into the river Bjøra which flows a short distance into the large river Namsen.

== See also ==
- List of lakes in Norway
