= Ranem Church =

Church in Trøndelag, Norway

- Ranem kirke
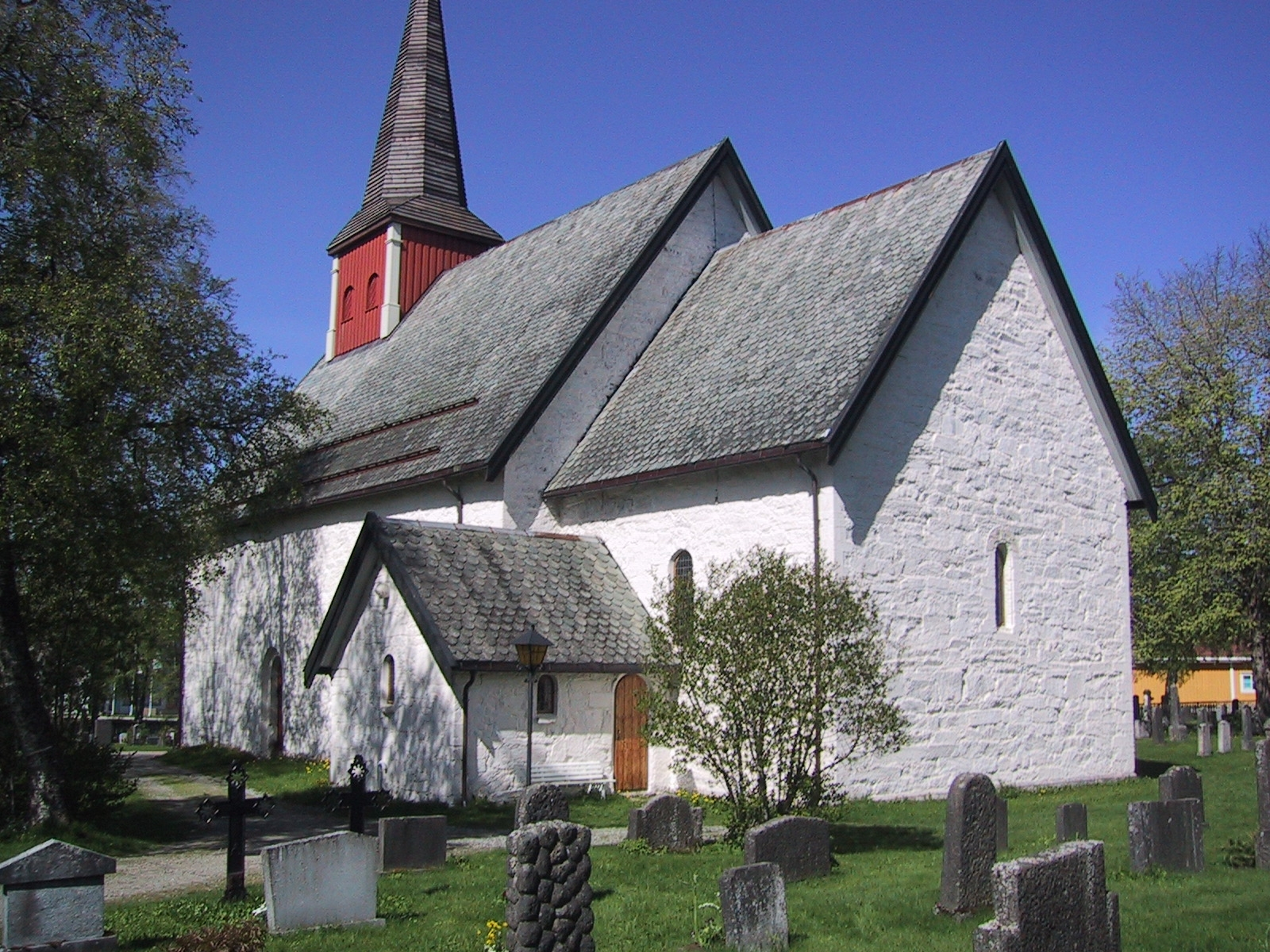
- View of the church
- Ranem Church
- 64.49347723°N 11.95151835°E
- Location: Overhalla Municipality, Trøndelag
- Country: Norway
- Denomination: Church of Norway
- Previous denomination: Catholic Church
- Churchmanship: Evangelical Lutheran

History
- Status: Parish church
- Founded: c. 1187
- Consecrated: c. 1187

Architecture
- Functional status: Active
- Architectural type: Long church
- Style: Romanesque
- Completed: c. 1187 (839 years ago)

Specifications
- Capacity: 200
- Materials: Stone

Administration
- Diocese: Nidaros bispedømme
- Deanery: Namdal prosti
- Parish: Ranem
- Norwegian Cultural Heritage Site
- Type: Church
- Status: Automatically protected
- ID: 85272

Ranem Church (Norwegian: Ranem kirke) is a parish church of the Church of Norway in Overhalla Municipality in Trøndelag county, Norway. It is located in the village of Ranemsletta. It is the church for the Ranem parish which is part of the Namdal prosti (deanery) in the Diocese of Nidaros. The medieval era, marble and stone church was built in a long church design in the mid-12th century using plans drawn up by an unknown architect. The church seats about 200 people.

== History ==
The earliest existing historical records of the church date back to the year 1326, but the church was likely built during the mid-12th century, likely around the year 1187. The Romanesque style church was built of stone from local quarries. It has a rectangular, 18.25-by-12-metre (59.9 ft × 39.4 ft) nave and a narrower, square 9.2-by-9.2-metre (30 ft × 30 ft) chancel. Originally, this was the only church to serve all of inner Namdal. Over the centuries, many chapels were built in the surrounding areas that were eventually split off as separate parishes.

In 1814, this church served as an election church (Norwegian: valgkirke). Together with more than 300 other parish churches across Norway, it was a polling station for elections to the 1814 Norwegian Constituent Assembly which wrote the Constitution of Norway. This was Norway's first national elections. Each church parish was a constituency that elected people called "electors" who later met together in each county to elect the representatives for the assembly that was to meet at Eidsvoll Manor later that year.

In 1878, Christian Christie led a renovation and restoration of the nearly 700-year old building. On 20 March 1899, the church suffered fire damage with all the interior wooden structures destroyed, but the stone walls remained. Fortunately, the historic altarpiece from 1678 was saved. The church was rebuilt the following year using the plans of Christian Christie's renovations in 1878. The interior and exterior walls were plastered at this time too. The church was reopened on Christmas Day 1900. A complete restoration of the church was begun in the late 1950s that was not completed until 1987 for the church's 800th anniversary.

== Media gallery ==
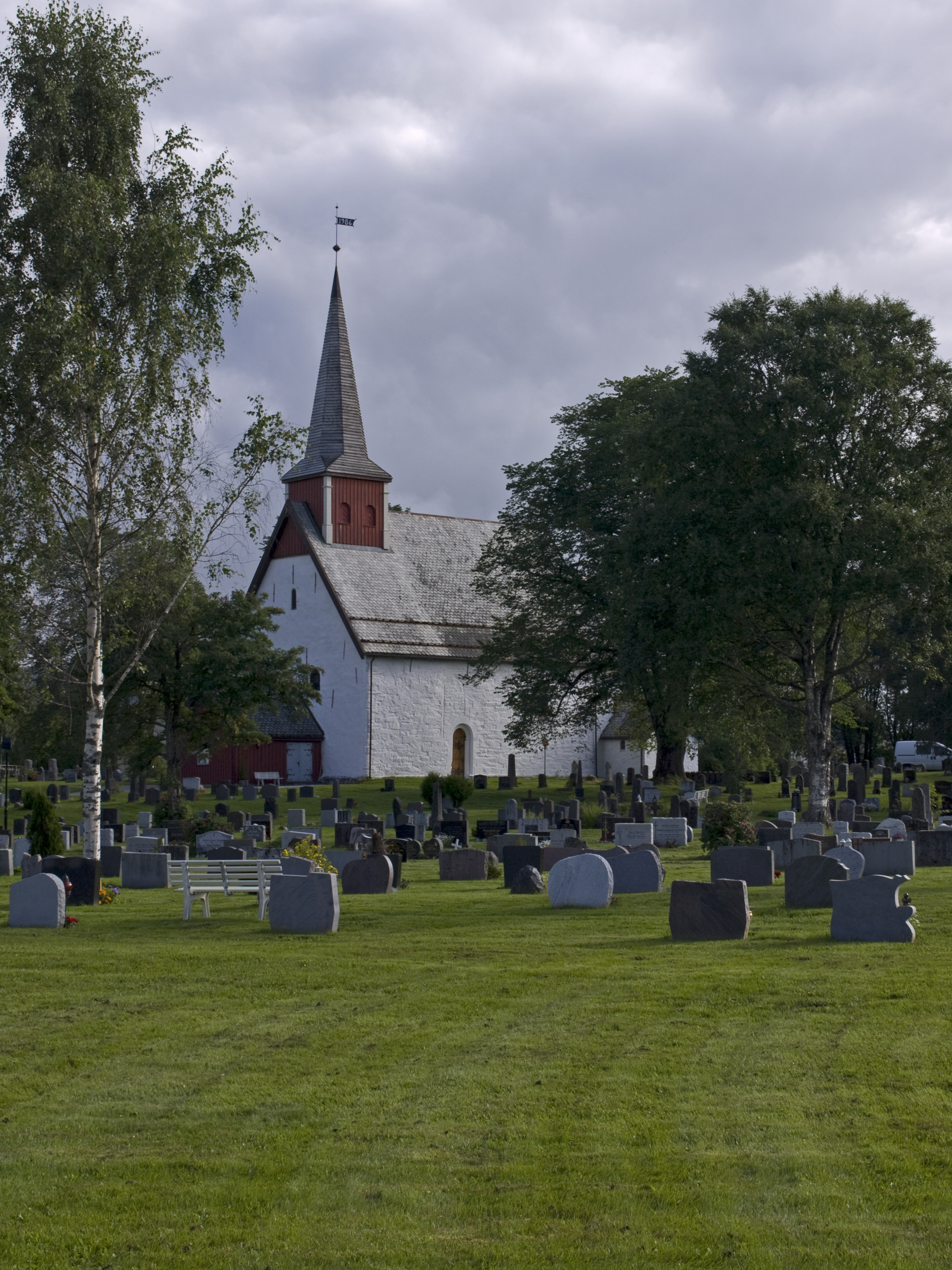

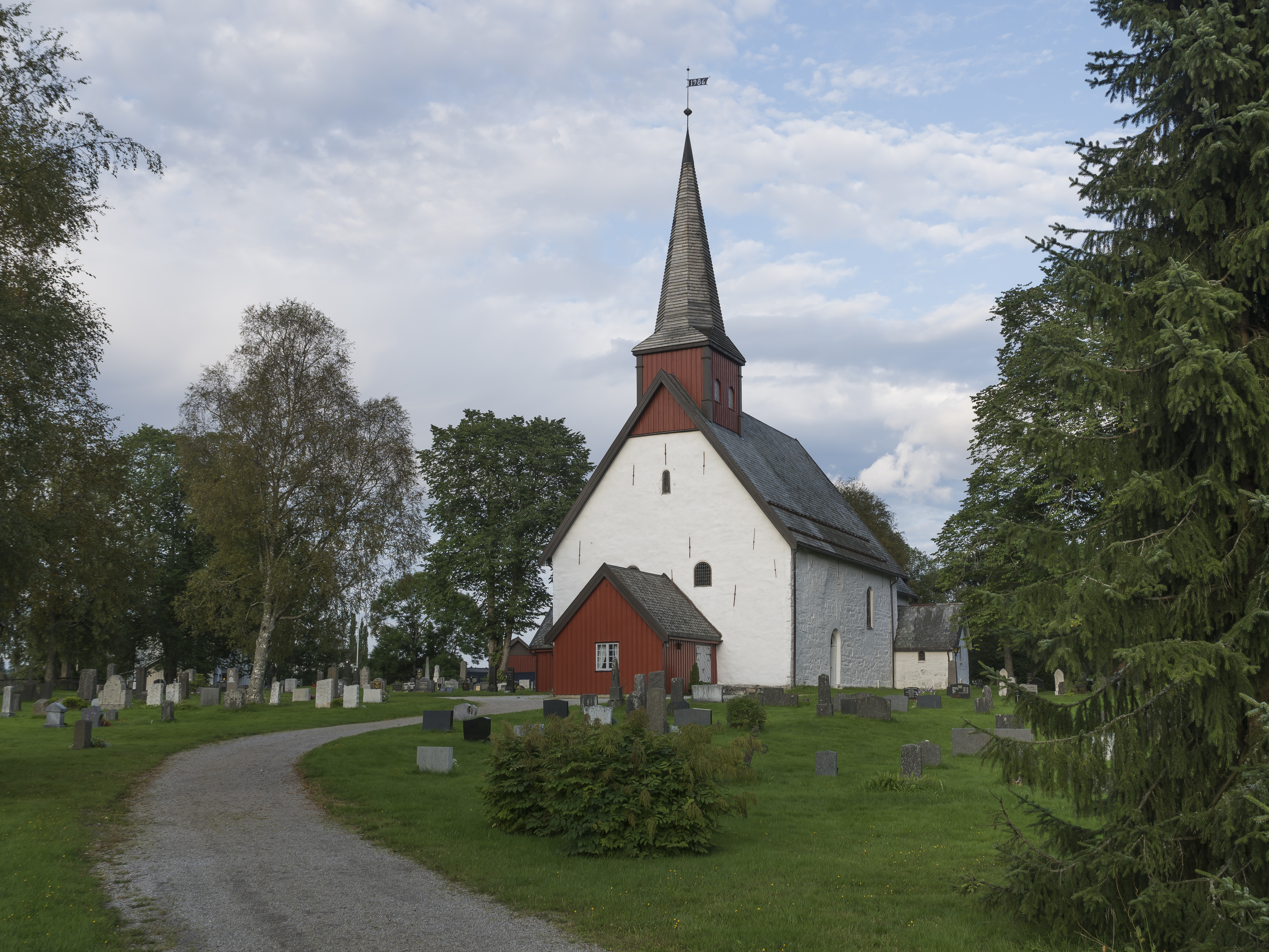

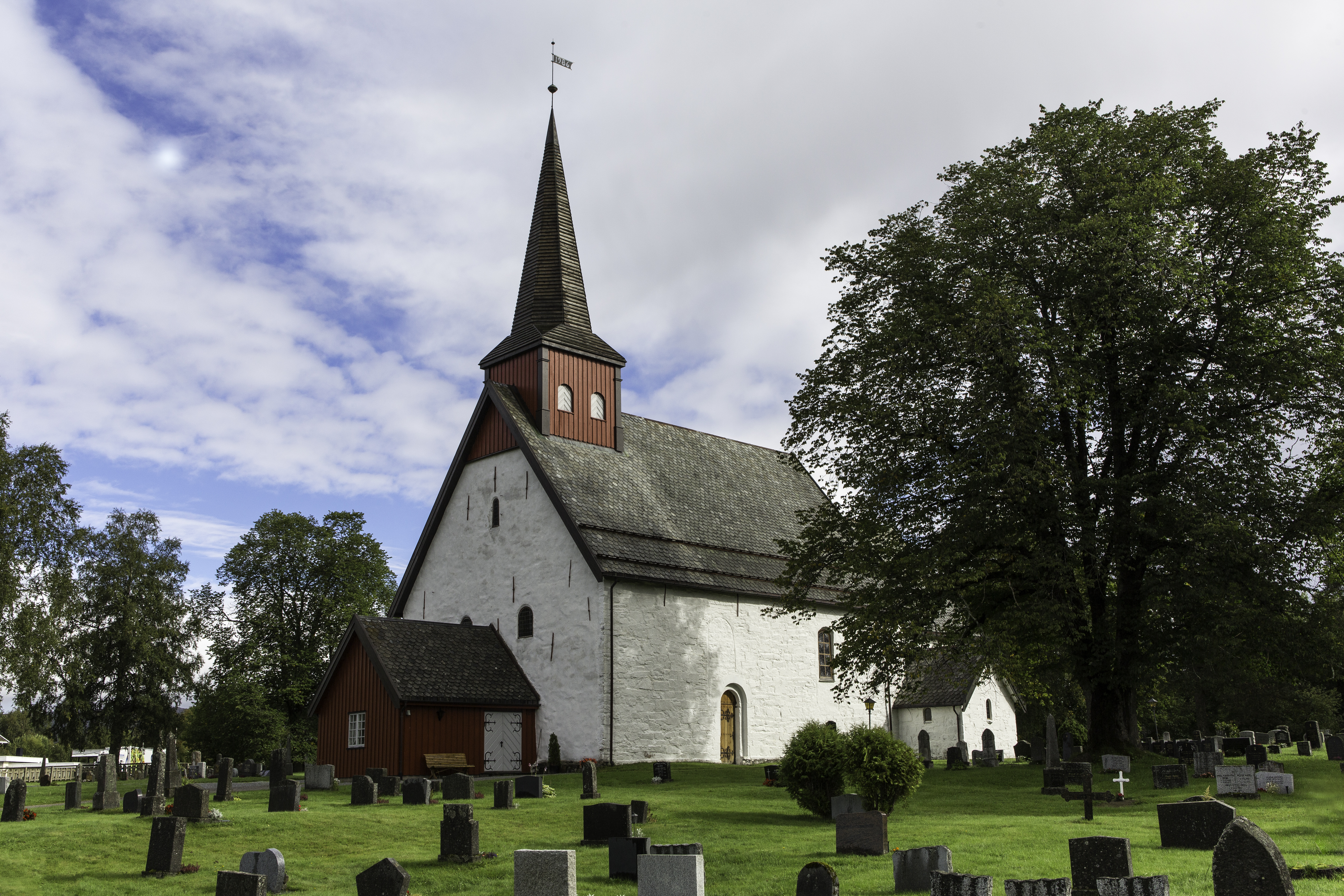

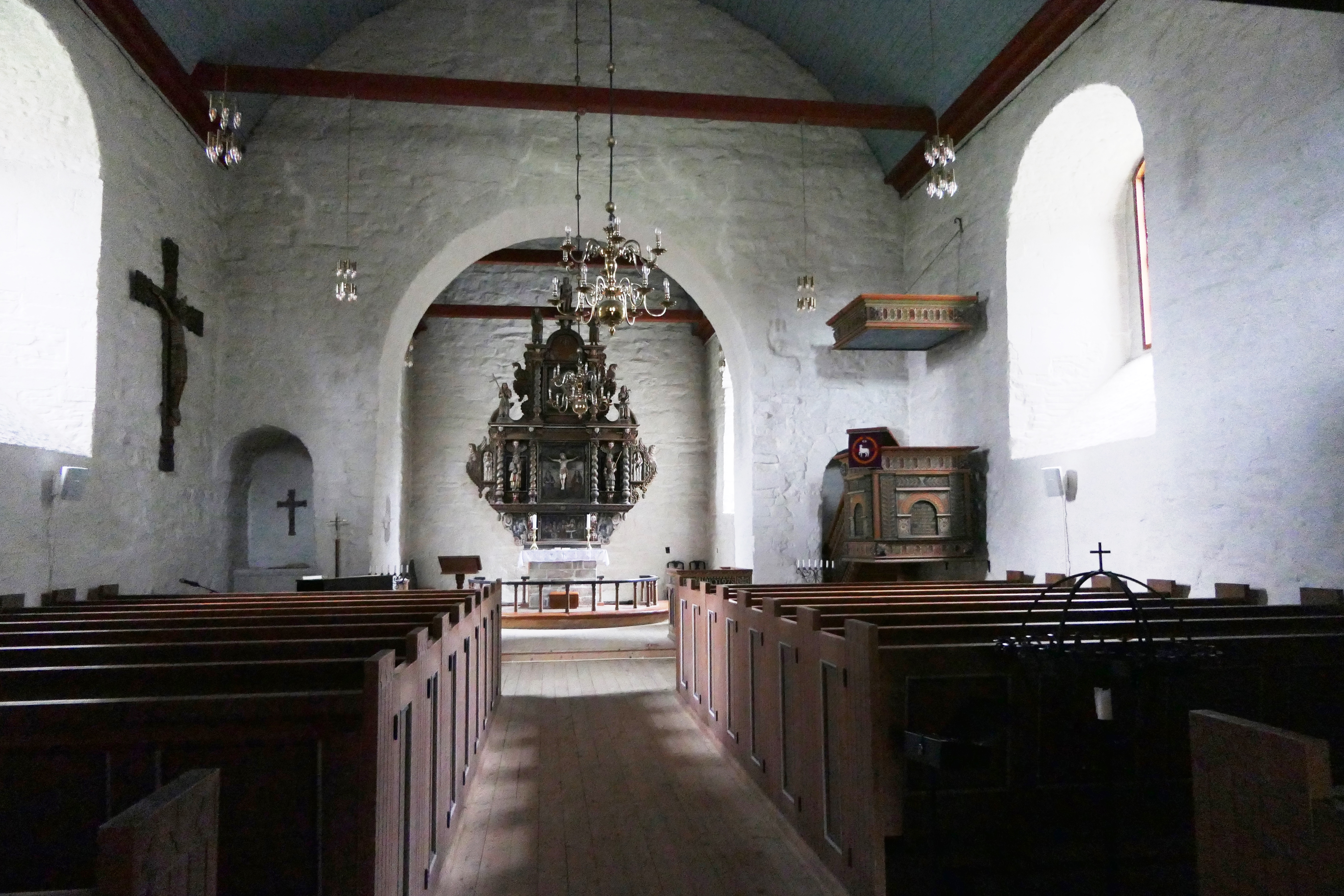

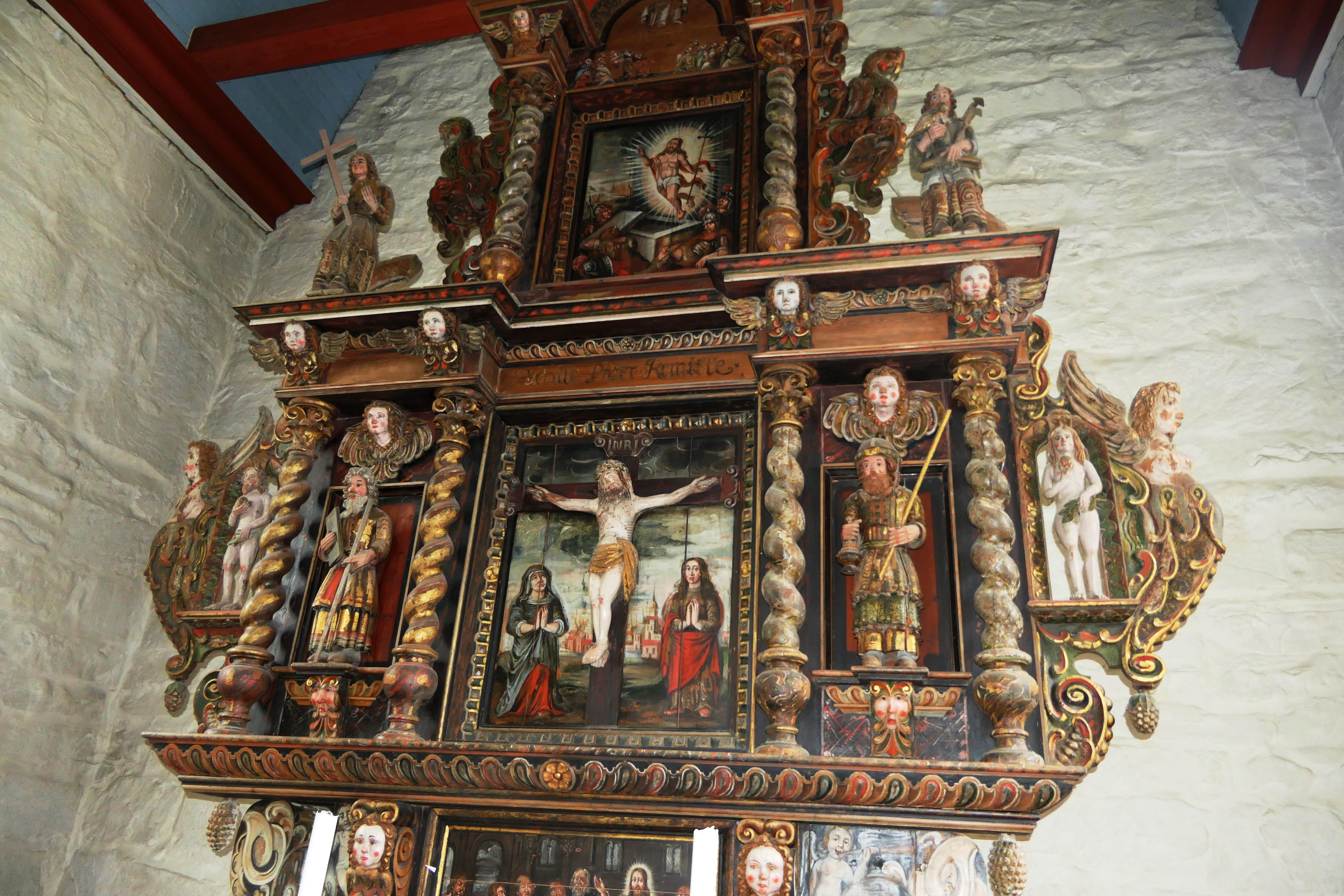

== See also ==
- List of churches in Nidaros
