= Svalia, Norway =

Village in Overhalla Municipality, Norway

Svalia
- Village
- Interactive map of Svalia
- Location within Trøndelag Location within Norway
- Coordinates: 64.5041°N 11.9459°E
- Country: Norway
- Region: Central Norway
- County: Trøndelag
- District: Namdalen
- Municipality: Overhalla Municipality

Area
  - Total: 0.25 km^{2} (0.097 sq mi)
- Elevation: 38 m (125 ft)

Population (2024)
  - Total: 279
  - Density: 1,116/km^{2} (2,890/sq mi)
- Time zone: UTC+01:00 (CET)
  - Summer (DST): UTC+02:00 (CEST)
- Post Code: 7863 Overhalla

Svalia is a village in Overhalla Municipality in Trøndelag county, Norway. The residential community is located about 1.5 kilometres (0.93 mi) north of the municipal centre, Ranemsletta. The 0.25-square-kilometre (62-acre) village has a population (2024) of 279 and a population density of 1,116 inhabitants per square kilometre (2,890/sq mi).
