= Overhalla Municipality =

Municipality in Trøndelag, Norway

Overhalla Municipality Overhalla kommune Ååverhaellie
- Municipality
- Overhallen herred (historic name)
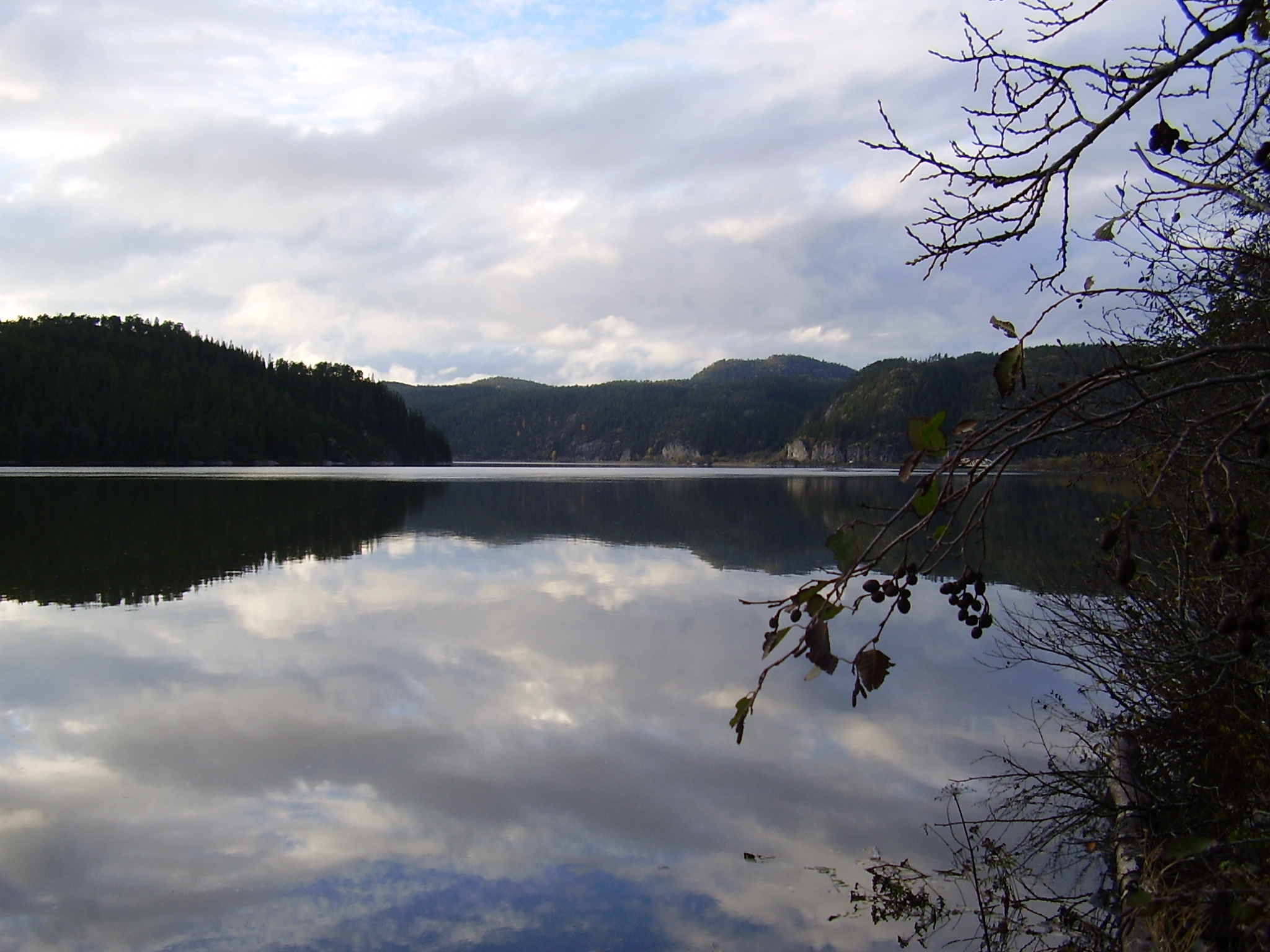

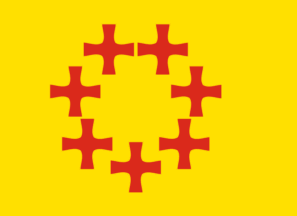
- Flag Coat of arms

- Trøndelag within Norway

- Overhalla within Trøndelag
- Coordinates: 64°30′28″N 11°53′38″E
- Country: Norway
- County: Trøndelag
- District: Namdalen
- Established: 1 Jan 1838
  - Created as: Formannskapsdistrikt
- Administrative centre: Ranemsletta

Government
  - Mayor (2021): Hege Kristin Kværnø Saugen (Sp)

Area
  - Total: 730.05 km^{2} (281.87 sq mi)
  - Land: 689.34 km^{2} (266.16 sq mi)
  - Water: 40.71 km^{2} (15.72 sq mi) 5.6%
  - Rank: #155 in Norway
- Highest elevation: 726.51 m (2,383.6 ft)

Population (2024)
  - Total: 3,924
  - Rank: #205 in Norway
  - Density: 5.4/km^{2} (14/sq mi)
  - Change (10 years): ▲ +5.1%
- Demonym: Overhallning

Official language
  - Norwegian form: Neutral
- Time zone: UTC+01:00 (CET)
  - Summer (DST): UTC+02:00 (CEST)
- ISO 3166 code: NO-5047
- Website: Official website

Overhalla is a municipality in Trøndelag county, Norway. It is part of the Namdalen region. The administrative centre of the municipality is the village of Ranemsletta (also called Overhalla). Other villages include Melen, Hunn, Skogmo, Svalia, and Øysletta.

The population is concentrated in the relatively broad Namsen river valley at the center. Public services, agriculture, and tourism are the main sources of income. Overhallahus (a house building company) and Pharmaq (a fish vaccine factory) are both located in the municipality.

The 730-square-kilometre (280 sq mi) municipality is the 155th largest by area out of the 357 municipalities in Norway. Overhalla Municipality is the 205th most populous municipality in Norway with a population of 3,924. The municipality's population density is 5.6 inhabitants per square kilometre (15/sq mi) and its population has increased by 5.1% over the previous 10-year period.

== General information ==
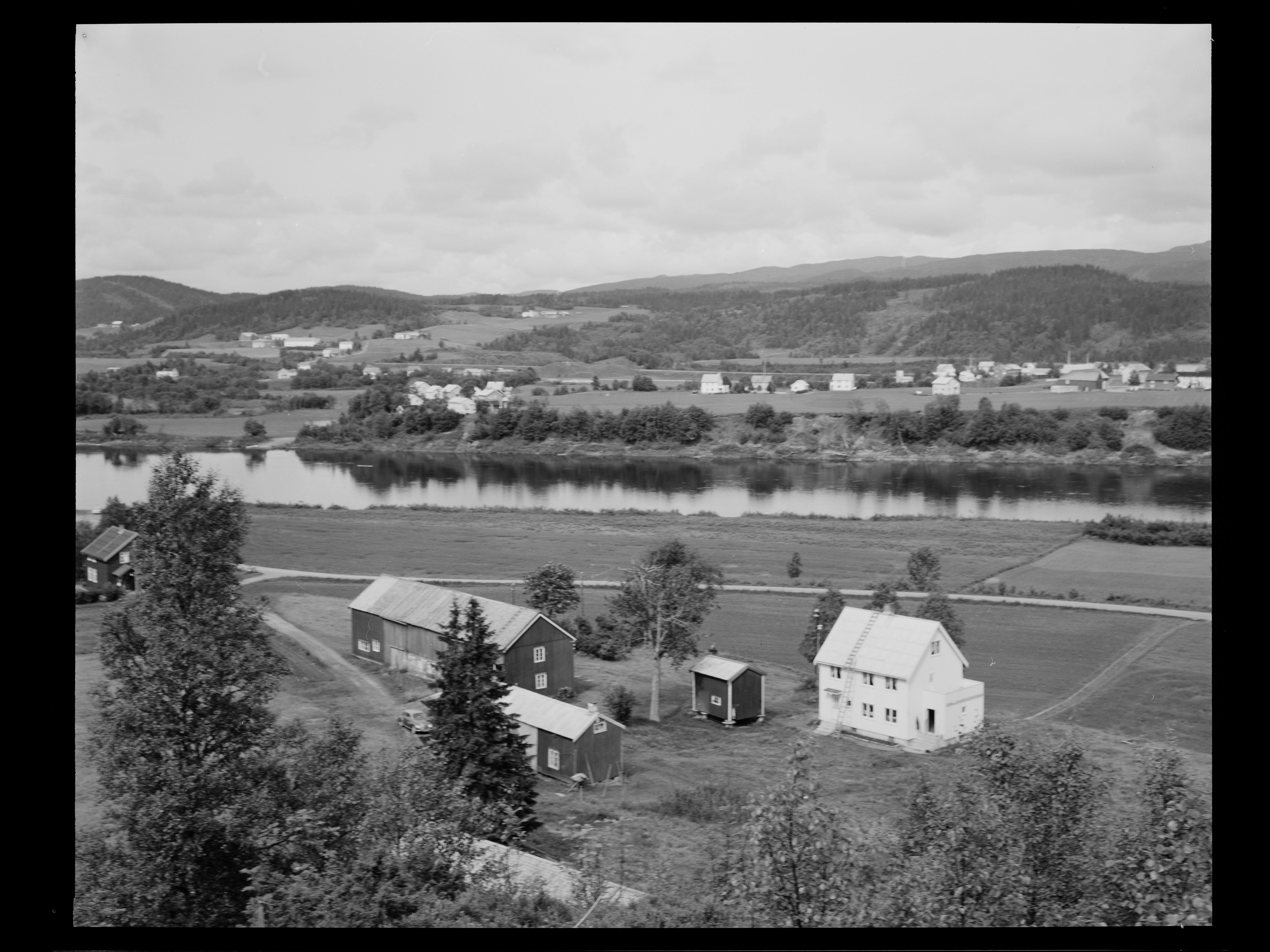
View of Overhalla in the mid-20th century

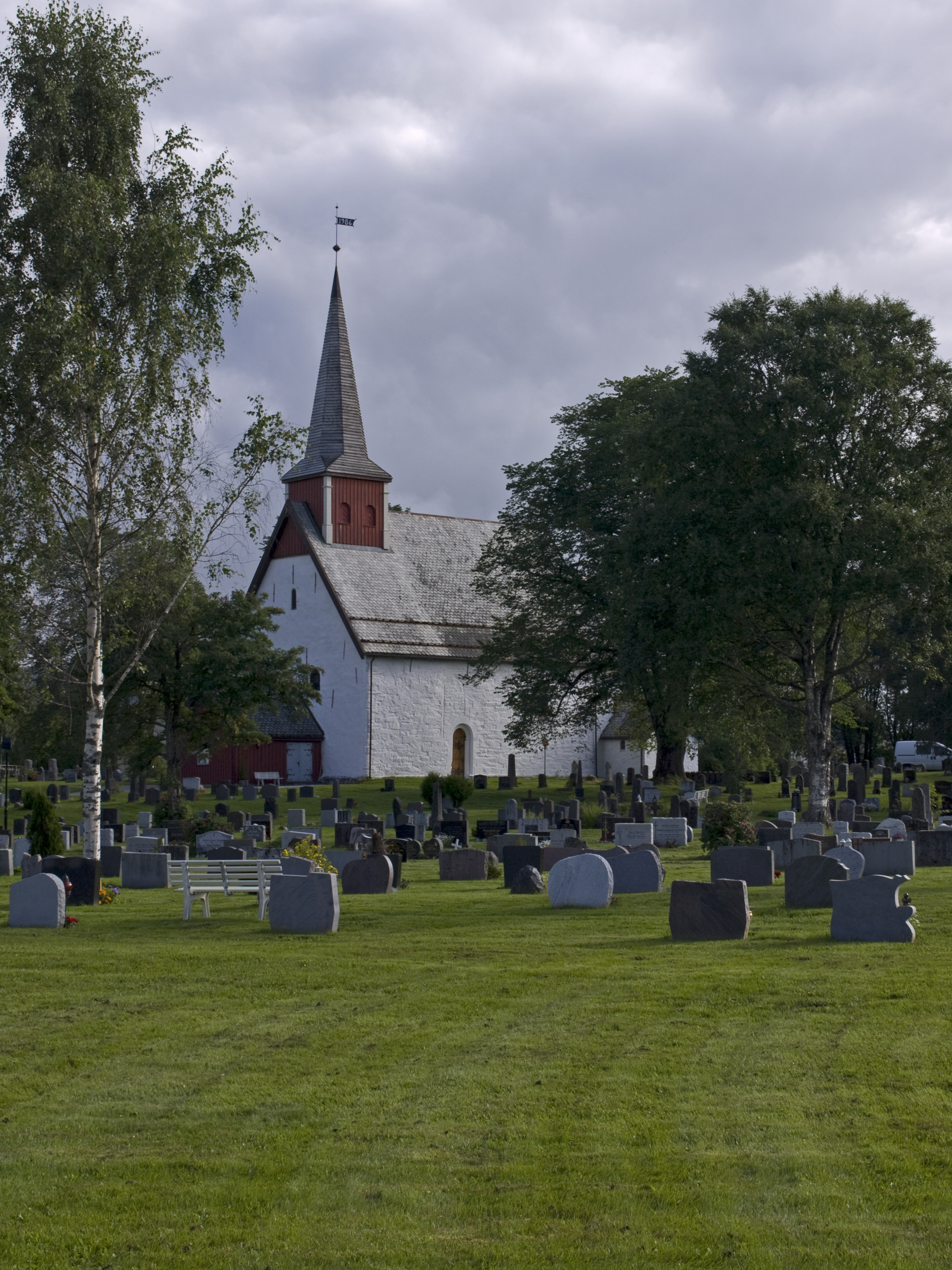
Ranem Church

The municipality of Overhalla was established on 1 January 1838 (see formannskapsdistrikt law). During the 1960s, there were many municipal mergers across Norway due to the work of the Schei Committee, although Overhalla's borders were only slightly modified. On 1 January 1964, the Galguften and Hauknes area (population: 15) of Høylandet Municipality (on the southern shore of the lake Eidsvatnet) was transferred to Overhalla Municipality.

On 1 January 2018, the municipality switched from the old Nord-Trøndelag county to the new Trøndelag county.

=== Name ===
The municipality (originally the parish) is named Overhalla (Old Norse: œfri hálfa), an old name for the area. Historically, the Namdalen district was divided in two parts: "the upper half" and "the lower half". The first element comes from the word efri which means "upper". The last element derives from the word halfr which means "half". Thus, the name means "the upper half (of Namdalen)". The municipality of Overhalla today is, however, just a fraction of the old part of what was historically considered œfri hálfa. Historically, the name of the municipality was spelled Overhallen. On 3 November 1917, a royal resolution changed the spelling of the name of the municipality to Overhalla.

=== Coat of arms ===
The coat of arms was granted on 2 June 1989. The official blazon is "Or, sevense crosses gules in annulo" (Norwegian: I gull sju røde kors som danner en sirkel). This means the arms have a field (background) has a tincture of Or which means it is commonly colored yellow, but if it is made out of metal, then gold is used. The charge is a circular arrangement of seven greek crosses. The design was inspired by a 1344 seal used by local peasants on a document regarding the coronation of King Håkon Magnusson. The seal depicts a building topped with a cross similar to those on the coat of arms and at the local Ranem Church. The arms were designed by Harald Ekseth. The municipal flag has the same design as the coat of arms.

== Geography ==
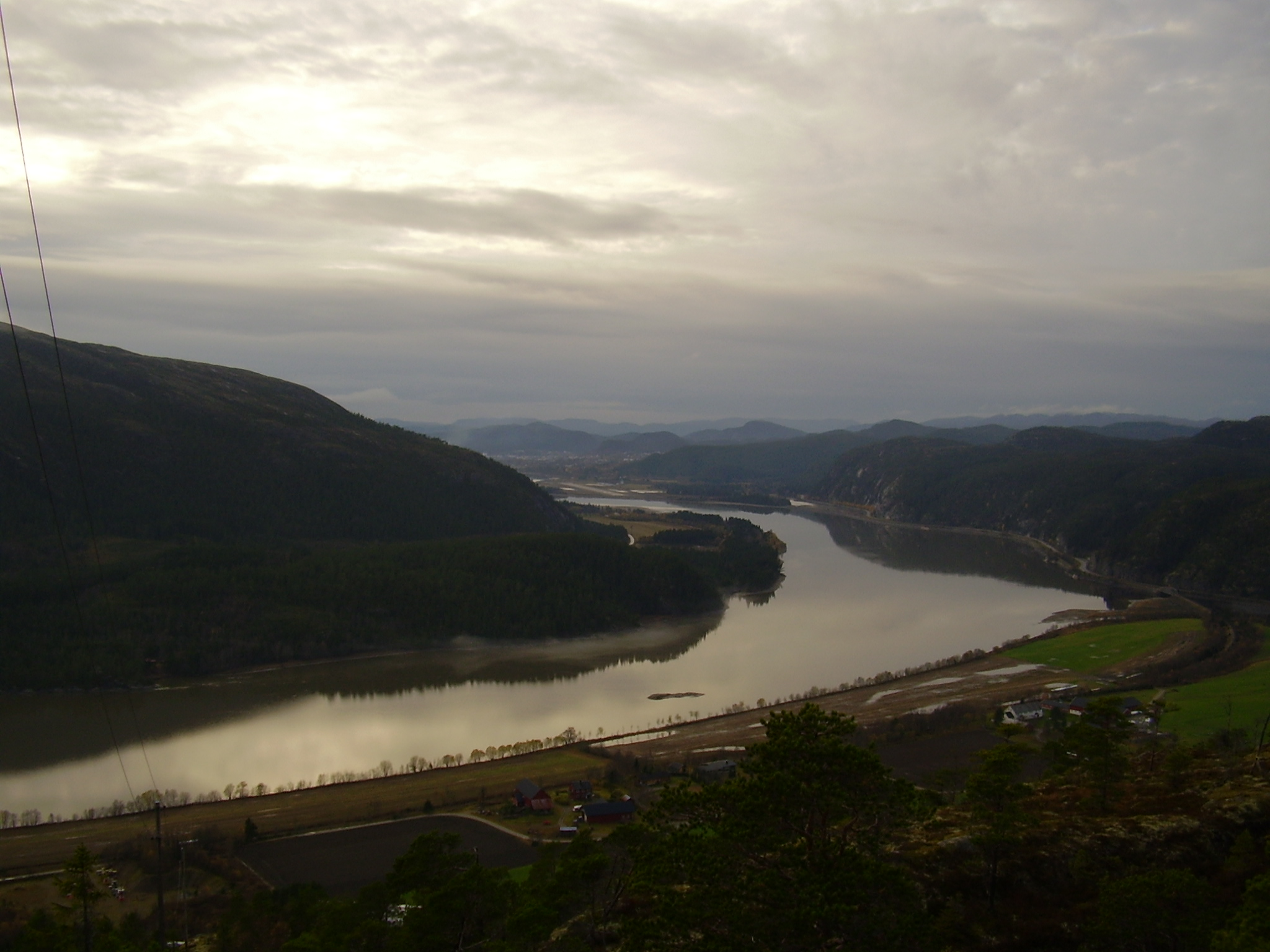
View of the river Namsen

The municipality includes part of the lake Eidsvatnet, from which the river Bjøra flows into the river Namsen, which runs from the east to the west. By the time it reaches the border with Namsos Municipality, the river Namsen is already brackish and influenced by the tides the ocean. The river Nordelva also empties into the estuary here. On the south side of the Namsen river, there is an area of mountains and mountain lakes. The highest point in the municipality is the 726.51-metre (2,383.6 ft) tall mountain Reinsjøfjellet. The Bangsjøene lakes form the border with Snåsa Municipality. The western approaches to Geitfjell lies in Overhalla Municipality, while the summit lies in Grong Municipality. The southern tip of the lake Storgrønningen lies in Overhalla Municipality, while the vast majority of the lake lies in Høylandet Municipality.

== Government ==
Overhalla Municipality is responsible for primary education (through 10th grade), outpatient health services, senior citizen services, welfare and other social services, zoning, economic development, and municipal roads and utilities. The municipality is governed by a municipal council of directly elected representatives. The mayor is indirectly elected by a vote of the municipal council. The municipality is under the jurisdiction of the Trøndelag District Court and the Frostating Court of Appeal.

Municipal waste management has since 1979 been handled by the inter-municipal Midtre Namdal Avfallsselskap, with ReTrans Midt handling waste collection since 2018. MNA is headquartered in Overhalla and has its main, regional recycling center situated at Stormyra at Sandmoen.

=== Municipal council ===
The municipal council (Kommunestyre) of Overhalla Municipality is made up of 21 representatives that are elected to four year terms. The tables below show the current and historical composition of the council by political party.

Overhalla kommunestyre 2023–2027
Party name (in Norwegian)	Number of representatives
Labour Party (Arbeiderpartiet)	5
Progress Party (Fremskrittspartiet)	3
Centre Party (Senterpartiet)	11
Socialist Left Party (Sosialistisk Venstreparti)	2
Total number of members:	21

Overhalla kommunestyre 2019–2023
Party name (in Norwegian)	Number of representatives
Labour Party (Arbeiderpartiet)	5
Progress Party (Fremskrittspartiet)	1
Conservative Party (Høyre)	1
Centre Party (Senterpartiet)	13
Socialist Left Party (Sosialistisk Venstreparti)	1
Total number of members:	21

Overhalla kommunestyre 2015–2019
Party name (in Norwegian)	Number of representatives
Labour Party (Arbeiderpartiet)	5
Progress Party (Fremskrittspartiet)	2
Conservative Party (Høyre)	1
Centre Party (Senterpartiet)	13
Total number of members:	21

Overhalla kommunestyre 2011–2015
Party name (in Norwegian)	Number of representatives
Labour Party (Arbeiderpartiet)	8
Progress Party (Fremskrittspartiet)	3
Conservative Party (Høyre)	1
Centre Party (Senterpartiet)	8
Socialist Left Party (Sosialistisk Venstreparti)	1
Total number of members:	21

Overhalla kommunestyre 2007–2011
Party name (in Norwegian)	Number of representatives
Labour Party (Arbeiderpartiet)	6
Progress Party (Fremskrittspartiet)	2
Conservative Party (Høyre)	1
Centre Party (Senterpartiet)	10
Socialist Left Party (Sosialistisk Venstreparti)	1
Liberal Party (Venstre)	1
Total number of members:	21

Overhalla kommunestyre 2003–2007
Party name (in Norwegian)	Number of representatives
Labour Party (Arbeiderpartiet)	7
Conservative Party (Høyre)	2
Centre Party (Senterpartiet)	8
Socialist Left Party (Sosialistisk Venstreparti)	2
Liberal Party (Venstre)	2
Total number of members:	21

Overhalla kommunestyre 1999–2003
Party name (in Norwegian)	Number of representatives
Labour Party (Arbeiderpartiet)	9
Centre Party (Senterpartiet)	7
Socialist Left Party (Sosialistisk Venstreparti)	2
Joint list of the Conservative Party (Høyre), Christian Democratic Party (Kristelig Folkeparti), and Liberal Party (Venstre)	3
Total number of members:	21

Overhalla kommunestyre 1995–1999
Party name (in Norwegian)	Number of representatives
Labour Party (Arbeiderpartiet)	6
Centre Party (Senterpartiet)	12
Socialist Left Party (Sosialistisk Venstreparti)	2
Liberal Party (Venstre)	1
Total number of members:	21

Overhalla kommunestyre 1991–1995
Party name (in Norwegian)	Number of representatives
Labour Party (Arbeiderpartiet)	5
Conservative Party (Høyre)	1
Centre Party (Senterpartiet)	11
Socialist Left Party (Sosialistisk Venstreparti)	3
Liberal Party (Venstre)	1
Total number of members:	21

Overhalla kommunestyre 1987–1991
Party name (in Norwegian)	Number of representatives
Labour Party (Arbeiderpartiet)	7
Conservative Party (Høyre)	1
Centre Party (Senterpartiet)	11
Socialist Left Party (Sosialistisk Venstreparti)	1
Liberal Party (Venstre)	1
Total number of members:	21

Overhalla kommunestyre 1983–1987
Party name (in Norwegian)	Number of representatives
Labour Party (Arbeiderpartiet)	7
Conservative Party (Høyre)	2
Centre Party (Senterpartiet)	7
Liberal Party (Venstre)	1
Total number of members:	17

Overhalla kommunestyre 1979–1983
Party name (in Norwegian)	Number of representatives
Labour Party (Arbeiderpartiet)	7
Conservative Party (Høyre)	2
Centre Party (Senterpartiet)	7
Liberal Party (Venstre)	1
Total number of members:	17

Overhalla kommunestyre 1975–1979
Party name (in Norwegian)	Number of representatives
Labour Party (Arbeiderpartiet)	6
Centre Party (Senterpartiet)	7
Liberal Party (Venstre)	3
Joint list of the Conservative Party (Høyre), Christian Democratic Party (Kristelig Folkeparti), and New People's Party (Nye Folkepartiet)	1
Total number of members:	17

Overhalla kommunestyre 1971–1975
Party name (in Norwegian)	Number of representatives
Labour Party (Arbeiderpartiet)	7
Centre Party (Senterpartiet)	7
Liberal Party (Venstre)	3
Total number of members:	17

Overhalla kommunestyre 1967–1971
Party name (in Norwegian)	Number of representatives
Labour Party (Arbeiderpartiet)	5
Conservative Party (Høyre)	1
Centre Party (Senterpartiet)	8
Socialist People's Party (Sosialistisk Folkeparti)	1
Liberal Party (Venstre)	2
Total number of members:	17

Overhalla kommunestyre 1963–1967
Party name (in Norwegian)	Number of representatives
Labour Party (Arbeiderpartiet)	7
Conservative Party (Høyre)	1
Centre Party (Senterpartiet)	7
Liberal Party (Venstre)	2
Total number of members:	17

Overhalla herredsstyre 1959–1963
Party name (in Norwegian)	Number of representatives
Labour Party (Arbeiderpartiet)	7
Centre Party (Senterpartiet)	8
Liberal Party (Venstre)	2
Total number of members:	17

Overhalla herredsstyre 1955–1959
Party name (in Norwegian)	Number of representatives
Labour Party (Arbeiderpartiet)	7
Farmers' Party (Bondepartiet)	8
Liberal Party (Venstre)	2
Total number of members:	17

Overhalla herredsstyre 1951–1955
Party name (in Norwegian)	Number of representatives
Labour Party (Arbeiderpartiet)	6
Farmers' Party (Bondepartiet)	7
Liberal Party (Venstre)	3
Total number of members:	16

Overhalla herredsstyre 1947–1951
Party name (in Norwegian)	Number of representatives
Labour Party (Arbeiderpartiet)	6
Farmers' Party (Bondepartiet)	7
Liberal Party (Venstre)	3
Total number of members:	16

Overhalla herredsstyre 1945–1947
Party name (in Norwegian)	Number of representatives
Labour Party (Arbeiderpartiet)	6
Farmers' Party (Bondepartiet)	6
Liberal Party (Venstre)	2
Local List(s) (Lokale lister)	2
Total number of members:	16

Overhalla herredsstyre 1937–1941*
Party name (in Norwegian)	Number of representatives
Labour Party (Arbeiderpartiet)	4
Farmers' Party (Bondepartiet)	8
Liberal Party (Venstre)	3
Local List(s) (Lokale lister)	1
Total number of members:	16
Note: Due to the German occupation of Norway during World War II, no elections were held for new municipal councils until after the war ended in 1945.

=== Mayors ===
The mayor (Norwegian: ordfører) of Overhalla Municipality is the political leader of the municipality and the chairperson of the municipal council. Here is a list of people who have held this position:

- 1838–1841: Hans Tetlie
- 1842–1843: Andreas Samuelsen Vibstad
- 1844–1845: Halle E. Gansmo
- 1846–1849: Mathias A. Sellæg
- 1850–1851: Ove Christian Roll
- 1851–1853: Mathias A. Sellæg
- 1854–1855: Johan A. Sellæg
- 1856–1859: J.G. Steen
- 1860–1861: Halle E. Tetlie
- 1862–1869: Andreas Erlandsen
- 1870–1871: Johannes F. Barlien
- 1872–1877: Peter N. Solum
- 1878–1887: Svein G. Tetlie (V)
- 1888–1889: Ole M. Weglo (V)
- 1889–1891: Vilhelm Andreas Wexelsen (V)
- 1892–1910: Ole M. Weglo (V)
- 1911–1919: Peter S. Raabakken (V)
- 1920–1922: Esten Saugen (Bp)
- 1923–1928: Lorents Nagelhus (Bp)
- 1929–1931: Esten Saugen (Bp)
- 1932–1934: Lorents Nagelhus (Bp)
- 1935–1940: Olav Flotten (Bp)
- 1941–1942: Magnus Øyesvold (NS)
- 1942–1945: Aage Hagerup (NS)
- 1945–1945: Olav Flotten (Bp)
- 1946–1951: Agnar Grande (Bp)
- 1952–1955: Inge Himo (Bp)
- 1956–1960: Agnar Grande (Bp)
- 1960–1961: Inge Himo (Sp)
- 1962–1963: Sigmund Flasnes (Sp)
- 1964–1970: Kristian Hildrum (Sp)
- 1970–1975: Jostein O. Mørkved (V)
- 1976–1979: Sigmund Flasnes (Sp)
- 1980–1981: Jørund Øvereng (Sp)
- 1982–1999: Jørgen Tømmerås (Sp)
- 1999–2003: Frank Jensen (Ap)
- 2003–2003: Susanne Bratli (Ap)
- 2003–2011: Jostein Hildrum (Sp)
- 2011–2021: Per Olav Tyldum (Sp)
- 2021–present: Hege Kristin Kværnø Saugen (Sp)

== Transportation ==
The historic Namsos Line railway traversed the municipality on its way from Grong to Namsos, but the line was closed to passenger traffic in 1978. Freight traffic on the line was discontinued in 2002. The Norwegian County Road 17 also crosses the municipality.

== Culture ==
There are 38 grave mounds in the Hunn area. The Olamo-haugen is the largest of those. The other ones have been dated to years 600 to 800 Common Era, just before the Viking Age. During the construction of a school in Hunn, the Olamo-haugen mound was uncovered and studied. About 300 square metres (3,200 sq ft) or about one-third of the mound was excavated by the time the dig was concluded (in 2022).

=== Churches ===
The Church of Norway has two parishes (sokn) within Overhalla Municipality. It is part of the Namdal prosti (deanery) in the Diocese of Nidaros.

Churches in Overhalla Municipality
Parish (sokn)	Church name	Location of the church	Year built
Ranem	Ranem Church	Ranemsletta	1187
Skage	Skage Church	Skage	1903

== Notable people ==
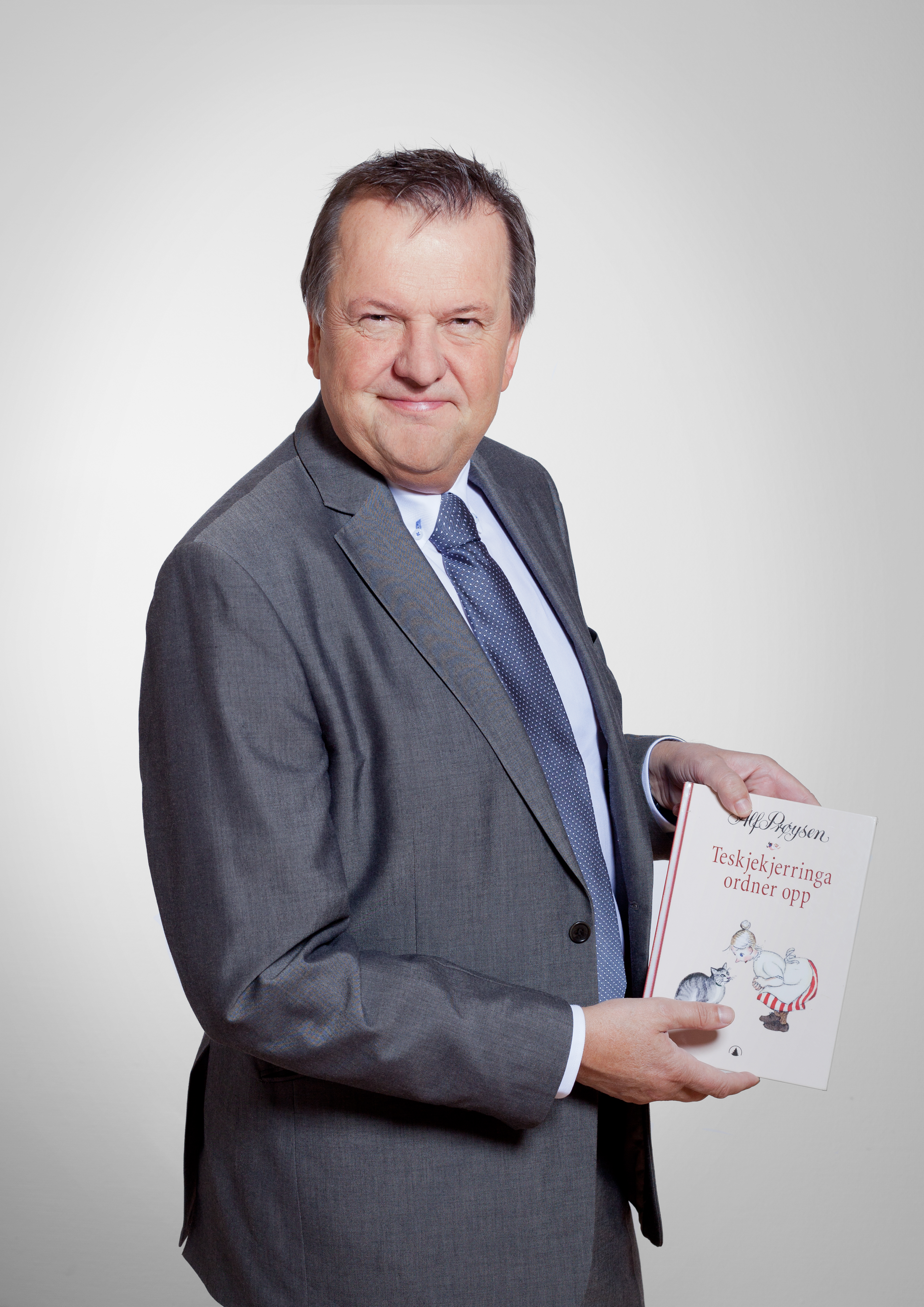
Inge Ryan, 2013

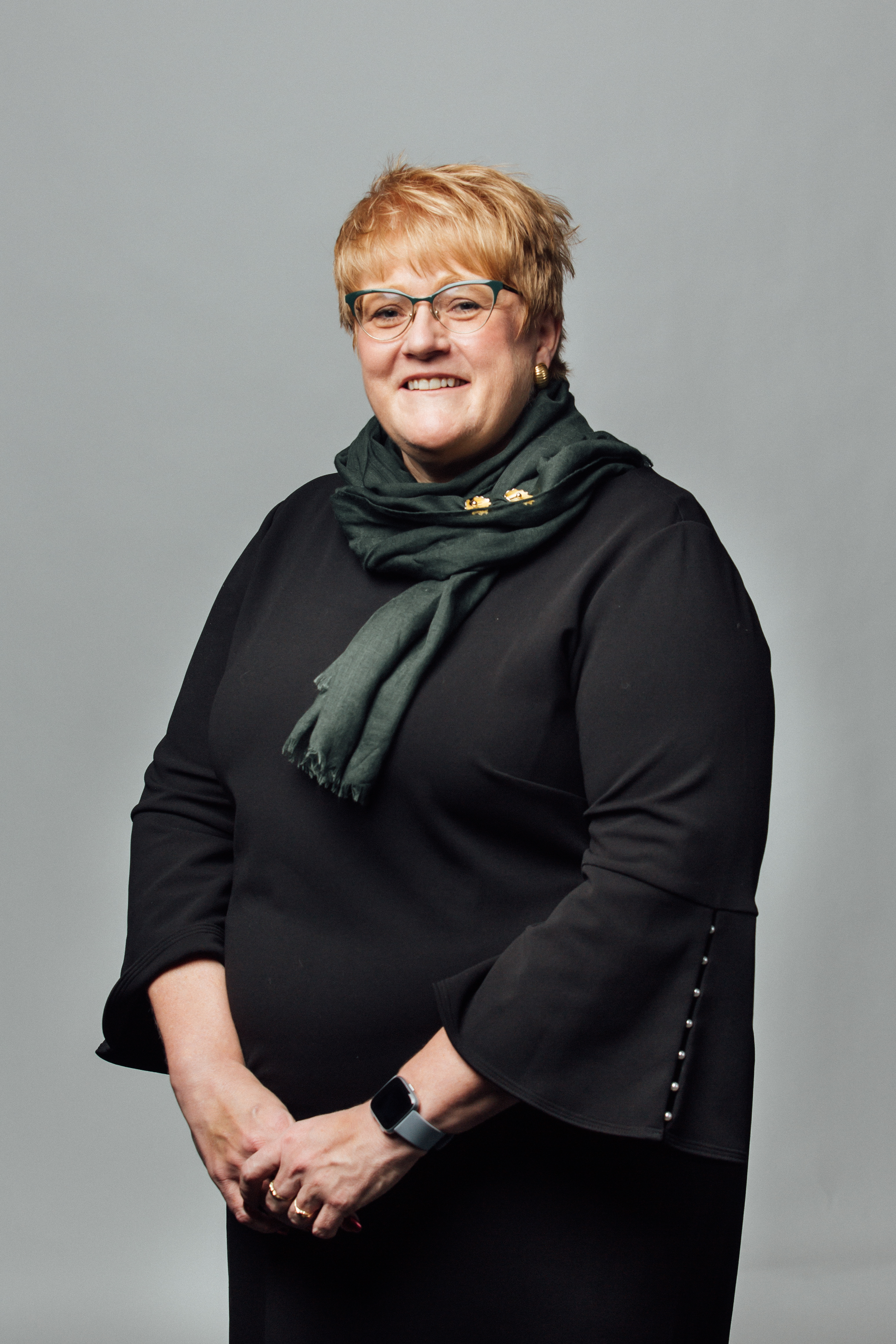
Trine Skei Grande, 2019

=== Public service ===
- Jacob Hersleb Darre (1757 in Overhalla – 1841), a vicar and representative at the Norwegian Constitutional Assembly
- Hans Barlien (1772 in Overhalla – 1842), a farmer and politician who established the Norwegian-American immigrant settlement in Sugar Creek, Iowa
- Christian Møinichen Havig (1825 in Overhalla – 1912), a bailiff and politician
- Kristen Gran Gleditsch (1867 in Overhalla – 1946), a Norwegian military officer and topographer
- Alf Hildrum (born 1948 in Overhalla), a media executive and politician
- Inge Ryan (born 1956 in Overhalla), a Norwegian politician who was Mayor of Namsskogan Municipality from 1991–1995 and County Governor of Nord-Trøndelag from 2009-2017
- Susanne Bratli (born 1966 in Overhalla), a Norwegian politician and Mayor of Overhalla in 2003
- Trine Skei Grande (born 1969 in Overhalla), a politician and former leader of the Liberal Party of Norway

=== Arts ===
- Kristian Elster (1841 in Overhalla – 1881), a novelist, journalist, literary critic, theatre critic, and forester
- Per Kvist (1890 in Overhalla – 1947), a revue writer, entertainer, and stage & film actor
- Johannes Rian (1891 in Overhalla – 1981), a painter
- Bjarne Brøndbo (born 1964) and Eskil Brøndbo (born 1970), two rock musicians from Namsos

=== Sport ===
- Gunhild Følstad (born 1981 in Overhalla), an international women's footballer
