= Namsos Line =

Former railway in Trøndelag, Norway

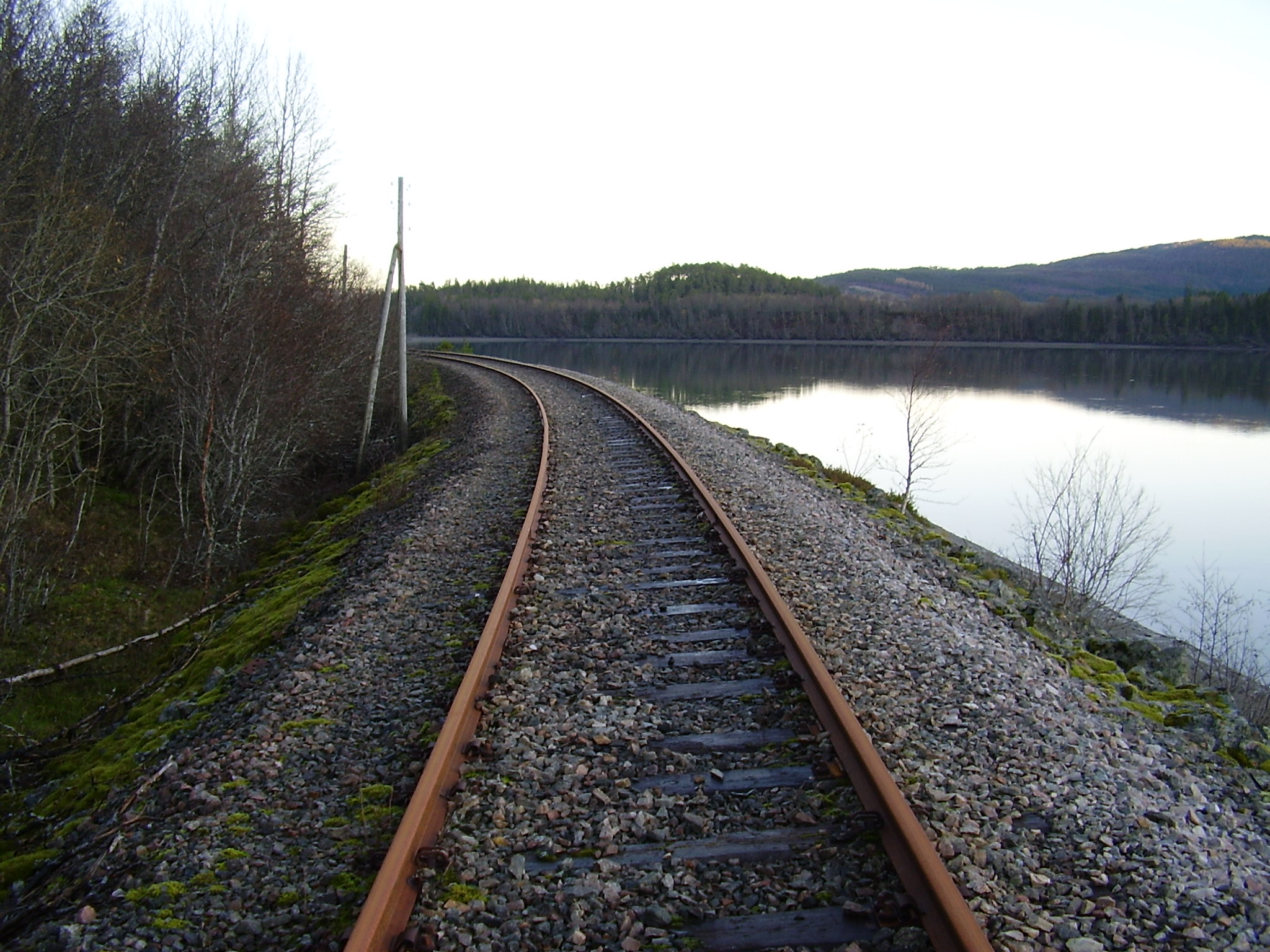
- The line running along Namsen

Overview
- Native name: Namsoslinjen
- Status: Closed
- Owner: Norwegian National Rail Administration
- Termini: Grong Station; Namsos Station

Service
- Type: Railway
- Operator: CargoNet

History
- Opened: 1 November 1933
- Closed: 2002

Technical
- Line length: 50.60 km (31.44 mi)
- Number of tracks: Single
- Character: Freight
- Track gauge: 1,435 mm (4 ft 8 1/2 in)
- Electrification: No
- Operating speed: 55 km/h (34 mph)
- Highest elevation: 50.9 m (167 ft) AMSL

The Namsos Line (Norwegian: Namsosbanen) is a 51-kilometer-long (32 mi) railway line between the village of Medjå and the town of Namsos in Trøndelag county, Norway. The line branches off from the Nordland Line at Grong Station and runs through Grong Municipality, Overhalla Municipality, and Namsos Municipality. The line largely follows the river Namsen (and it crosses the river twice). The section from Grong to Skogmo is maintained, although not used for ordinary traffic. The section from Skogmo to Namsos is closed, but the infrastructure remains.

Planning of the line started in the 1870s and it was originally thought as part of the Nordland Line. This resulted in a debate of whether the Nordland Line should run from Steinkjer via Beitstad and Namsos to Grong (the Beitstad Line) or via Snåsa to Grong, with a branch to Namsos. The latter was selected as it gave the shortest route for the Nordland Line, but gave a longer distance southwards from Namsos and went through a less densely populated area. The line was passed by Parliament in 1913, although construction did not start until 1921. In 1927, construction was halted, but resumed the following year, although the line was built with substandard permanent way. In November 1933 traffic started, and Namsos became the northernmost port in Norway with railway connection to southern Norway, until 1940 when the Nordland Line reached Mosjøen. Passenger traffic was terminated in 1977, and the line has been closed for ordinary traffic since 2002.

== Route ==
The Namsos Line branches from the Nordland Line at Grong and runs 50.60 kilometers (31.44 mi) to Namsos. Prior to 1981, the line had a different terminus in Namsos and was 51.61 kilometers (32.07 mi) long. The curve radius is 250 meters (820 ft) and the maximum gradient is 1.25 percent. The line has five tunnels, with a combined length of 338 meters (1,109 ft). The line is standard gauge, non-electrified, lacks centralized traffic control, automatic train control, and train radio. The railway line is owned and maintained by the Norwegian National Rail Administration. The section from Grong to Skogmo, Overhalla, remains open and maintained, but is not used for ordinary traffic. The section from Skogmo to Namsos remains, but is not maintained.

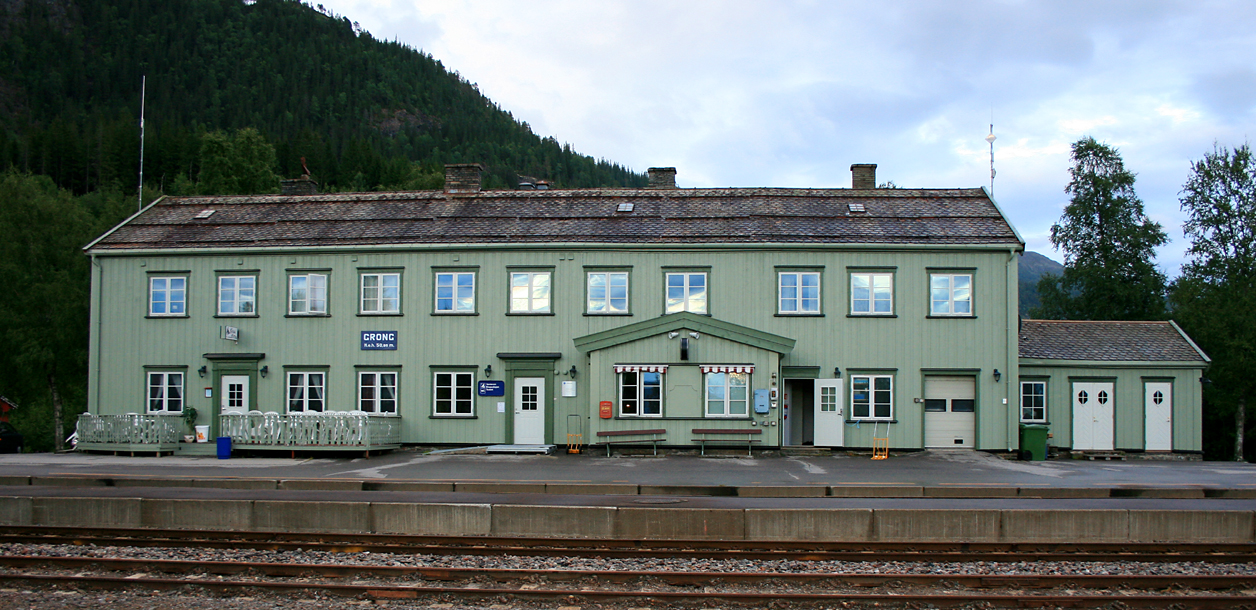
Grong Station

After Grong Station, which is located 219.54 kilometers (136.42 mi) from Trondheim Central Station and 50.9 meters (167 ft) above mean sea level (AMSL), the line runs over Tømmeråsfoss on the 45-meter-long (148 ft) Sanddøla Bridge and then over the 107-meter-long (351 ft) Røttesdal Vidaduct. The line then runs past Dun Station (3.31 km or 2.06 mi from Grong Station), before Sjemsvoll Station (6.30 km or 3.91 mi) and Jørem Station (9.37 km or 5.82 mi). Next the line reaches Øyheim Station (11.99 km or 7.45 mi), which has a passing loop. The line then passes into Overhalla and continues to Øysletta Station (11.99 km or 7.45 mi), before crossing to the north shore Namsen on the 195-meter-long (640 ft) Bertnem Bridge.

It passes Heknbakk Station (19.08 km or 11.86 mi) before Skogmo, where there is an industrial spur. This is the end of the part of the line which remains open to traffic. The line then reaches Skogmo Station (22.22 km or 13.81 mi), which has a passing loop. It then crosses Namsen on the 89-meter-long (292 ft) Bjøra Bridge and reaches Himo Station (44.92 km or 27.91 mi). The line then reaches Overhalla Station (25.58 km or 15.89 mi), which has a passing loop and serves the municipal center of Ranemsletta.

The line continues on a 54-meter-long (177 ft) bridge over Reina before reaching Barlia Station (27.07 km or 16.82 mi), Øysvoll Station (29.88 km or 18.57 mi), Myrmo Station (32.44 km or 20.16 mi) and Halvardsmo Station (35.11 km or 21.82 mi). An industrial spur then branches off before the main line reaches Skage Station (36.90 km or 22.93 mi), which has a passing loop. The line crosses a 56-meter-long (184 ft) bridge over Myrelven before passing through the 150-meter-long (490 ft) Bergeng Tunnel and the 29-meter-long (95 ft) Brudalsøy Tunnel.

Next the line reaches Grytøya Station (40.55 km or 25.20 mi) before running through the 46-meter-long (151 ft) Vika Tunnel. It continues past Kvatninga Station (43.41 km or 26.97 mi) and then over Moeosen on a 45-meter-long (148 ft) bridge. Next it reaches Meosen Station (44.47 km or 27.63 mi), Høyknes Station (48.02 km or 29.84 mi) and Angelskjæret Station (50.13 km or 31.15 mi). The line then runs through the 69-meter-long (226 ft) Hønhaugen I Tunnel and the 84-meter-long (276 ft) Hønhaugen II Tunnel. Originally the line went to the old Namsos Station (50.60 km or 31.44 mi from Grong and 2.8 meters (9 ft 2 in) AMSL), but since 1981, the line has been shortened to terminate at the new Namsos Station (51.61 km or 32.07 mi).

== Architecture ==
Because the line was built during the Great Depression and NSB was experiencing an operating loss for the first time in its history, minimal investments were made in stations and their facilities. The main architects were Gerhard Fischer and Bjarne F. Baastad, who both worked for the in-house NSB Arkitektkontor. The line's architecture is designed in Neoclassisism, and is, along with the Ålgård Line, the only line which employed this style consistently. Neoclassical architecture on other lines were only used for individual buildings.

Namsos Station was built in brick and also featured motive power depot. Overhalla Station was built in half-timbering. Both stations had hip roofs, and were the only stations to receive water towers, cargo expeditions and station master's residences. After complaints, also Skogmo, Skage and Øysletta Stations received cargo expeditions some years after the opening of the line. Most of the buildings were demolished after the line was closed for passenger traffic. Two buildings have been preserved by the Norwegian Directorate for Cultural Heritage. Fischer's wooden station building at Skage was preserved as a typical representation of the line's narrow and long buildings in Neoclassisism, and is also similar to the small stations built on the Numedal Line. Baastad's natural stone locomotive depot in Namsos has been preserved as the only remaining part of the original station environment in Namsos.

== History ==
=== Planning ===
Proposals for a railway to Namsos were first launched by Ole Tobias Olsen in 1872, who wanted a railway built from Trondheim to Nordland. In 1875, Nord-Trøndelag County Council established a committee to look into building a railway from Stjørdal to Namsos. A similar committee was established for a continuation through Nordland by Nordland County Council. At the time, the Meråker Line was under planning between Trondheim and Hell in Stjørdal, which opened in 1881. The Royal Railway Commission of 1875 mentioned a railway to Namsos in its report, but did not recommend that it be prioritized at the time. By the 1880s, Norway fell into recession and railway investments plummeted.

The original proposal called for a line directly from Steinkjer via Beitstad to Namsos and from there onwards to Nordland. In 1877, Grong Municipal Council considered for the first time the possibility of instead building the Nordland Line from Steinkjer via Snåsa to Grong and instead building a branch from Grong to Namsos. In 1884, Nord-Trøndelag County Council appointed a new committee to plan a railway from Stjørdal via Namsos to Vefsn. Building a railway to Namdalen was seen as important to ease export both of lumber, farm produce and seafood. The railway was also regarded as having a strategic importance for the postal service and the military, as transport times northwards would decrease significantly and be less affected by severe weather, which particularly during winter could hinder efficient steam ship transport.

In 1890, the county council supported that the first part of the Nordland Line, the Hell–Sunnan Line, which terminated at the outflow of the lake of Snåsavatnet, as there was consensus of route to that point. A public debate start about whether the Beitstad Line or Snåsa Line should be chosen, with all involved municipal councils being asked for their opinion ahead of the committee's 1889 report. The most vocal proponent of the Beitstad Line was Hans Konrad Foosnæs from Namdalseid, while Svend Matthiesen from Grong was the most vocal proponent of the Snåsa Line. In an 1892 report, a line from Trondheim via Beitstad to Namsos was estimated to be 212 kilometers (132 mi) long and would take 6 hours and 40 minutes. In comparison, the steam ships at the time used 16 hours.

During the 1890s, public meets were held throughout the area to rally support for public spending on the railway and for support for the most advantageous route for the local area. The Beitstad Line would run through areas with a population three to four times that of the Snåsa Line. All previous railway lines were built following the route which gave the most people a service, as this gave the best economic impact and would create more revenue for the railway, making it more profitable. Namsos was also the gateway to Nærøy Municipality and Vikna Municipality. On the other hand, the Snåsa Line would be 52 kilometers (32 mi) shorter. It was further argued that Beitstad did not need a railway as it was connected to the Trondheimsfjord and that a branch line to Namsos would be built anyway. All municipalities in Namdalen, except Grong, supported the Beitstad Line, while municipalities from Steinkjer and south supported the Snåsa Line.

In 1899, the cost of a line from Sunnan via Namsos to Grong would cost NOK 11.68 million and would be 122.5 kilometers (76.1 mi) long. Conversely, a line from Sunnan via Snåsa to Grong would cost NOK 6.59 million and would be 79.2 kilometers (49.2 mi) long. In addition, the branch from Grong to Namsos was estimated at 4.28 million and would be 48.4 kilometers (30.1 mi) long. Thus the Snåsa Line would be 4.1 kilometers (2.5 mi) shorter and 824,000 Norwegian krone cheaper. Both routes were based on municipal grants of NOK 500,000. In 1899, a county railway committee published its recommendation, with the majority of three members recommending the Snåsa Line, while the minority of two members recommended the Beitstad Line. In 1900, Trondheim Municipal Council promised to grant NOK 75,000 towards the Nordland Line on condition that it run via Snåsa.

Nord-Trøndelag County Council voted over the issue on 13 June 1900, with 18 votes for the Snåsa Line and 12 for the Beitstad Line. The same year, Nordland County Council voted in favor of the Snåsa Line. In Nordland there was unanimous support for the Snåsa Line, as they wanted the Nordland Line to be as short as possible. The Hell–Sunnan Line was completed to Sunnan and officially opened on 14 November 1905. From 25 July 1908, Stenkjær og Namsos Automobilselskap started a bus service from Steinkjer to Rødhammeren, with a ferry service onwards to Namsos.

From 1905, the government started work on financing several large railway projects, including the Dovre Line, the Rauma Line, the Sørlandet Line and the Nordland Line. On 10 June 1908, Parliament unanimously passed these lines in the Railway Plan of 1908, which included the 79-kilometer-long (49 mi) section from Sunnan via Snåsa to Grong, albeit without a branch to Namsos. The county stated that they would not grant any district funding to the line unless a branch to Namsos was also passed. This was a high-stake game, as Parliament could as a counter-measure decide to not built the line to Grong.

In 1912, the Ministry of Labour recommended that Parliament pass the Namsos Line on the north shore of Namsen and that Parliament demand 15 percent district grants from the county and the affected municipalities. The level of the district grants were subject to public debate, as they would affect the municipal finances for a long period. The same year, an additional proposal was made by the Norwegian Directorate of Mining, who wanted a railway from Namsos via Grong to Tunnsjøen, where pyrite mining was planned. The formal decision to build the line was taken by Parliament on 2 June 1913, although the route was not formalized by Parliament until 13 December 1923.

=== Construction ===
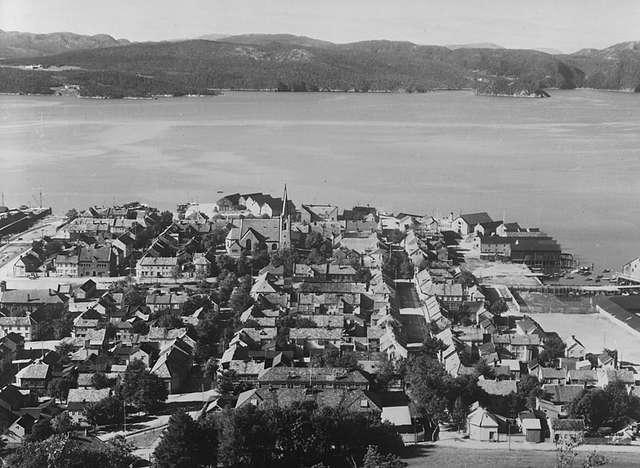
Namsos in 1938

Preliminary surveying started in 1916, but was, in part because of lack of workforce, not completed until 1922. The first construction ran through the winter of 1921 and 1922 as a public relief works program. Regular, and better paid, work started in 1923. By the last quarter of 1924, the workforce had reached 332 men, but as the economy and thus funding dropped, the work force was reduced, with a low of 116 men in 1928. By 1932, the relief aspect was back and the work force peaked at 540 men in 1932. Ordinary workers were paid an average NOK 1.64 per hour, while relief workers were paid an average NOK 1.24 per hour. In addition, the latter was paid between NOK 0.50 and 2.00 based on the number of people the supported. The wage differences were opposed by the trade union, who in 1923 demanded the same pay for the same work, which came into effect from that year.

In 1927, Minister of Labor Worm Hirsch Darre-Jenssen of the Conservative Party stopped construction of the line. He stated that time had run from the line, and that instead a "good road" should be built between Grong and Namsos. At the time of the decision, about half the earthwork and three-quarters of the blasting was concluded. Three tunnels were completed and 7 kilometers (4.3 mi) of the line were ready for tracks to be laid. All eight station buildings were under construction and the residences were completed. The only area which was largely uncompleted were the bridges, of which all but one of the fourteen were not built. It was estimated that the termination would save NOK 6.5 million in construction costs.

This resulted in an uproar among local politicians, who in unison stated that cars were not a suitable means of transport, particularly for freight. They further stated that the investments would have been wasted and that the state would have to compensate the area with additional infrastructure, such as a NOK 400,000 upgrade to the road between Gartland and Høylandet and NOK 300,000 to Nes Bridge. Parliament intervenes and passed legislation pm 19 May 1928 for construction to continue. However, this involved a reduction of the line's standard. The most drastic reduction was a reduction in the rail profile from 35 to 25 kilograms per meter (70 to 50 lb/yd) and the choice of used track. In addition, the line was equipped with ballast of gravel rather than crushed stone. Both contributed in giving a lower axle load, resulting in only lighter locomotives being able to use the line and reducing train sizes.

In early 1932, there were plans to reduce annual grants of the line by NOK 1 million, which would delay opening from the planned 1934 to 1936. However, this was not carried through. The line opened for temporary traffic on 1 November 1933, although regular service did not start until 1 July 1934.

=== Operations ===
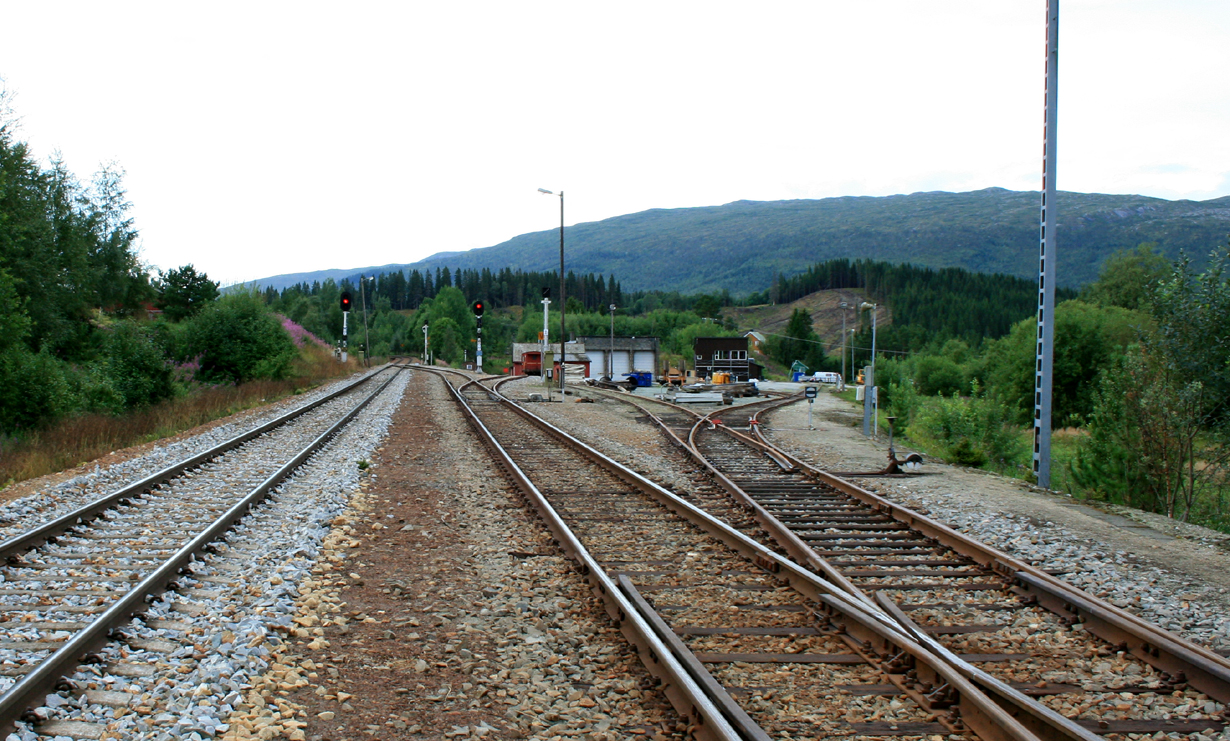
The Namsos Line (right) branches off from the Nordland Line (left) at Grong Station

From the opening, the line had two daily services in each direction, although shortly afterwards this was increased to four daily services per direction, including direct services to Trondheim. The line normally had a combined three Class 18 and Class 21 steam locomotives stationed on it. During the Second World War, the service was again reduced to two daily pairs of trains. Namsos was bombed during the Namsos Campaign in 1940, after which a new station building had to be built. From 1945, three daily train pairs were introduced. From 1950 to 1952, a diesel multiple unit direct service to Trondheim was started. However, by 1952, the number of trains was again reduced to three.

During the 1950s, the traffic situation became part of the public debate, as NSB suggested to close traffic on the line. The issue was related to the choice of building the line via Grong instead of directly from Steinkjer. Southwards, which had most of the traffic, the railway was 67 kilometers (42 mi) longer than National Road 17, which runs via Beitstad. Through the 1950s, buses took most of the traffic from Namsos southwards, leaving only local traffic within Namdalen on the line. From the mid-1950s, an Skb 201 shunter, later designated Skd 206 after it received a diesel engine, was stationed at Namsos Station. From 1955 to 1960, only two daily train pairs were run, after which it was changed back to three until passenger transport ceased. In 1960, the steam locomotives were retired and all passenger services were taken over with multiple units. normally consisting of a single car. At first Class 87 units were used, but from 1962, the larger Class 86 units were put into service. Steam locomotives were retired from ordinary revenue use from 1965, although one Class 21e remained in reserve until 15 January 1971.

Another problem with the line was that it, as a child of a parliamentary compromise, was built with lower standard than was common on railways at the time. Although the route was good, the use of gravel ballast and substandard rails, resulting in a low axle load. This reduced the line's potential for freight and reduced traffic. In 1976, Parliament passed and upgrade to the line, costing NOK 10 million. Used 35 kg/m rails were laid, increasing the permitted axle load to 18 tonnes (18 long tons; 20 short tons) and the speed to 65 kilometers per hour (40 mph). However, the speed was later reduced to 55 kilometers per hour (34 mph). Trains with an axle load of 20.5 tonnes (20.2 long tons; 22.6 short tons) were also permitted, given that they operate at a maximum 45 kilometers per hour (28 mph). However, passenger trains were terminated after 31 December 1977. Following the closing of the line, the service was taken as a bus route operated by Fylkesbilene i Nord-Trøndelag.

Following the closing of the passenger traffic, most station buildings were demolished, including Sjemsvoll Station 1979 and Overhalla Station in 1987. Only Øysvoll Station, Kvatningen Station and the freight house at Skage Station remain. From 1978, Di 2 diesel-hydraulic locomotives were taken into use for freight trains. However, they were too stiff for the tracks, and instead Di 5 diesel-hydraulic locomotives were introduced. They also proved unsatisfactory, resulting in the larger Di 3 diesel-electric locomotives being introduced.

After passenger traffic was terminated, the municipality wanted to use the centrally located railway station in Namsos for other uses, resulting in the terminus in Namsos being moved. This also resulted in the line being shortened with 1.01 kilometers (0.63 mi). The new terminus was taken into use on 1 June 1981, and the old station demolished within the same summer. The only building which remains is the locomotive depot, which no longer is connected to the tracks. Because of the urban redevelopment of the area, it is difficult to see where the tracks once lay. From the 1980s, an Skd 220 shunter was stationed in Namsos.

By 1994, all the traffic which remained was four weekly local freight trains, normally hauled with Di 3. From 1 December 1996, the ownership of the line was transferred to the Norwegian National Rail Administration. In 1997, the National Rail Administration proposed demolishing several closed railways, and stated that they would only retain maintenance of the Namsos Line until 2002. By 2000, the only regular user of the line was Namdal Mølle og Kornsilo, a grain silo in Namsos. In 2003, local musician Bjarne Brøndbo started renting out draisines on the line. Based at Namsos Camping, 15 kilometers (9.3 mi) of the track is available for use. During the construction of the Namsos Bridge, the Norwegian Public Roads Administration attempted to demolish 120 meters (390 ft) of the line in downtown Namsos. This was protested by the National Rail Administration, who stated that only Parliament could close a railway.

As part of the 2007 local election, the Labour Party proposed that the line be demolished. The same year, the National Rail Administration stated that, after the Horten Line, the Namsos Line was the most likely line to have the tracks removed. In 2008, Namsos was considered as a port for shipping out minerals from Namsskogan. This would require a major overhaul of the line, if the mining company were to choose Namsos instead of Mosjøen. The upgrade would have cost between NOK 150 and 250 million and taken one year. A decision to reopen the line for permanent operation would have to be taken by Parliament. The initial need for transport was 200,000 tonnes per year. In June 2009, the National Rail Administration stated that they would not continue to work on plans to re-open the line, as it was considerably cheaper to use the Nordland Line to Mosjøen than to cover the costs to reopen the Namsos Line. However, the mining company, Heli Utvikling, stated that should they increase their production to the planned 1.5 million tonnes per year, they would again consider Namsos.
