= Skogmo =

Village in Overhalla Municipality, Norway

- Village
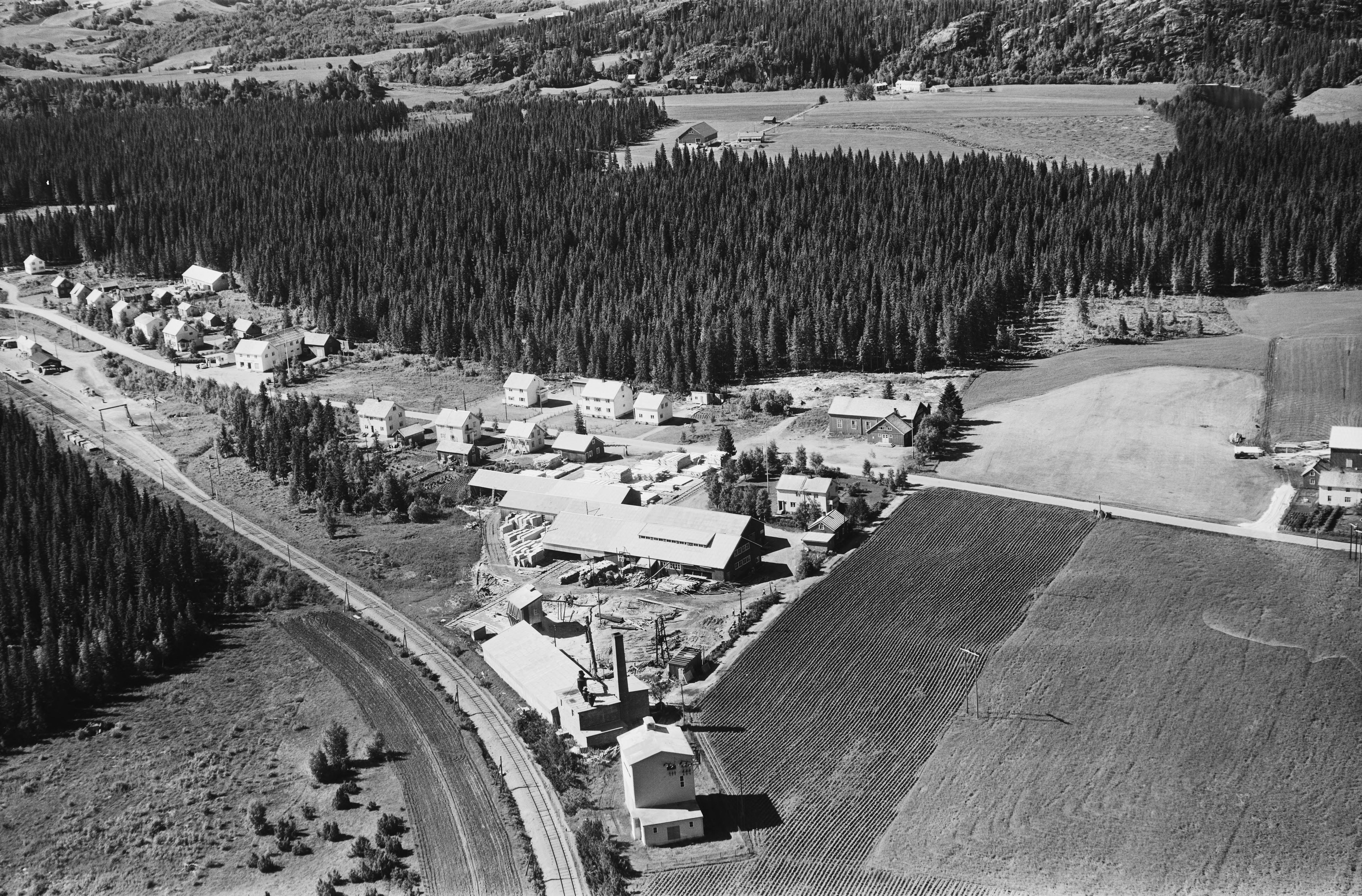
- View of the village
- Interactive map of Skogmo
- Location within Trøndelag Location within Norway
- Coordinates: 64.5084°N 12.0129°E
- Country: Norway
- Region: Central Norway
- County: Trøndelag
- District: Namdalen
- Municipality: Overhalla Municipality

Area
  - Total: 0.57 km^{2} (0.22 sq mi)
- Elevation: 28 m (92 ft)

Population (2024)
  - Total: 285
  - Density: 500/km^{2} (1,300/sq mi)
- Time zone: UTC+01:00 (CET)
  - Summer (DST): UTC+02:00 (CEST)
- Post Code: 7863 Overhalla

Skogmo is a village in Overhalla Municipality in Trøndelag county, Norway. It is located along the Norwegian County Road 17, about 4 kilometres (2.5 mi) northeast of the municipal centre, Ranemsletta. The village lies just north of the river Namsen and about 5 kilometres (3.1 mi) southwest of the lake Eidsvatnet.

The 0.57-square-kilometre (140-acre) village has a population (2024) of 285 and a population density of 500 inhabitants per square kilometre (1,300/sq mi).
