= Ranemsletta =

Village in Overhalla Municipality, Norway

- Village
- Interactive map of Ranemsletta
- Location within Trøndelag Location within Norway
- Coordinates: 64.4936°N 11.9484°E
- Country: Norway
- Region: Central Norway
- County: Trøndelag
- District: Namdalen
- Municipality: Overhalla Municipality

Area
  - Total: 0.47 km^{2} (0.18 sq mi)
- Elevation: 22 m (72 ft)

Population (2024)
  - Total: 532
  - Density: 1,132/km^{2} (2,930/sq mi)
- Time zone: UTC+01:00 (CET)
  - Summer (DST): UTC+02:00 (CEST)
- Post Code: 7863 Overhalla

Ranemsletta is the administrative centre of Overhalla Municipality in Trøndelag county, Norway. The village is located on the north shore of the river Namsen, along the Norwegian County Road 17 which connects it to the town of Namsos to the west and Grong Municipality to the east. The villages of Svalia and Skogmo are neighboring villages to the north and northeast.

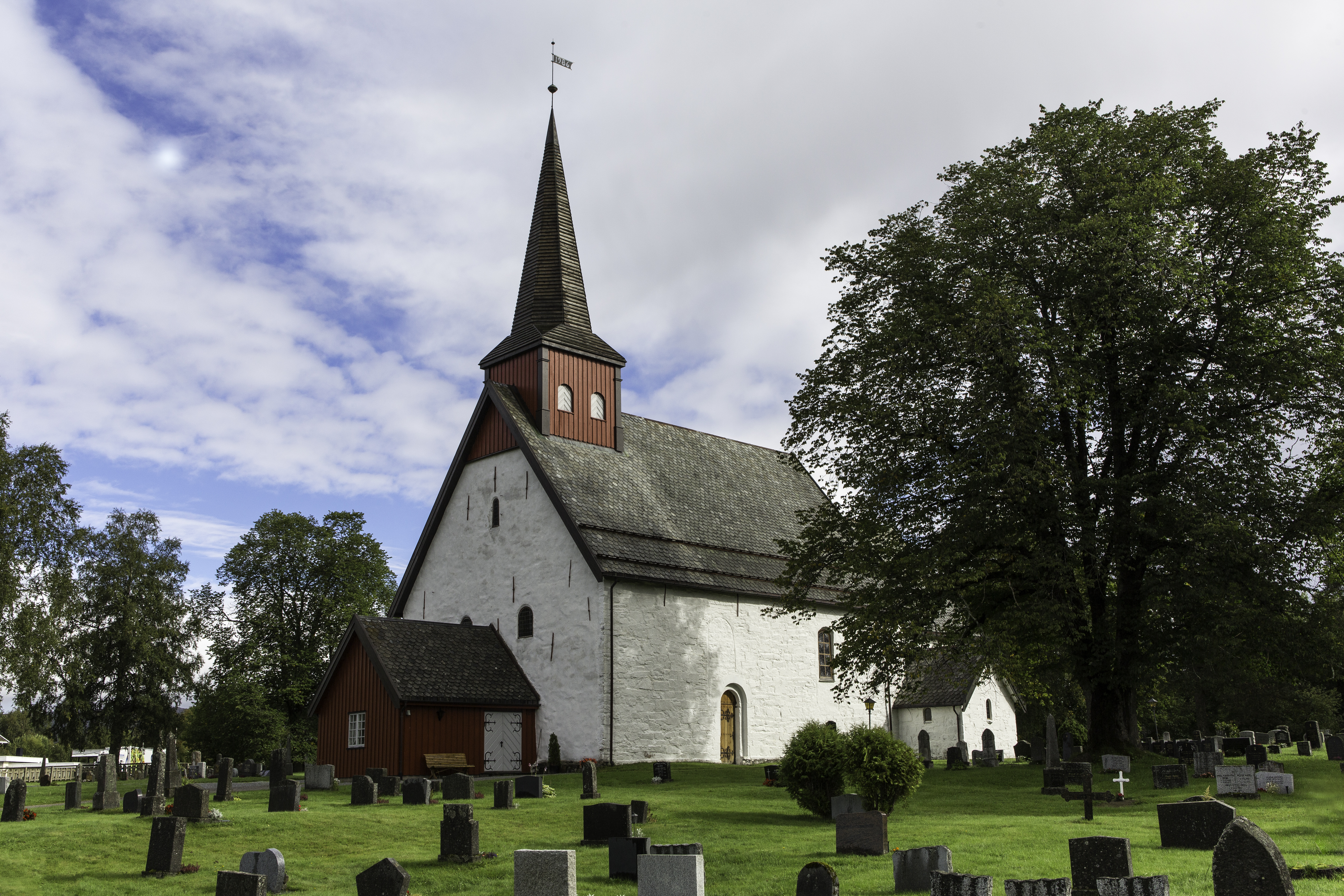
View of the Ranem Church

The village has some industry, a cement factory, a high school, and the historic Ranem Church. The now-defunct Namsos Line railway used to run through the village.

The 0.47-square-kilometre (120-acre) village has a population (2024) of 532 and a population density of 1,132 inhabitants per square kilometre (2,930/sq mi).
