= Høylandet =

Høylandet (a Norwegian word meaning the highlands) may refer to:

== Places ==
- Høylandet Municipality, a municipality in Trøndelag county, Norway
- Høylandet (village), a village in Høylandet Municipality in Trøndelag county, Norway
- Høylandet Church, a church in Høylandet Municipality in Trøndelag county, Norway
- Høylandet School, a school in Høylandet Municipality in Trøndelag county, Norway

== See also ==
- Høilandet (disambiguation), an old-fashioned spelling of Høylandet
