= Mørkved (surname) =

Mørkved is a surname. Notable people with the surname include:

- Albert Andreas Mørkved (1898–1990), Norwegian lawyer, judge and politician
- Ann Iren Mørkved (born 1981), Norwegian footballer
- Knut Mørkved (1938–2017), Norwegian diplomat
- Lorents Mørkved (1844–1924), Norwegian politician
- Salamon Mørkved (1891–1978), Norwegian politician
