= Almåsgrønningen =

Lake in Trøndelag, Norway

- Interactive map of Almåsgrønningen
- Location: Høylandet Municipality, Trøndelag
- Coordinates: 64.6821°N 12.2144°E
- Primary outflows: Eidsåa river
- Basin countries: Norway
- Max. length: 3.6 kilometres (2.2 mi)
- Max. width: 3 kilometres (1.9 mi)
- Surface area: 3.8 km^{2} (1.5 sq mi)
- Shore length^{1}: 13.48 kilometres (8.38 mi)
- Surface elevation: 203 metres (666 ft)
- References: NVE
- ^{1} Shore length is not a well-defined measure.

Almåsgrønningen is a lake in Høylandet Municipality in Trøndelag county, Norway. The 3.8-square-kilometre (1.5 sq mi) lake lies about 10 kilometres (6.2 mi) northwest of the village of Høylandet, between the lakes Øyvatnet and Storgrønningen.

== See also ==
- List of lakes in Norway
