= Hans Barlien =

Norwegian politician

Hans Andersen Barlien (29 February 1772 – 31 October 1842) was a Norwegian farmer and politician. He has been credited with the establishment of a Norwegian-American immigrant settlement in Sugar Creek, Iowa.

== Personal life ==
Barlien was born on 29 February 1772 in Overhalla, Nordre Trondheim county, Norway, to Anders Sørensen and Ane Hansdatter. On 24 November 1793, he married Kjerstine Einarsdatter Skistad (b. 1768) in Overhalla, daughter of Einar Skistad and Marie Sophie Christensdatter (1808–1897) in Sugar Creek, Iowa. Barlien was grandfather to Norwegian engineer Albert Fenger-Krog (1835–1904) and Norwegian politician Hans Konrad Foosnæs (1846–1917).

== Early career ==
At the same time as his 1793 marriage, Barlien took over one of the Barli farms of Trondheim Cathedral. The parish priest Hans Blytt (1758–1805), together with Barlien, was the very first to provide vaccinations against smallpox in Norway. Blytt had imported lymph from Copenhagen and vaccinated first his own children, then members of the Barlien family.

In May 1804 Hans Barlien moved with his wife and four children to Trondheim, where he bought a pottery located on Prinsens gate. He was later licensed as a watchmaker. Barlien was eager to improve the city's water supply, and initiated a new pump station and glass works on the farm Surviken, working together with Haugeans Otto Carlsen and Paul Anziøn. Barlien received the Dannebrogmændenes Hæderstegn on 28 June 1809 for his technological competence and skill. In 1812 Barlien bought the farm Ågård in Namdalseid for 7000 Norwegian rigsdaler, where he built and experimented with a gliding aircraft.

== Political career ==
Barlien entered politics in 1814. He did not become a member of the Constituent Assembly, but was elected as a representative from Nordre Trondheim during the session 1815–1816 which became his only term in office. He was the only politician with farmer background who was represented in Lagtinget. The regulation of Norway's monetary system was the most important political issue that the Parliament dealt with in the 1815–16 period, and Barlien gave his point of view in a publication named Anmærkninger betræffende Pengevæsenet. En Nationalsag. Barlien wanted to maintain the Eidsvoll Warranty, claiming that "each citizen of the state, should, in relation to fortune, participate in the compliance of the Warranty". (Note: Norwegian: Rigsforsamlingen har besluttet, og Kongen har sanctioneret Beslutningen, nemlig: at enhver Statens Borger, skal, i Forhold til Formue, deeltage i Garantiens Overholdelse)

He was not reelected in the 1818 election. His liberal political and religious views had often put him at odds with both the clergy and the establishment. He could not run in 1820 or 1824 because of an ongoing trial against him. In an article in the periodical Det norske Nationalblad, Barlien presented his views on Norwegian constitutional law and his experiences as an MP. In that article, Barlien stated that the Norwegian people were the "producing and fabricating part of the state members". (Note: Norwegian: den producerende og fabrikerende Deel af Statens Medlemmer)

== Immigration and legacy ==
In the year 1837 Hans Barlien emigrated from Norway to the United States. 21.June 1837 Barlien left Christiania on the steamboat "Prinds Carl" and headed to Gothenburg and later Copenhagen. He traveled in July 1837 to the United States, arriving about the middle of September 1837. The exact dates and route is still unknown. He subsequently visited the Fox River settlement of Norwegian immigrants in LaSalle County, Illinois. In 1838 he lived in St. Louis, Missouri and in late 1839 or early 1840, Hans Barlien is attributed with being the founder of the first Norwegian immigrant settlement in the state of Iowa, at Sugar Creek in Lee County. On 31 October 1842 he died in Sugar Creek, Iowa.

In 1891, a memorial obelisk in honor of Hans Barlien was erected in Overhalla Municipality near Namsos. The street Hans Barliens gate in Oslo is named for Hans Barlien.

== Publications ==
- Anmerkninger betræffende Pengevæsenet. En Nationalsag, 1815
- Om Norriges Grundlov, Repræsentation og Valgene, in Det norske Nationalblad, hf. 7, pp. 232–8
- Bemærkninger til Norges Grundlov, Overgaard (Årgård) 1830
- Melkeveien, 4 no., Overgård 1830
- Bemærkninger til det nye Lovudkast dat. 31. Oct. 1831, Trondheim 1833

== Other sources ==
- Flom, George T. (1909) A History of Norwegian Immigration to the United States (Iowa City, Ia.)
- Norlie, Olaf M. (1925) History of the Norwegian People in America (Minneapolis, MN: Augsburg Publishing House)
