= Vassbotna =

Village in Høylandet Municipality, Norway

- Village
- Interactive map of Vassbotna
- Location within Trøndelag Location within Norway
- Coordinates: 64.5549°N 12.1864°E
- Country: Norway
- Region: Central Norway
- County: Trøndelag
- District: Namdalen
- Municipality: Høylandet Municipality
- Elevation: 15 m (49 ft)
- Time zone: UTC+01:00 (CET)
  - Summer (DST): UTC+02:00 (CEST)
- Post Code: 7977 Høylandet

Vassbotna is a village in the southern part of Høylandet Municipality in Trøndelag county, Norway. The village is located on an isthmus between the lakes Eidsvatnet and Grungstadvatnet, about 11 kilometres (6.8 mi) southwest of the village of Høylandet and about 11 kilometres (6.8 mi) northeast of the village of Skogmo (in neighboring Overhalla Municipality). Drageid Church is located in this village, and it serves the people in the southern part of Høylandet Municipality.
