= Øyvatnet =

Lake in Trøndelag, Norway

- Interactive map of the lake
- Location: Høylandet Municipality, Trøndelag
- Coordinates: 64.7287°N 12.3328°E
- Basin countries: Norway
- Max. length: 7.5 kilometres (4.7 mi)
- Max. width: 2 kilometres (1.2 mi)
- Surface area: 9.74 km^{2} (3.76 sq mi)
- Shore length^{1}: 25.18 kilometres (15.65 mi)
- Surface elevation: 65 metres (213 ft)
- References: NVE
- ^{1} Shore length is not a well-defined measure.

Øyvatnet is a lake in Høylandet Municipality in Trøndelag county, Norway. The 9.74-square-kilometre (3.76 sq mi) lake lies about 7.5 kilometres (4.7 mi) north of the village of Høylandet and about 15 kilometres (9.3 mi) south of the village of Kongsmoen.

== See also ==
- List of lakes in Norway
