= Salamon Mørkved =

Norwegian forester and politician (1891–1978)

Salamon Mørkved (27 September 1891 – 30 June 1978) was a Norwegian forester and politician for the Liberal Party.

== Personal life ==
He was born in Høylandet Municipality as a son of Lorents Mørkved (1844–1924) and Sofie Aavatsmark (1850–1935). He was a nephew of Ivar Aavatsmark and brother-in-law of Albert Fredrik Eggen.

In 1919 he married Inga Bertha Aavatsmark (1892–1967), a daughter of farmers Andreas Hammer (1849–1918) and Bereth Aavatsmark (1852–1925). They resided at Spillum.

== Career ==
Mørkved finished folk high school (1909), forester school (1911), commerce school (1912) before enrolling in higher education, graduating in forestry from the Norwegian College of Agriculture in 1917. He was hired as a forest manager in Namdal Aktiedampsag & Høvleri in 1918, then as timber director in Namdalsbruket in 1920. From 1934 he was the manager and owner of Spillumbruket. He chaired Namdal Forestry Society from 1941 to 1961 and was a board member of the Norwegian Forestry Society from 1942 to 1960.

While working for Namdalsbruket, Mørkved was elected to the municipal council of Namsos Municipality from 1927 to 1934. He was later elected to the municipal council from Klinga Municipality from 1946 to 1950. He also served as public trustee here from 1948 to 1962.

Mørkved also chaired Klinga Sparebank from 1945 to 1962 and Den Nordenfjeldske Trelastforening. He was a board member of Namsos Sparebank from 1936 to 1963, and supervisory council member of Namdal Dampskibsselskab from 1935 to 1963 and Det norske gjensidige Skogbrandforsikringsselskap.

He was decorated with the King's Medal of Merit in gold. He died in June 1978 and was buried in Namsos.
