= Albert Fredrik Eggen =

Norwegian politician

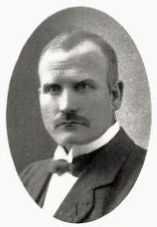
Albert Fredrik Eggen

Albert Fredrik Eggen (29 September 1878 – Levanger, 6 April 1966) was a Norwegian farmer and politician for the Liberal Party.

He was born at Østborg in Levanger landsogn as a son of farmer and petty officer Martin Gunerius Eggen (1839–1917) and his wife Karen Bergitte Maritvold (1853–1882). He graduated from middle school in 1896, Mære Agricultural School in 1896 and the Norwegian College of Agriculture in 1900. He was the county agronomist in Nordre Trondhjems Amt from September 1900. He was the county secretary for agriculture from 1919. In 1910 he bought the farm Forset in Stod, where he later lived. He was a board member of Norske Melkeprodusenters Landsforbund from 1927 to 1928 and Trøndelag Melkesentral from 1930 to 1932. From 1926 he was a supervisory council member of the Royal Norwegian Society for Development.

He was elected as a member of the municipal council of Stod Municipality, and served as mayor there from 1923 to 1925 and 1938 to 1940. In 1938 he chaired the county council, which at that time consisted of the mayors.

In 1915 he stood for election to the Parliament of Norway in the constituency of Snaasen for the Norwegian Agrarian Association, at the time a caucus within the Liberal Party. In the first round he carried 606 votes, and ended third behind Ivar Aavatsmark and K. A. Jensen. In the second round he finished fourth, now also beaten by Hans Konrad Foosnæs. In 1918 he was chosen as the running mate of Aavatsmark. They won, and he served as a deputy representative to Parliament of Norway during the term 1919–1921. During parts of the period he met as a regular representative in the Standing Committee on the Military, filling in for Aavatsmark who was a member of Knudsen's Second Cabinet and Blehr's Second Cabinet.

He was married to Marie Mørkved (1884–1965), a daughter of mayor Lorents Mørkved. Their daughter Marit Odlaug Eggen (1915–2008) married physicist Otto Øgrim, and had the son Tron Øgrim. Eggen died in 1966, and was buried in Stod.
