= Kongsmo Chapel =

Church in Trøndelag, Norway

- Kongsmo kapell
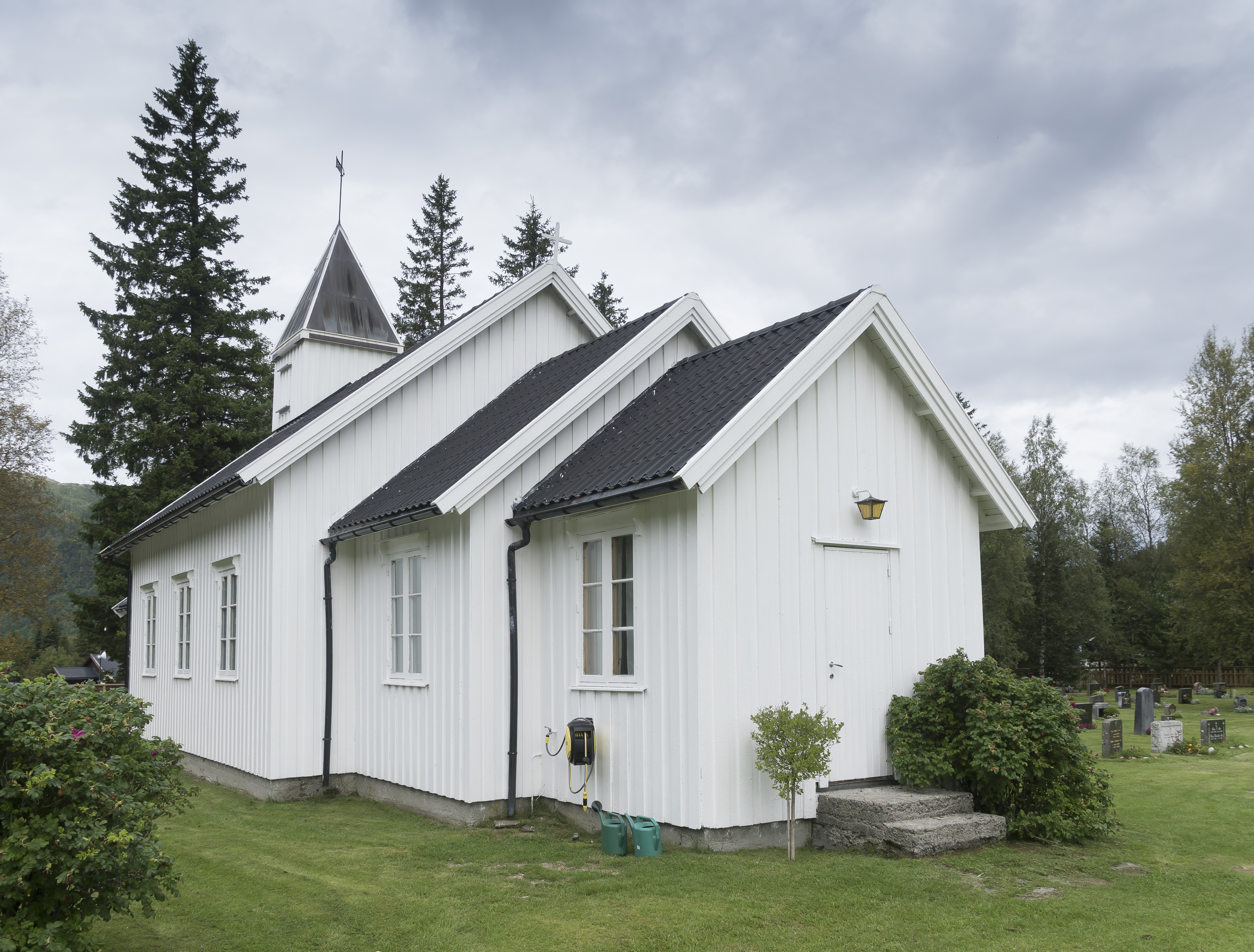
- View of the chapel
- Kongsmo Chapel
- 64.88491162°N 12.438424319°E
- Location: Høylandet Municipality, Trøndelag
- Country: Norway
- Denomination: Church of Norway
- Churchmanship: Evangelical Lutheran

History
- Status: Chapel
- Founded: 1937
- Consecrated: 1937

Architecture
- Functional status: Active
- Architect: Simon Fuglstad
- Architectural type: Long church
- Completed: 1937 (89 years ago)

Specifications
- Capacity: 110
- Materials: Wood

Administration
- Diocese: Nidaros bispedømme
- Deanery: Namdal prosti
- Parish: Høylandet
- Norwegian Cultural Heritage Site
- Type: Church
- Status: Not protected
- ID: 84814

Kongsmo Chapel (Norwegian: Kongsmo kapell) is a chapel of the Church of Norway in Høylandet Municipality in Trøndelag county, Norway. It is located in the village of Kongsmoen in the northern part of the municipality. It is an annex chapel for the Høylandet parish which is part of the Namdal prosti (deanery) in the Diocese of Nidaros. The white, wooden church was built in a long church style in 1937 using plans drawn up by the architect Simon Fuglstad. The church seats about 110 people.

== See also ==
- List of churches in Nidaros
