= Ivar Aavatsmark (forester) =

Norwegian businessman

Ivar Aavatsmark (2 October 1916, Høylandet Municipality – 29 August 2004) was a Norwegian corporate executive and forester from Høylandet Municipality. He was director of the Norwegian Forest Owners Association for forty years, between 1942 and 1982. He was one of the architects behind the Norske Skog corporation that was started by the association. He died in 2004.
