= Drageid Chapel =

Church in Trøndelag, Norway

- Drageid kapell
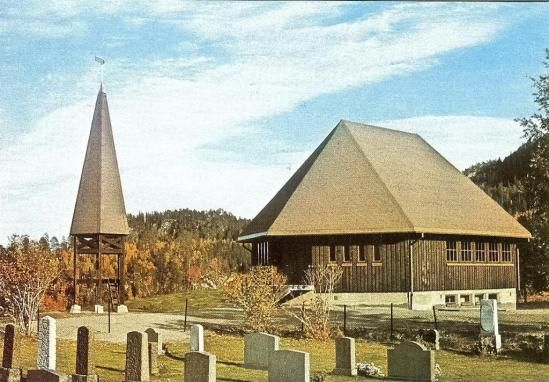
- View of the church
- Drageid Chapel
- 64.55691478°N 12.18369144°E
- Location: Høylandet Municipality, Trøndelag
- Country: Norway
- Denomination: Church of Norway
- Churchmanship: Evangelical Lutheran

History
- Status: Parish church
- Founded: 1976
- Consecrated: 1976

Architecture
- Functional status: Active
- Architect: Arne Aursand
- Architectural type: Hexagaonal
- Completed: 1976 (50 years ago)

Specifications
- Capacity: 90
- Materials: Wood

Administration
- Diocese: Nidaros bispedømme
- Deanery: Namdal prosti
- Parish: Høylandet
- Norwegian Cultural Heritage Site
- Type: Church
- Status: Not protected
- ID: 84032

Drageid Chapel (Norwegian: Drageid kapell) is a parish church of the Church of Norway in Høylandet Municipality in Trøndelag county, Norway. It is located in the village of Vassbotna, in the southern part of the municipality. It is one of the churches for the Høylandet parish which is part of the Namdal prosti (deanery) in the Diocese of Nidaros. The brown, hexagonal church was built in 1976 using plans drawn up by the architect Arne Aursand. The church seats about 90 people.

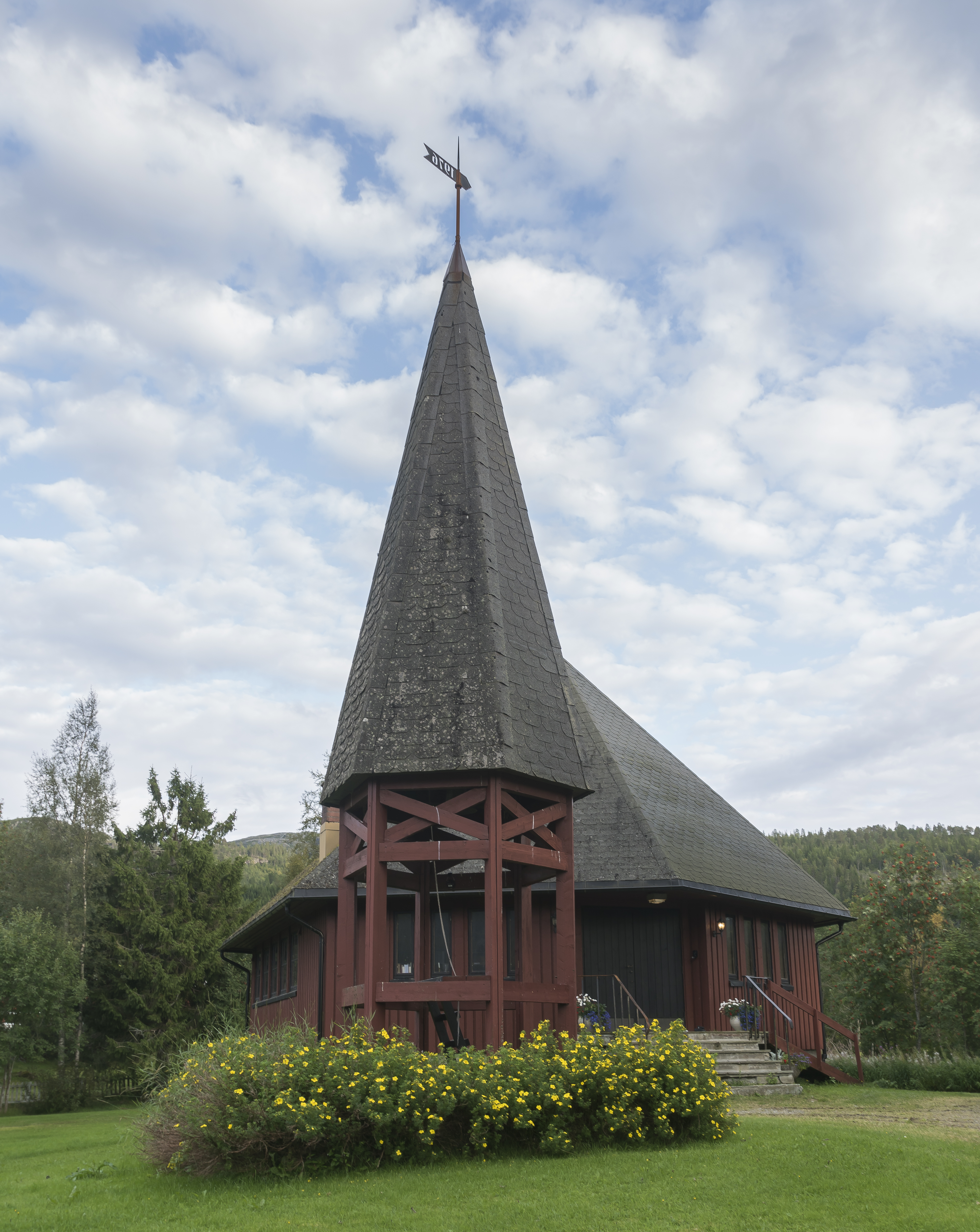
View of the steeple

The church has a free-standing steeple near the main entrance to the chapel.

== See also ==
- List of churches in Nidaros
