= Høilandet =

Høilandet is a Dano-Norwegian word meaning the highlands. It is the old name of:

- Høylandet Municipality, a municipality in Trøndelag county, Norway
- Hølonda Municipality, a former municipality in the old Sør-Trøndelag county, Norway (now a part of Melhus Municipality)

== See also ==
- Høyland Municipality, a former municipality in Rogaland county, Norway
