= Ivar Aavatsmark =

Norwegian politician (1864-1947)

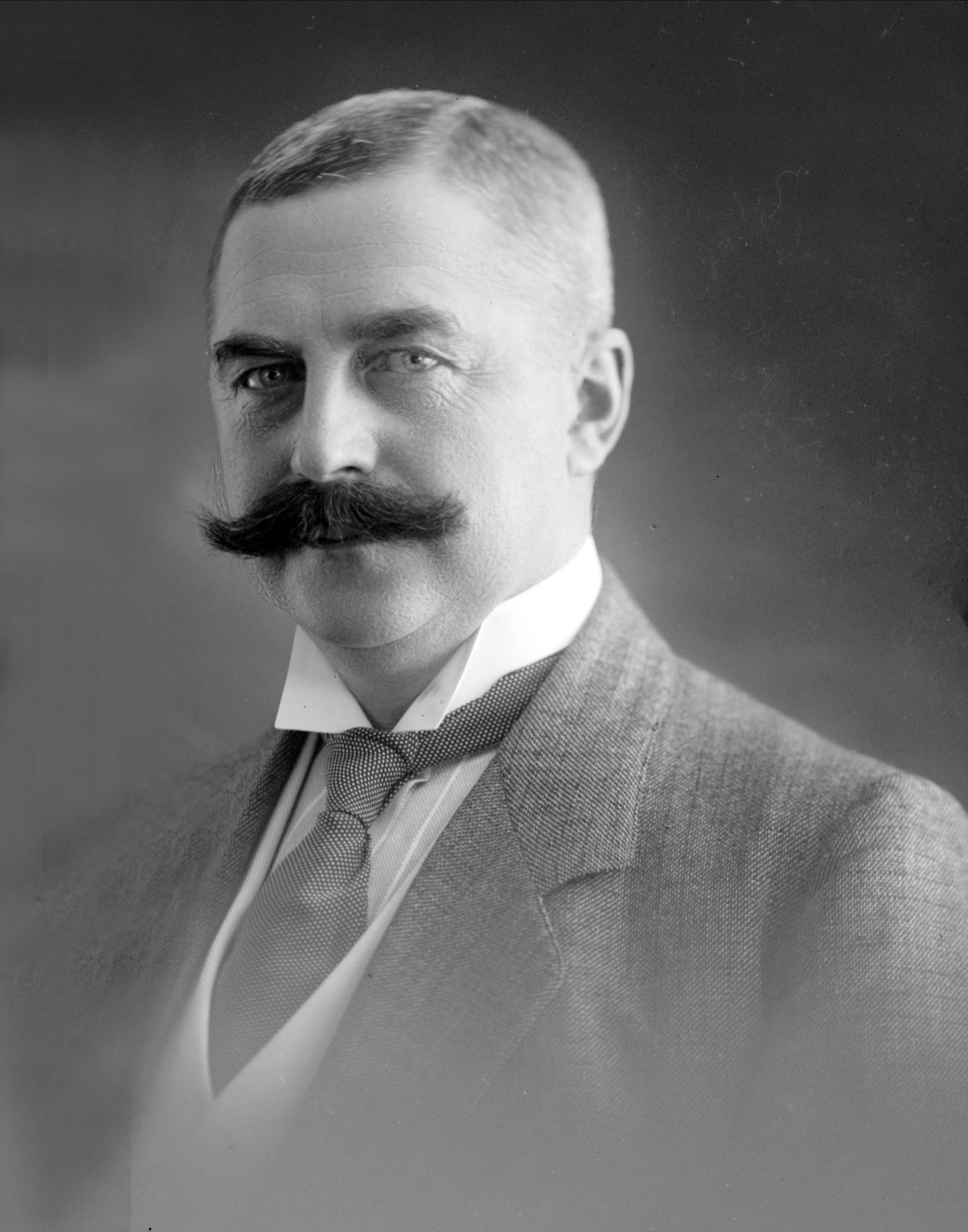

Member of the Norwegian Parliament
- In office 1 January 1907 – 31 December 1921
- Constituency: Snåsa

Minister of Defence
- In office 22 June 1921 – 6 March 1923
- Prime Minister: Otto Blehr
- Preceded by: Karl W. Wefring
- Succeeded by: Karl W. Wefring
- In office 17 June 1919 – 21 June 1920
- Prime Minister: Gunnar Knudsen
- Preceded by: Rudolf Peersen
- Succeeded by: Karl W. Wefring

Personal details
- Born: 11 December 1864 Høylandet Municipality, Nord-Trøndelag, United Kingdoms of Sweden and Norway
- Died: 1 July 1947 (aged 82) Oslo, Norway
- Party: Liberal
- Spouse: Ida Flodin (m. 1898)
- Relations: Ivar Aavatsmark (uncle)
- Children: Fanny; Armas; Laila

Military service
- Years of service: 1889–1928
- Rank: Major General
- Commands: 2nd Division

Ivar Aavatsmark (11 December 1864 – 1 July 1947) was a Norwegian officer and politician for the Liberal Party. He finished his military career in 1928, as major general, head of the 2nd Division and Commander of Akershus Fortress. As a politician he was a five-term MP between 1907 and 1921, and served as Minister of Defence from 1919 to 1920 and 1921 to 1923.

== Personal life ==
He was born at Aavatsmark in Høylandet Municipality as a son of farmers Anders Pedersen Aavatsmark (1820–1906) and Margrethe Salomonsdatter Mørkved (1821–1902). He was an uncle of the forester Ivar Aavatsmark and a first cousin of Ole Severin Aavatsmark and brother-in-law of Høylandet mayor Lorents Mørkved.

In November 1898 in Helsinki he married the singer Ida Emilia Basilier Flodin (1870–1957). She was a daughter of politician Frithiof Ferdinand Flodin and sister of Ida Basilier-Magelssen.

== Career ==
=== Military positions ===
He attended school in Namsos before finishing his secondary education at Trondhjem Cathedral School in 1886. He then took officer training at the Norwegian Military Academy, which he finished in 1889. He was promoted to premier lieutenant in 1890 and graduated from the Norwegian Military College in 1892. After one year in the King's Guard he was an aspirant in the general staff from 1894 to 1898. He was then promoted to captain, and after a period as an adjoint from 1900 to 1903 he was a teacher at the Norwegian Military College from 1903 to 1911. Following the death of his older brother he took over the family farm in Høylandet in 1904, and resided there from 1906 to 1911.

In 1911 he was promoted to lieutenant colonel, and leader of the Namdalen Battalion. In 1915 he was promoted to colonel, and leader of the Infantry Regiment 13. He was promoted to major general in 1919, and led the 5th Division in Trondhjem. From July 1928 to December 1932 he led the 2nd Division and served as commander of Akershus Fortress.

=== National politics ===
Aavatsmark was elected as a representative to the Parliament of Norway from the constituency of Snaasen in 1906, 1909, 1912, 1915 and 1918.

In 1906 he barely edged out contenders from his own party. In the first round of voting there were four Liberal candidates, with Aavatsmark taking the lead with 1,210 votes against incumbent six-term MP Hans Konrad Foosnæs' 1,145 votes. In the second round of voting, Aavatsmark took in his former contestant Ole Olsen Five as running mate and beat Foosnæs more comfortably with 2,157 votes against 1,476. In 1909 Aavatsmark's running mate was his own brother-in-law Mørkved, whereas his main opponent was partyfellow Thorvald Løchen with running mate Ole Langhammer. The contesting issue was the Nordland Line, and whether it should run through Snaasen or Beitstad. Aavatsmark fought for Snaasen, and won the seat already in the first round. In 1912, again with Mørkved as running mate, they won equally comfortably with 2,642 votes against Foosnæs' 1,513. The 1915 election was tougher, as Labour had grown in strength and their candidate was Aavatsmark's closest contender. In the first round, Aavatsmark (with Mørkved as running mate) won 2,169 votes. He carried the seat in the second round with 3,057 votes. In 1918 Aavatsmark's running mate was Albert Fredrik Eggen, who had fielded for the Agrarians in 1915.

In Parliament he chaired the Standing Committee on the Military for his last four terms. He served as Vice President of the Storting from 1917 to 1918, and then President of the Odelsting in 1919. He then served as Minister of Defence in Knudsen's Second Cabinet from 1919 to 1920 and in Blehr's Second Cabinet from 1921 to 1923.

His advancement from captain in early 1911 to major general in 1919 has been noted as one of the swiftest advancement in Norwegian military history. The cabinet probably placed Aavatsmark in his position to contain a possible socialist revolution in Trondhjem. He also carried through a secret provision that the King's Guard would not allow recruits who worked as industrial labourers. However, he was more willing to compromise with the left wing in Norwegian politics than several other generals, and kept his liberal stance throughout the 1930s. As a parliamentarian he is remembered for his work with the Defence Organisation of 1910 and the Naval Plan of 1912. Another major interest was railway expansion. Already in 1900 he traveled to the Kingdom of Austria on a scholarship to study military rail transport. He was one of the proponents of the Nordland Line.

=== Other positions and awards ===
He was a board member of the Det frivillige Skyttervesen and chaired the officers' union Hærens fastlønte Offiserers Landsforening from 1930 to 1934. In business and banking he chaired the board of Grong Gruber and was a supervisory council member of Norges Bank (1918–1930) and Trondhjems Sparebank (1925–1928). He was also a board member of Trondheims bys vel from 1924 to 1928 and Trondheim and Trøndelag Folk Museum from 1925 to 1928.

Aavatsmark was decorated as a Knight, First Class of the Order of St. Olav (1910), then promoted to Commander with Star in 1920. He held the Grand Cross of the Order of the Dannebrog, the Order of the White Rose of Finland and the Order of the Crown of Italy. He died in July 1947 in Oslo.
