= Ole Olsen Five =

Norwegian politician

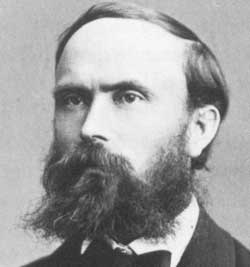
Ola Five

Ole Olsen Five (21 May 1846 – 26 April 1930) was a Norwegian teacher and politician for the Liberal Party.

He was born in Stod Municipality as a son of teacher, sexton and farmer Ole Larsen Sunde and Olava Andersdatter Kirkol. In 1876 he married Charlotte M. Elden (1850–1925).

He was a school teacher and principal by profession, and founded Folkevæbningen. He served as a deputy representative to the Parliament of Norway from Nordre Trondhjems Amt during the term 1892–1894, and served as a full representative during the term 1900–1903. In 1906 he stood for parliamentary election in the newly formed constituency Snaasen, challenged by no less than three other candidates from his own party; incumbent Hans Konrad Foosnæs, Ivar Aavatsmark and Lorents Mørkved. Mørkved ended fourth in the third round with only 698 votes. In the second round he was taken on board as Aavatsmark's running mate, and he was thereby elected for a new term as a deputy MP.
