= Storgrønningen =

Lake in Trøndelag, Norway

- Interactive map of the lake
- Location: Overhalla Municipality and Høylandet Municipality, Trøndelag
- Coordinates: 64.6324°N 12.1182°E
- Primary outflows: Flyåa
- Basin countries: Norway
- Max. length: 6.7 kilometres (4.2 mi)
- Max. width: 1.2 kilometres (0.75 mi)
- Surface area: 5.45 km^{2} (2.10 sq mi)
- Shore length^{1}: 21.3 kilometres (13.2 mi)
- Surface elevation: 160 metres (520 ft)
- References: NVE
- ^{1} Shore length is not a well-defined measure.

Storgrønningen is a lake in Høylandet Municipality in Trøndelag county, Norway. The extreme southern tip of the lake crosses over the border into Overhalla Municipality. The lake lies about 7.5 kilometres (4.7 mi) west of the village of Høylandet and about 4 kilometres (2.5 mi) southeast of the mountain Grønningfjella.

== See also ==
- List of lakes in Norway
