= Kongsmoen =

Village in Høylandet Municipality, Norway

- Village
- Interactive map of Kongsmoen
- Location within Trøndelag Location within Norway
- Coordinates: 64.8817°N 12.4346°E
- Country: Norway
- Region: Central Norway
- County: Trøndelag
- District: Namdalen
- Municipality: Høylandet Municipality
- Elevation: 20 m (66 ft)
- Time zone: UTC+01:00 (CET)
  - Summer (DST): UTC+02:00 (CEST)
- Post Code: 7976 Kongsmoen

Kongsmoen is a village in the northern part of Høylandet Municipality in Trøndelag county, Norway. The village is located at the innermost point at the end of the Foldafjord, about 20 kilometres (12 mi) east of the village of Foldereid and about 30 kilometres (19 mi) north of the village of Høylandet. Prior to 1964, the Kongsmoen area was part of Foldereid Municipality. Kongsmo Chapel is located in this village, and it serves the people in the northern part of Høylandet Municipality.

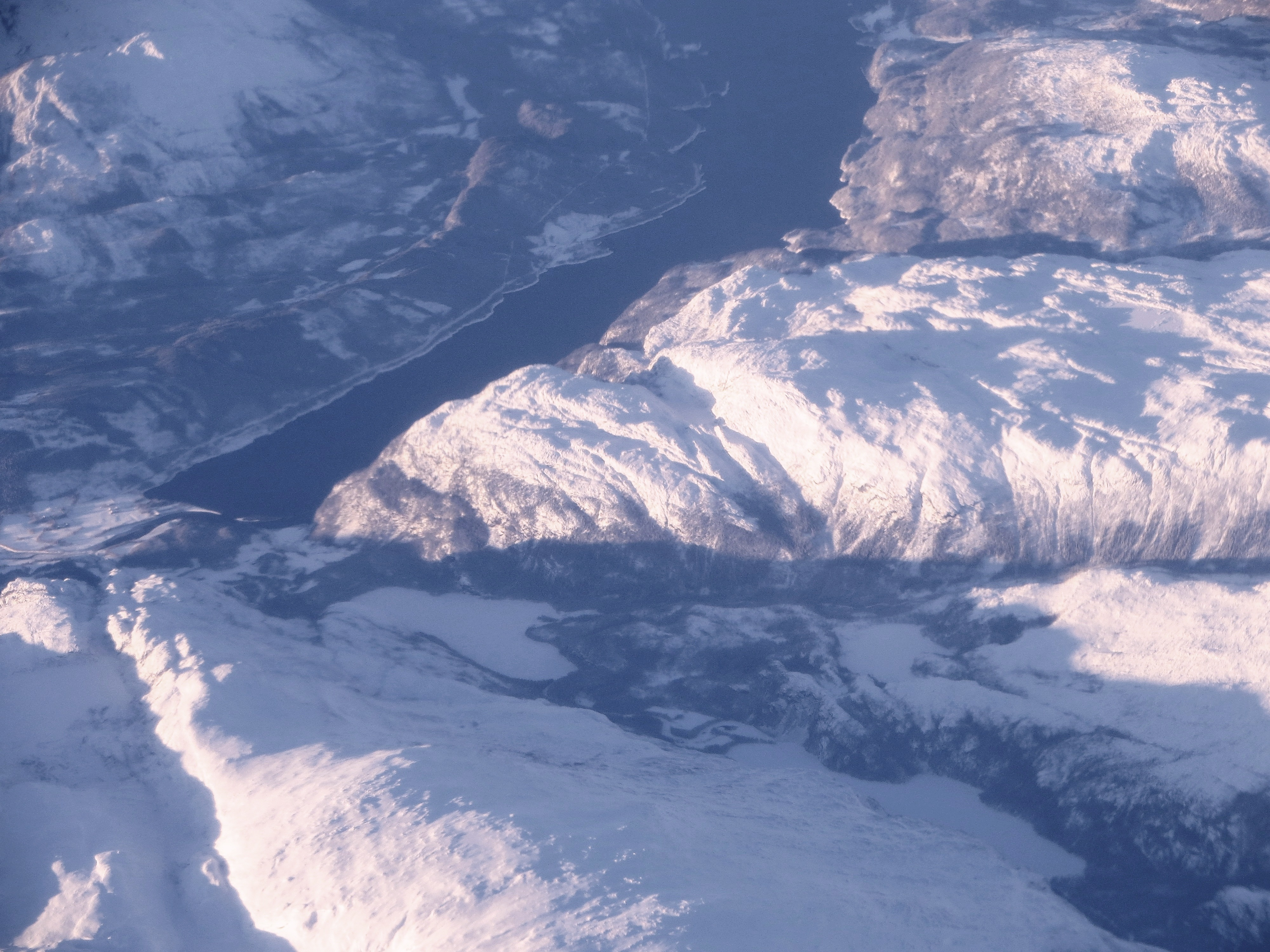
View of Kongsmoen at the inner end of the Foldafjord
