= Lorents Mørkved =

Norwegian politician (1844-1924)

Lorents Mørkved (16 March 1844 – 7 February 1924) was a Norwegian farmer and politician for the Liberal Party.

== Personal life ==
He was born at Mørkved in Høilandet Municipality in Nord-Trøndelag county, Norway. He was a son of farmers Anders Lorentsen Mørkved and Johanne Olsdatter.

Together with Sofie Aavatsmark (1850–1935), a sister of Ivar Aavatsmark, he had the son Salamon Mørkved. Their daughter Marie married politician Albert Fredrik Eggen, and their daughter in turn married Otto Øgrim. Through another of Lorents' sons, Knut, he was the grandfather of diplomat Knut Mørkved.

== Career ==
Mørkved spent his entire career at the family farm. He was a member of the municipal council for Høilandet Municipality for thirty years, serving twelve years as deputy mayor and sixteen years as mayor. In 1906 he stood for parliamentary election in the constituency Snaasen, challenged by no less than three other candidates from his own party; incumbent Hans Konrad Foosnæs, his brother-in-law Ivar Aavatsmark and Ole Olsen Five. Mørkved ended fourth in the first round with only 134 votes, and fifth in the second round with only one vote. He later became Aavatsmark's running mate and served as a deputy representative to the Parliament of Norway during the terms 1910–1912, 1913–1915 and 1916–1918. In 1910 he filled in for Aavatsmark and met in session as a member of the Standing Committee on the Military.
