= Grungstadvatnet =

Lake in Trøndelag, Norway

- Interactive map of the lake
- Location: Høylandet Municipality, Trøndelag
- Coordinates: 64.5919°N 12.2102°E
- Primary inflows: Søråa river
- Primary outflows: Eida river
- Basin countries: Norway
- Max. length: 5 kilometres (3.1 mi)
- Max. width: 2 kilometres (1.2 mi)
- Surface area: 6.71 km^{2} (2.59 sq mi)
- Average depth: 48 metres (157 ft)
- Shore length^{1}: 15.81 kilometres (9.82 mi)
- Surface elevation: 14 metres (46 ft)
- References: NVE
- ^{1} Shore length is not a well-defined measure.

Grungstadvatnet is a lake in Høylandet Municipality in Trøndelag county, Norway. There are salmon, sea trout, european eel, trout, and Arctic char in the lake. The 6.71-square-kilometre (2.59 sq mi) lake lies just to the north of the large lake Eidsvatnet.

== See also ==
- List of lakes in Norway
