= Høylandet Church =

Church in Trøndelag, Norway

- Høylandet kirke
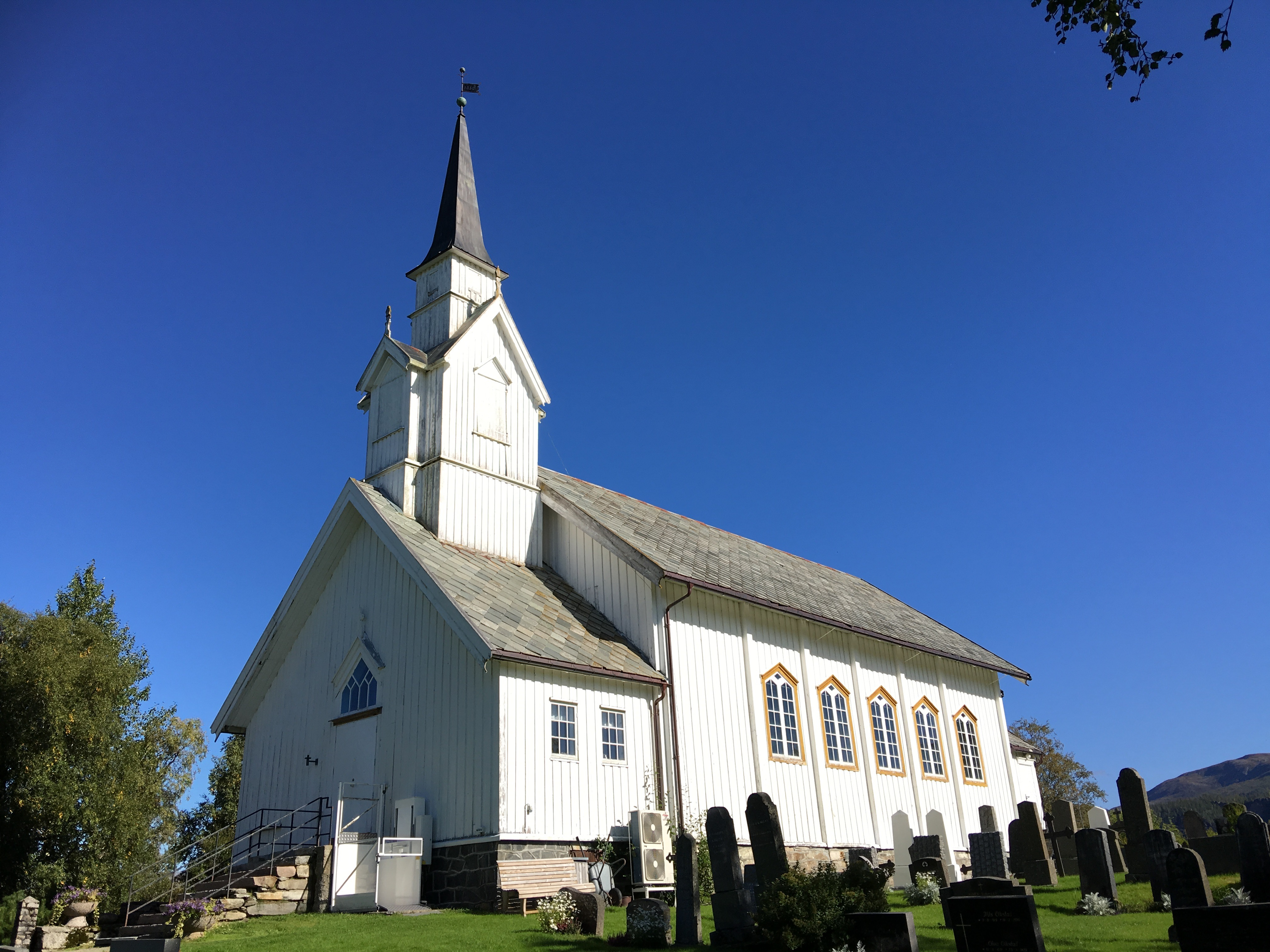
- View of the church
- Høylandet Church
- 64.64235909°N 12.31361818°E
- Location: Høylandet Municipality, Trøndelag
- Country: Norway
- Denomination: Church of Norway
- Churchmanship: Evangelical Lutheran

History
- Former name: Romstad kirke
- Status: Parish church
- Founded: 12th century
- Consecrated: 5 Sept 1860

Architecture
- Functional status: Active
- Architect: Christian Heinrich Grosch
- Architectural type: Long church
- Completed: 1860 (166 years ago)

Specifications
- Capacity: 250
- Materials: Wood

Administration
- Diocese: Nidaros bispedømme
- Deanery: Namdal prosti
- Parish: Høylandet
- Norwegian Cultural Heritage Site
- Type: Church
- Status: Not protected
- ID: 84705

Høylandet Church (Norwegian: Høylandet kirke) is a parish church of the Church of Norway in Høylandet Municipality in Trøndelag county, Norway. It is located in the village of Høylandet. It is the main church for the Høylandet parish which is part of the Namdal prosti (deanery) in the Diocese of Nidaros. The white, wooden church was built by Knut Grut in a long church style in 1860 using plans drawn up by the architect Christian Heinrich Grosch. The church seats about 250 people.

== History ==
The earliest existing historical records of the church date back to the year 1543, but the church has a woven tapestry in its inventory that dates back to the late 12th century, so that the church may have been founded around that time. The first church here was a stave church that was located about 100 metres (330 ft) northwest of the present church site. The old church was known as Romstad Church and it was an annex church under the main Ranem Church. In 1597, the church was described in existing records that it was a very old church that was not used much any more and that locals used the building to dry meat inside. In 1672, the old stave church was torn down and a new building was constructed on the same site. By 1681, the new church had already seen some major damage due to settlement and a poor foundation, so major repairs were undertaken. In 1860, a new church was built about 100 metres (330 ft) southeast of the old church. The new building was consecrated on 5 September 1860. After the new church was completed, the old church was torn down and its materials were sold to a builder in Namsos who used it to build an apartment building there. That apartment building burned down in 1897 during a city-wide fire.

== See also ==
- List of churches in Nidaros
