= Hans Konrad Foosnæs =

Norwegian politician

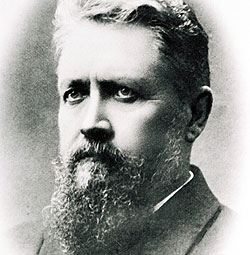

Minister of Agriculture
- In office 19 March 1908 – 2 February 1910
- Prime Minister: Gunnar Knudsen
- Preceded by: Sven Aarrestad
- Succeeded by: Wollert Konow

Member of the Norwegian Parliament
- In office 1 January 1904 – 31 December 1906
- Constituency: Nordre Trondhjem
- In office 1 January 1889 – 31 December 1900
- Constituency: Nordre Trondhjem
- In office 1 January 1883 – 31 December 1885
- Constituency: Nordre Trondhjem

Mayor of Beitstad Municipality
- In office 1 January 1914 – 31 December 1916
- Preceded by: Odin Kvam
- Succeeded by: Odin Kvam
- In office 1 January 1880 – 31 December 1910
- Preceded by: Christoffer Hjelde
- Succeeded by: Odin Kvam

Personal details
- Born: Hans Konrad Henriksen Foosnæs; 2 February 1846 Namdalseid Municipality, Nordre Trondhjem, United Kingdoms of Sweden and Norway
- Died: 30 July 1917 (aged 71) Beitstad Municipality, Nordre Trondhjem, Norway
- Party: Liberal
- Spouse(s): Anne Kjerstine Guldahl (m. 1885); Marie Severine Bragstad (1877–1880)
- Relatives: Hans Andersen Barlien (grandfather)
- Occupation: Politician

Hans Konrad Henriksen Foosnæs (2 February 1846 – 30 July 1917) was a Norwegian politician for the Liberal Party. He served as Minister of Agriculture from 1908 to 1910.

== Personal life ==
He was born in Namdalseid Municipality. He was the grandson of politician, Hans Andersen Barlien.

== Career ==
He was elected as a member of the municipal council of Beitstaden Municipality in 1878, and served as mayor there from 1880 to 1907. He was elected to the Parliament of Norway from Nordre Trondhjems Amt in 1882, and then won five non-consecutive re-elections in 1888, 1891, 1894, 1897 and 1903.

In 1906 he stood for re-election for a seventh time, now in the constituency Snaasen as the constituencies had been restructured. He was challenged by no less than three other candidates from his own party; Ivar Aavatsmark, Ole Olsen Five and Lorents Mørkved. In the first round of voting Aavatsmark took the lead with 1,210 votes against Foosnæs' 1,145 votes. In the second round of voting, Foosnæs with N. E. Brenne gathered 1,476 votes, and he lost his seat to Aavatsmark who won it with 2,157 votes.

From 1908 to 1910 he served in Knudsen's First Cabinet as the Minister of Agriculture. Foosnæs tried to re-contest the seat in 1912, and gathered 1,513 votes. However, Aavatsmark with Mørkved as running mate won 2,642 votes and hence the seat. In 1915 Foosnæs finished a distant third, now also beaten by the Labour candidate.
