= Eidsvoll Warranty =

1814 legislative act in Norway

The Eidsvoll Warranty (Norwegian: Eidsvollsgarantien) was an act passed by the Norwegian Constituent Assembly at Eidsvold on 13 May 1814. The prime purpose of the act was to create a stable Norwegian currency.

== Summary ==
An elected Finance Committee at the Constituent Assembly presented its proposal followed by a vigorous debate. The final vote ended with passage of the resolution with 76 votes for the proposal and 29 votes against passage. The resolution provided for the elimination of the current state budget deficit as well as the projected budget until 1 March 1815 of 14 billion Norwegian riksdaler. The resolution contained a guarantee that the Norwegian government would repay government debt incurred during the Denmark–Norway union. In 1813, following the Danish financial crisis in the aftermath of the Napoleonic Wars, a new currency system had been introduced based on the rigsbankdaler. The resolution contained a guaranteed exchange rate for the riksbankdaler at a fixed level. Although the Eidsvoll Warranty was intended to stabilize the value of the Norwegian currency, the rate continued to fall over in next few years leading up to the establishment of the Norges Bank on 14 June 1816.

== See also ==
- Norway in 1814
- Norwegian speciedaler

== Other sources ==
- Fra Peder Anker Til Stabilitet I Pengevesenet (Øyvind Eitrheim, Norges Bank. June 7, 2005)
- Brief history of Norges Bank (Norges Bank. January 31, 2007)
