= Høylandet Municipality =

Municipality in Trøndelag, Norway

Høylandet Municipality Høylandet kommune Hillaante
- Municipality
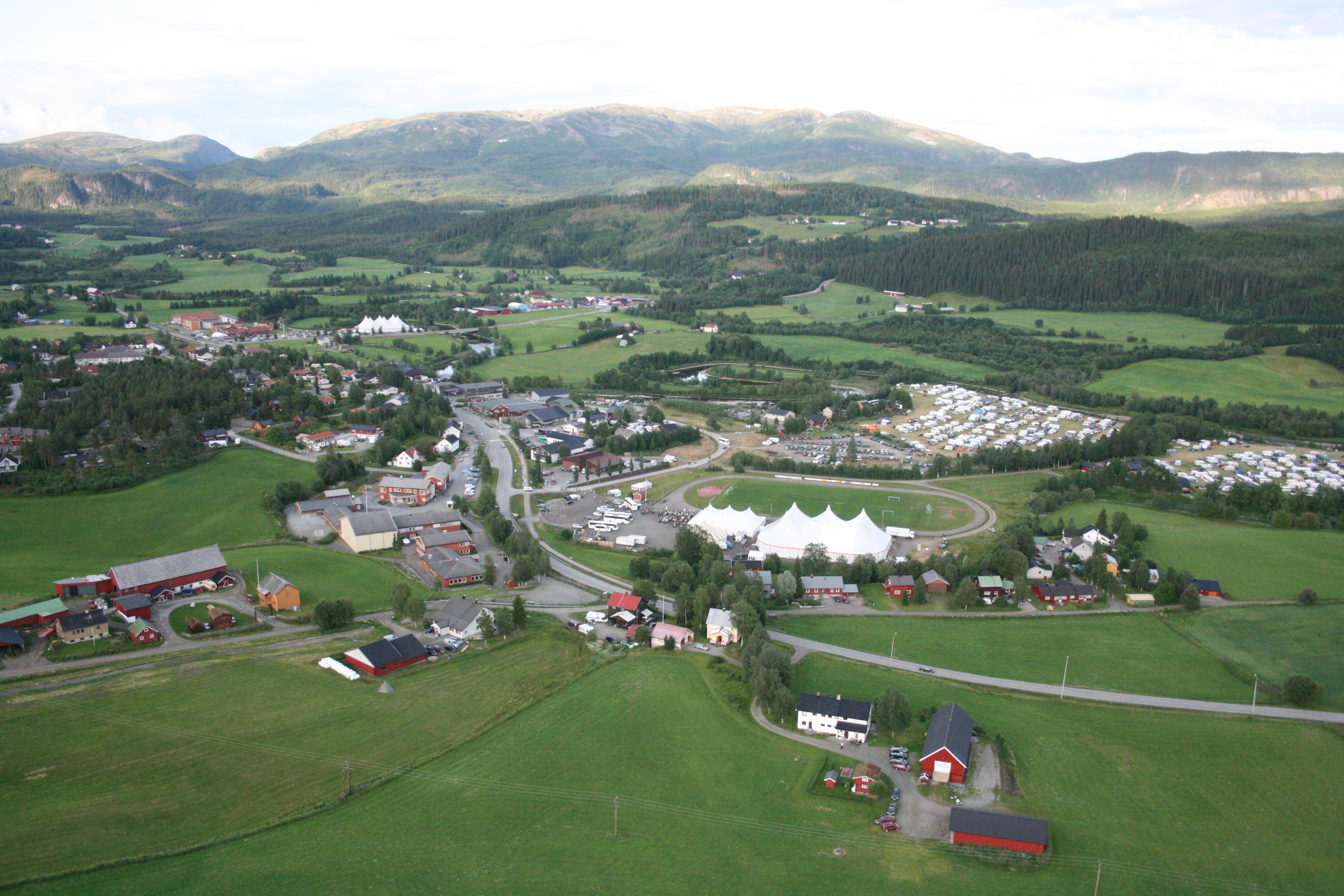
- View of Høylandet village

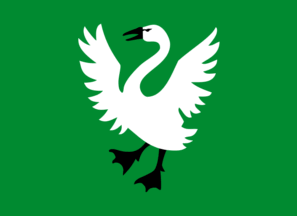
- Flag Coat of arms

- Trøndelag within Norway

- Høylandet within Trøndelag
- Coordinates: 64°43′27″N 12°20′02″E
- Country: Norway
- County: Trøndelag
- District: Namdalen
- Established: 1 Jan 1901
  - Preceded by: Grong Municipality
- Administrative centre: Høylandet

Government
  - Mayor (2023): Ole Joar Flaat (Sp)

Area
  - Total: 754.68 km^{2} (291.38 sq mi)
  - Land: 702.65 km^{2} (271.29 sq mi)
  - Water: 52.03 km^{2} (20.09 sq mi) 6.9%
  - Rank: #150 in Norway
- Highest elevation: 926.17 m (3,038.6 ft)

Population (2024)
  - Total: 1,222
  - Rank: #319 in Norway
  - Density: 1.6/km^{2} (4.1/sq mi)
  - Change (10 years): ▼ −2.8%
- Demonym: Høylending

Official language
  - Norwegian form: Neutral
- Time zone: UTC+01:00 (CET)
  - Summer (DST): UTC+02:00 (CEST)
- ISO 3166 code: NO-5046
- Website: Official website

Høylandet is a municipality in Trøndelag county, Norway. It is part of the Namdalen region. The administrative centre of the municipality is the village of Høylandet. Other villages include Kongsmoen and Vassbotna.

The 755-square-kilometre (292 sq mi) municipality is the 150th largest by area out of the 357 municipalities in Norway. Høylandet Municipality is the 319th most populous municipality in Norway with a population of 1,222. The municipality's population density is 1.6 inhabitants per square kilometre (4.1/sq mi) and its population has decreased by 2.8% over the previous 10-year period.

== General information ==
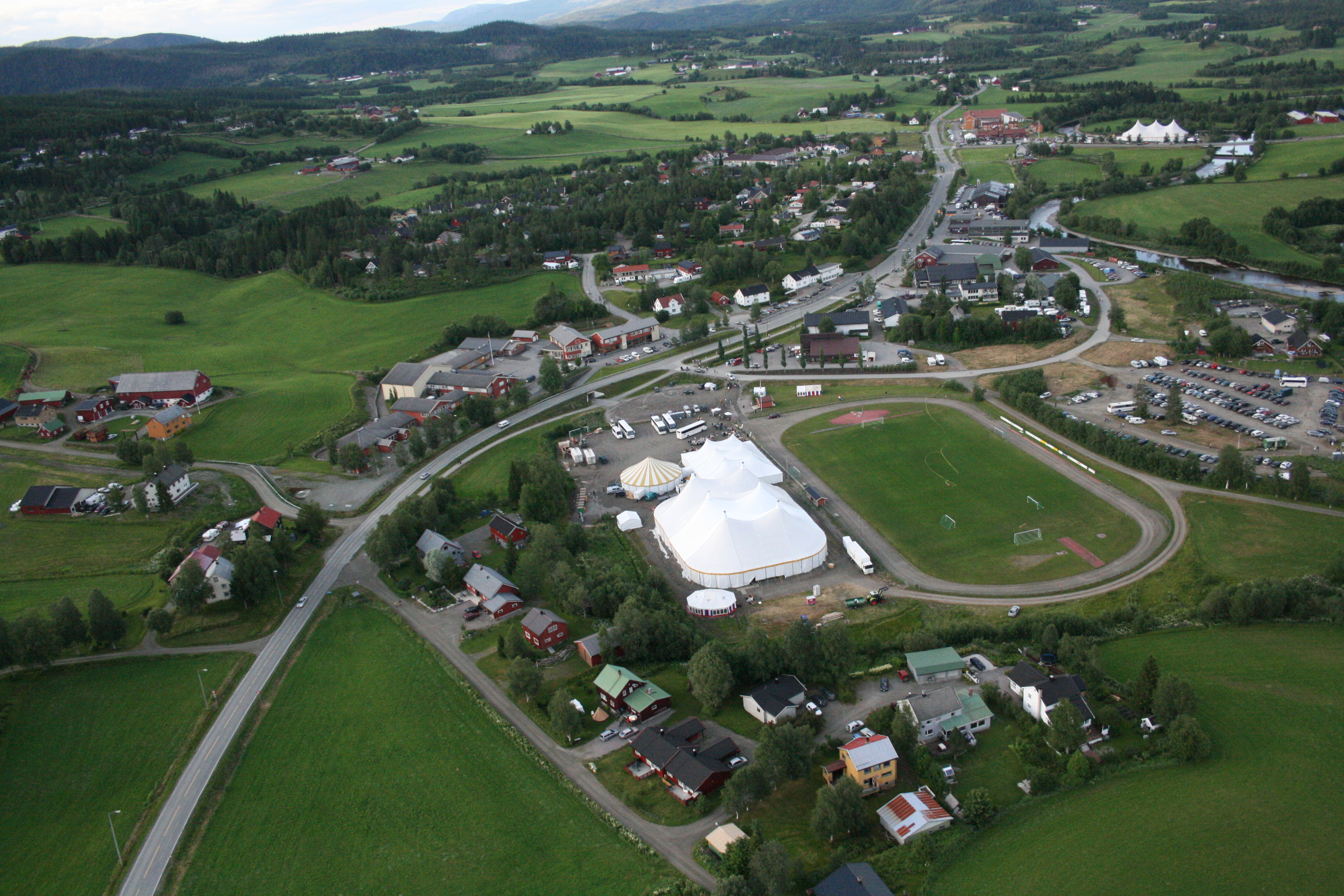
View of Høylandet

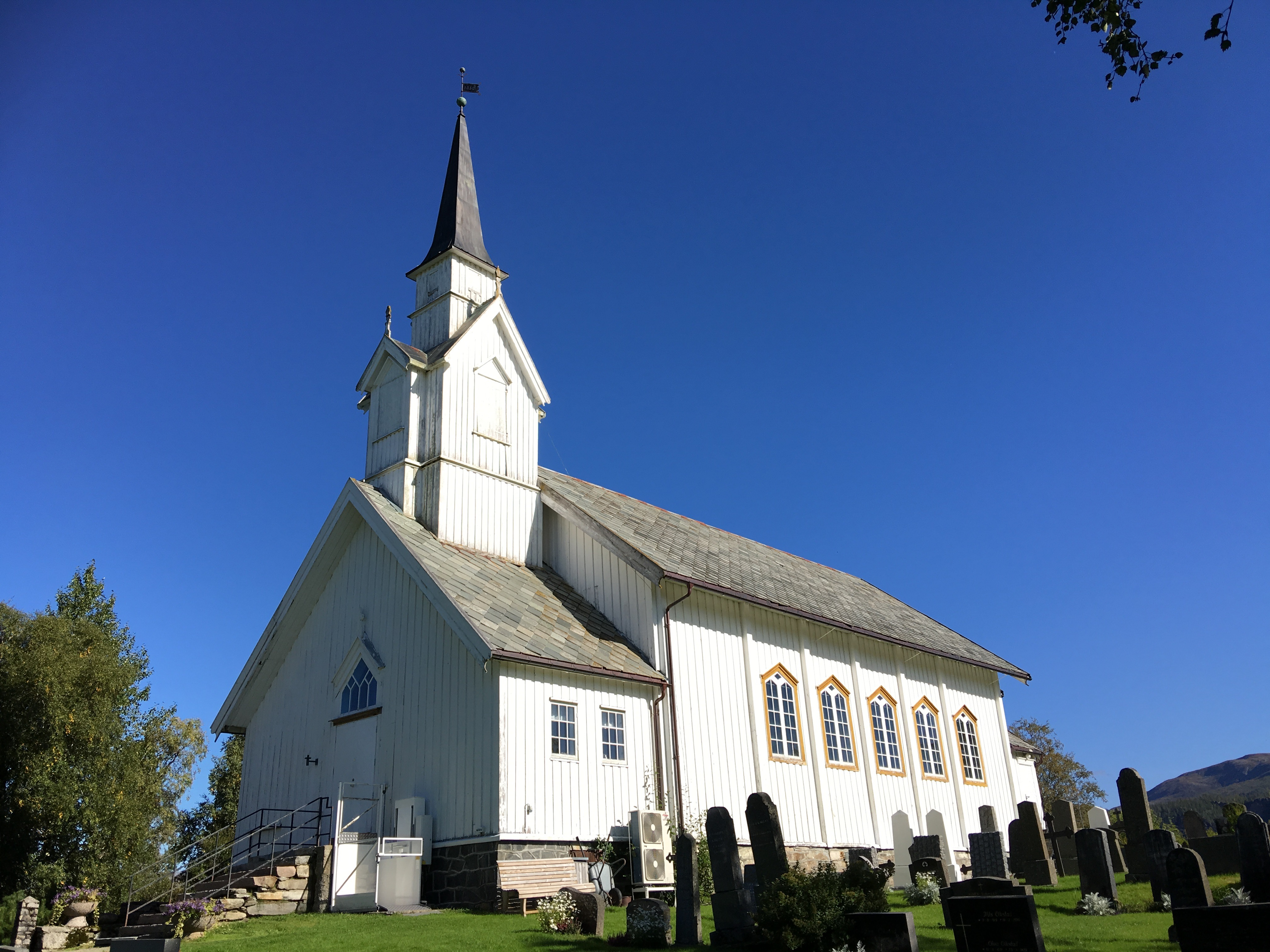
Høylandet Church

The municipality of Høylandet was established on 1 January 1901 when it was separated from the large Grong Municipality. Initially, the population of Høylandet Municipality was 1,046. During the 1960s, there were many municipal mergers across Norway due to the work of the Schei Committee. On 1 January 1964, the Kongsmoen area (population: 221) of eastern Foldereid Municipality was merged into Høylandet Municipality. On that same date the Galguften and Hauknes areas (population: 15) were transferred from Høylandet Municipality to neighboring Overhalla Municipality. On 1 January 2018, the municipality switched from the old Nord-Trøndelag county to the new Trøndelag county.

=== Name ===
The municipality (originally the parish) is named Høylandet (Old Norse: Høylǫnd). The first element is høy which means "hay". The last element is the plural form of lǫnd which means "land" or "region". Thus it means "the land/region where they grow hay". The name was historically spelled Hølandet or Høilandet.

=== Coat of arms ===
The coat of arms was granted on 2 January 1990. The official blazon is "Vert, a swan argent rousant, armed sable" (Norwegian: I grønt en oppflygende sølv svane). This means the arms have a green field (background) and the charge is a whooper swan (Cygnus cygnus). The swan has a tincture of argent which means it is commonly colored white, but if it is made out of metal, then silver is used. The swan is also armed, which means the feet and beak are black. This design was chosen to symbolize of the large number of these swans that migrate through the area each year. The arms were designed by Einar H. Skjervold.

=== Churches ===
The Church of Norway has one parish (sokn) within Høylandet Municipality. It is part of the Namdal prosti (deanery) in the Diocese of Nidaros.

Churches in Høylandet Municipality
Parish (sokn)	Church name	Location of the church	Year built
Høylandet	Drageid Church	Vassbotna	1976
Høylandet	Høylandet Church	Høylandet	1860
Høylandet	Kongsmo Chapel	Kongsmoen	1937

== Geography ==
There are several large lakes in Høylandet including Almåsgrønningen, Eidsvatnet, Grungstadvatnet, Øyvatnet, and Storgrønningen. The innermost part of the Foldafjord is located in northern Høylandet. Norwegian County Road 17 runs through the municipality from south to north through the central valley. The highest point in the municipality is the 926.17-metre (3,038.6 ft) tall mountain Nonsfjellet (Southern Sami: Joevejællatjahke).

== Government ==
Høylandet Municipality is responsible for primary education (through 10th grade), outpatient health services, senior citizen services, welfare and other social services, zoning, economic development, and municipal roads and utilities. The municipality is governed by a municipal council of directly elected representatives. The mayor is indirectly elected by a vote of the municipal council. The municipality is under the jurisdiction of the Trøndelag District Court and the Frostating Court of Appeal.

Municipal waste management has since 1979 been handled by the inter-municipal Midtre Namdal Avfallsselskap, with ReTrans Midt handling waste collection since 2018.

=== Municipal council ===
The municipal council (Kommunestyre) of Høylandet Municipality is made up of 15 representatives that are elected to four year terms. The tables below show the current and historical composition of the council by political party.

Høylandet kommunestyre 2023–2027
Party name (in Norwegian)	Number of representatives
Labour Party (Arbeiderpartiet)	6
Centre Party (Senterpartiet)	8
Liberal Party (Venstre)	1
Total number of members:	15

Høylandet kommunestyre 2019–2023
Party name (in Norwegian)	Number of representatives
Labour Party (Arbeiderpartiet)	6
Centre Party (Senterpartiet)	9
Total number of members:	15

Høylandet kommunestyre 2015–2019
Party name (in Norwegian)	Number of representatives
Labour Party (Arbeiderpartiet)	5
Centre Party (Senterpartiet)	12
Liberal Party (Venstre)	1
Local List(s) (Lokale lister)	1
Total number of members:	19

Høylandet kommunestyre 2011–2015
Party name (in Norwegian)	Number of representatives
Labour Party (Arbeiderpartiet)	6
Centre Party (Senterpartiet)	10
Liberal Party (Venstre)	1
Local List(s) (Lokale lister)	1
Electoral list for Upper Høylandet and Kongsmoen (Valgliste for Øvre-Høylandet og Kongsmoen)	1
Total number of members:	19

Høylandet kommunestyre 2007–2011
Party name (in Norwegian)	Number of representatives
Labour Party (Arbeiderpartiet)	4
Centre Party (Senterpartiet)	10
Socialist Left Party (Sosialistisk Venstreparti)	1
Liberal Party (Venstre)	1
Electoral list for Upper Høylandet and Kongsmoen (Valgliste for Øvre Høylandet og Kongsmoen)	2
Local list for Høylandet (Bygdeliste for Høylandet)	1
Total number of members:	19

Høylandet kommunestyre 2003–2007
Party name (in Norwegian)	Number of representatives
Labour Party (Arbeiderpartiet)	7
Centre Party (Senterpartiet)	8
Liberal Party (Venstre)	1
Electoral list for Upper Høylandet and Kongsmoen (Valgliste for Øvre Høylandet og Kongsmoen)	2
Local list for Høylandet (Bygdeliste for Høylandet)	1
Total number of members:	19

Høylandet kommunestyre 1999–2003
Party name (in Norwegian)	Number of representatives
Labour Party (Arbeiderpartiet)	6
Centre Party (Senterpartiet)	6
Socialist Left Party (Sosialistisk Venstreparti)	1
Liberal Party (Venstre)	2
Local list for Upper Høylandet and Kongsmoen (Kretsliste for Øvre Høylandet og Kongsmoen)	2
Local list for Høylandet (Bygdeliste for Høylandet)	2
Total number of members:	19

Høylandet kommunestyre 1995–1999
Party name (in Norwegian)	Number of representatives
Labour Party (Arbeiderpartiet)	6
Centre Party (Senterpartiet)	6
Socialist Left Party (Sosialistisk Venstreparti)	1
Liberal Party (Venstre)	1
Local list for Upper Høylandet and Kongsmoen (Kretsliste for Øvre Høylandet og Kongsmoen)	3
Local list for Høylandet (Bygdeliste for Høylandet)	2
Total number of members:	19

Høylandet kommunestyre 1991–1995
Party name (in Norwegian)	Number of representatives
Labour Party (Arbeiderpartiet)	7
Centre Party (Senterpartiet)	5
Liberal Party (Venstre)	2
Election list for Upper Høylandet and the Kongsmo area (Valgliste for Øvre Høylandet og Kongsmo krets)	2
Local list for Høylandet (Bygdeliste for Høylandet)	3
Total number of members:	19

Høylandet kommunestyre 1987–1991
Party name (in Norwegian)	Number of representatives
Labour Party (Arbeiderpartiet)	6
Centre Party (Senterpartiet)	3
Liberal Party (Venstre)	3
Local list for Upper Høylandet and the Kongsmo area (Bygdeliste for Øvre Høylandet og Kongsmo krets)	2
Local list for Høylandet (Bygdeliste for Høylandet)	5
Total number of members:	19

Høylandet kommunestyre 1983–1987
Party name (in Norwegian)	Number of representatives
Labour Party (Arbeiderpartiet)	9
Centre Party (Senterpartiet)	5
Liberal Party (Venstre)	2
Election list for Upper Høylandet and the Kongsmo area (Valgliste for Øvre Høylandet og Kongsmo krets)	3
Total number of members:	19

Høylandet kommunestyre 1979–1983
Party name (in Norwegian)	Number of representatives
Labour Party (Arbeiderpartiet)	7
Conservative Party (Høyre)	1
Centre Party (Senterpartiet)	4
Liberal Party (Venstre)	3
Election list for Upper Høylandet and the Kongsmo area (Valgliste for Øvre Høylandet og Kongsmo krets)	4
Total number of members:	19

Høylandet kommunestyre 1975–1979
Party name (in Norwegian)	Number of representatives
Labour Party (Arbeiderpartiet)	8
Centre Party (Senterpartiet)	4
Liberal Party (Venstre)	3
Election list for Upper Høylandet and the Kongsmo area (Valgliste for Øvre Høylandet og Kongsmo krets)	4
Total number of members:	19

Høylandet kommunestyre 1971–1975
Party name (in Norwegian)	Number of representatives
Labour Party (Arbeiderpartiet)	8
Centre Party (Senterpartiet)	4
Liberal Party (Venstre)	4
Local List(s) (Lokale lister)	3
Total number of members:	19

Høylandet kommunestyre 1967–1971
Party name (in Norwegian)	Number of representatives
Labour Party (Arbeiderpartiet)	7
Centre Party (Senterpartiet)	3
Liberal Party (Venstre)	5
Local List(s) (Lokale lister)	4
Total number of members:	19

Høylandet kommunestyre 1963–1967
Party name (in Norwegian)	Number of representatives
Labour Party (Arbeiderpartiet)	8
Christian Democratic Party (Kristelig Folkeparti)	1
Centre Party (Senterpartiet)	4
Liberal Party (Venstre)	4
Local List(s) (Lokale lister)	2
Total number of members:	19

Høylandet herredsstyre 1959–1963
Party name (in Norwegian)	Number of representatives
Labour Party (Arbeiderpartiet)	7
Centre Party (Senterpartiet)	4
Liberal Party (Venstre)	4
Local List(s) (Lokale lister)	2
Total number of members:	17

Høylandet herredsstyre 1955–1959
Party name (in Norwegian)	Number of representatives
Labour Party (Arbeiderpartiet)	7
Farmers' Party (Bondepartiet)	4
Liberal Party (Venstre)	4
Joint List(s) of Non-Socialist Parties (Borgerlige Felleslister)	2
Total number of members:	17

Høylandet herredsstyre 1951–1955
Party name (in Norwegian)	Number of representatives
Labour Party (Arbeiderpartiet)	6
Farmers' Party (Bondepartiet)	4
Liberal Party (Venstre)	4
Local List(s) (Lokale lister)	2
Total number of members:	16

Høylandet herredsstyre 1947–1951
Party name (in Norwegian)	Number of representatives
Labour Party (Arbeiderpartiet)	6
Liberal Party (Venstre)	5
Joint List(s) of Non-Socialist Parties (Borgerlige Felleslister)	3
Local List(s) (Lokale lister)	2
Total number of members:	16

Høylandet herredsstyre 1945–1947
Party name (in Norwegian)	Number of representatives
Labour Party (Arbeiderpartiet)	6
Farmers' Party (Bondepartiet)	2
Liberal Party (Venstre)	4
Local List(s) (Lokale lister)	4
Total number of members:	16

Høylandet herredsstyre 1937–1941*
Party name (in Norwegian)	Number of representatives
Labour Party (Arbeiderpartiet)	6
Joint List(s) of Non-Socialist Parties (Borgerlige Felleslister)	7
Local List(s) (Lokale lister)	3
Total number of members:	16
Note: Due to the German occupation of Norway during World War II, no elections were held for new municipal councils until after the war ended in 1945.

=== Mayors ===
The mayor (Norwegian: ordfører) of Høylandet is the political leader of the municipality and the chairperson of the municipal council. Here is a list of people who have held this position:

- 1901–1916: Lorents Mørkved (V)
- 1917–1922: Alexander Almaas (V)
- 1923–1925: Ole P. Skarland
- 1926–1932: Anders L. Mørkved (V)
- 1933–1934: Knut Mørkved (Bp)
- 1935–1940: Martin Mørkved (V)
- 1941–1945: Knut Mørkved (NS)
- 1945–1963: Martin Mørkved (V)
- 1964–1983: Gunnleif Elden (Sp)
- 1984–1991: Ole Flakken (Sp)
- 1992–1993: Lars Otto Okstad (Sp)
- 1994–1995: Hildbjørn Brøndbo (Ap)
- 1995–2011: Lars Otto Okstad (Sp)
- 2011–2023: Hege Nordheim-Viken (Sp)
- 2023–present: Ole Joar Flaat (Sp)

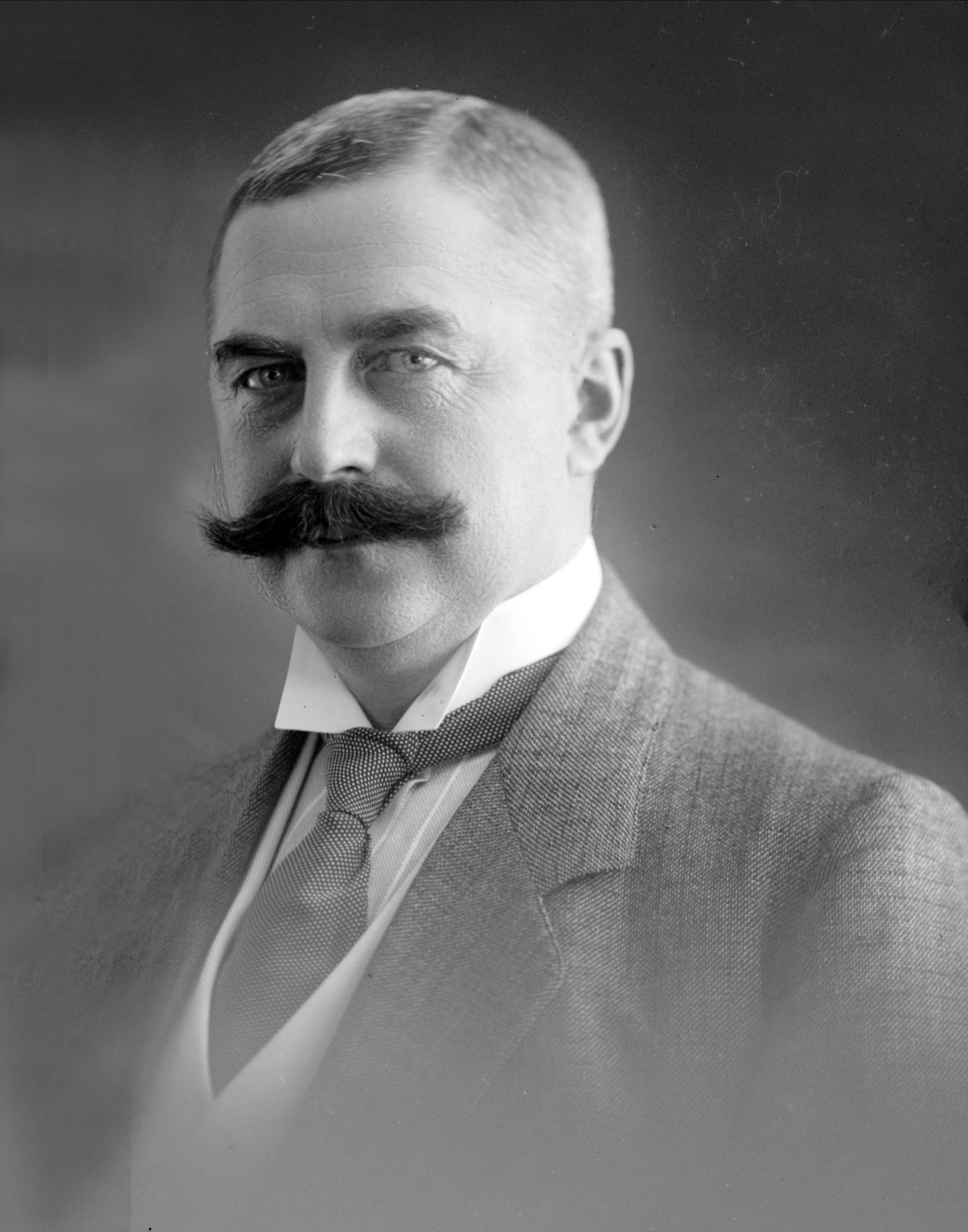
Ivar Aavatsmark

== Notable people ==
- Lorents Mørkved (1844 in Markved – 1924), a farmer and politician who was Mayor of Høylandet for 16 years
- Ivar Aavatsmark (1864 in Høylandet – 1947), an officer, politician & Govt. minister
- Salamon Mørkved (1891 in Høylandet – 1978), a forester and politician
- Ivar Skarland (1899 in Høylandet – 1965), an anthropologist
- Pål Tyldum (born 1942), a cross country skier
