= Knut Mørkved =

Norwegian diplomat (1938-2017)

Knut Mørkved (29 March 1938 – 10 November 2017) was a Norwegian diplomat.

He hailed from Steinkjer as a son of county forest manager Karl Mørkved and grandson of Lorents Mørkved. He took the mag.art. degree in political science and started working for the Norwegian Ministry of Foreign Affairs in 1967. His early diplomatic stations were in Brussels, Cairo and at the UN in New York City. From 1976 to 1980 he served as the secretary of the Standing Committee on Foreign Affairs. He served as Norway's ambassador to the Philippines from 1983 to 1987 and Egypt from 1988 to 1992, and after a stint as a special adviser in the Ministry of Foreign Affairs from 1992 to 1996 he served as ambassador to Croatia from 1997 to 2001 before retiring. During his time in Cairo he also had side accreditations to Jordan, Syria and Sudan, and while in Croatia he also covered Bosnia and Hercegovina.

He resided in Bærum Municipality and died in November 2017.
