= Høylandet (village) =

Village in Høylandet Municipality, Norway

- Village
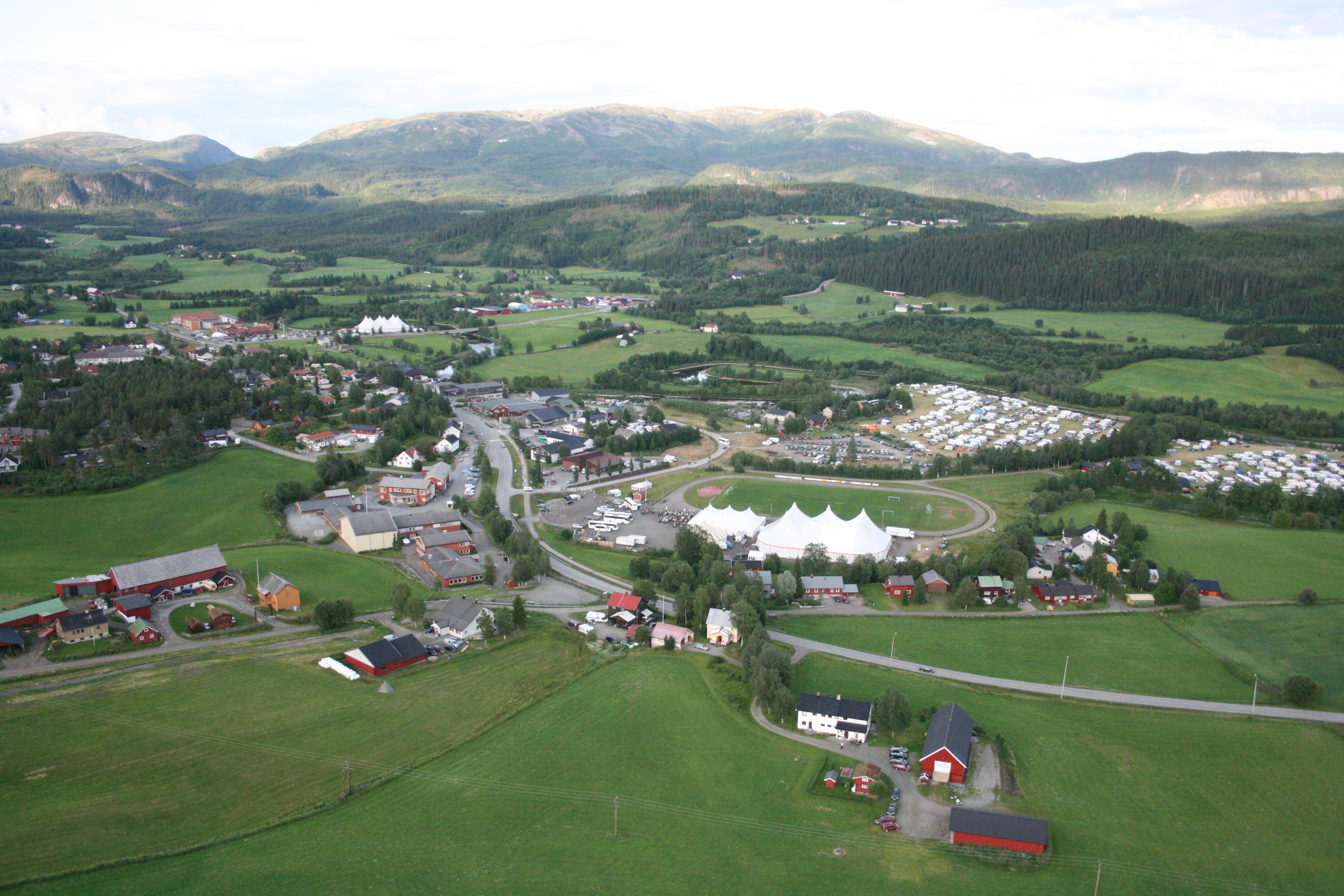
- Aerial view of the village
- Interactive map of Høylandet
- Location within Trøndelag Location within Norway
- Coordinates: 64.6285°N 12.3028°E
- Country: Norway
- Region: Central Norway
- County: Trøndelag
- District: Namdalen
- Municipality: Høylandet Municipality

Area
  - Total: 0.45 km^{2} (0.17 sq mi)
- Elevation: 23 m (75 ft)

Population (2024)
  - Total: 370
  - Density: 822/km^{2} (2,130/sq mi)
- Time zone: UTC+01:00 (CET)
  - Summer (DST): UTC+02:00 (CEST)
- Post Code: 7977 Høylandet

Høylandet is the administrative centre of Høylandet Municipality in Trøndelag county, Norway. The village is located lies along the river Søråa in the southern part of the municipality, about 10 kilometres (6.2 mi) northeast of the village of Vassbotna and about 12 kilometres (7.5 mi) northwest of the village of Gartland (and access to the European route E6 highway and the Nordlandsbanen railway). The Norwegian County Road 17 runs through Høylandet. Høylandet Church is located on the north side of the village.

The 0.45-square-kilometre (110-acre) village has a population (2024) of 370 and a population density of 822 inhabitants per square kilometre (2,130/sq mi).

== Name ==
The name of the village (and municipality) comes from the Old Norse form of the name: Høylandir. The first element is høy which means "hay" and the last element is the plural form of land which means "land" or "region". The name was historically spelled Hølandet.
