= Åfjord =

Åfjord may refer to:

== Places ==
- Åfjord Municipality, a municipality in Trøndelag county, Norway
- Å, Åfjord (also known as Åfjord), a village within Åfjord Municipality in Trøndelag county, Norway
- Åfjorden, a fjord in Åfjord Municipality in Trøndelag county, Norway
- Åfjord Church, a church in Åfjord Municipality in Trøndelag county, Norway

== Other ==
- Åfjord IL, a sports club based in Åfjord Municipality in Trøndelag county, Norway
