= Stoksund =

Stoksund or Stokksund may refer to:

== Places ==
- Revsnes, Trøndelag (also known as Stoksund), a village in Åfjord Municipality in Trøndelag county, Norway
- Stoksund Municipality, a former municipality in the old Sør-Trøndelag county, Norway
- Stoksund Church, a church in Åfjord Municipality in Trøndelag county, Norway

== See also ==
- Stocksund
- Stokksundet
