= Åfjord Church =

Church in Trøndelag, Norway

- Åfjord kirke
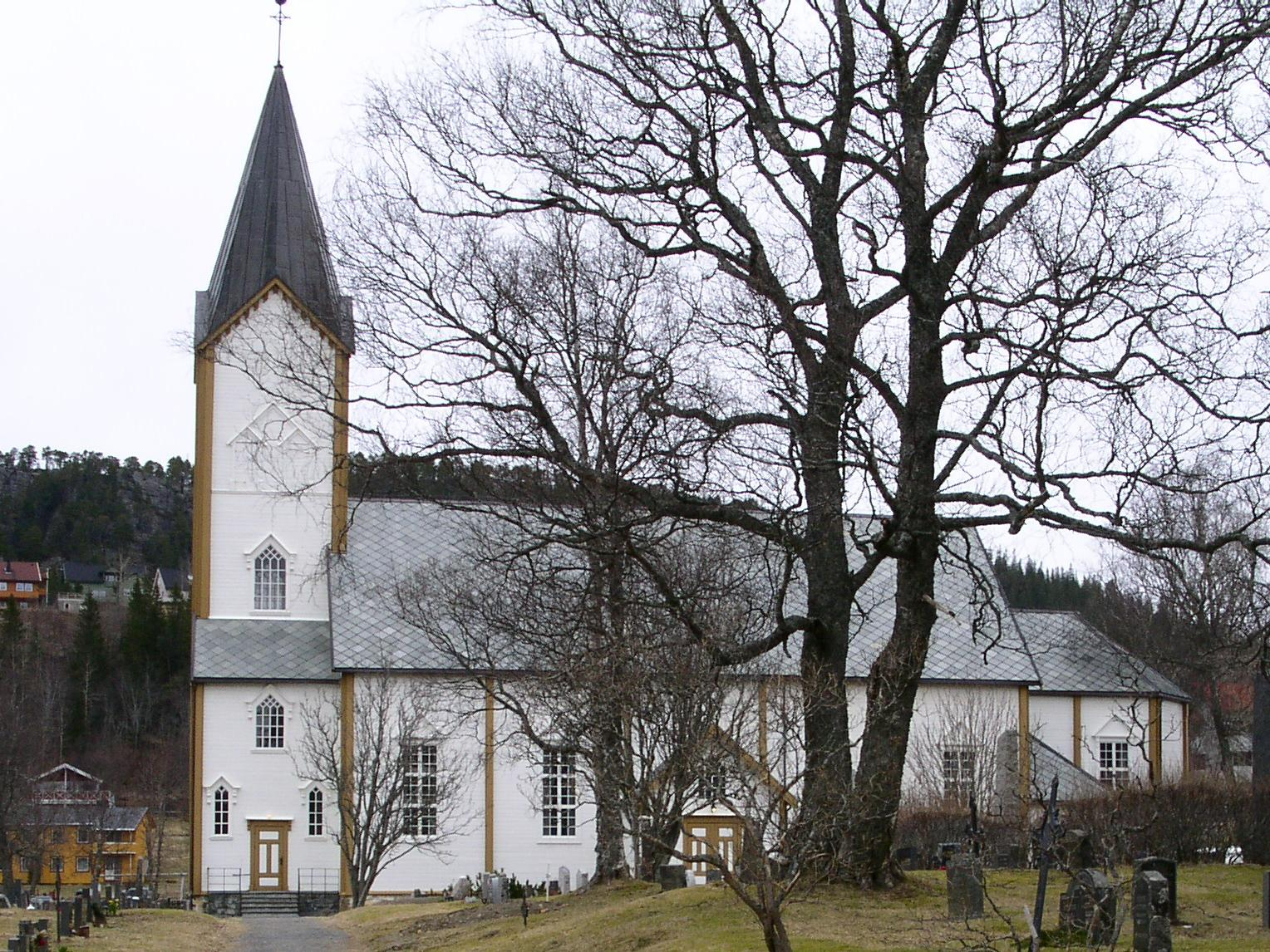
- View of the church
- Åfjord Church
- 63.96696565°N 10.22024095°E
- Location: Åfjord Municipality, Trøndelag
- Country: Norway
- Denomination: Church of Norway
- Churchmanship: Evangelical Lutheran

History
- Former name: Aa kirke
- Status: Parish church
- Founded: 13th century
- Consecrated: 9 Oct 1879

Architecture
- Functional status: Active
- Architect: Knut Guttormsen
- Architectural type: Long church
- Completed: 1879 (147 years ago)

Specifications
- Capacity: 430
- Materials: Wood

Administration
- Diocese: Nidaros bispedømme
- Deanery: Fosen prosti
- Parish: Åfjord og Stoksund
- Norwegian Cultural Heritage Site
- Type: Church
- Status: Listed
- ID: 85950

Åfjord Church (Norwegian: Åfjord kirke) is a parish church of the Church of Norway in Åfjord Municipality in Trøndelag county, Norway. It is located in the village of Årnes, just east of the Åfjorden and west of the lake Stordalsvatnet. It is one of two churches in the Åfjord og Stoksund parish which is part of the Fosen prosti (deanery) in the Diocese of Nidaros. The white, wooden church was built in a long church style in 1879 using plans drawn up by the architect Knut Guttormsen. The church seats 430 people. It was consecrated on 9 October 1879 by Bishop Andreas Grimelund.

== History ==
The earliest existing historical records of the church date back to the year 1329, but the church was not new that year. The first church was a stave church that was likely built in the 13th century on a site about 60 metres (200 ft) southeast of the present church site. The church was originally dedicated to John the Baptist. The church was historically known as Aa Church. The old church was repaired in 1675, 1684, and again in 1715. On 28 January 1770, the church burned down. Over the next couple years, a new church was built on the same site. It was consecrated on 8 July 1772. It was a wooden long church. Originally, it had a small tower on the roof.

In 1814, this church served as an election church (Norwegian: valgkirke). Together with more than 300 other parish churches across Norway, it was a polling station for elections to the 1814 Norwegian Constituent Assembly which wrote the Constitution of Norway. This was Norway's first national elections. Each church parish was a constituency that elected people called "electors" who later met together in each county to elect the representatives for the assembly that was to meet at Eidsvoll Manor later that year.

In 1849, the church was struck by lightning which caused some fire damage to the roof. During the reconstruction after this fire, the old tower was taken down and a large new tower was constructed on the west end of the building. By the late 1800s, the church was getting to be in poor condition. It was also getting too small for the congregation. In 1879, a new church was built about 60 metres (200 ft) northwest of the old church. The new building was consecrated on 9 October 1879. The old church was torn down in 1880.

== Media gallery ==
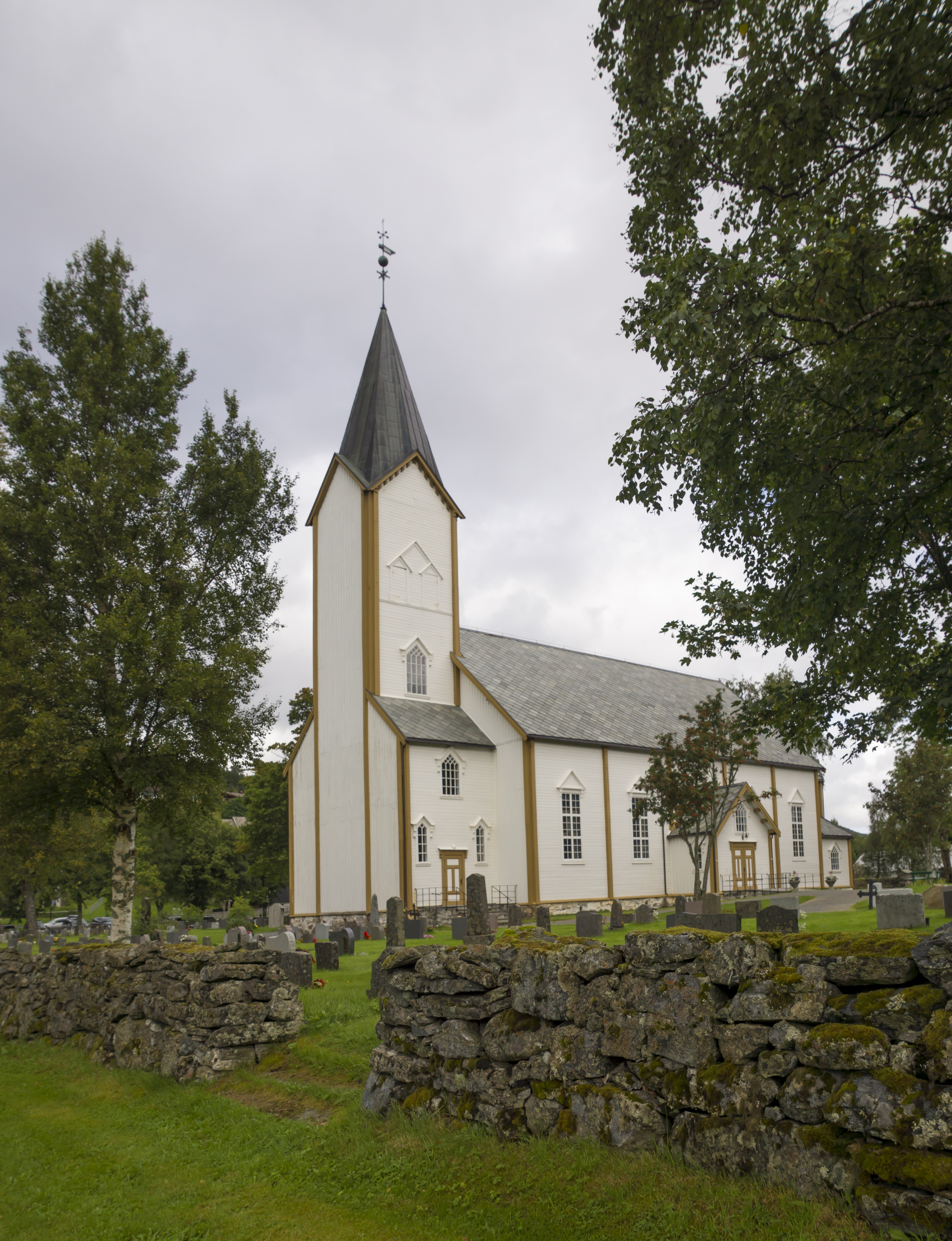
Exterior view (2013)

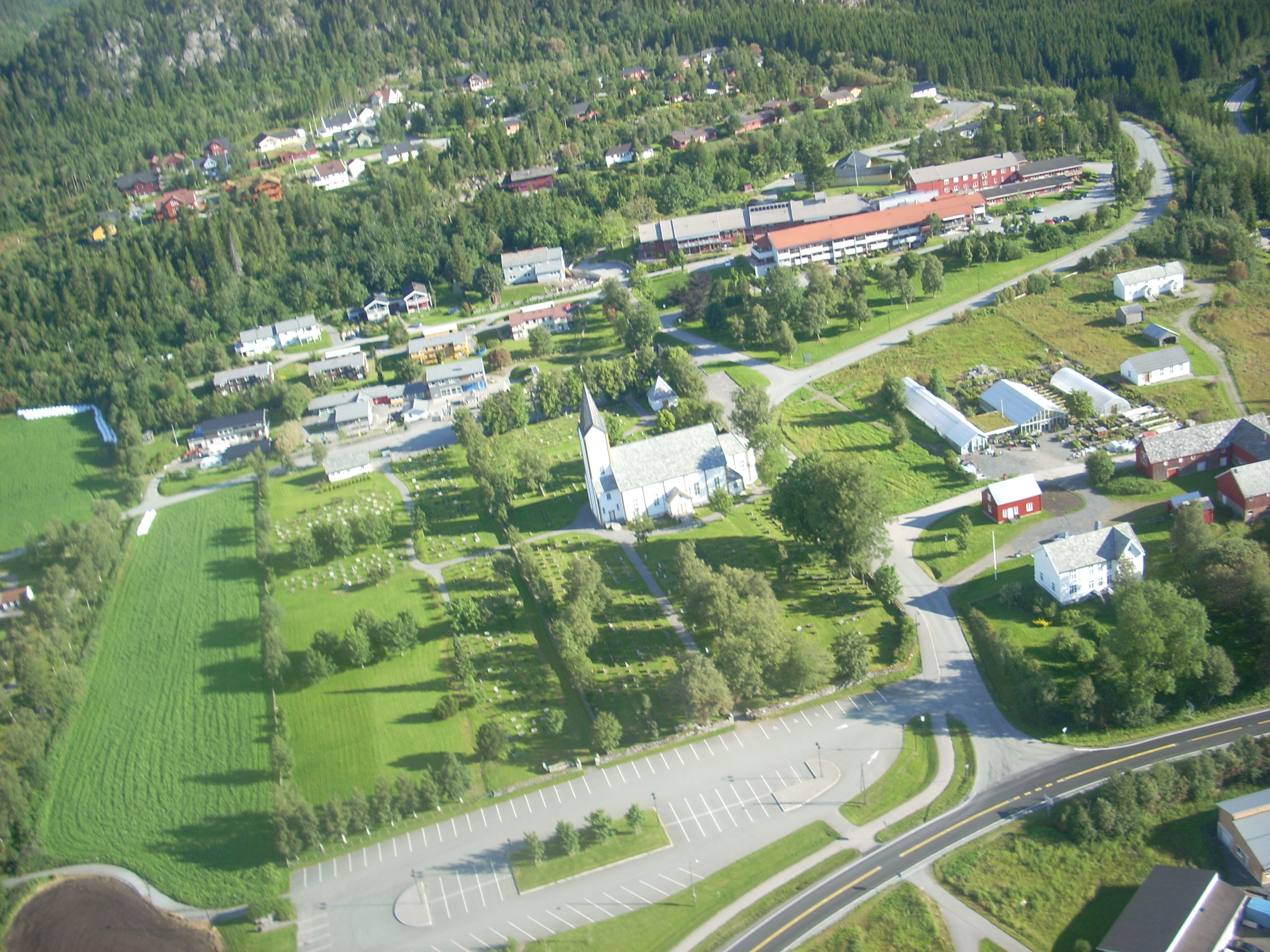
Aerial view

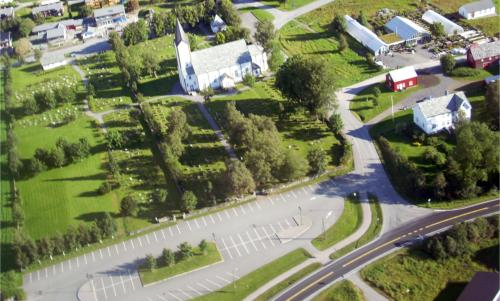
Aerial view of the graveyard

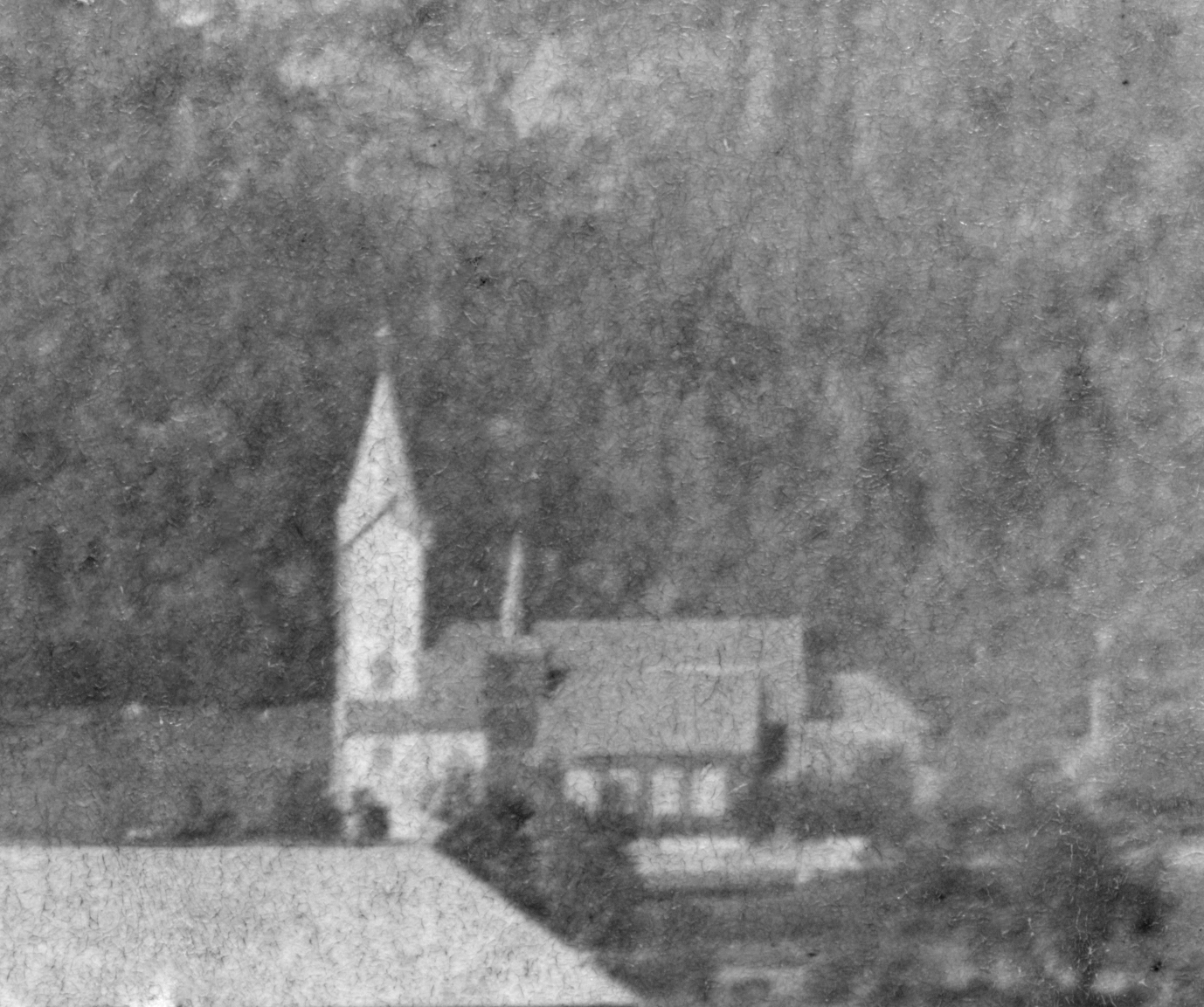
View of the church in 1879 with the old 1772 church right next to it before its demolition.

== See also ==
- List of churches in Nidaros
