= Holger Stjern =

Norwegian politician (1888–1968)

Holger Stjern (3 August 1888 – 19 January 1968) was a Norwegian politician for the Centre Party.

He was born in Åfjord Municipality and attended the agricultural school at Skjetlein. He ran a farm, a sawmill, a mill and his own power plant.

Stjern was a member of the municipal council of Stoksund Municipality from 1928 to 1955, serving as mayor from 1931. During the same period he met in Sør-Trøndelag county council, which was composed of the mayors. Among other local posts, he was a board member of Fosen Trafikklag.

He served as a deputy representative to the Parliament of Norway from Sør-Trøndelag during the terms 1945–1949 and 1950–1953. From 1948 to 1949 he met as a regular representative following the death of Nils Trædal.
