= Stokksundet =

Stokksundet may refer to:

- Stokksundet (Larvik), a strait in Larvik Municipality in Vestfold county, Norway
- Stokksundet (Møre og Romsdal), a strait in Herøy Municipality in Møre og Romsdal county, Norway
- Stokksundet (Trøndelag), a strait in Åfjord Municipality in Trøndelag county, Norway
- Stokksundet (Vestland), a sound between the islands of Bømlo and Stord in Vestland county, Norway

== See also ==
- Stoksund Municipality, a former municipality in Trøndelag county, Norway
