= Fembøring =

Traditional wooden boat

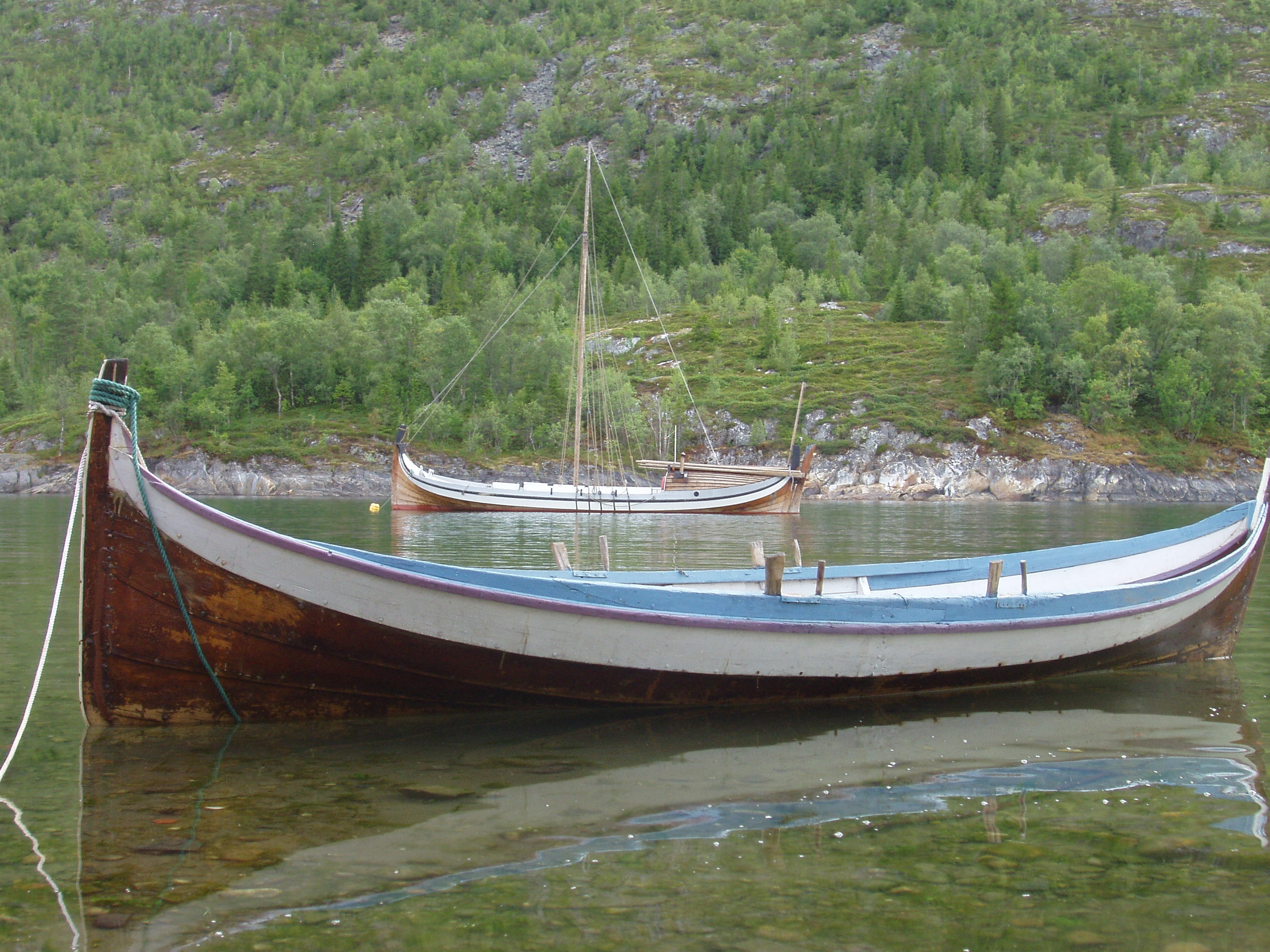
Boat resembling a fembøring on the Vefsna

A fembøring is an open, clinker-built, wooden boat of the Nordland or Åfjord type, with similar proportions and appearance as smaller boats of the type (such as faerings). Fembørings traditionally are constructed of fir or pine, are rowed or sailed, and were used as fishing boats.

== See also ==
- Viking ships
- Birlinn
- Karve
- Knarr
