= Michael Momyr =

Norwegian politician (born 1956)

Michael Momyr (born 8 August 1956 in Trondheim) is a Norwegian politician for the Conservative Party.

He was elected to the Norwegian Parliament from Sør-Trøndelag in 2001, but was not re-elected in 2005. He served in the position of deputy representative during the term 1993–1997, 1997–2001 and 2005–2009.

Momyr held various positions in the municipal council of Åfjord Municipality from 1987 to 1999, serving as deputy mayor in 1987–1990 and mayor from 1990 to 1995. He chaired the local party chapter from 1980 to 1988, and also the county chapter for some years. While chairing the county chapter he was also a member of the Conservative Party central committee.

Outside politics he had a military education. From 1979 to 1995 he worked as a farmer, and from 1995 to 1999 as a consultant for the Confederation of Norwegian Enterprise.
