= Stoksund Church =

Church in Trøndelag, Norway

- Stoksund kirke
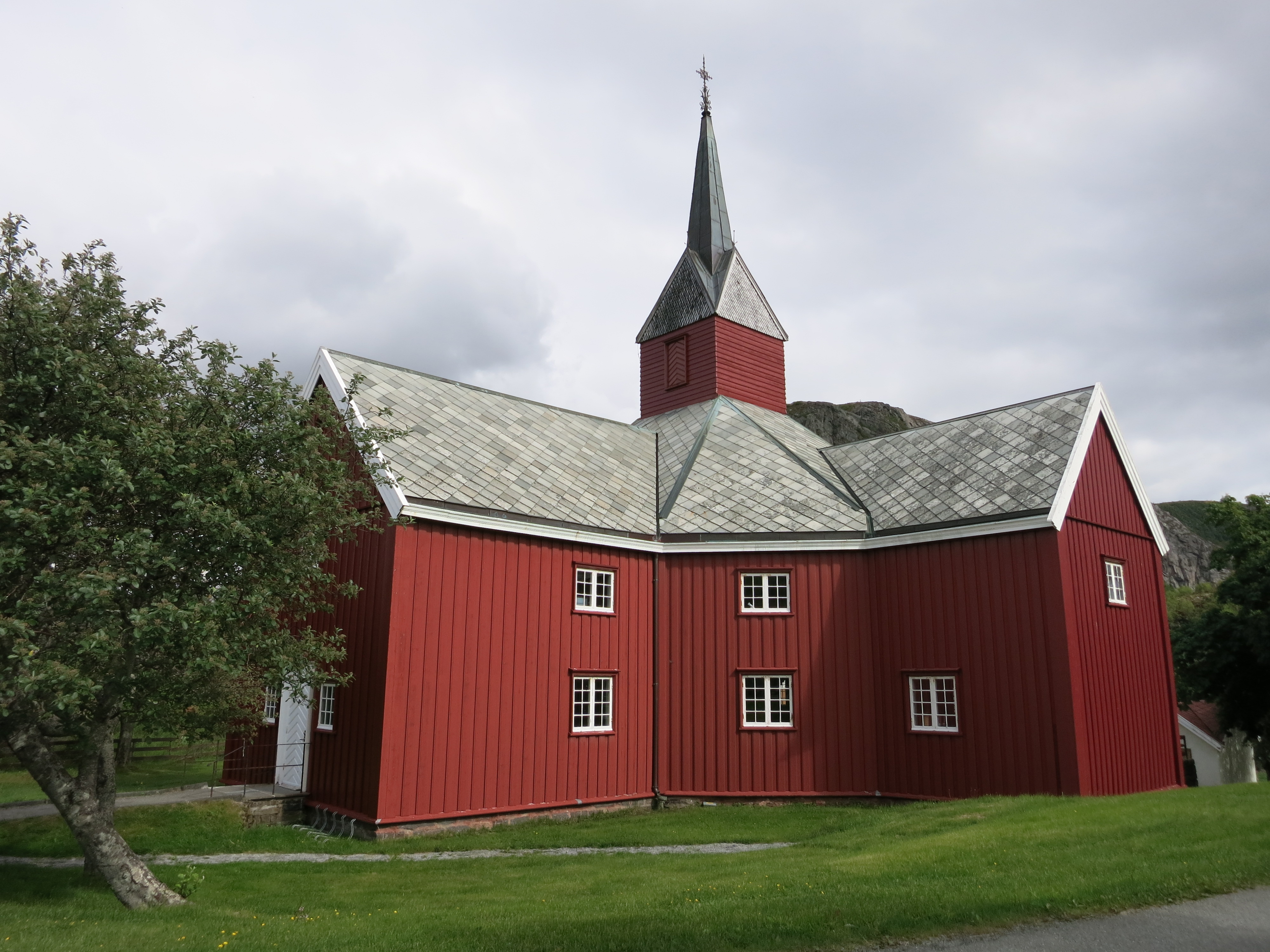
- View of the church
- Stoksund Church
- 64.03728504°N 10.04706412°E
- Location: Åfjord Municipality, Trøndelag
- Country: Norway
- Denomination: Church of Norway
- Churchmanship: Evangelical Lutheran

History
- Status: Parish church
- Founded: 14th century
- Consecrated: 10 July 1825

Architecture
- Functional status: Active
- Architect: Christian Ancher Collett
- Architectural type: Cruciform
- Completed: 1825 (201 years ago)

Specifications
- Capacity: 200
- Materials: Wood

Administration
- Diocese: Nidaros bispedømme
- Deanery: Fosen prosti
- Parish: Åfjord og Stoksund
- Norwegian Cultural Heritage Site
- Type: Church
- Status: Automatically protected
- ID: 85574

Stoksund Church (Norwegian: Stoksund kirke) is a parish church of the Church of Norway in Åfjord Municipality in Trøndelag county, Norway. It is located in the village of Revsnes, near the bridge to the island of Stokkøya. The church is located right at the south end of the Stokkøy Bridge from the mainland to the island of Stokkøya. It is one of two churches in the Åfjord og Stoksund parish which is part of the Fosen prosti (deanery) in the Diocese of Nidaros. The red, wooden church was built in a cruciform style in 1825 using plans drawn up by the architect Christian Ancher Collett and another unknown architect. The church seats about 200 people.

== History ==
The earliest existing historical records of the church date back to the year 1533, but the church was not new that year. The first church here was likely a small chapel that was built during the 14th century. Around the year 1670, the old chapel was torn down and replaced with a new Y-shaped church. By the year 1800, the church was rather dilapidated. In 1819, the local provost requested that the private owners of the church repair it, but they decided to build a new one instead. In 1825, a new church was constructed about 70 metres (230 ft) northwest of the old church. It was moved to the top of a small hill a little further away from the other farm buildings, presumably to help prevent the spread of fires and give it a more prominent location. The new church had an octagonal design that measured 14 by 11 metres (46 ft × 36 ft) which was designed by an unknown local architect who worked with Christian Ancher Collett, a consultant for the Ministry of Church Affairs. It was consecrated on 10 July 1825 by Bishop Peder Olivarius Bugge.

In the 1880s, there was a desire to expand the church that was too cramped for the congregation. In the summer of 1885, the building was extended with square cross arms to the north and south, giving the building a more cruciform design. At the same time the entrance areas in the extension were built, the building got new and larger windows, and the altar was moved into the northern cross arm. The changes in 1885 were planned by architect Ole Falck Ebbell. In the 1950s, the building was in poor condition so the architect John Egil Tverdahl prepared plans for a restoration and renovation of the building. During the restoration in 1954-1955, the extensions from 1885 were demolished and completely rebuilt. A new sacristy was built on the eastern end of the building and the altar was moved back to the eastern part of the nave.

== See also ==
- List of churches in Nidaros
