= Stordalsvatnet =

Lake in Åfjord, Norway

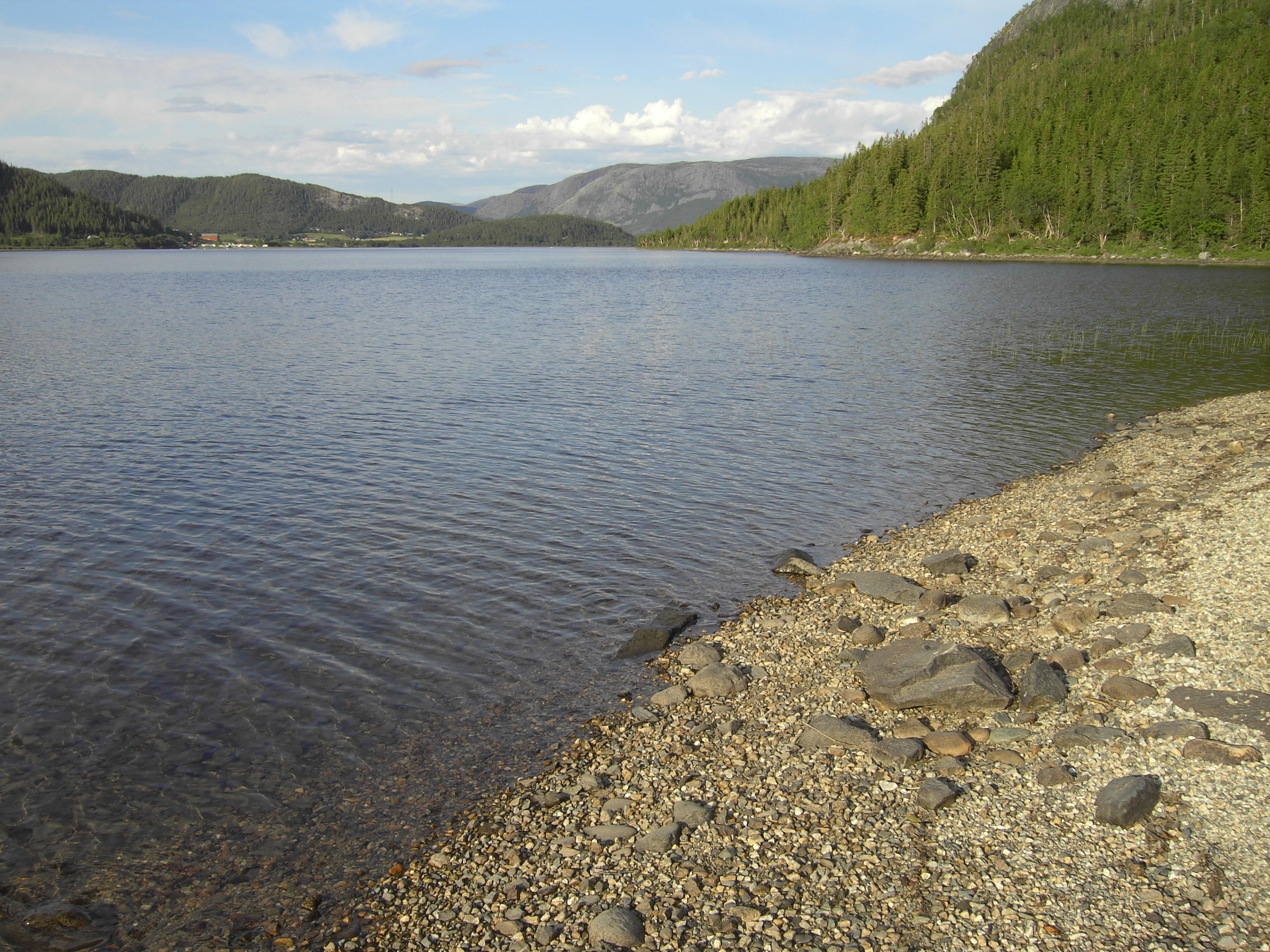
- Interactive map of the lake
- Location: Åfjord Municipality, Trøndelag
- Coordinates: 63.9696°N 10.3001°E
- Primary inflows: Stordalselva
- Primary outflows: Stordalselva
- Basin countries: Norway
- Max. length: 5.5 kilometres (3.4 mi)
- Max. width: 1 kilometre (0.62 mi)
- Surface area: 4.22 km^{2} (1.63 sq mi)
- Shore length^{1}: 19.24 kilometres (11.96 mi)
- Surface elevation: 19 metres (62 ft)
- References: NVE
- ^{1} Shore length is not a well-defined measure.

Stordalsvatnet is a lake in Åfjord Municipality in Trøndelag county, Norway. The lake is located on the Stordalselva river which flows into the Åfjorden. The lake lies between the villages of By (on the east end) and Årnes (on the west end).

== See also ==
- List of lakes in Norway
