= Harsvika =

Village in Åfjord Municipality, Norway

- Village
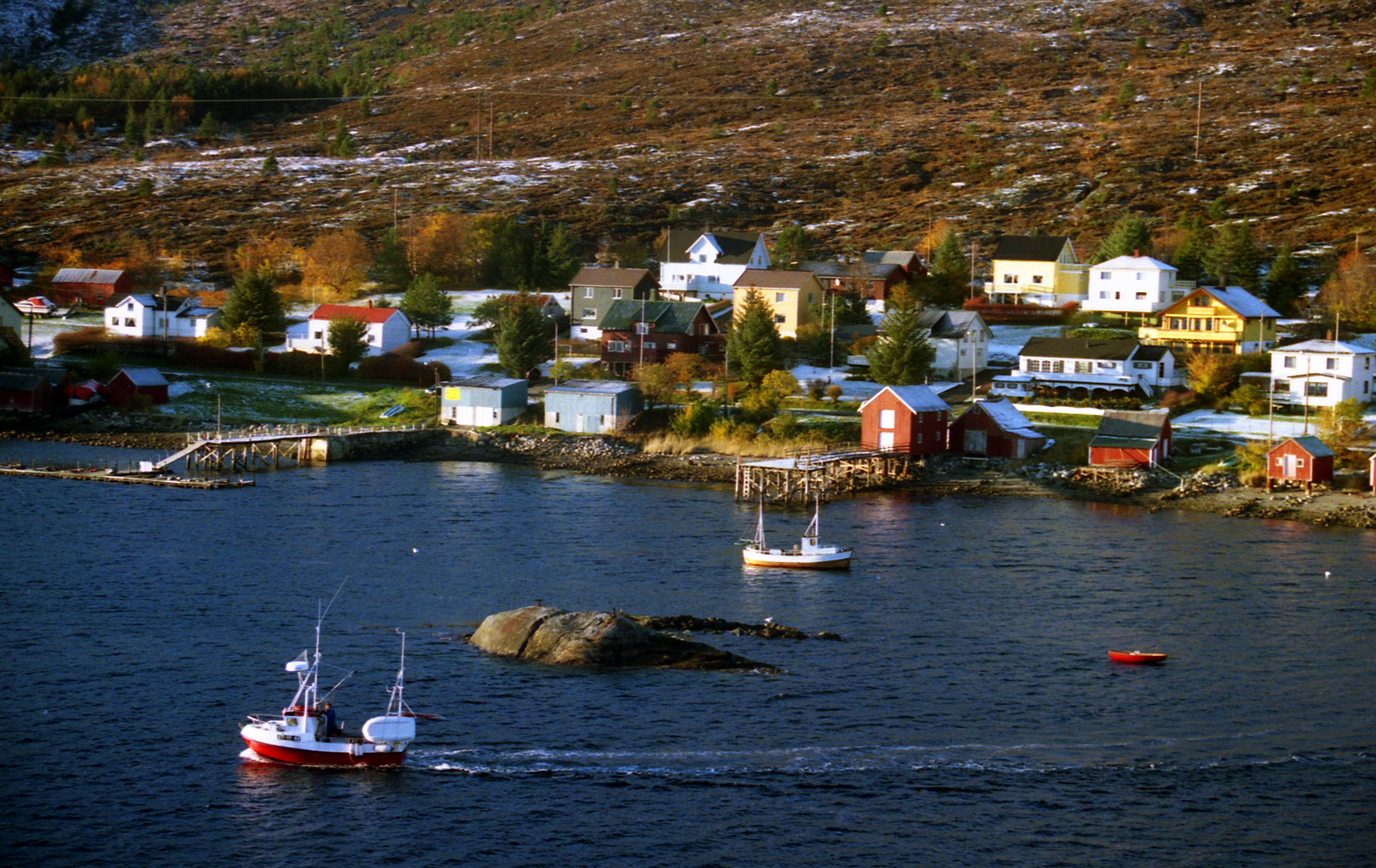
- View of the village
- Interactive map of Harsvika
- Location within Trøndelag Location within Norway
- Coordinates: 64.0452°N 10.0087°E
- Country: Norway
- Region: Central Norway
- County: Trøndelag
- District: Fosen
- Municipality: Åfjord Municipality
- Elevation: 4 m (13 ft)
- Time zone: UTC+01:00 (CET)
  - Summer (DST): UTC+02:00 (CEST)
- Post Code: 7177 Revsnes

Harsvika is a village in Åfjord Municipality in Trøndelag county, Norway. It is located on the south side of the island of Stokkøya in the northwestern part of the municipality. The north end of the Stokkøy Bridge lies just east of Harsvika, connecting it to the village of Revsnes on the mainland.
