= By, Norway =

Village in Åfjord Municipality, Norway

By
- Village
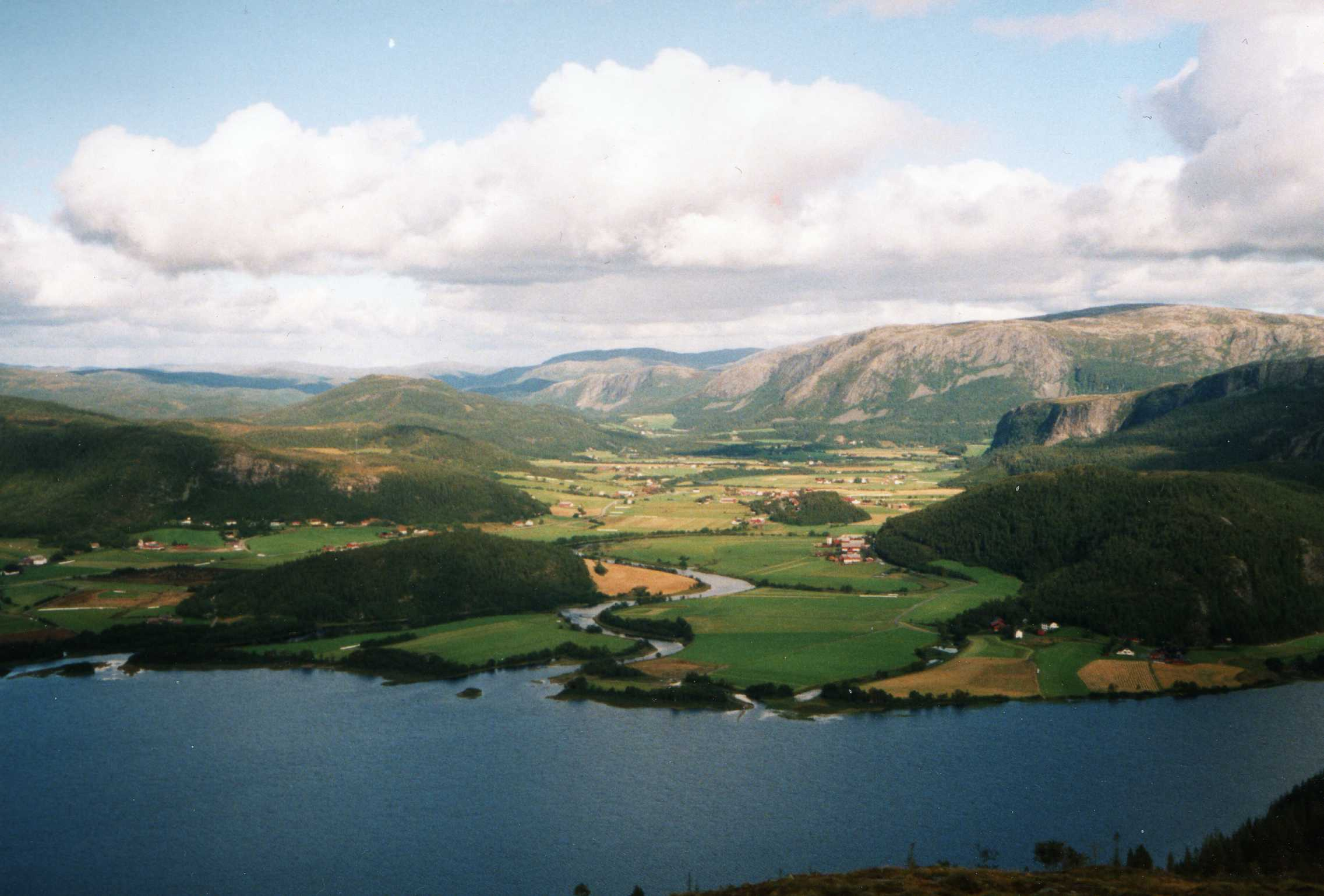
- View of the village
- Interactive map of By
- Location within Trøndelag Location within Norway
- Coordinates: 63.9836°N 10.4220°E
- Country: Norway
- Region: Central Norway
- County: Trøndelag
- District: Fosen
- Municipality: Åfjord Municipality
- Elevation: 30 m (98 ft)
- Time zone: UTC+01:00 (CET)
  - Summer (DST): UTC+02:00 (CEST)
- Post Code: 7170 Åfjord

By is a village in Åfjord Municipality in Trøndelag county, Norway. It is located along the river Stordalselva, just east of the lake Stordalsvatnet, which is about 10 kilometres (6.2 mi) east of the municipal centre of Å i Åfjord.

== See also ==
- List of short place names
