= Lauvøya, Åfjord =

Island in Trøndelag, Norway

Lauvøya
- Interactive map of Lauvøya

Geography
- Location: Trøndelag, Norway
- Coordinates: 63.9302°N 09.9315°E
- Area: 2.5 km^{2} (0.97 sq mi)
- Length: 2 km (1.2 mi)
- Width: 2 km (1.2 mi)
- Coastline: 10 km (6 mi)
- Highest elevation: 24 m (79 ft)
- Highest point: Kukfjellet

Administration
- Norway
- County: Trøndelag
- Municipality: Åfjord Municipality

Lauvøya is an island in Åfjord Municipality in Trøndelag county, Norway. It is located about 4 kilometres (2.5 mi) northeast of the village of Lysøysundet, near the mouth of the Åfjorden.

The island is connected to the mainland by a 1-kilometre (0.62 mi) long causeway. The island is located south of the islands of Linesøya and Stokkøya. There are about 25 inhabitants on the 2.5-square-kilometre (1.0 sq mi) island.

== See also ==
- List of islands of Norway
