= Linesøya =

Island in Trøndelag, Norway

Linesøya Vågsøya
- Interactive map of Linesøya; Vågsøya

Geography
- Location: Trøndelag, Norway
- Coordinates: 64.0136°N 09.9168°E
- Area: 16.6 km^{2} (6.4 sq mi)
- Length: 6 km (3.7 mi)
- Width: 4 km (2.5 mi)
- Highest elevation: 230 m (750 ft)
- Highest point: Linesfjellet

Administration
- Norway
- County: Trøndelag
- Municipality: Åfjord Municipality

Linesøya is an island in Åfjord Municipality in Trøndelag county, Norway. It lies about 3 kilometres (1.9 mi) off the coast of the mainland of Åfjord, and 1 kilometre (0.62 mi) southwest of the island of Stokkøya. The 16.6-square-kilometre (6.4 sq mi) island also lies about 6.5 kilometres (4.0 mi) north of the smaller island of Lauvøya. The highest point on Linesøya is the 230-metre (750 ft) tall mountain Linesfjellet.

After the completion in 2011 of the Linesøy Bridge between Linesøya and Stokkøya and the Stokkøy Bridge from Stokkøya to the mainland, there has been a ferry-free road to the mainland from Linesøya.

== Media gallery ==
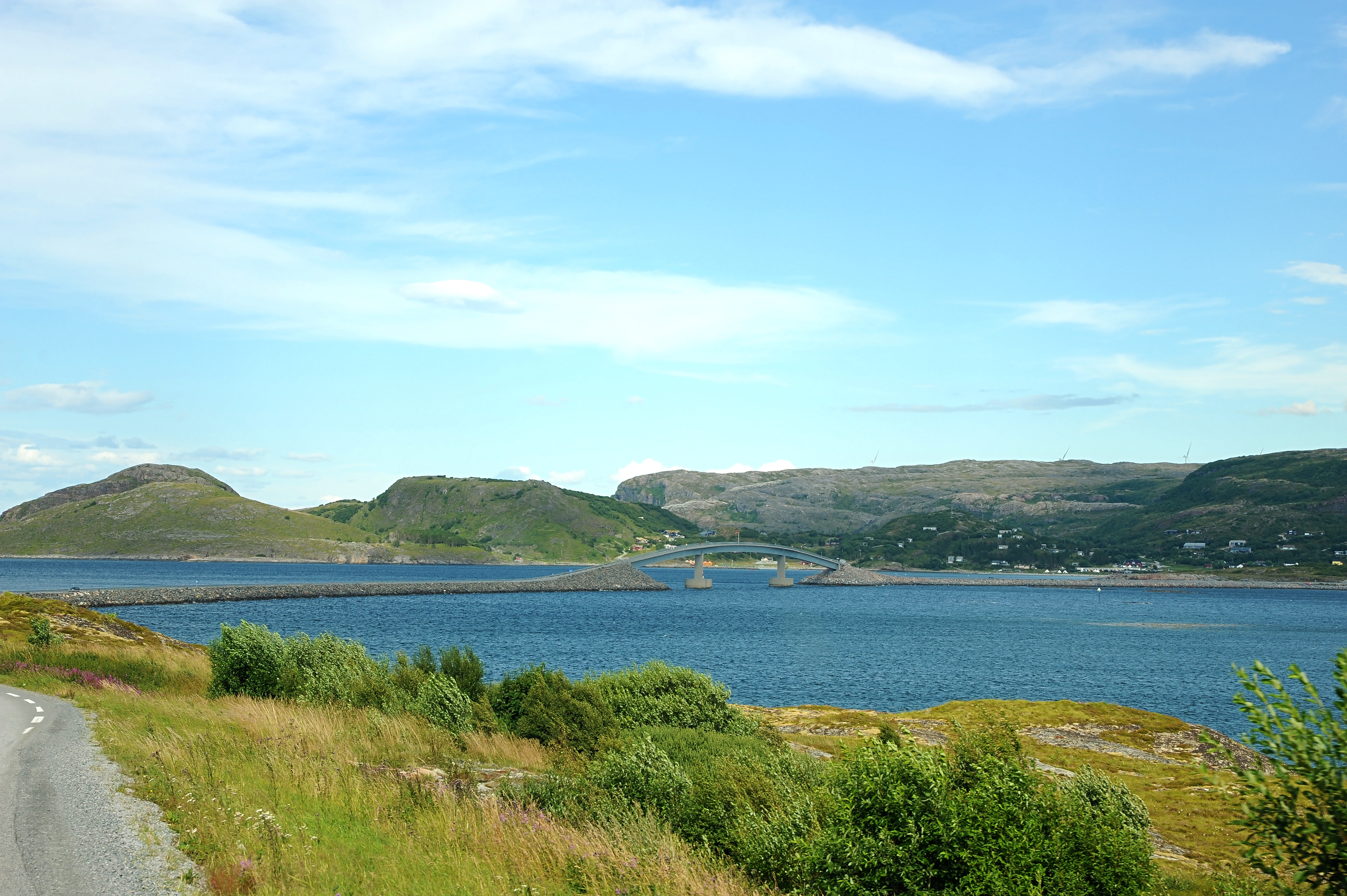
Linesøy Bridge

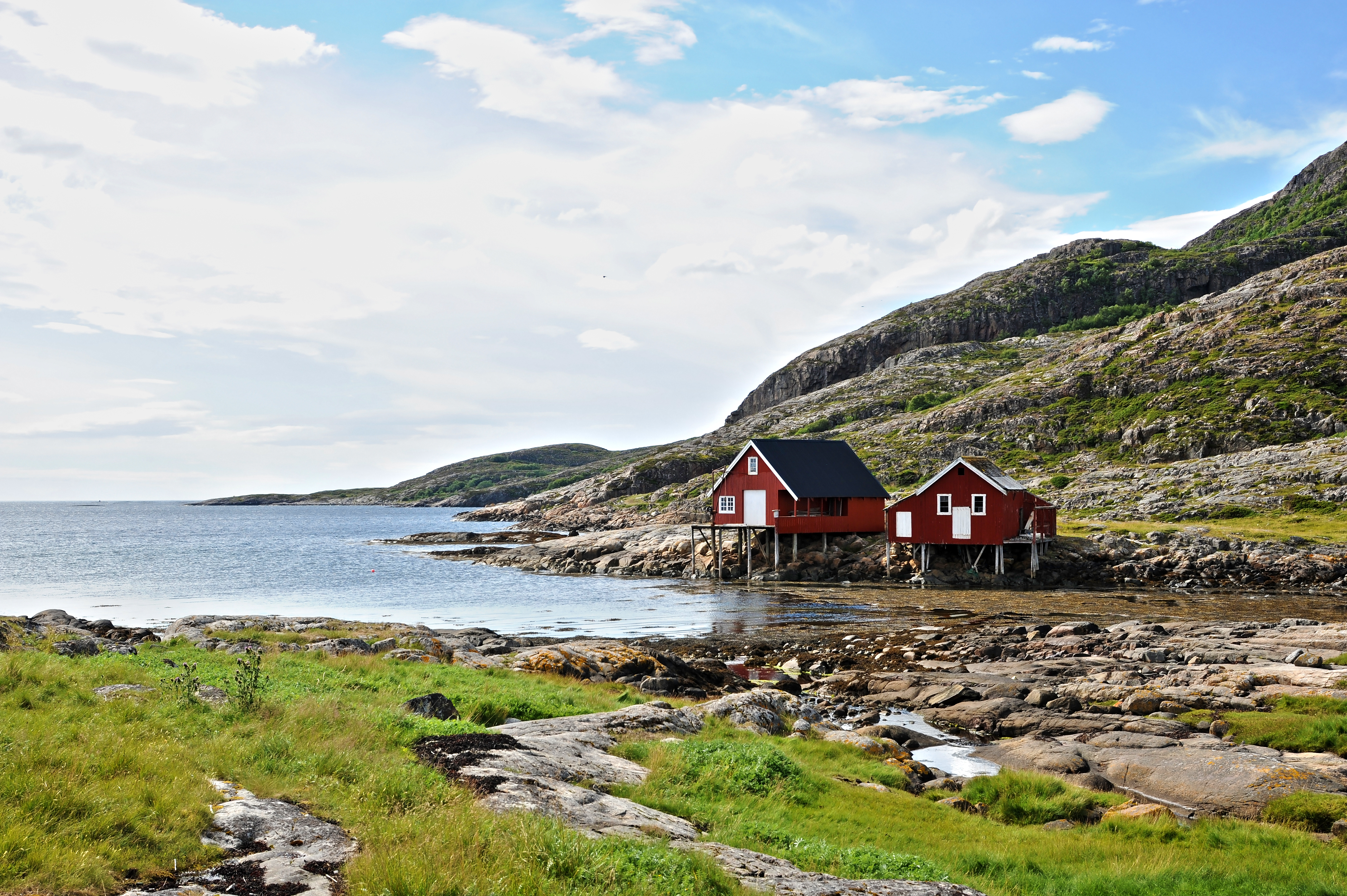
Linesøya and Frohavet

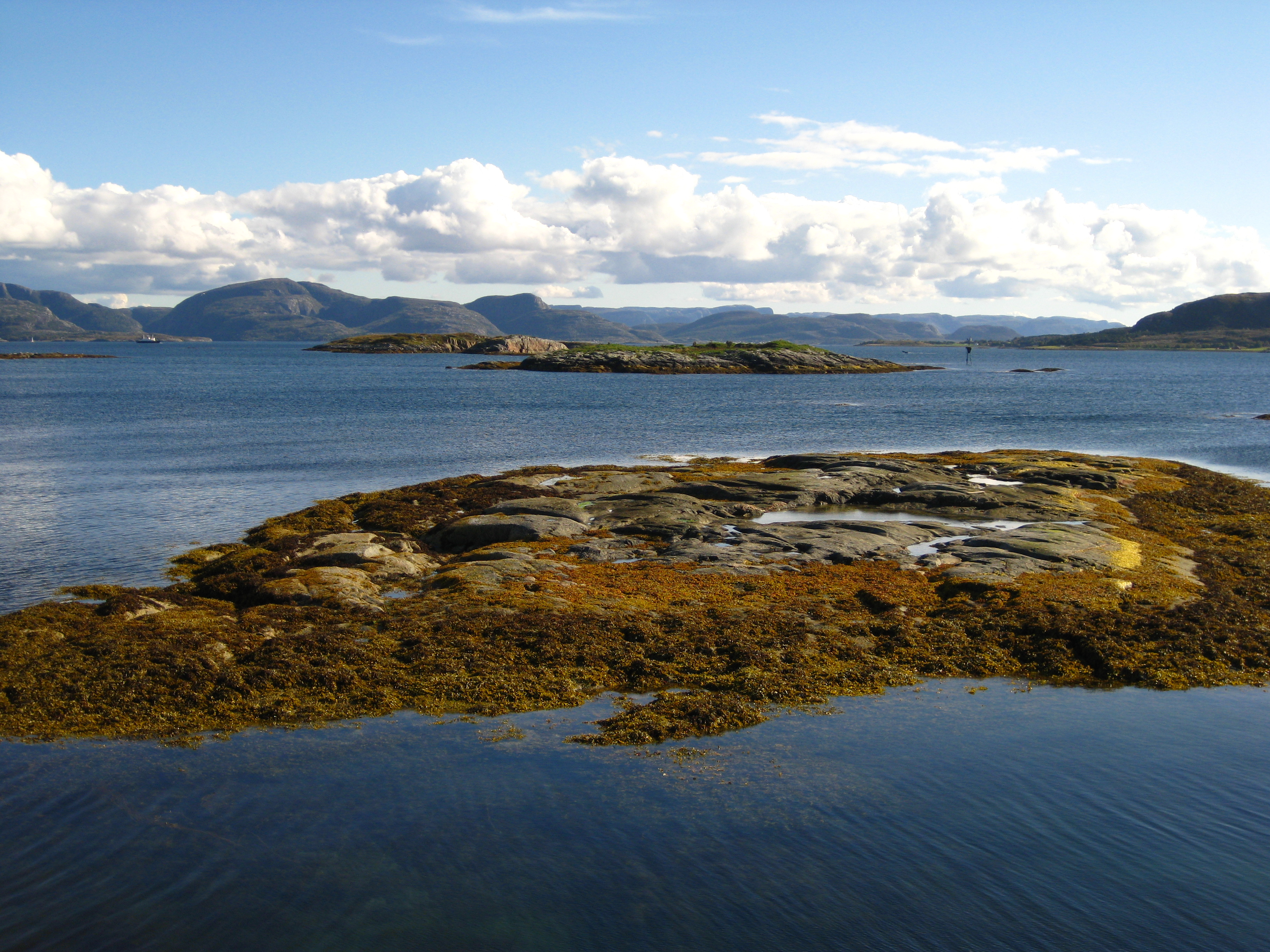
View of Linesøya

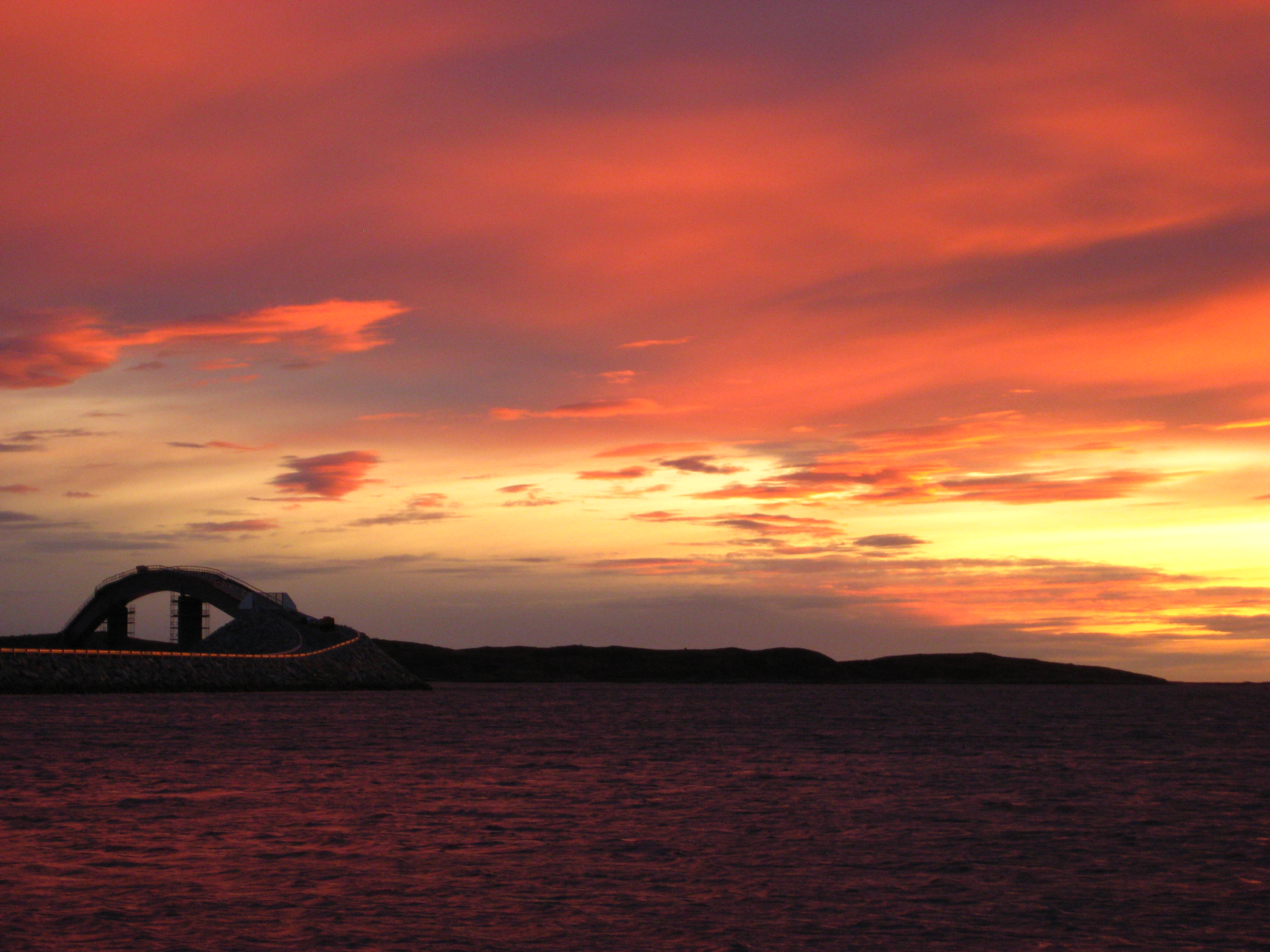
Bridge between Stokkøya and Linesøya

== See also ==
- List of islands of Norway
