= Stoksund Municipality =

Former municipality in Sør-Trøndelag, Norway

Stoksund Municipality Stoksund herred
- Former municipality
- Stokksund herred (historic name)
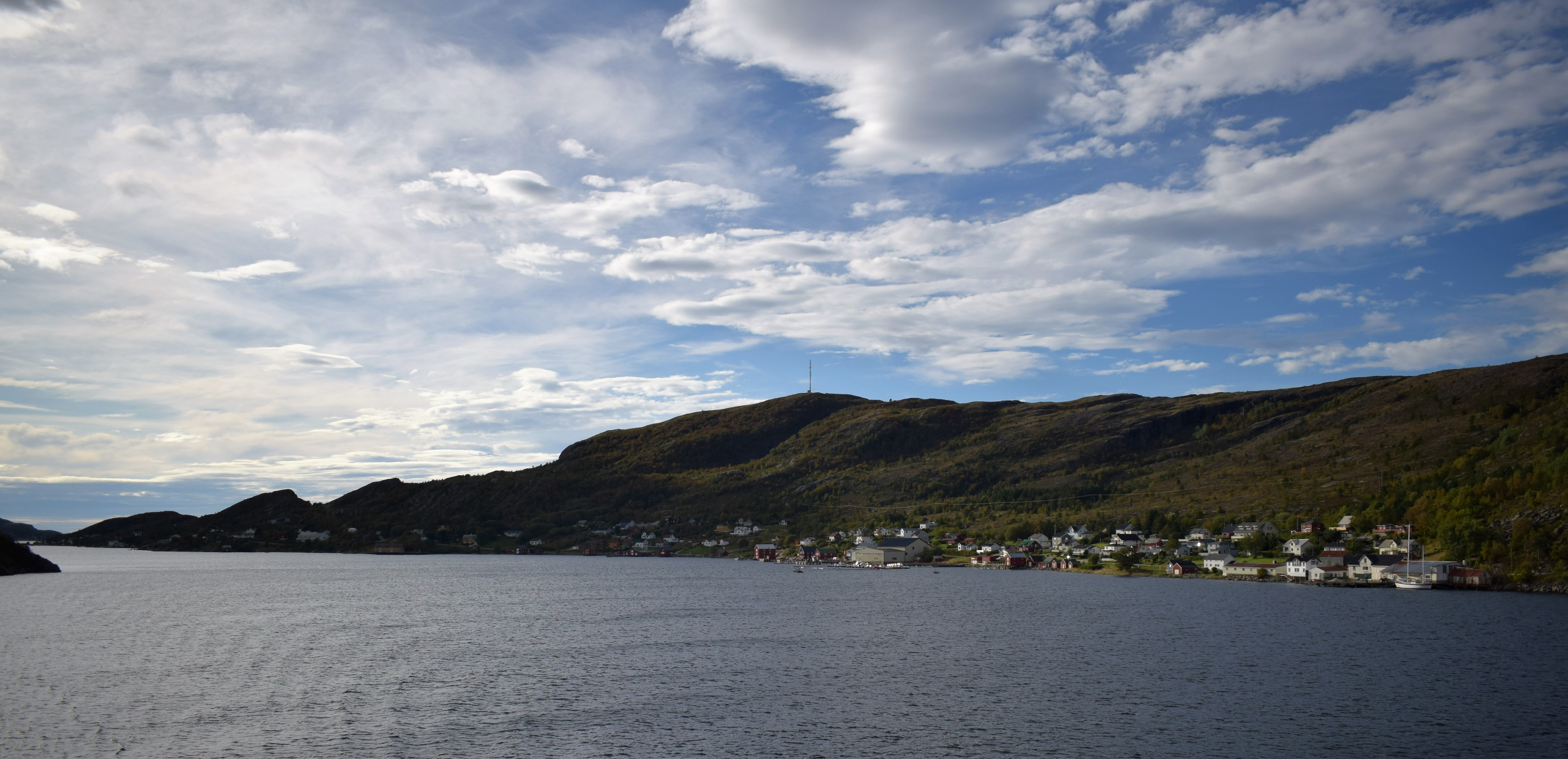
- View of Harsvika in Stoksund

- Sør-Trøndelag within Norway

- Stoksund within Sør-Trøndelag
- Coordinates: 64°02′14″N 10°02′49″E
- Country: Norway
- County: Sør-Trøndelag
- District: Fosen
- Established: 1 June 1892
  - Preceded by: Bjørnør Municipality
- Disestablished: 1 Jan 1964
  - Succeeded by: Åfjord Municipality
- Administrative centre: Revsnes

Government
  - Mayor (1960–1963): Konrad Solberg (Ap)

Area (upon dissolution)
  - Total: 114.2 km^{2} (44.1 sq mi)
  - Rank: #493 in Norway
- Highest elevation: 407 m (1,335 ft)

Population (1963)
  - Total: 1,537
  - Rank: #530 in Norway
  - Density: 13.5/km^{2} (35/sq mi)
  - Change (10 years): ▼ −1.7%
- Demonym: Stokksunding

Official language
  - Norwegian form: Bokmål
- Time zone: UTC+01:00 (CET)
  - Summer (DST): UTC+02:00 (CEST)
- ISO 3166 code: NO-1631

Stoksund is a former municipality in the old Sør-Trøndelag county, Norway. The municipality existed from 1892 until its dissolution in 1964. The 114-square-kilometre (44 sq mi) municipality was located in what is now Åfjord Municipality in Trøndelag county. The municipality included the islands of Stokkøya and Linesøya plus many surrounding islets, and the surrounding area of the mainland. The administrative centre was the village of Revsnes, where the Stoksund Church is located.

Prior to its dissolution in 1964, the 114-square-kilometre (44 sq mi) municipality was the 493rd largest by area out of the 689 municipalities in Norway. Stoksund Municipality was the 530th most populous municipality in Norway with a population of about 1,537. The municipality's population density was 13.5 inhabitants per square kilometre (35/sq mi) and its population had decreased by 1.7% over the previous 10-year period.

== General information ==
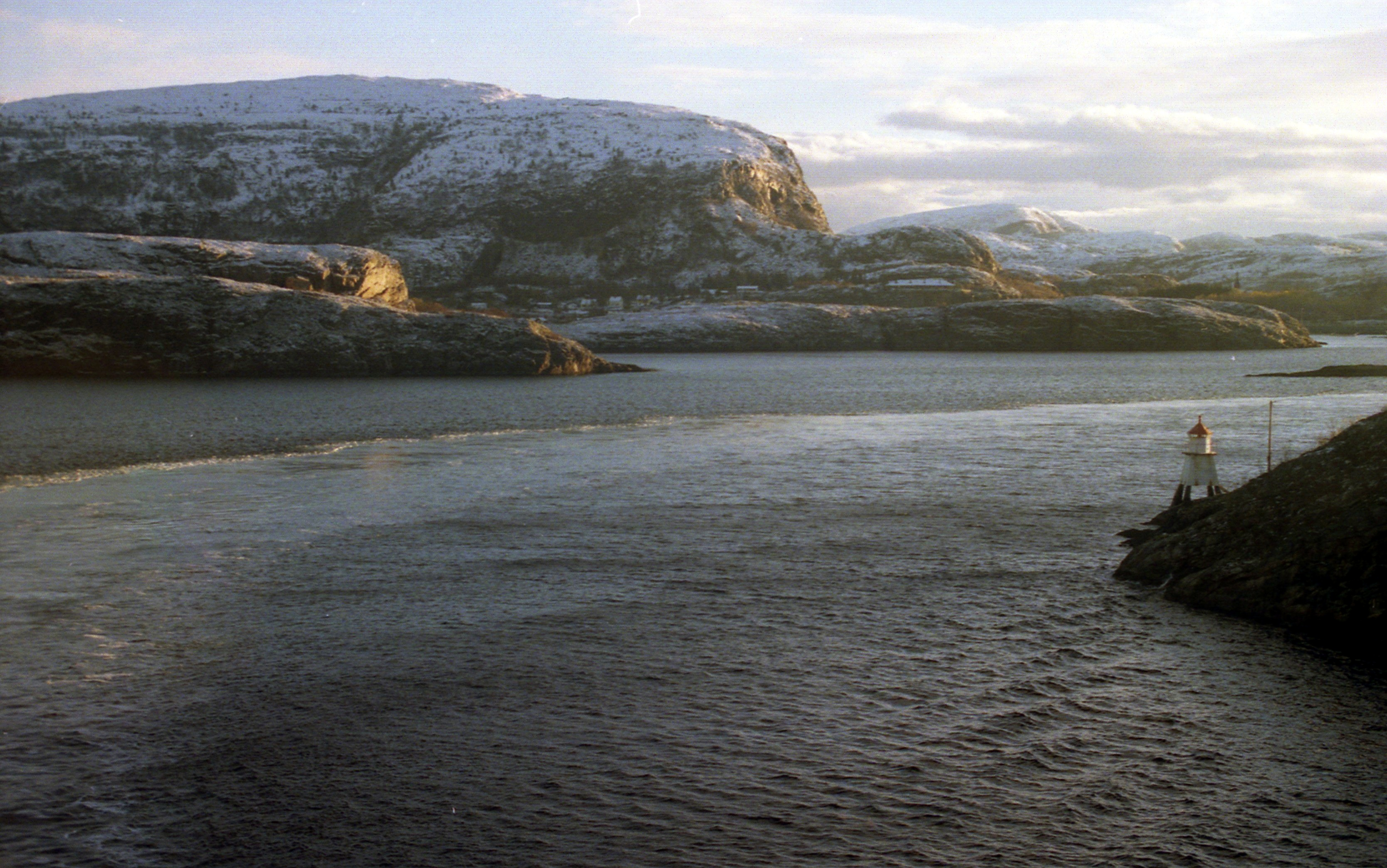
Stoksundet sound

The municipality of Stoksund was established on 1 June 1892 when the old Bjørnør Municipality was divided into three parts: Stoksund Municipality (population: 1,122) in the south, Osen Municipality (population: 1,575) in the north, and Roan Municipality (population: 2,069) in the centre. During the 1960s, there were many municipal mergers across Norway due to the work of the Schei Committee. On 1 January 1964, Stoksund Municipality (population: 1,515) was merged into the neighboring Åfjord Municipality (population: 2,643) to its south.

=== Name ===
The municipality (originally the parish) is named after the Stoksund strait which runs between the island of Stokkøya and the mainland. The first element of the name comes from the Old Norse word stokkr which means "log" or "stick". The last element is sund which means "strait" or "channel". The municipal name was spelled Stoksund, with one "k", but today the name of the area is often spelled as "Stokksund". Currently, the official name of the area according to the Norwegian Mapping and Cadastre Authority uses Stokksund, with the letter "k" used two times. There is no official documentation that exists that shows an official change in the spelling of "Stoksund" to or from "Stokksund".

=== Churches ===
The Church of Norway had one parish (sokn) within Roan Municipality. At the time of the municipal dissolution, it was part of the Bjørnør prestegjeld and the Fosen prosti (deanery) in the Diocese of Nidaros.

Churches in Stoksund Municipality
Parish (sokn)	Church name	Location of the church	Year built
Stoksund	Stoksund Church	Revsnes	1825

== Geography ==
The coastal municipality was located on the Fosen peninsula along the shore of the Norwegian Sea. It was bordered by Roan Municipality to the northeast and by Åfjord Municipality to the east and south. The highest point in the municipality was the 407-metre (1,335 ft) tall mountain Lavassfjellet.

== Government ==
While it existed, Stoksund Municipality was responsible for primary education (through 10th grade), outpatient health services, senior citizen services, welfare and other social services, zoning, economic development, and municipal roads and utilities. The municipality was governed by a municipal council of directly elected representatives. The mayor was indirectly elected by a vote of the municipal council. The municipality was under the jurisdiction of the Frostating Court of Appeal.

=== Municipal council ===
The municipal council (Herredsstyre) of Stoksund Municipality was made up of 17 representatives that were elected to four year terms. The tables below show the historical composition of the council by political party.

Stoksund herredsstyre 1959–1963
Party name (in Norwegian)	Number of representatives
Labour Party (Arbeiderpartiet)	3
Local List(s) (Lokale lister)	14
Total number of members:	17
Note: On 1 January 1964, Stoksund Municipality became part of Åfjord Municipality.

Stoksund herredsstyre 1955–1959
Party name (in Norwegian)	Number of representatives
Labour Party (Arbeiderpartiet)	2
Local List(s) (Lokale lister)	15
Total number of members:	21

Stoksund herredsstyre 1951–1955
Party name (in Norwegian)	Number of representatives
Labour Party (Arbeiderpartiet)	5
Local List(s) (Lokale lister)	11
Total number of members:	16

Stoksund herredsstyre 1947–1951
Party name (in Norwegian)	Number of representatives
Labour Party (Arbeiderpartiet)	5
Christian Democratic Party (Kristelig Folkeparti)	1
Local List(s) (Lokale lister)	10
Total number of members:	16

Stoksund herredsstyre 1945–1947
Party name (in Norwegian)	Number of representatives
Local List(s) (Lokale lister)	16
Total number of members:	16

Stoksund herredsstyre 1937–1941*
Party name (in Norwegian)	Number of representatives
Labour Party (Arbeiderpartiet)	3
Conservative Party (Høyre)	7
Joint List(s) of Non-Socialist Parties (Borgerlige Felleslister)	6
Total number of members:	16
Note: Due to the German occupation of Norway during World War II, no elections were held for new municipal councils until after the war ended in 1945.

=== Mayors ===
The mayor (Norwegian: ordfører) of Stoksund Municipality was the political leader of the municipality and the chairperson of the municipal council. Here is a list of people who held this position:

- 1892–1898: Karolius Sørdal
- 1899–1907: Jonas C. Refsnes (V)
- 1908–1910: Eilert Andersen Herfjord
- 1911–1913: Jonas C. Refsnes (V)
- 1914–1916: Eilert Andersen Herfjord
- 1917–1919: Kristian Lian (H)
- 1920–1925: Samson Harbak
- 1926–1928: Kristian Sørgjerd (V)
- 1929–1931: Kristian Lian (H)
- 1932–1941: Holger Stjern (Bp)
- 1941–1942: Ola Kobberød (NS)
- 1942–1945: Martin Eilertsen Herfjord (NS)
- 1945–1955: Holger Stjern (Bp)
- 1956–1960: Magne Sydskjør (H)
- 1960–1963: Konrad Solberg (Ap)

== See also ==
- List of former municipalities of Norway
