= Linesøy Bridge =

Linesøy Bridge Linesøybrua
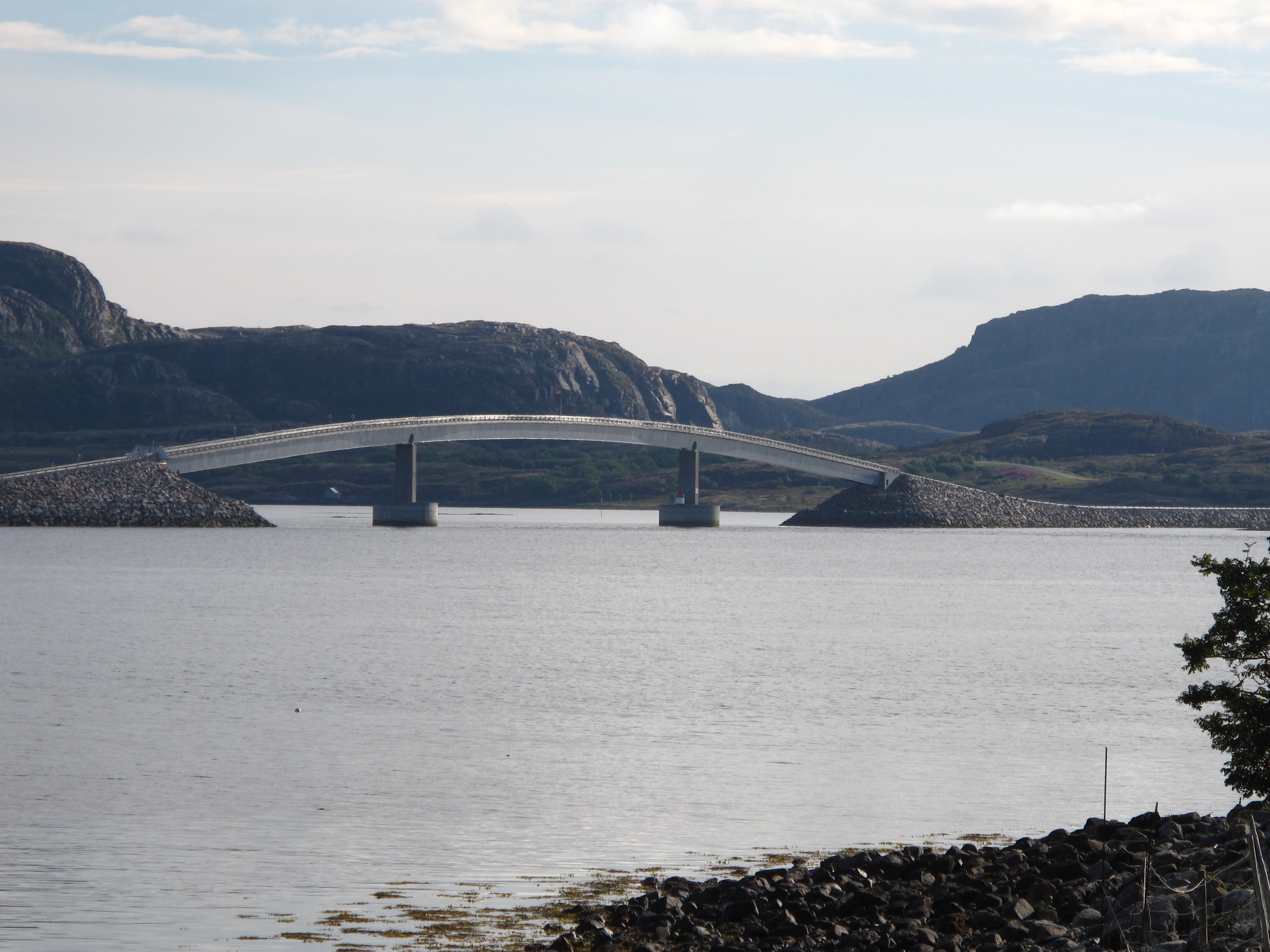
- View of the bridge
- Coordinates: 64°02′56″N 9°55′26″E

Characteristics
- Design: Cantilever bridge
- Material: Concrete
- Total length: 315 metres (1,033 ft)
- Width: 28 metres (92 ft)
- Clearance above: 16 metres (52 ft)

History
- Opened: 7 Oct 2011

Linesøy Bridge (Norwegian: Linesøybrua) is a cantilever bridge and causeway which connects the islands of Linesøya and Stokkøya in Åfjord Municipality in Trøndelag county, Norway. The bridge opened on 7 October 2011 and replaced the Kjerkholmen–Linesøy Ferry. The concrete bridge is 315-metre (1,033 ft) long.
