= Stokkøya =

Island in Trøndelag, Norway

- Interactive map of Stokkøya

Geography
- Location: Trøndelag, Norway
- Coordinates: 64.0632°N 09.9806°E
- Area: 16.7 km^{2} (6.4 sq mi)
- Length: 5 km (3.1 mi)
- Width: 5 km (3.1 mi)
- Highest elevation: 225 m (738 ft)
- Highest point: Kamman

Administration
- Norway
- County: Trøndelag
- Municipality: Åfjord Municipality

Stokkøya is an island in Åfjord Municipality in Trøndelag county, Norway. The 16.7-square-kilometre (4,100-acre) island is located in the northern part of the municipality. The largest village on the island is Harsvika. The 225-metre (738 ft) tall mountain Kamman is the highest point on the island.

Stokkøya is connected to the mainland by the Stokkøy Bridge between the villages of Harsvika and Revsnes on the mainland. The Linesøy Bridge is being built connecting Stokkøya to the island of Linesøya to the southwest. The smaller island of Lauvøya lies about 10 kilometres (6.2 mi) to the south.

The island was the namesake of the old Stoksund Municipality which existed until 1964.

== Media gallery ==
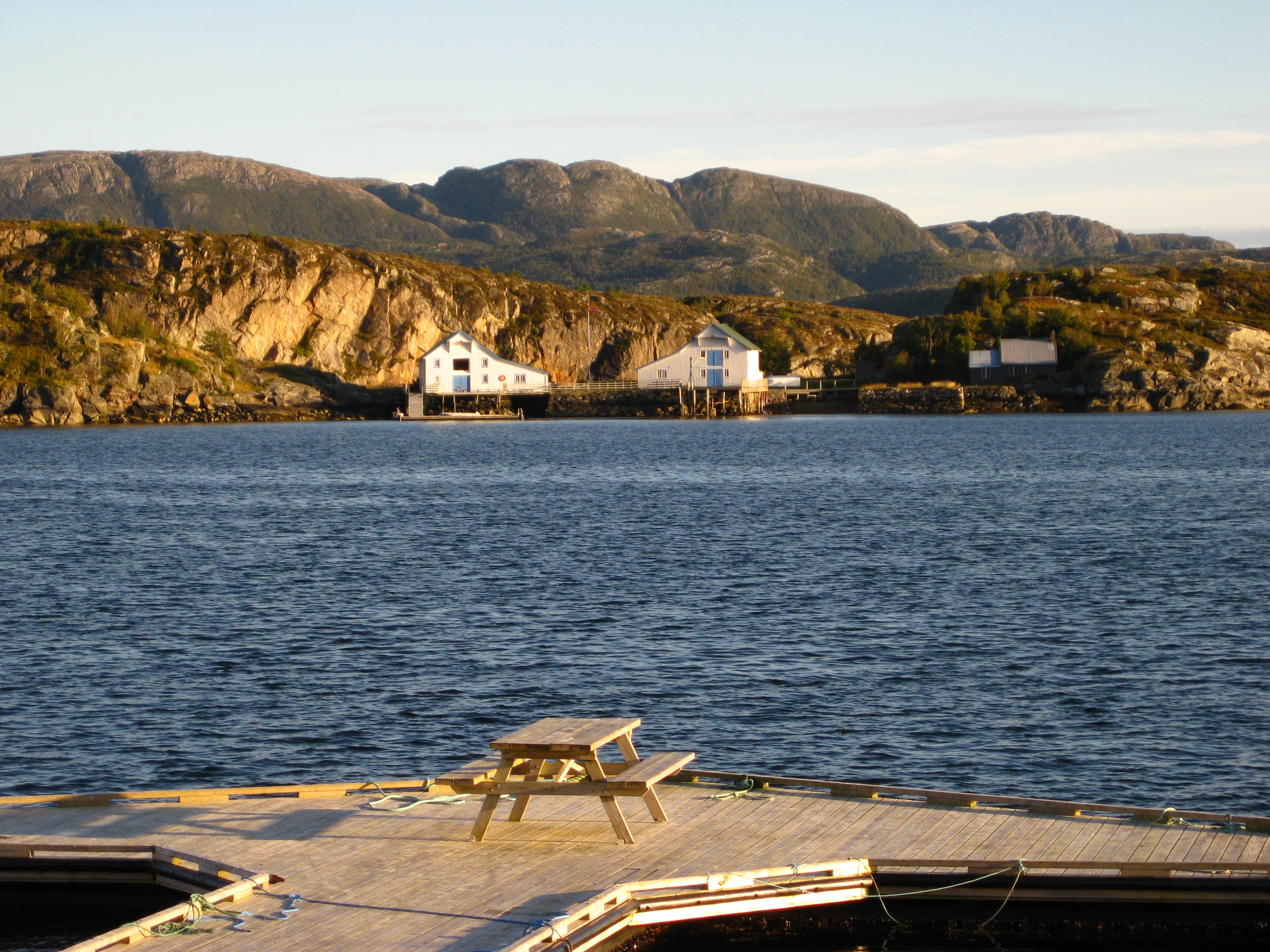
View of the island

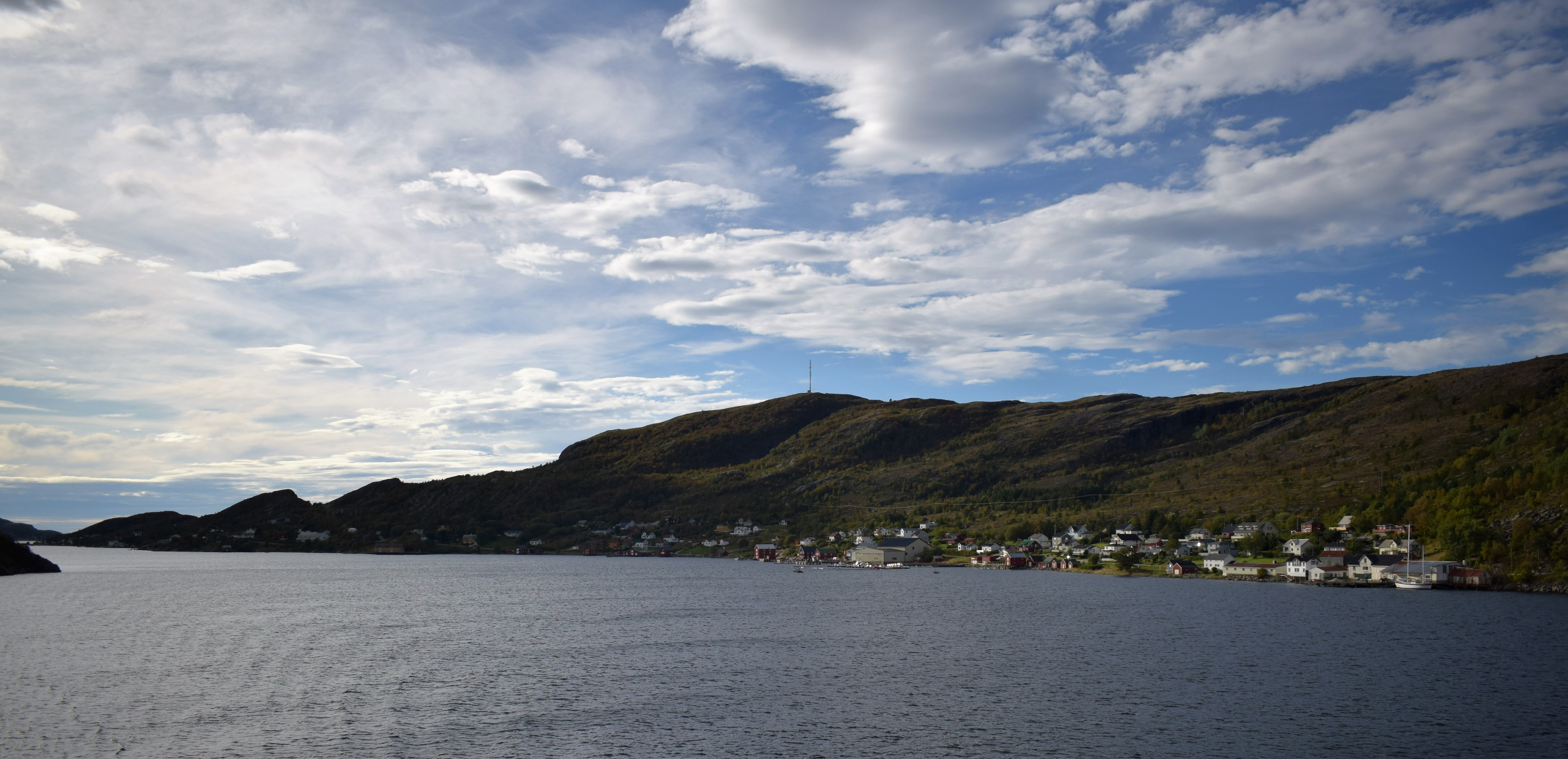
Harsvika village

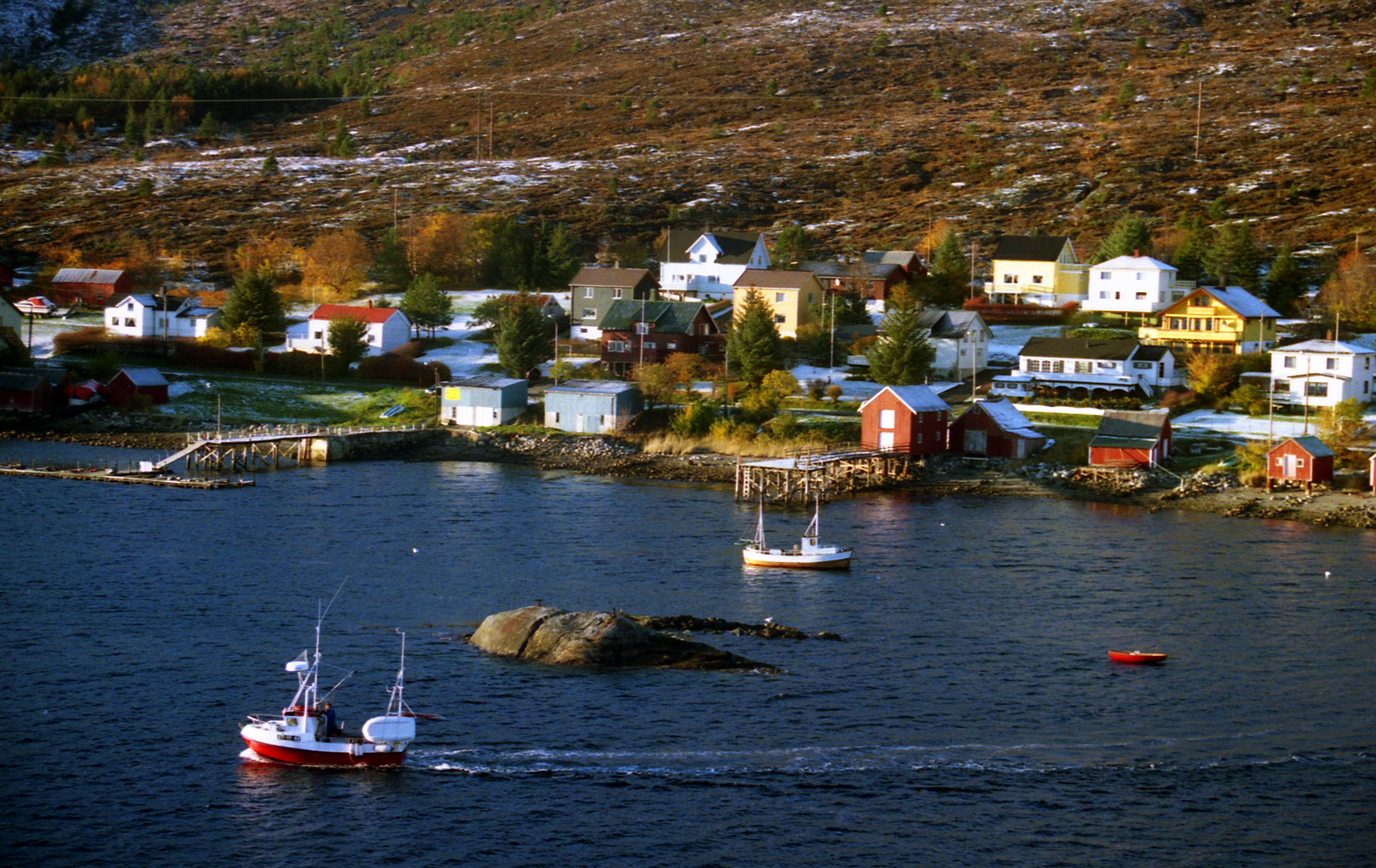
Harsvika village

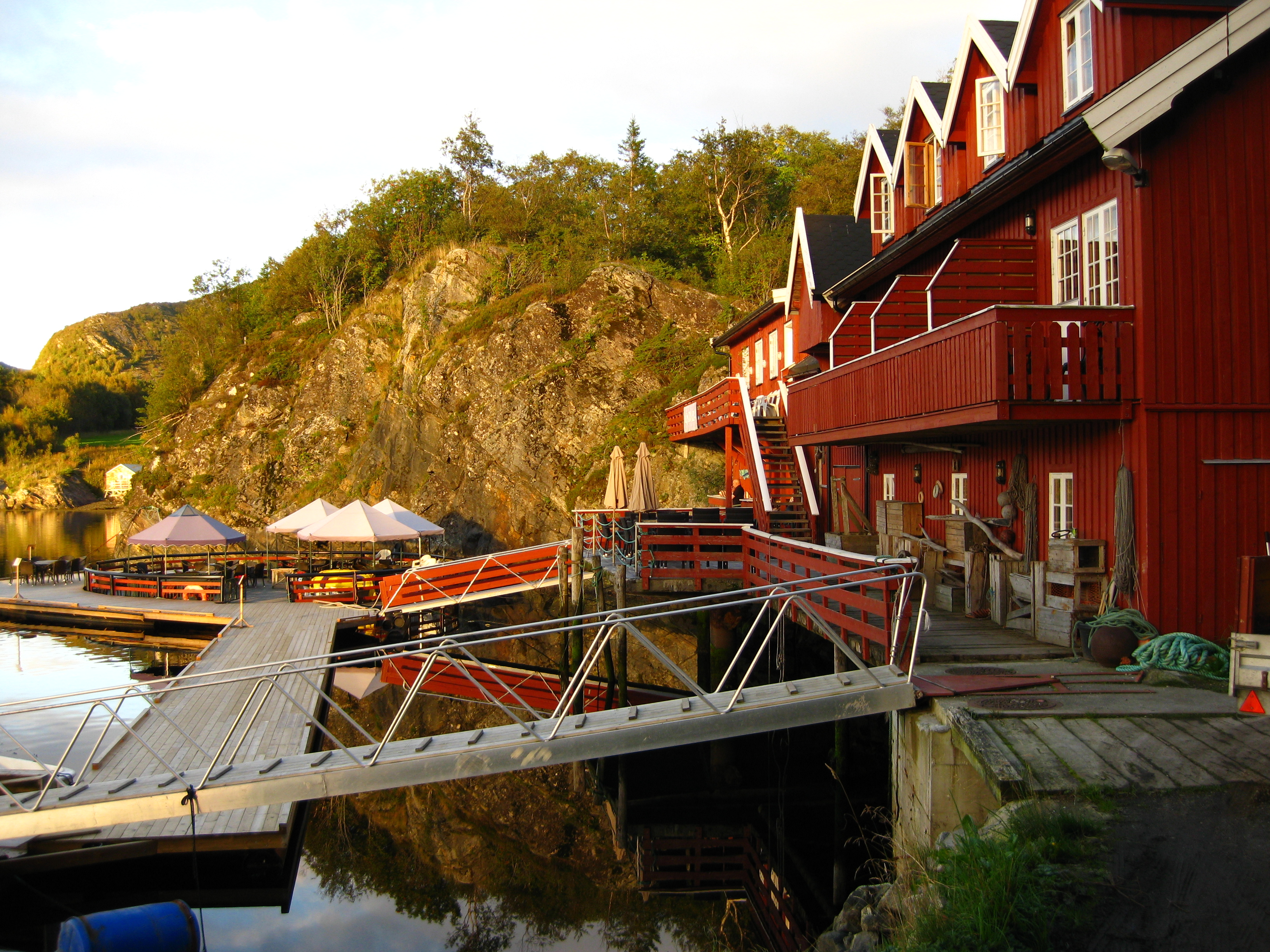
Harbour buildings

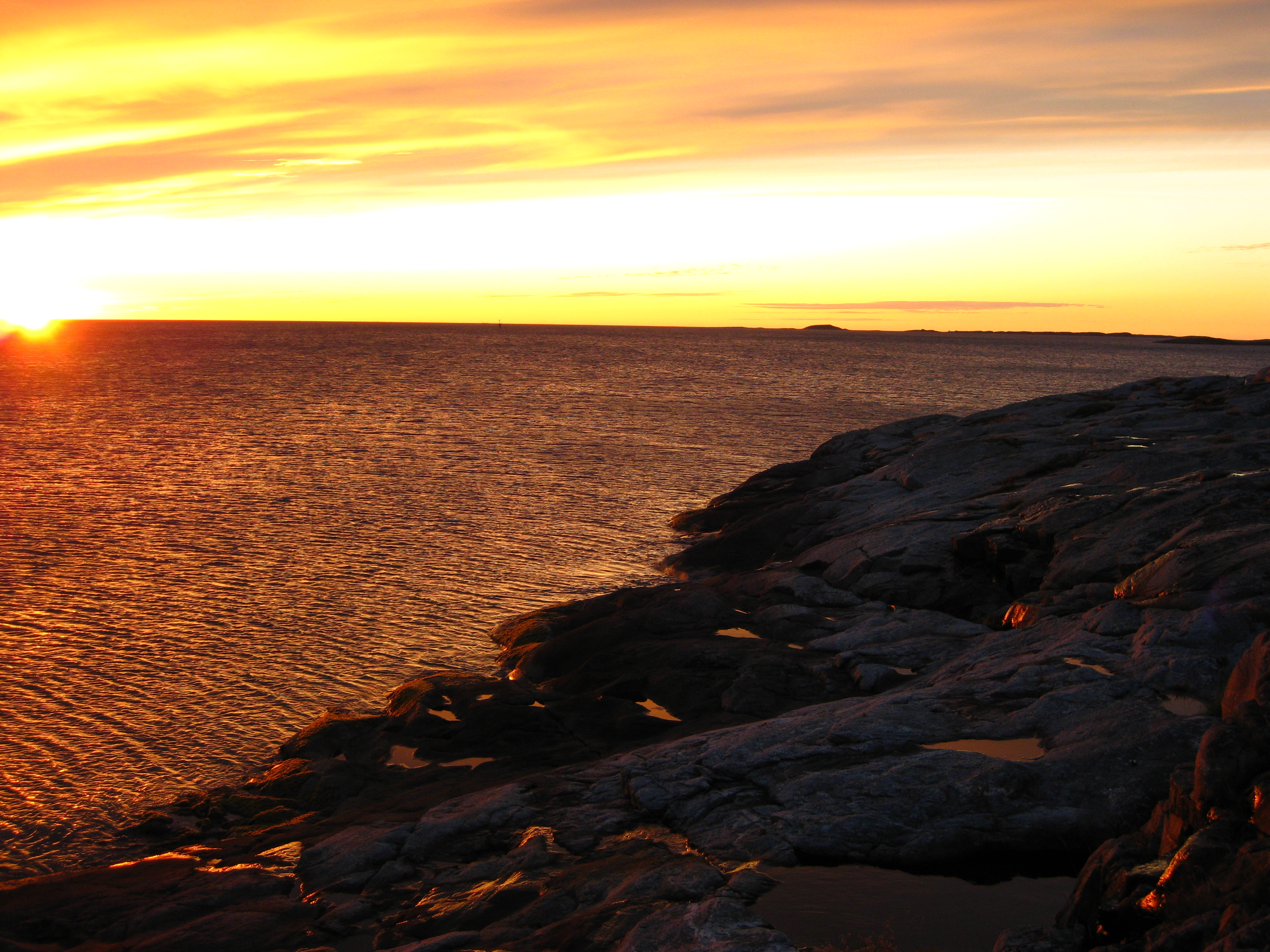
Sunset on Stokkøya

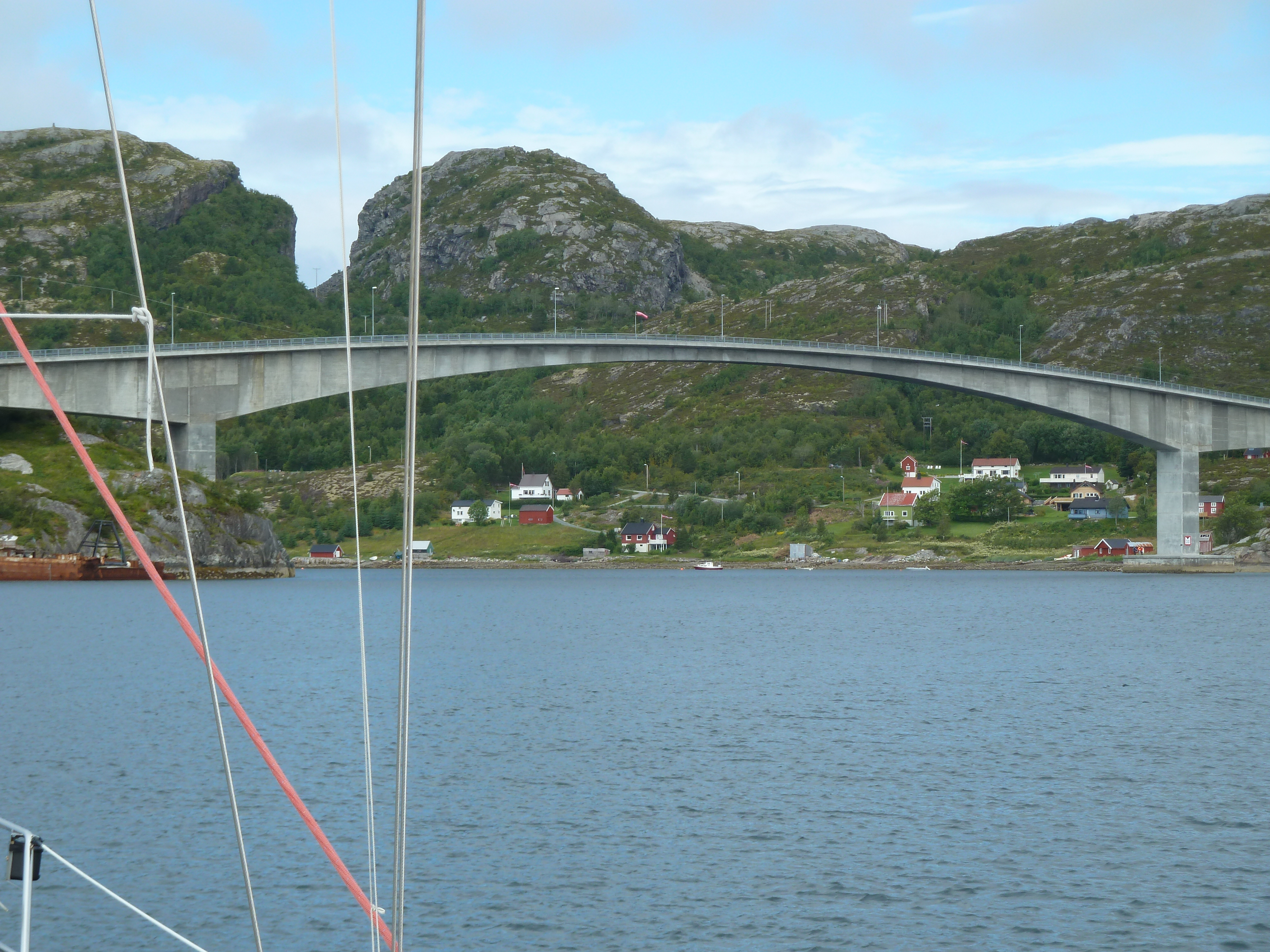
Stokkøy Bridge

== See also ==
- List of islands of Norway
