= Revsnes, Trøndelag =

Village in Åfjord Municipality, Norway

Revsnes Stoksund
- Village
- Interactive map of Revsnes
- Location within Trøndelag Location within Norway
- Coordinates: 64.0395°N 10.0725°E
- Country: Norway
- Region: Central Norway
- County: Trøndelag
- District: Fosen
- Municipality: Åfjord Municipality
- Elevation: 8 m (26 ft)
- Time zone: UTC+01:00 (CET)
  - Summer (DST): UTC+02:00 (CEST)
- Post Code: 7177 Revsnes

Revsnes or Stoksund is a village in Åfjord Municipality in Trøndelag county, Norway. The village is located on the mainland in the northwestern part of the municipality. The village lies near the south end of the Stokkøy Bridge, about 3 kilometres (1.9 mi) southeast of the village of Harsvika on the island of Stokkøya. Stoksund Church is located in Revsnes.

From 1892-1964, Revsnes was the administrative centre of the old Stoksund Municipality.
