= Å, Åfjord =

Village in Åfjord Municipality, Norway

Åfjord Å / Å i Åfjord / Årnes
- Village
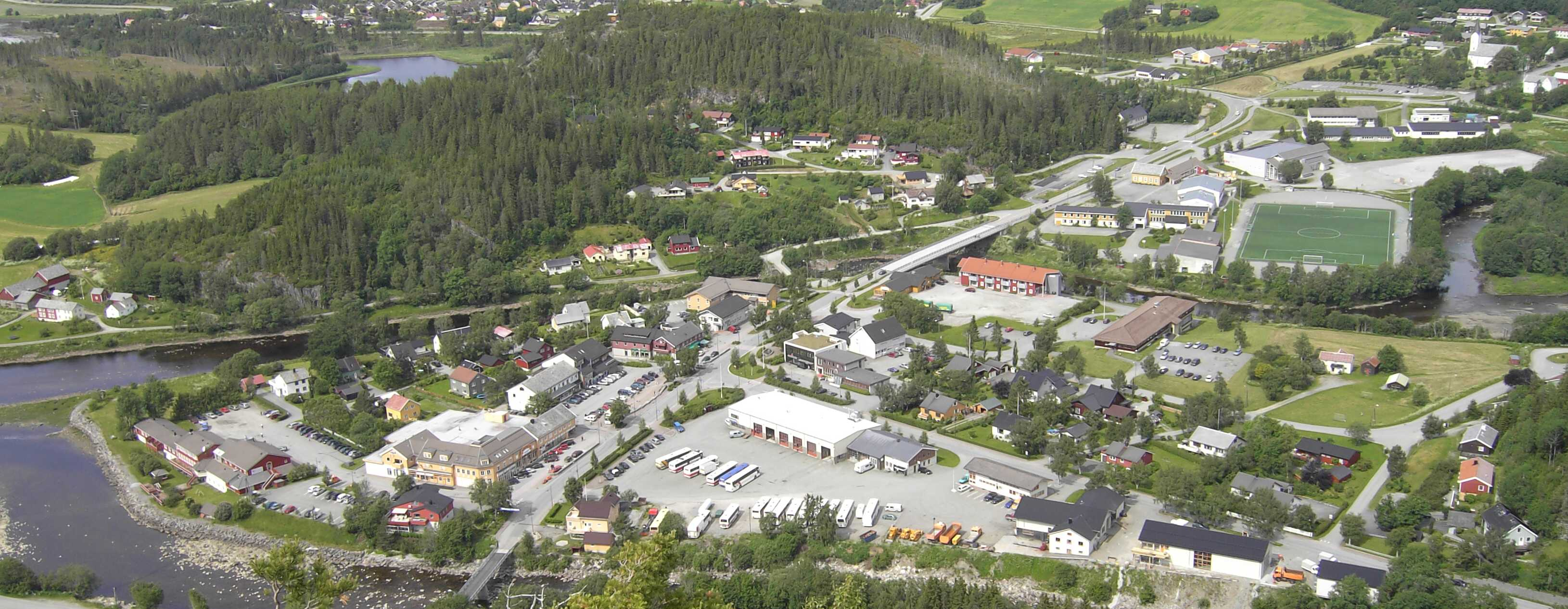
- Interactive map of Åfjord
- Location within Trøndelag Location within Norway
- Coordinates: 63.9607°N 10.2247°E
- Country: Norway
- Region: Central Norway
- County: Trøndelag
- District: Fosen
- Municipality: Åfjord Municipality

Area
  - Total: 1.42 km^{2} (0.55 sq mi)
- Elevation: 9 m (30 ft)

Population (2024)
  - Total: 1,386
  - Density: 976/km^{2} (2,530/sq mi)
- Time zone: UTC+01:00 (CET)
  - Summer (DST): UTC+02:00 (CEST)
- Post Code: 7170 Åfjord

Å (also known as: Åfjord, Årnes, or Å i Åfjord) is the administrative center of Åfjord Municipality in Trøndelag county, Norway. The village is located at the end of the Åfjorden, about 10 kilometres (6.2 mi) west of the village of By. The lake Stordalsvatnet lies just east of the village. Åfjord Church is located in Å, just west of the Nordalselva river.

The 1.42-square-kilometre (350-acre) village has a population (2024) of 1,386 and a population density of 976 inhabitants per square kilometre (2,530/sq mi).

== Name ==
The village is named after the old Aa farm, first referenced in 1329 as "Aom". The name "Aa" (Old Norse: Ár) comes from the plural of á which means "(small) river", probably because two rivers run together beneath the farm. With the Norwegian spelling reforms in the early 20th century, the letter "Aa" was changed to "Å". On 13 July 1934, the name of the municipality was changed from "Å" to "Åfjord". Since then, the administrative centre in the municipality was referred to as "Å i Åfjord". On 1 November 1980, the postal service changed the name from "Å i Åfjord" to "Årnes". Thus, there are several names used for the village: Åfjord, Å, Å i Åfjord, and Årnes.

== See also ==
- List of short place names
