= Stokkøy Bridge =

Stokkøy Bridge Stokkøybrua
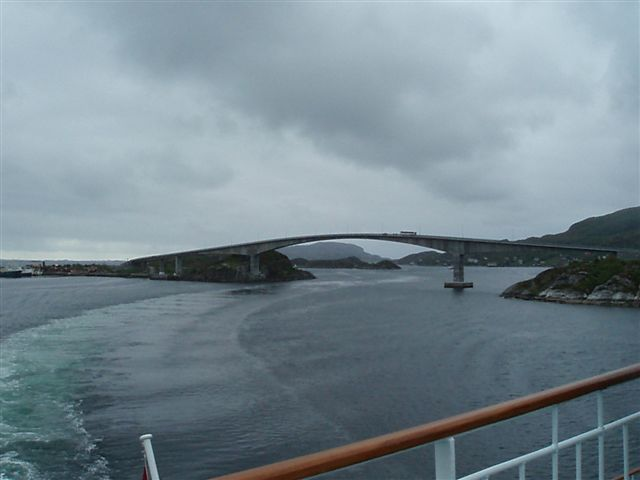
- View of the bridge
- Coordinates: 64°02′50″N 10°02′30″E
- Carries: Fv723
- Crosses: Stokksunet strait
- Locale: Åfjord Municipality, Norway

Characteristics
- Design: Cantilever bridge
- Material: Concrete
- Total length: 525 metres (1,722 ft)
- Longest span: 206 metres (676 ft)
- No. of spans: 6
- Clearance above: 30 metres (98 ft)

History
- Construction start: 1998
- Construction end: 2000
- Construction cost: 120 million kr
- Inaugurated: December 2000

Stokkøy Bridge (Norwegian: Stokkøybrua) is a concrete cantilever bridge that crosses the Stokksundet strait between the mainland and the island of Stokkøya in Åfjord Municipality in Trøndelag county, Norway. The bridge starts near the village of Revsnes on the mainland and goes north to the island of Stokkøya near the village of Harsvika.

The 525-metre-long (1,722 ft) bridge was opened in December 2000. The bridge has six spans, the longest of which is 206 metres (676 ft). The clearance to the sea beneath the bridge is 30 metres (98 ft). The Stokkøy Bridge cost around 120 million kr to build.

== See also ==
- List of bridges in Norway
- List of bridges in Norway by length
- List of bridges
- List of longest bridges in the world
