= Åfjord Municipality =

Municipality in Trøndelag, Norway

Åfjord Municipality Åfjord kommune
- Municipality
- Å herred (historic name); Aa herred (historic name); Aafjorden herred (historic name)
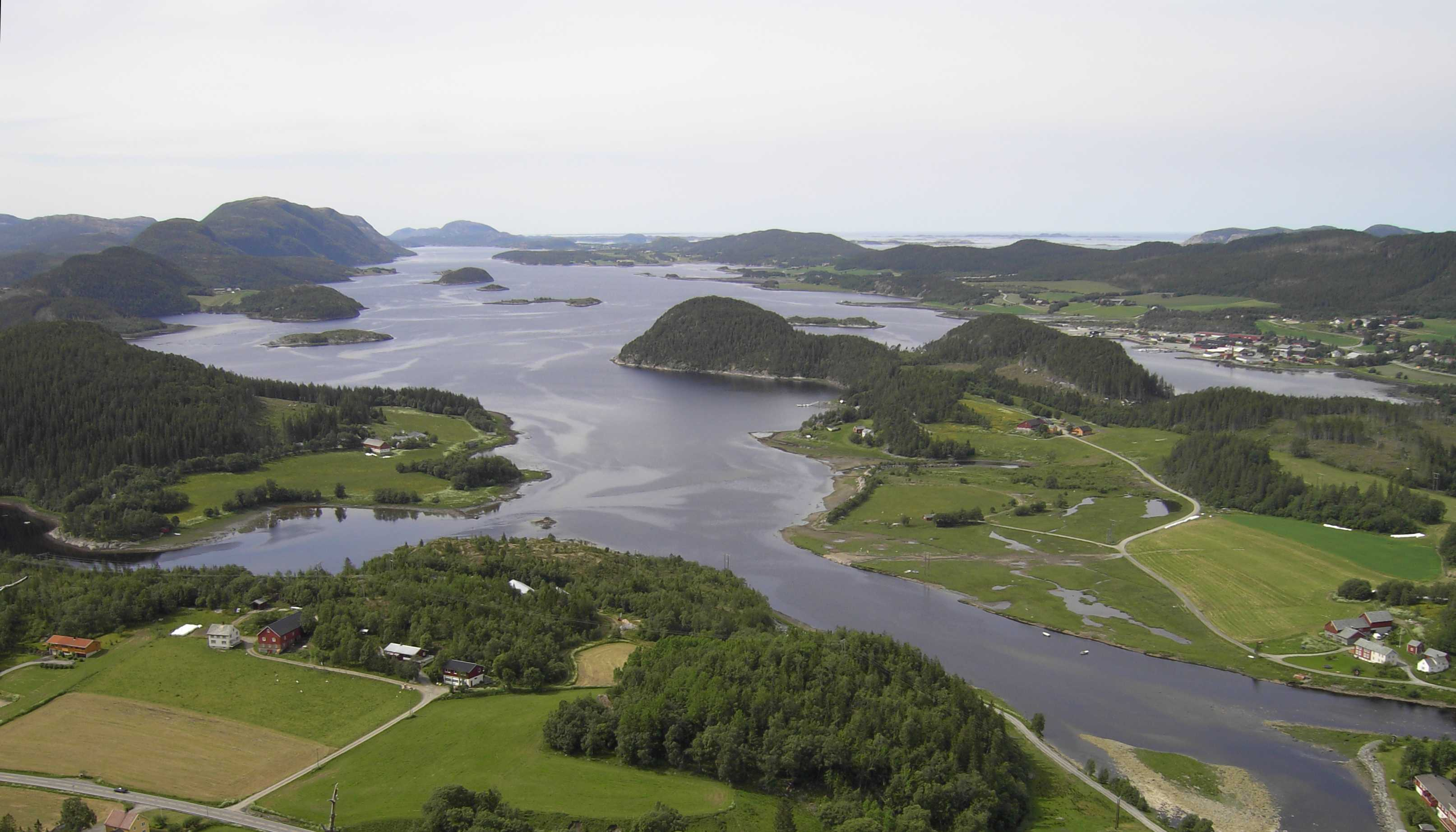
- View of the Åfjorden

- Flag Coat of arms

- Trøndelag within Norway

- Åfjord within Trøndelag
- Coordinates: 63°58′40″N 10°23′08″E
- Country: Norway
- County: Trøndelag
- District: Fosen
- Established: 1 Jan 1838
  - Created as: Formannskapsdistrikt
- Administrative centre: Årnes

Government
  - Mayor (2023): Erling Iversen (Sp)

Area
  - Total: 1,329.43 km^{2} (513.30 sq mi)
  - Land: 1,250.60 km^{2} (482.86 sq mi)
  - Water: 78.83 km^{2} (30.44 sq mi) 5.9%
  - Rank: #74 in Norway
- Highest elevation: 675.05 m (2,214.7 ft)

Population (2024)
  - Total: 4,339
  - Rank: #197 in Norway
  - Density: 3.3/km^{2} (8.5/sq mi)
  - Change (10 years): ▲ +2.6%
- Demonym: Åfjording

Official language
  - Norwegian form: Neutral
- Time zone: UTC+01:00 (CET)
  - Summer (DST): UTC+02:00 (CEST)
- ISO 3166 code: NO-5058
- Website: Official website

Åfjord is a municipality in Trøndelag county, Norway. It is part of the Fosen region. The administrative centre of the municipality is the village of Årnes. Other villages in the municipality include Revsnes, Roan, Bessaker, Harsvika, and By. Åfjord is located on the northwestern side of the Fosen peninsula, northwest of the city of Trondheim.

The 1,329-square-kilometre (513 sq mi) municipality is the 74th largest by area out of the 357 municipalities in Norway. Åfjord Municipality is the 197th most populous municipality in Norway with a population of 4,339. The municipality's population density is 3.3 inhabitants per square kilometre (8.5/sq mi) and its population has increased by 2.6% over the previous 10-year period.

== General information ==
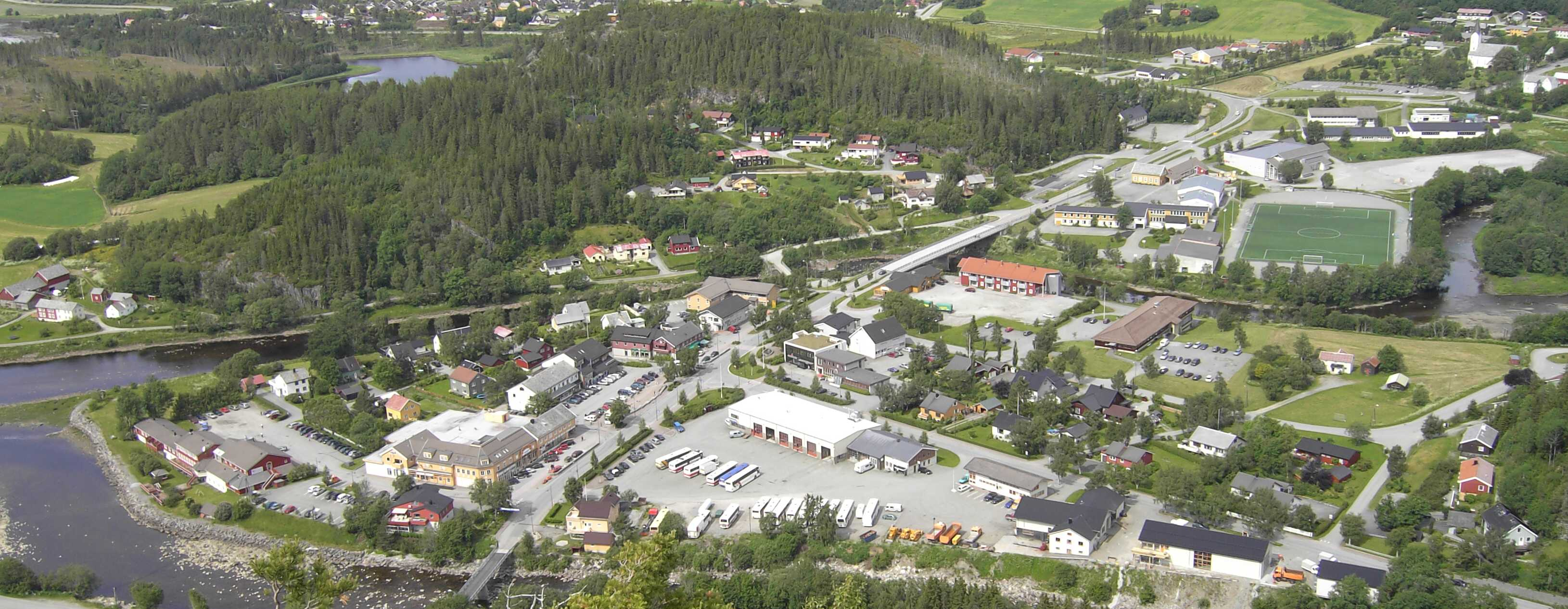
Årnes in Åfjord

The municipality of Aafjord was established on 1 January 1838 (see formannskapsdistrikt law). On 26 March 1870, a royal resolution moved a small, unpopulated part to Aafjord Municipality to the neighboring Bjugn Municipality. On 1 January 1896, the southwestern coastal area of Aafjord Municipality (population: 1,529) was separated to form the new Jøssund Municipality. This left Aafjord Municipality with 2,419 residents. On the same date, the name of Aafjord Municipality was changed to just Aa Municipality. The spelling was later changed to Å Municipality. On 13 July 1934, the name of the municipality was changed from "Å" to "Åfjord Municipality". After that, the administrative centre in the municipality was referred to as "Å" or "Å i Åfjord".

During the 1960s, there were many municipal mergers across Norway due to the work of the Schei Committee. On 1 January 1964, the neighboring Stoksund Municipality (population: 2,643) and Åfjord Municipality (population: 1,515) were merged to form a new, larger Åfjord Municipality. On 1 November 1980, the postal service changed the name of the municipal center from "Å i Åfjord" to "Årnes".

On 1 January 2018, the municipality switched from the old Sør-Trøndelag county to the new Trøndelag county.

On 1 January 2020, the neighboring Roan Municipality was merged into Åfjord Municipality. The new municipality adopted the coat of arms of the old Roan Municipality.

=== Name ===
The municipality (originally the parish) is named after the old Aa farm (Old Norse: Ár) since the first Åfjord Church was built there. The local fjord (Åfjorden) is also named after this farm. The first element of the current name is the plural form of á which means "river", probably since there are two rivers, the Norddalselva and Stordalselva, that run together just south of the farm. The last element of the current name is fjǫrðr which means "fjord".

The spelling of the name has varied over the years. Historically, the name of the municipality was spelled Aafjorden. On 23 March 1895, a royal resolution approved the division of the municipality effective 1 January 1896. On that date, the southwestern part became the new Jøssund Municipality and the remaining portion of Aafjorden Municipality would be renamed Aa (leaving off the "fjord" part of the old name). On 21 December 1917, a royal resolution enacted the 1917 Norwegian language reforms. Prior to this change, the name was spelled Aa with the digraph "Aa", and after this reform, the name was spelled Å, simply using the letter Å instead. On 13 July 1934, a royal resolution changed the spelling of the name of the municipality to Åfjord.

=== Coat of arms ===
Arms of Åfjord (2020–present)

Arms of Åfjord (1997-2019)

The current coat of arms was approved for use starting on 1 January 2020 after a municipal merger with Åfjord Municipality and Roan Municipality. These arms had previously been used by Roan from 1987 until 2020. The official blazon is "Azure, three terns volant argent" (Norwegian: I blått tre oppflyvende sølv terner, 2-1). This means the arms have a blue field (background) and the charge is a group of three flying terns. The bird design has a tincture of argent which means it is commonly colored white, but if it is made out of metal, then silver is used. Terns, a very watchful and energetic bird, are intended to symbolize the local inhabitants and the coast with the vast bird life in the area. The arms were initially designed by Solfrid Krogfjord with the final design by Einar H. Skjervold. The municipal flag has the same design as the coat of arms.

The previous coat of arms was granted on 18 April 1997 until 1 January 2020 when the municipality was enlarged and the arms were changed. The official blazon is "Azure, two boats argent issuant from sinister" (Norwegian: I blått to fremvoksende sølv båter). This means the arms have a blue field (background) and the charge is two boats coming out of the right side of the shield. The boats have a tincture of argent which means they are commonly colored white, but if the arms are made out of metal, then silver is used. The arms show two stems of a boat to represent the special boats Norwegian: Åfjordbåt that are built in the municipality. These boats had a long, shallow keel and straight masts. The arms were designed by Einar H. Skjervold. The municipal flag had the same design as the coat of arms.

=== Churches ===
The Church of Norway has three parishes (sokn) within Åfjord Municipality. It is part of the Fosen prosti (deanery) in the Diocese of Nidaros.

Churches in Åfjord Municipality
Parish (sokn)	Church name	Location of the church	Year built
Åfjord	Åfjord Church	Årnes	1879
Stoksund	Stoksund Church	Revsnes	1825
Roan	Roan Church	Roan	1702

== History ==
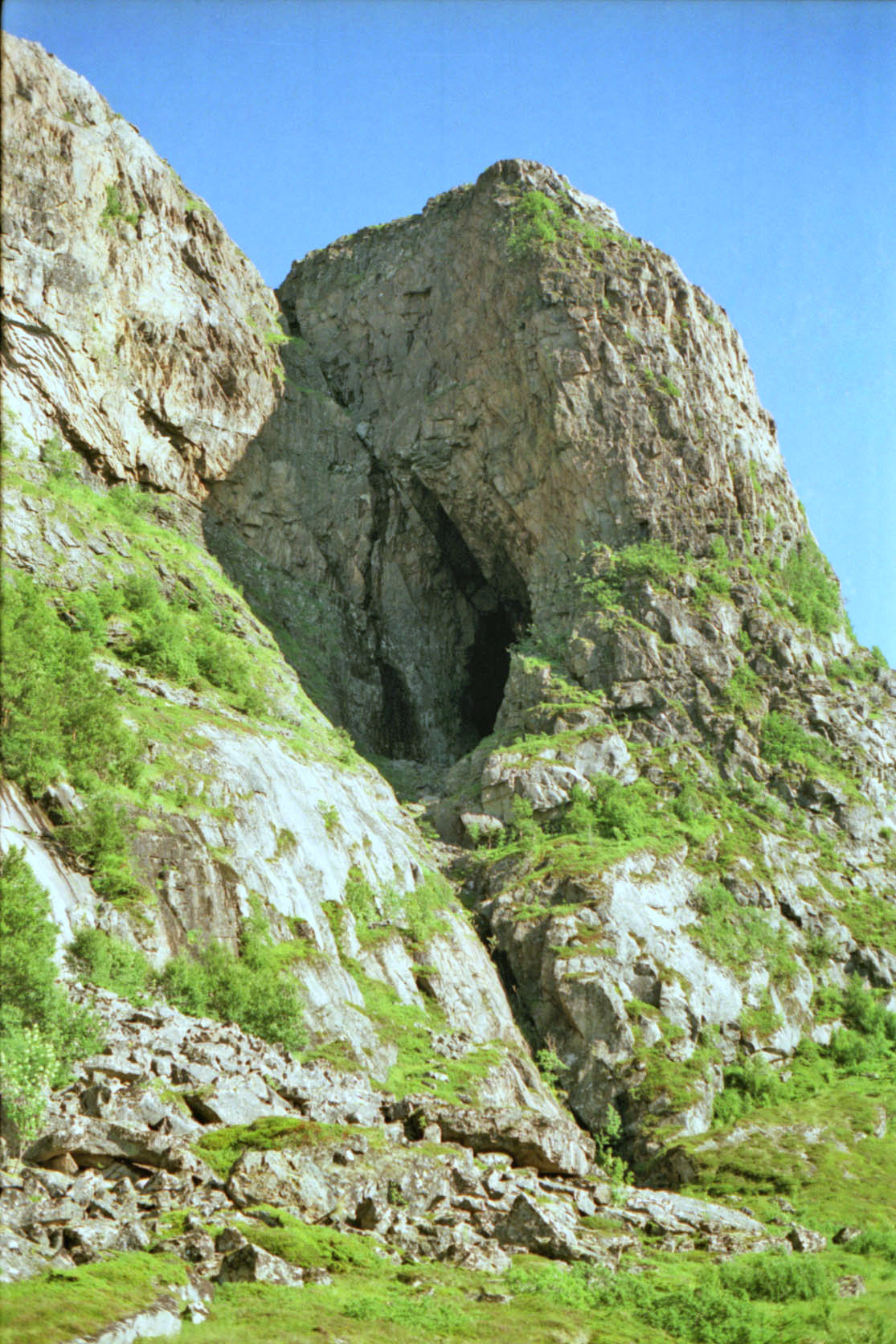
Harbakkhula (cave), with evidence of Stone Age settlement.

There are archeological findings on many sites across the municipality. At Dragseid. archaeologists have located grave mounds. It is said that the wooden boats were dragged over the thin Dragseid peninsula to shorten the journey and to avoid risking them in bad weather. Up to the Middle Ages the Fosen peninsula was included as a part of the district of Nordmøre, immediately to the south.

Prior to 1950, there were no roads leading into and out of the municipality. In 1950, the road to the neighboring Bjugn Municipality to the south was finally finished. In 1955, the road to Stoksund Municipality in the northern part of the municipality was finished.

=== Åfjord boat ===
An old type of wooden boat, the Åfjord boat, comes from this area. The boat is a direct descendant form the old Norse Viking boats. It is still being produced, although in very small numbers. The boat is rounded at both ends. It is known to be a good coastal sailer. Different sizes exist. From the small "faering" to the largest of them all, the "fembøring".

== Government ==
Åfjord Municipality is responsible for primary education (through 10th grade), outpatient health services, senior citizen services, welfare and other social services, zoning, economic development, and municipal roads and utilities. The municipality is governed by a municipal council of directly elected representatives. The mayor is indirectly elected by a vote of the municipal council. The municipality is under the jurisdiction of the Trøndelag District Court and the Frostating Court of Appeal.

Åfjord joined the inter-municipal waste management agency Fosen Renovasjon when it was founded in 1997. Roan had instead chosen to join Midtre Namdal Avfallsselskap in 1995. With the municipal merger, the council decided to go on with Fosen, which became the new waste management agency for the whole municipality.

=== Municipal council ===
The municipal council (Kommunestyre) of Åfjord Municipality is made up of 27 representatives that are elected to four year terms. The tables below show the current and historical composition of the council by political party.

Åfjord kommunestyre 2023–2027
Party name (in Norwegian)	Number of representatives
Labour Party (Arbeiderpartiet)	6
Progress Party (Fremskrittspartiet)	2
Conservative Party (Høyre)	4
Christian Democratic Party (Kristelig Folkeparti)	1
Centre Party (Senterpartiet)	9
Liberal Party (Venstre)	1
Total number of members:	23

Åfjord kommunestyre 2019–2023
Party name (in Norwegian)	Number of representatives
Labour Party (Arbeiderpartiet)	10
Progress Party (Fremskrittspartiet)	2
Conservative Party (Høyre)	4
Christian Democratic Party (Kristelig Folkeparti)	1
Centre Party (Senterpartiet)	9
Liberal Party (Venstre)	1
Total number of members:	27
Note: On 1 January 2020, Roan Municipality became part of Åfjord Municipality.

Åfjord kommunestyre 2015–2019
Party name (in Norwegian)	Number of representatives
Labour Party (Arbeiderpartiet)	8
Progress Party (Fremskrittspartiet)	2
Conservative Party (Høyre)	3
Christian Democratic Party (Kristelig Folkeparti)	2
Centre Party (Senterpartiet)	5
Liberal Party (Venstre)	1
Total number of members:	21

Åfjord kommunestyre 2011–2015
Party name (in Norwegian)	Number of representatives
Labour Party (Arbeiderpartiet)	9
Progress Party (Fremskrittspartiet)	2
Conservative Party (Høyre)	3
Christian Democratic Party (Kristelig Folkeparti)	2
Centre Party (Senterpartiet)	5
Total number of members:	21

Åfjord kommunestyre 2007–2011
Party name (in Norwegian)	Number of representatives
Labour Party (Arbeiderpartiet)	6
Progress Party (Fremskrittspartiet)	2
Conservative Party (Høyre)	2
Christian Democratic Party (Kristelig Folkeparti)	2
Centre Party (Senterpartiet)	7
Socialist Left Party (Sosialistisk Venstreparti)	1
Liberal Party (Venstre)	1
Total number of members:	21

Åfjord kommunestyre 2003–2007
Party name (in Norwegian)	Number of representatives
Labour Party (Arbeiderpartiet)	3
Conservative Party (Høyre)	3
Christian Democratic Party (Kristelig Folkeparti)	3
Centre Party (Senterpartiet)	9
Socialist Left Party (Sosialistisk Venstreparti)	2
Liberal Party (Venstre)	1
Total number of members:	21

Åfjord kommunestyre 1999–2003
Party name (in Norwegian)	Number of representatives
Labour Party (Arbeiderpartiet)	5
Conservative Party (Høyre)	4
Christian Democratic Party (Kristelig Folkeparti)	4
Centre Party (Senterpartiet)	11
Socialist Left Party (Sosialistisk Venstreparti)	2
Liberal Party (Venstre)	1
Total number of members:	27

Åfjord kommunestyre 1995–1999
Party name (in Norwegian)	Number of representatives
Labour Party (Arbeiderpartiet)	5
Conservative Party (Høyre)	6
Christian Democratic Party (Kristelig Folkeparti)	3
Centre Party (Senterpartiet)	11
Socialist Left Party (Sosialistisk Venstreparti)	1
Liberal Party (Venstre)	1
Total number of members:	27

Åfjord kommunestyre 1991–1995
Party name (in Norwegian)	Number of representatives
Labour Party (Arbeiderpartiet)	6
Conservative Party (Høyre)	5
Christian Democratic Party (Kristelig Folkeparti)	4
Centre Party (Senterpartiet)	9
Socialist Left Party (Sosialistisk Venstreparti)	2
Liberal Party (Venstre)	1
Total number of members:	27

Åfjord kommunestyre 1987–1991
Party name (in Norwegian)	Number of representatives
Labour Party (Arbeiderpartiet)	8
Conservative Party (Høyre)	5
Christian Democratic Party (Kristelig Folkeparti)	4
Centre Party (Senterpartiet)	8
Liberal Party (Venstre)	2
Total number of members:	27

Åfjord kommunestyre 1983–1987
Party name (in Norwegian)	Number of representatives
Labour Party (Arbeiderpartiet)	7
Conservative Party (Høyre)	5
Christian Democratic Party (Kristelig Folkeparti)	5
Centre Party (Senterpartiet)	7
Liberal Party (Venstre)	3
Total number of members:	27

Åfjord kommunestyre 1979–1983
Party name (in Norwegian)	Number of representatives
Labour Party (Arbeiderpartiet)	6
Conservative Party (Høyre)	6
Christian Democratic Party (Kristelig Folkeparti)	5
Centre Party (Senterpartiet)	8
Liberal Party (Venstre)	2
Total number of members:	27

Åfjord kommunestyre 1975–1979
Party name (in Norwegian)	Number of representatives
Labour Party (Arbeiderpartiet)	6
Conservative Party (Høyre)	4
Christian Democratic Party (Kristelig Folkeparti)	6
Centre Party (Senterpartiet)	9
Joint list of the Liberal Party (Venstre) and New People's Party (Nye Folkepartiet)	2
Total number of members:	27

Åfjord kommunestyre 1971–1975
Party name (in Norwegian)	Number of representatives
Labour Party (Arbeiderpartiet)	8
Conservative Party (Høyre)	3
Christian Democratic Party (Kristelig Folkeparti)	6
Centre Party (Senterpartiet)	8
Liberal Party (Venstre)	2
Total number of members:	27

Åfjord kommunestyre 1967–1971
Party name (in Norwegian)	Number of representatives
Labour Party (Arbeiderpartiet)	9
Conservative Party (Høyre)	3
Christian Democratic Party (Kristelig Folkeparti)	6
Centre Party (Senterpartiet)	8
Liberal Party (Venstre)	1
Total number of members:	27

Åfjord kommunestyre 1963–1967
Party name (in Norwegian)	Number of representatives
Labour Party (Arbeiderpartiet)	9
Conservative Party (Høyre)	4
Christian Democratic Party (Kristelig Folkeparti)	5
Centre Party (Senterpartiet)	8
Liberal Party (Venstre)	1
Total number of members:	27
Note: On 1 January 1964, Stokksund Municipality became part of Åfjord Municipality.

Åfjord herredsstyre 1959–1963
Party name (in Norwegian)	Number of representatives
Labour Party (Arbeiderpartiet)	4
Conservative Party (Høyre)	2
Christian Democratic Party (Kristelig Folkeparti)	4
Centre Party (Senterpartiet)	6
Liberal Party (Venstre)	1
Total number of members:	17

Åfjord herredsstyre 1955–1959
Party name (in Norwegian)	Number of representatives
Labour Party (Arbeiderpartiet)	5
Conservative Party (Høyre)	2
Christian Democratic Party (Kristelig Folkeparti)	3
Farmers' Party (Bondepartiet)	5
Liberal Party (Venstre)	1
Local List(s) (Lokale lister)	1
Total number of members:	17

Åfjord herredsstyre 1951–1955
Party name (in Norwegian)	Number of representatives
Labour Party (Arbeiderpartiet)	4
Conservative Party (Høyre)	2
Christian Democratic Party (Kristelig Folkeparti)	3
Farmers' Party (Bondepartiet)	6
Liberal Party (Venstre)	1
Total number of members:	16

Åfjord herredsstyre 1947–1951
Party name (in Norwegian)	Number of representatives
Labour Party (Arbeiderpartiet)	4
Christian Democratic Party (Kristelig Folkeparti)	3
Joint List(s) of Non-Socialist Parties (Borgerlige Felleslister)	9
Total number of members:	16

Åfjord herredsstyre 1945–1947
Party name (in Norwegian)	Number of representatives
Labour Party (Arbeiderpartiet)	4
Joint List(s) of Non-Socialist Parties (Borgerlige Felleslister)	11
Local List(s) (Lokale lister)	1
Total number of members:	16

Åfjord herredsstyre 1937–1941*
Party name (in Norwegian)	Number of representatives
Local List(s) (Lokale lister)	16
Total number of members:	16
Note: Due to the German occupation of Norway during World War II, no elections were held for new municipal councils until after the war ended in 1945.

=== Mayors ===
The mayor (Norwegian: ordfører) of Åfjord Municipality is the political leader of the municipality and the chairperson of the municipal council. Here is a list of people who have held this position:

- 1838–1839: Thore Petter Berg
- 1840–1847: Hans Günther Magelsen
- 1848–1851: Thore Petter Berg
- 1852–1853: Christopher Andreas Lassen
- 1854–1857: Thore Petter Berg
- 1858–1859: Christopher Andreas Lassen
- 1860–1867: Ole Berg
- 1868–1871: Bernt Graning
- 1872–1877: Ole Berg
- 1878–1879: Hans P. Dahl (V)
- 1880–1885: Nils Berg
- 1886–1890: Karl Seip (V)
- 1890–1898: Hans P. Dahl (V)
- 1899–1907: Ove Selnes (V)
- 1908–1919: Ole Berdahl (V)
- 1920–1928: Kristian Karlsaune (V)
- 1929–1931: Johannes Bye (H)
- 1932–1937: Ole O. Stjern (Bp)
- 1938–1942: Einar Nordtømme (Bp)
- 1942–1945: Magne Nilsen (NS)
- 1945–1946: Einar Nordtømme (Bp)
- 1947–1955: Petter M. Stavrum (Bp)
- 1955-1955: Toralf Gilde (Sp)
- 1956–1965: Einar Hole Moxnes (Sp)
- 1966–1967: Erling Stjern (KrF)
- 1968–1971: John Skaseth (Sp)
- 1972–1975: Erling Stjern (KrF)
- 1976–1989: Einar Aune (Sp)
- 1990–1995: Michael Momyr (H)
- 1995–1998: Kristian Flenstad (Sp)
- 1998–1999: Vidar Daltveit (KrF)
- 1999–2007: Oddbjørn Rømma (Sp)
- 2007–2023: Vibeke Stjern (Ap)
- 2023–present: Erling Iversen (Sp)

== Economy ==
The people of Åfjord make their living from agriculture, forestry, fishing, transport (sea and land), aquaculture (fish and shellfish), construction, and services. The largest employer in the area is Stjern (forestry, sawmill, entrepreneur). The contractor, building, sector now employs about 19% of the working force, and is now larger than the agricultural sector.

== Geography ==
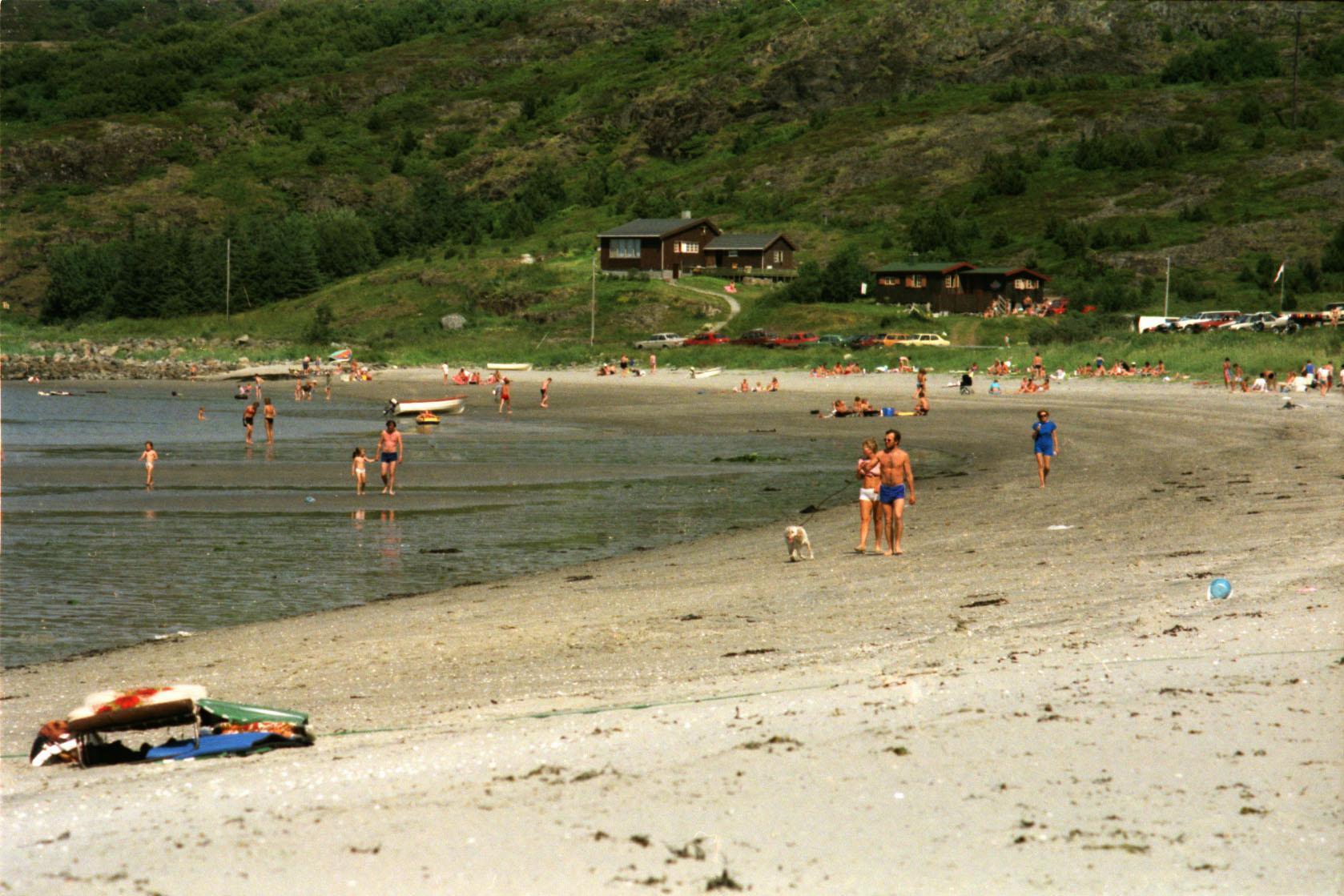
Hosensanden beach on the island Stokkøya, July 1987

Åfjord Municipality is located next to Osen Municipality to the north, Namsos Municipality to the northeast, Steinkjer Municipality to the east, Indre Fosen Municipality to the south, and Ørland Municipality to the southwest.

The major centre of the municipality is Årnes (also called "Å in Åfjord"). All major services of the municipality are located there. Other populated areas are Monstad/Å, a couple of minutes by car from Årnes, and Stoksund/Revsnes. Åfjord covers an area of approximately 1,300 square kilometres (500 sq mi), with about 4300 residents— about one third of which live in the Årnes urban area.

Åfjord consists of many small settlements—from the islands in the west to the highlands in the east. Traditionally, Åfjord has been an agricultural society, while Stoksund in the west has had a more of a fishing-based economy. There is an increasing amount of weekend houses and recreational cabins in the area. Åfjord has two big islands; Stokkøya (380 inhabitants) and Linesøya (80 inhabitants). Stokkøya is connected with the mainland through a bridge Stokkøy Bridge. The Linesøy Bridge connects the islands of Stokkøya and Linesøya. The other main island is Lauvøya near the south at the end of the Åfjorden.

The highest point in Åfjord Municipality is the 676-metre (2,218 ft) tall Finnvollheia. There are over 1,000 lakes with fish. Åfjord also has two major salmon rivers—the Nordalselva and Stordalselva, which flow into Åfjorden. English Lords used to fish here in the late 19th century. The lake Stordalsvatnet lies just east of Årnes. The lake Selavatnet lies in the east, along the border with Steinkjer Municipality.

== Notable people ==
- Johan Strand Johansen (1903 in Åfjord - 1970 in Moscow), a politician who had a role in the Furubotn purge
- Einar Hole Moxnes (1921–2006), a Norwegian politician and Mayor of Åfjord from 1955 to 1966
- Hans B. Skaset (born 1935), a Norwegian civil servant and sports official
- Michael Momyr (born 1956), a Norwegian politician and Mayor of Åfjord from 1990 to 1995
- Alexander Lund Hansen (born 1982 in Åfjord), a Norwegian former football goalkeeper
