= Åfjorden =

Fjord in Trøndelag, Norway

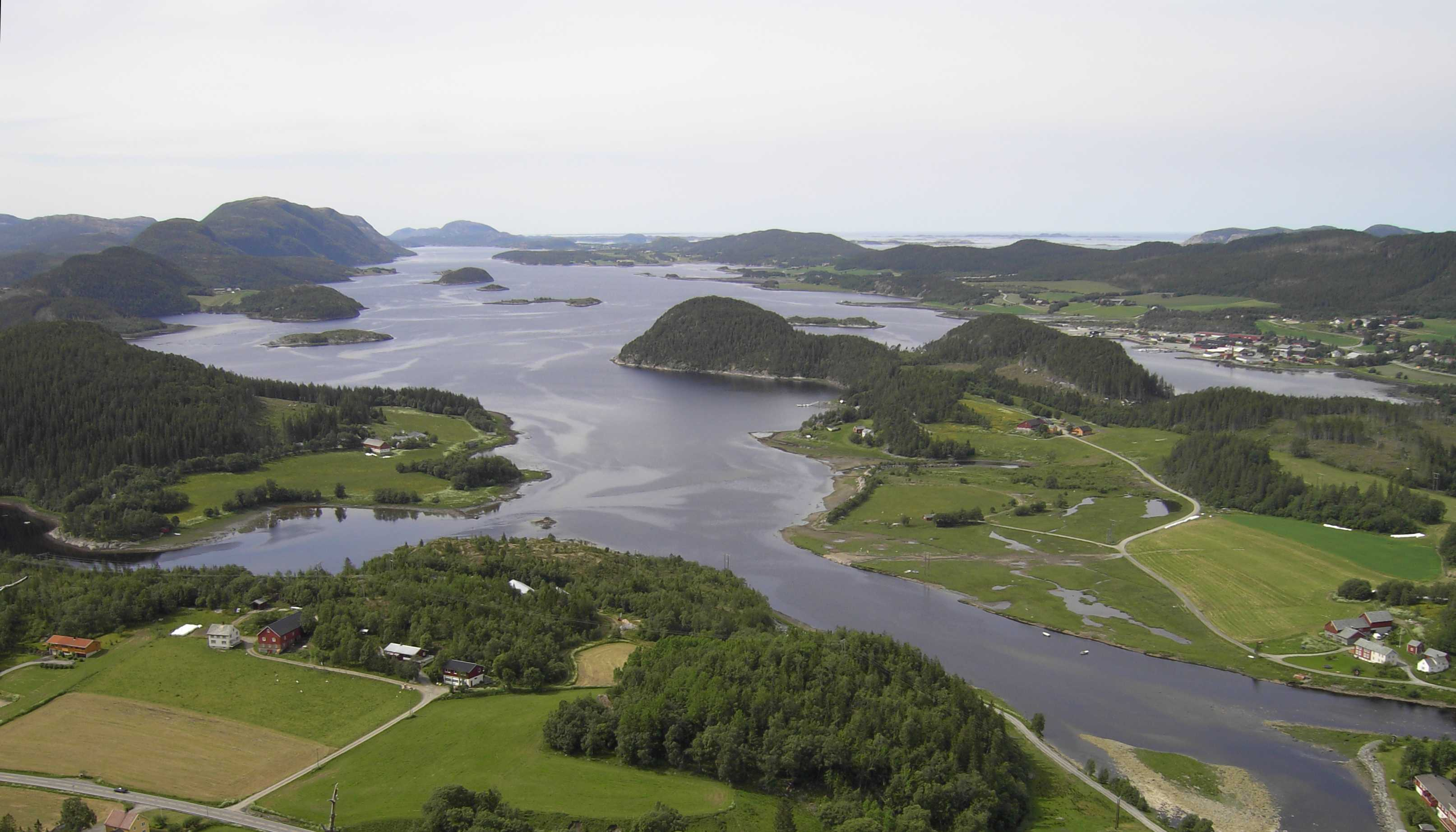
- Aafjorden as viewed from Maelanakken, Norway

- Location within Norway Location within Trøndelag
- Interactive map of the fjord
- Location: Trøndelag County, Norway
- Coordinates: 63.9190°N 10.0739°E
- Type: Fjord
- Primary outflows: Lauvøyfjorden
- Basin countries: Norway
- Max. length: 15 km (9.3 mi)
- Settlements: Årnes

The Åfjorden is a fjord in Åfjord Municipality in Trøndelag county, Norway. The 15-kilometre (9.3 mi) Åfjorden flows into the Lauvøyfjorden between the village of Lysøysundet and the island of Lauvøya, and then it flows out into the ocean. The municipal center of Åfjord, Årnes, lies at the head of the fjord.
