= Bjørnør Municipality =

Former municipality in Trøndelag, Norway

Bjørnør Municipality Bjørnør herred
- Former municipality
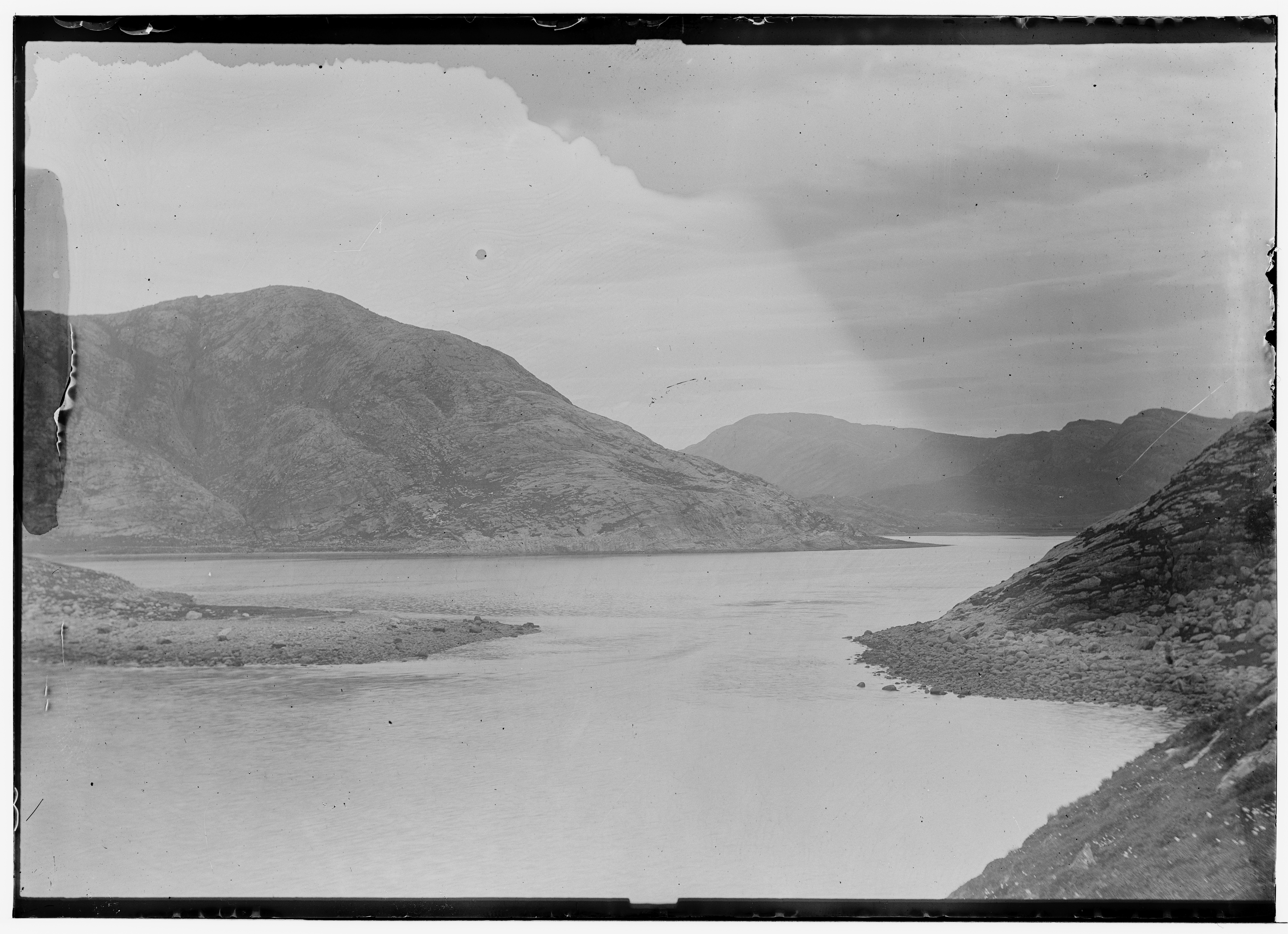
- View of the Osenstrømmen

- Sør-Trøndelag within Norway

- Bjørnør within Sør-Trøndelag
- Coordinates: 64°10′21″N 10°32′15″E
- Country: Norway
- County: Sør-Trøndelag
- District: Fosen
- Established: 1 Jan 1838
  - Created as: Formannskapsdistrikt
- Disestablished: 1 June 1892
  - Succeeded by: Roan Municipality, Stoksund Municipality, Osen Municipality
- Administrative centre: Roan

Government
  - Mayor (1892-1892): John Hopstad (MV)

Area (upon dissolution)
  - Total: 865 km^{2} (334 sq mi)
- Highest elevation: 644.3 m (2,114 ft)

Population (1892)
  - Total: 4,766
  - Density: 5.51/km^{2} (14.3/sq mi)
- Demonym: Bjørnørfolk
- Time zone: UTC+01:00 (CET)
  - Summer (DST): UTC+02:00 (CEST)
- ISO 3166 code: NO-1632

Bjørnør is a former municipality in the old Sør-Trøndelag county in Norway. The 865-square-kilometre (334 sq mi) municipality existed from 1838 until 1892 in what was at that time the United Kingdoms of Sweden and Norway. It encompassed the area of what is now Osen Municipality and part of Åfjord Municipality, much of the western part of the Fosen peninsula in Trøndelag county. The administrative centre of the municipality was the village of Roan where Roan Church is located.

Bjørnør Municipality bordered Aafjord Municipality to the south and Nordre Trondhjem county to the north and west. Prior to its dissolution in 1892, the 865-square-kilometre (334 sq mi) municipality had a population of about 4,766.

== General information ==
The municipality of Bjørnør was established on 1 January 1838 (see formannskapsdistrikt law). On 15 January 1892, the King approved a royal resolution to split up Bjørør Municipality. The law went into effect on 1 June 1892 when Bjørnør Municipality ceased to exist. On that day it was divided into three parts: Osen Municipality (population: 1,575) in the north, Roan Municipality (population: 2,069) in the centre, and Stoksund Municipality (population: 1,122) in the south.

=== Name ===
The municipality (originally the parish) is named Bjørnør after the historic name for the area (Old Norse: Bjarnaurar). The first element plural genitive case of the word bjǫrn which means "bear". The last element is aurr which means "gravel" or "coarse sand".

=== Churches ===
The Church of Norway had one parish (sokn) within Bjørnør Municipality. At the time of the municipal dissolution, it was part of the Bjørnør prestegjeld and the Fosen prosti (deanery) in the Diocese of Nidaros.

Churches in Bjørnør Municipality
Parish (sokn)	Church name	Location of the church	Year built
Osen	Osen Church	Steinsdalen	1877
Roan	Roan Church	Roan	1702
Stoksund	Stoksund Church	Revsnes	1825

== Geography ==
The highest point in the municipality was the 644.3-metre (2,114 ft) tall mountain Dåapma a tripoint border point between Bjørnør Municipality, Aafjord Municipality, and Beitstaden Municipality.

== Government ==
While it existed, Bjørnør Municipality was governed by a municipal council of directly elected representatives. The mayor was indirectly elected by a vote of the municipal council. The municipality was under the jurisdiction of the Frostating Court of Appeal.

=== Mayors ===
The mayor (Norwegian: ordfører) of Bjørnør Municipality was the political leader of the municipality and the chairperson of the municipal council. Here is a list of people who held this position:

- 1838–1839: Tarald Eide
- 1840–1841: Mathias Eide
- 1842–1845: Christian Severin Houge
- 1846–1851: Mathias Eide
- 1852–1864: Peder Pedersen
- 1864–1865: Ole Wilmann
- 1866–1883: Fredrik Berg (H)
- 1883–1883: Jakob Kristian Sørmelan (V)
- 1884–1885: Johan Moses Møller (H)
- 1886–1888: Harald Kjeldsberg
- 1888–1889: Jens Larsen Hopstad
- 1890–1891: Johan Moses Møller (H)
- 1892–1892: John Hopstad (MV)

== See also ==
- List of former municipalities of Norway
