= Osen =

Osen may refer to:

== People ==
- Erwin Dom Osen (1891–1970), Austrian mime artist
- Otto Osen (1882–1950), Norwegian long-distance runner

== Places ==
=== Bulgaria ===
- Osen, Silistra Province, a village in the Glavinitsa municipality, Silistra Province
- Osen, Targovishte Province, a village in the Targovishte municipality, Targovishte Province
- Osen, Vratsa Province, a village in the Krivodol municipality, Vratsa Province

=== Netherlands ===
- Osen, Netherlands, a village in the province of Limburg

=== Norway ===
- Osen Municipality, a municipality in Trøndelag county
- Osen (village), a village within Osen Municipality in Trøndelag county
- Osen Church, a church in Osen Municipality in Trøndelag county
- Nordre Osen, a village in Åmot Municipality in Innlandet

=== Russia ===
- Osen (river), a tributary of the Mologa

== Other ==
- OSEN (newspaper), a South Korean online newspaper

== See also ==
- Osan, a city in Gyeonggi Province in South Korea
