= Skjervøya (Trøndelag) =

Islands in Trøndelag, Norway

- Interactive map of Skjervøya

Geography
- Location: Trøndelag, Norway
- Coordinates: 64.293°N 10.291°E

Administration
- Norway
- County: Trøndelag
- Municipality: Osen Municipality

Skjervøya are two connected islands in Osen Municipality in Trøndelag county, Norway. It consists of the islands of Ytre Skjervøya and Indre Skjervøya, which are connected by a 170-metre (560 ft) long stone causeway. There are about 20 people living on the islands. The islands lie about 5 kilometres (3.1 mi) north of the village of Bessaker in Roan Municipality and about 10 kilometres (6.2 mi) west of the village of Osen.

== See also ==
- List of islands of Norway
