= Julie Næss =

Norwegian human rights activist (1896–1973)

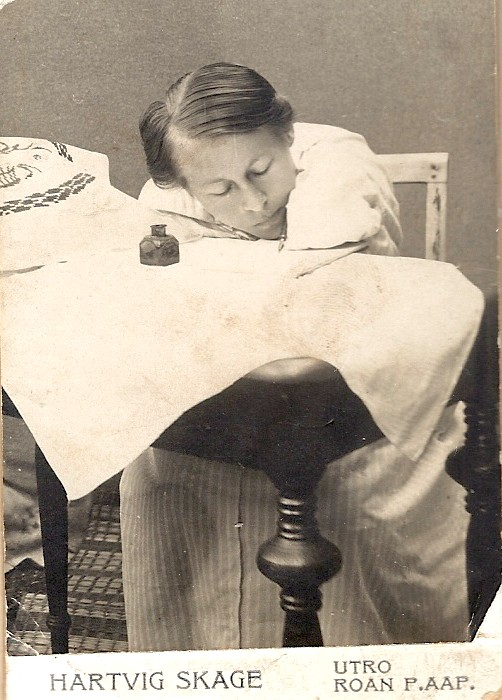
- Næss writing in 1920
- Born: 25 January 1896; Steinsdalen, Norway
- Died: 11 August 1973 (aged 77); Trondheim, Norway
- Burial place: Roan Church, Roan, Norway
- Occupation: Disability rights activist
- Years active: 1922–1973
- Organization: Trøndelag Vanførelag
- Honours: King's Medal of Merit (1946)

Julie Ivarna Næss (25 January 1896 – 11 August 1973) was a Norwegian human rights activist and embroiderer, known for her advocacy for disabled people. Born without arms, she was the founder of the Trøndelag Vanførelag (now part of the Norwegian Association of the Disabled), leading it for many years. Næss visited almost every municipality in Norway in order to support the establishment of local associations for disabled people, in addition to her own home county of Trøndelag. In 1946, she was awarded the silver King's Medal of Merit for her activism.

== Early life and education ==
Næss was born on 25 January 1896 in Steinsdalen, a village in Osen Municipality in central Norway. In church records following her birth, she is identified as "uægte" (lit. 'illegitimate') due to her parents not being married. Her parents were Inga Kristina Olsdatter and Andreas Nilsen. Julie's surname, Næss, came from Jämtland in Sweden, where her maternal grandmother had lived and had been married to a man named Näss, before moving to Steinsdalen in 1864.

Næss was born with severe disabilities, including having no arms, instead having short stumps extending from her shoulders. Her spine was also curved, causing kyphosis, and her hips were crooked. Her parents did not expect her to survive, and so they arranged a home baptism for three days after her birth. However, Næss surpassed expectations, and was eventually baptised in a church on 8 March 1896.

The year after Næss' birth, her father had a child with another woman, and subsequently married her and moved with them to the United States. When she was eight, her mother married Nils Hansen Beskeland, and Næss and her mother moved into Beskeland's home in Roan. In the 1910 Norwegian census, Næss is listed as "Julie Andreasdatter", with her family status as "steddatter" (lit. 'stepdaughter') and her occupation as "vanfør" (lit. 'disabled'). While many children with severe disabled were kept away from Norwegian society, Inga did not want this for her daughter, and enrolled Næss at a regular folkeskole. At the age of 15, Næss won a writing competition run by Morstensens, a publishing house in Oslo.

Næss' mother and her husband had four children together. In 1914, Inga died of pulmonary tuberculosis. When Næss finished school, she wanted to continue her learning and develop her independence skills. The Osen Municipality granted her a place at Sophies Minde Ortopedi, a vocational school for disabled children in Oslo. Næss successfully requested for Haakon VII to approve travel costs to transport Næss and her stepfather from Roan to Oslo in 1914. During the two years she spent at the school, Næss studied embroidery and tailoring; while she had wanted to learn more theoretical subjects, such classes were not offered at the school.

Some time later, Beskeland remarried and moved to the United States with his wife and children, leaving Næss behind.

== Adulthood ==
After completing her studies at Sophies Minde Ortopedi, Næss returned to Roan; following the emigration of her stepfather and half-siblings, she had no family to stay with, and so lived with various "strangers" living in Roan. Næss found it difficult to make a living from sewing, and was unable to find a local room from which she could teach sewing. She made her living at this time primarily by sewing silk embroideries. Næss also worked as a teacher at Roan's primary school between 1920 and 1921.

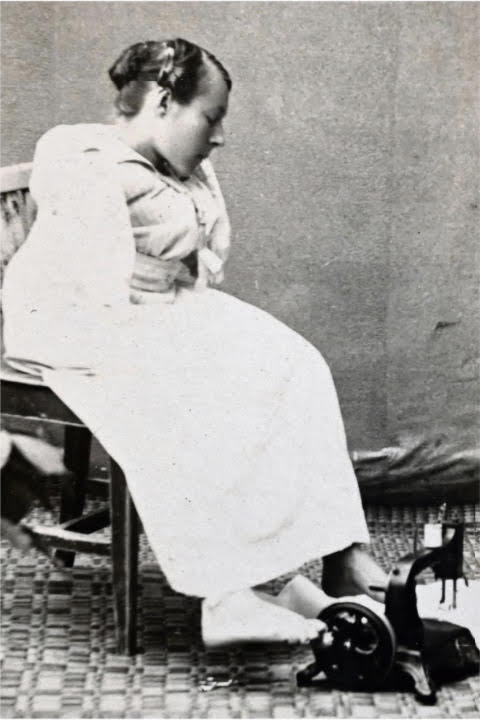
Næss using a sewing machine with her feet (1920)

Næss needed to wear a stiff corset in order to keep upright. As an adult, it was identified that one of her hips was dislocated, but it was felt it was too late to treat.

== Career ==
Næss, who enjoyed writing and maths, wanted to study business so that she could apply for local administrative jobs. She took several courses through the Norsk Korrespondenceskole, and received a diploma for "vel utførte skriftlige arbeider" (lit. 'well-executed written work'); the Korrespondenceskole was not aware of Næss' disability. Næss wrote by holding a pen between her left shoulder and cheek.

In 1921, Næss successfully received a job as a business manager for the Roan branch of the Kretssykasse (lit. 'District Health Insurance Fund'); later that year, she was also employed as a supervisor for the National Insurance Service. She held the positions until 1948, when her increasing activism for disabled people prevented her from continuing on in the roles. As her work increased, Næss began using a typewriter, which she used by placing it on the floor and typing on it using a sticks held between her toes, likening her use of two sticks to able-bodied people using two fingers to type.

== Activism ==
=== 1922–1926: Trøndelag Association for the Disabled ===
Around 1920, Næss began writing newspaper articles about the experiences of disabled people. Ellen Lie, a journalist for Dagsposten, took an interest in Næss' writing, and arranged for a regular column about disabled people to be published in the newspaper in 1923. That same year, Næss was elected to serve on Roan's disability committee.

In 1922, the Trøndelag Association for the Disabled (Norwegian: Trøndelagens forening for vanføres vel), with Næss elected as a deputy representative on the organisation's board. The aim of the association was "to help cripples and assist them in their efforts to become self-reliant people as far as possible by letting them be taught"; the term vanfør, while considered outdated in contemporary Norwegian, was the common term used to refer to disabled people in the early 20th century. The Trøndelag Association for the Disabled provided medical care, medicine, artificial limbs, bandages, specialist equipment to support them to access services such as education.

=== 1926–1952: Trøndelag Vanførelag ===
During a disability convention held in Trondheim in 1926, Næss founded the Trøndelag Vanførelag, and served as its chairperson for the next 26 years. The organisation's original aims was "to gather everyone interested in the cause in Trøndelag - both disabled and non-disabled - for organised and purposeful work, to help and support the disabled's self-help struggle". The establishment of Trøndelag Vanførelag led to some debate at the time as to whether its presence made redundant the existence of the Trøndelag Association for the Disabled; ultimately, it was deemed it was appropriate for disabled peoeple to have their own specific organisation (Trøndelag Vanførelag), and the two organisations cooperated to support disabled people in Trøndelag.

In the mid-1930s, Næss built her own home in Roan, which served as the headquarters of the social security office and the district office for the Vanførelag. Julie also helped raise her cousin's daughter, who later went on to act as an assistant to Næss as she travelled around different municipalities to establish local disability associations. Næss' home became known as "Juliestua" (lit. 'Julie's House'). During the decade, Næss visited almost every municipality in Norway; a devout Christian, she always started her meetings and talks with the song "Kjærlighet fra Gud" (lit. 'Love from God').

== Later life and death ==
Næss had stopped serving as the chairperson of the Vanførelag by 1952, but continued to be active in local disability activism. She spent many years supporting the establishment of a care home for disabled people in Trondheim, and in 1960 opened the Trøndelag Vanførehjem in Munkvoll farm in Trondheim. In 1965, Næss established Roans Vanføre, a foundation for disabled people in Roan, donating 100, 000 NOK to the fund.

Næss moved to live in the Trøndelag Vanførehjem in 1967, where she remained until her death in 1973. She was buried at Roan Church. Her sole heir was the Trøndelag Vanførelag, which established the Julie Næss Memorial Fund using proceeds from the sale of Munkvoll farm to Trøndelag County Council.

== Recognition ==
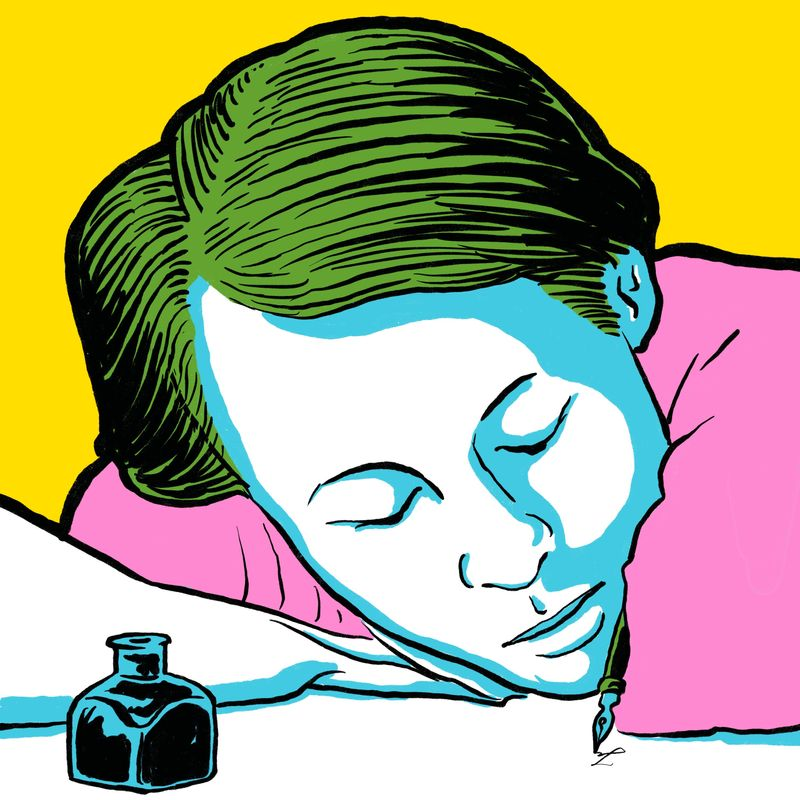
Portrait of Næss as part of the Feministhuset i Trondheim's "Wall of Feminism" exhibition (2021)

In 1946, Næss received the silver King's Medal of Merit.

In 1984, the Trøndelag Vanføreheim was renamed to Munkvoll Farm (Norwegian: Munkvoll gård); to commemorate the change, a bronze relief of Næss, designed by Kristofer Leirdal, was gifted to the farm by the Norwegian Association of the Disabled; it returned to the association after the farm was demolished. In 2017, the relief was given to the municipality of Roan to commemorate its 125th anniversary after the mayor of Roan, Einar Eian, named Næss as the individual he felt should be commemorated in the municipality. A street in Roan is also named after her.

In 2018, Torvald Sund published the play Eg vil skapa min himmel på jord (lit. 'I Want to Create My Heaven on Earth'), based on Næss' life. It premiered at the Utrotunet in Roan on 20 July 2018.

In 2021, a nursing home that opened in Roan was named Julie Næss-tunet in her honour. The bronze relief of Næss was also moved into the building. That same year, a portrait of Næss was included at the Feministhuset i Trondheim's "Wall of Feminism" exhibition.
