= Roan Municipality =

Former municipality in Sør-Trøndelag, Norway

Roan Municipality Roan kommune
- Former municipality
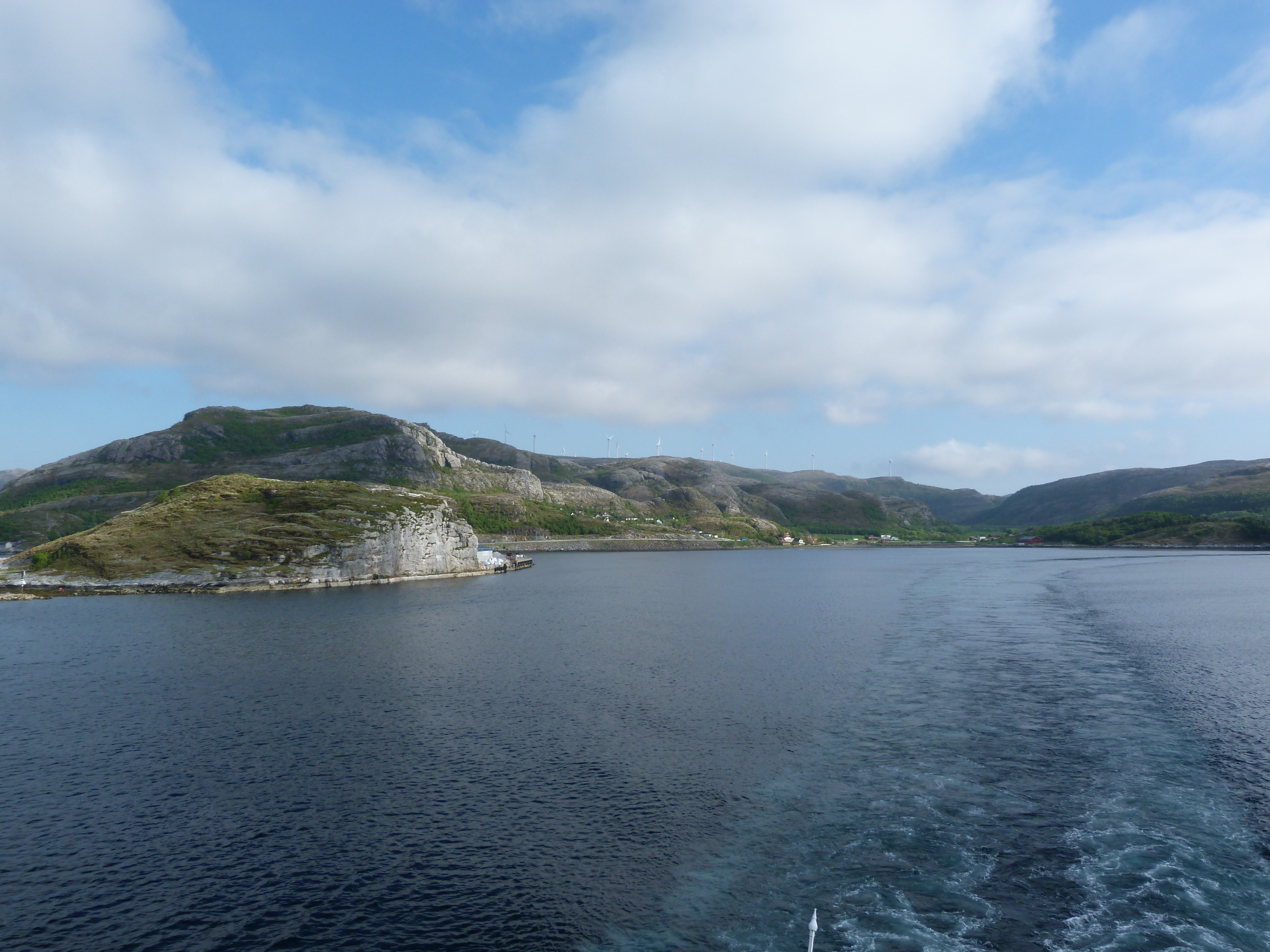
- View of Bessaker in Roan

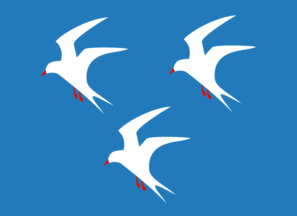
- Flag Coat of arms

- Trøndelag within Norway

- Roan within Trøndelag
- Coordinates: 64°09′01″N 10°18′09″E
- Country: Norway
- County: Trøndelag
- District: Fosen
- Established: 1 June 1892
  - Preceded by: Bjørnør Municipality
- Disestablished: 1 Jan 2020
  - Succeeded by: Åfjord Municipality
- Administrative centre: Roan

Government
  - Mayor (2015-2019): Einar Eian (H)

Area (upon dissolution)
  - Total: 374.71 km^{2} (144.68 sq mi)
  - Land: 355.24 km^{2} (137.16 sq mi)
  - Water: 19.47 km^{2} (7.52 sq mi) 5.2%
  - Rank: #248 in Norway
- Highest elevation: 644.3 m (2,114 ft)

Population (2019)
  - Total: 957
  - Rank: #396 in Norway
  - Density: 2.6/km^{2} (6.7/sq mi)
  - Change (10 years): ▼ −5.2%

Official language
  - Norwegian form: Neutral
- Time zone: UTC+01:00 (CET)
  - Summer (DST): UTC+02:00 (CEST)
- ISO 3166 code: NO-5019

Roan is a former municipality in Trøndelag county, Norway. The municipality existed from 1892 until its dissolution in 2020 when it joined Åfjord Municipality. It was part of the Fosen region along the coast. The administrative centre of the municipality was the village of Roan. Other villages included Bessaker, Brandsfjord, and Hofstad.

At the time of its dissolution in 2020, the 375-square-kilometre (145 sq mi) municipality was the 248th largest by area out of the 422 municipalities in Norway. Roan Municipality was the 396th most populous municipality in Norway with a population of 957. The municipality's population density was 2.6 inhabitants per square kilometre (6.7/sq mi) and its population had decreased by 5.2% over the last decade.

A large wind park is located on the mountain plateau just southeast of Bessaker.

== General information ==
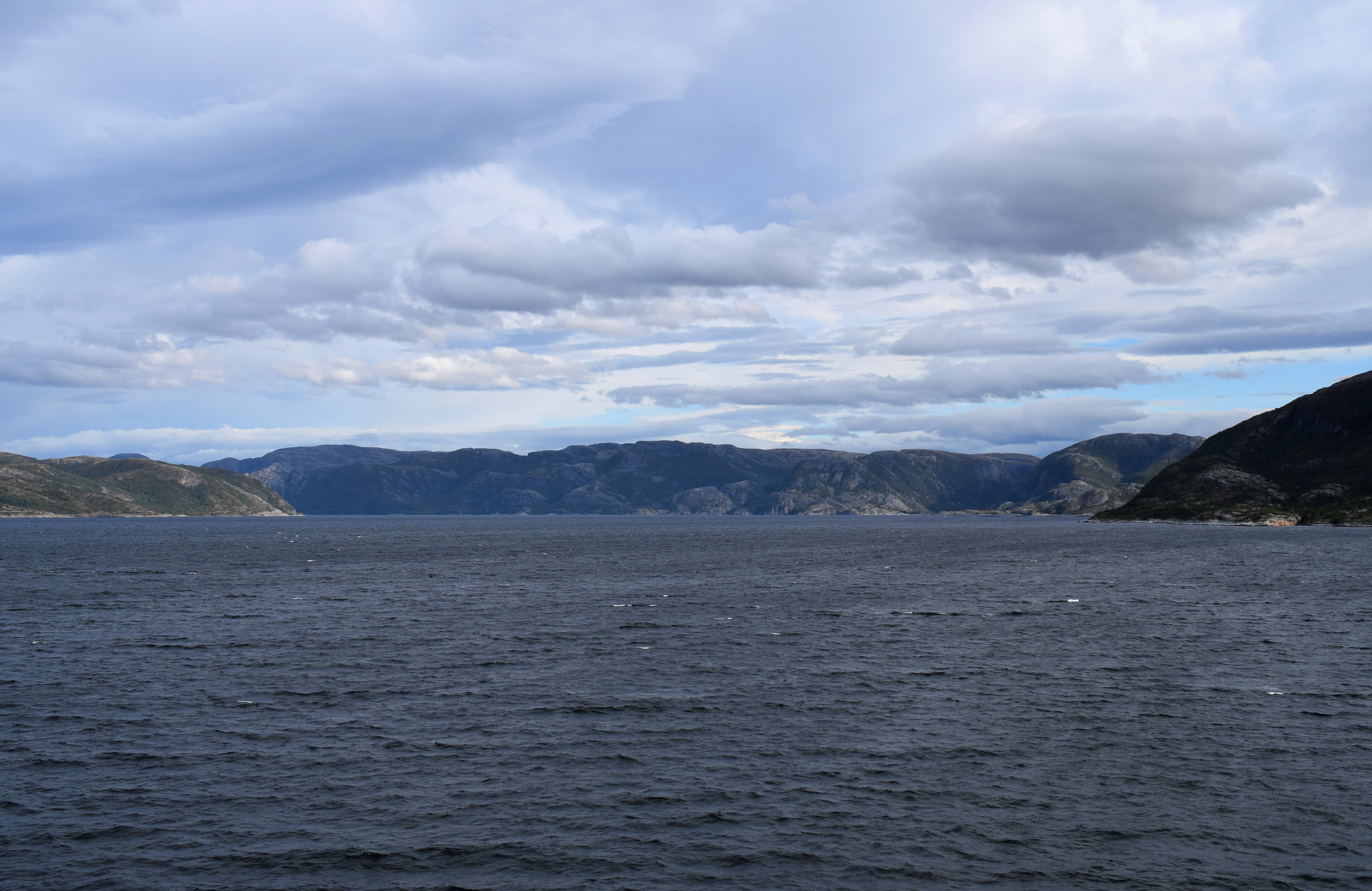
View of the Skjørafjorden along the Roan coast

The municipality of Roan was established on 1 June 1892 when the old Bjørnør Municipality was divided into three parts: Roan Municipality (population: 2,069) in the centre, Osen Municipality (population: 1,575) in the north, and Stoksund Municipality (population: 1,122) in the south.

On 1 January 2018, the municipality switched from the old Sør-Trøndelag county to the new Trøndelag county. On 1 January 2020, Roan Municipality was merged into the neighboring Åfjord Municipality.

=== Name ===
The municipality (originally the parish) is named after the old Roan farm since the first Roan Church was built there. The name is probably derived from the Old Norse word róða which means "pole" a reference to a mountain peak behind the farm.

=== Coat of arms ===
The coat of arms was granted on 22 May 1987 and it was in use until 1 January 2020 when the municipality was dissolved. The official blazon is "Azure, three terns volant argent" (Norwegian: I blått tre oppflyvende sølv terner, 2-1). This means the arms have a blue field (background) and the charge is a group of three flying terns. The bird design has a tincture of argent which means it is commonly colored white, but if it is made out of metal, then silver is used. Terns, a very watchful and energetic bird, are intended to symbolize the local inhabitants and the coast with the vast bird life in the area. The arms were initially designed by Solfrid Krogfjord with the final design by Einar H. Skjervold. The municipal flag has the same design as the coat of arms. After the municipal merger on 1 January 2020, these arms were adopted as the arms for the new Åfjord Municipality.

=== Churches ===
The Church of Norway had one parish (sokn) within Roan Municipality. It is part of the Fosen prosti (deanery) in the Diocese of Nidaros.

Churches in Roan Municipality
Parish (sokn)	Church name	Location of the church	Year built
Roan	Roan Church	Roan	1702

== Geography ==
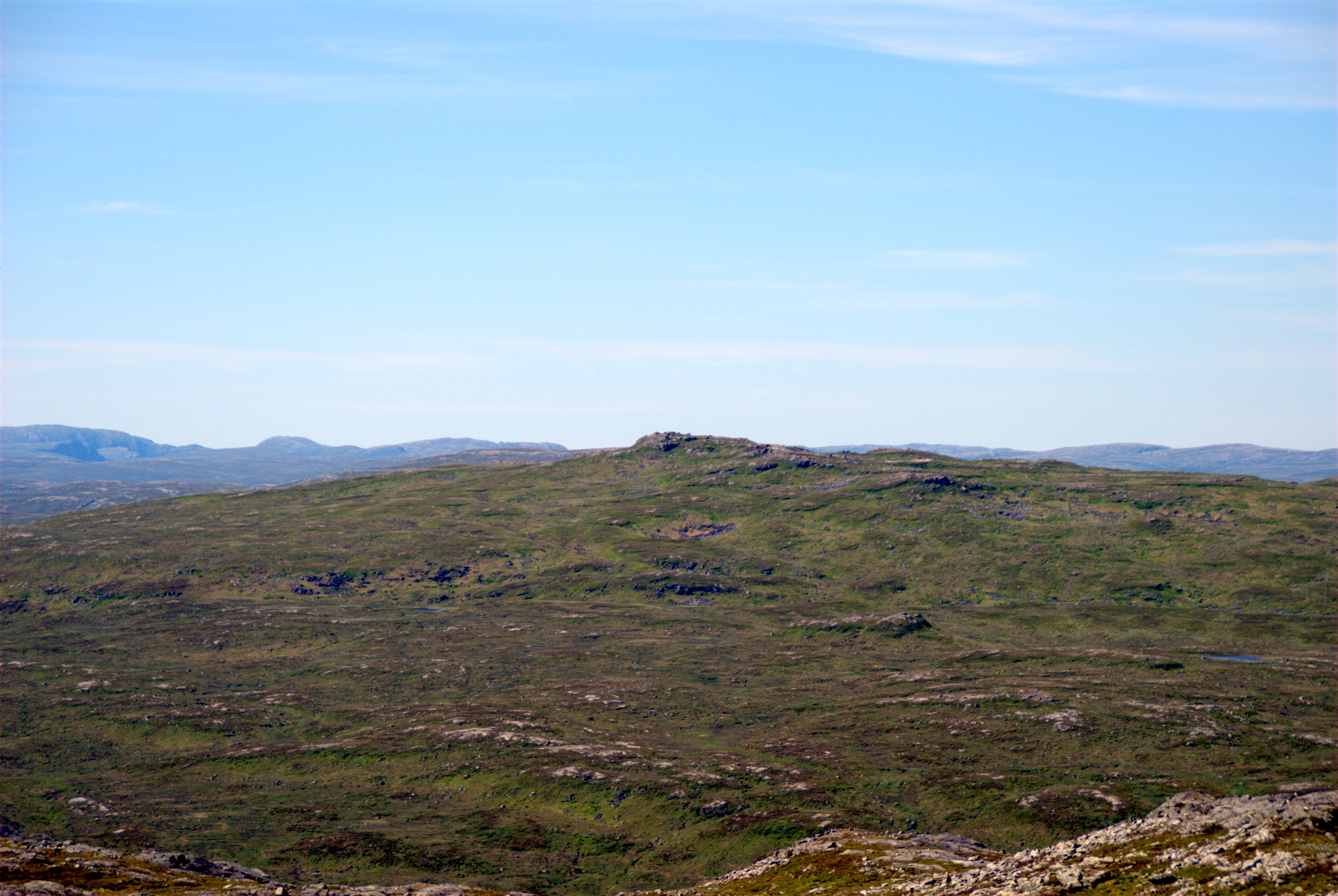
View of the highest point in Roan municipality

Roan was located on the Fosen peninsula between Åfjord Municipality (to the south) and Osen Municipality (to the north), with Namdalseid Municipality to the east. Roan also included a number of islands in the Atlantic Ocean to the west. Three major fjords cut into the landscape: the Brandsfjorden in the north, Bersfjorden in the central part, and the Skjørafjorden in the south. The Kaura lighthouse was located on a small island in the mouth of the Brandsfjorden. The Hellfjorden is a small fjord arm that branches off the main Brandsfjorden.

The landscape was very hilly, with bare mountaintops reaching 400 to 600 metres (1,300 to 2,000 ft) above sea level. The highest point in the municipality is the 644.3-metre (2,114 ft) tall mountain Dåapma, located on the border with Namdalseid Municipality.

== Government ==
While it existed, Roan Municipality was responsible for primary education (through 10th grade), outpatient health services, senior citizen services, welfare and other social services, zoning, economic development, and municipal roads and utilities. The municipality was governed by a municipal council of directly elected representatives. The mayor was indirectly elected by a vote of the municipal council. The municipality was under the jurisdiction of the Fosen District Court and the Frostating Court of Appeal.

Municipal waste management was since 1995 handled by the inter-municipal Midtre Namdal Avfallsselskap.

=== Municipal council ===
The municipal council (Kommunestyre) of Roan Municipality is made up of 17 representatives that are elected to four year terms. The tables below show the historical composition of the council by political party.

Roan kommunestyre 2015–2019
Party name (in Norwegian)	Number of representatives
Labour Party (Arbeiderpartiet)	4
Conservative Party (Høyre)	5
Christian Democratic Party (Kristelig Folkeparti)	1
Centre Party (Senterpartiet)	5
Liberal Party (Venstre)	2
Total number of members:	17
Note: On 1 January 2020, Roan Municipality became part of Åfjord Municipality.

Roan kommunestyre 2011–2015
Party name (in Norwegian)	Number of representatives
Labour Party (Arbeiderpartiet)	2
Conservative Party (Høyre)	4
Christian Democratic Party (Kristelig Folkeparti)	1
Centre Party (Senterpartiet)	8
Liberal Party (Venstre)	2
Total number of members:	17

Roan kommunestyre 2007–2011
Party name (in Norwegian)	Number of representatives
Labour Party (Arbeiderpartiet)	4
Conservative Party (Høyre)	5
Christian Democratic Party (Kristelig Folkeparti)	2
Centre Party (Senterpartiet)	4
Liberal Party (Venstre)	2
Total number of members:	17

Roan kommunestyre 2003–2007
Party name (in Norwegian)	Number of representatives
Labour Party (Arbeiderpartiet)	2
Conservative Party (Høyre)	5
Christian Democratic Party (Kristelig Folkeparti)	2
Centre Party (Senterpartiet)	6
Future list - Local list for Bessaker (Framtidslista - Bygdeliste for Bessaker)	2
Total number of members:	17

Roan kommunestyre 1999–2003
Party name (in Norwegian)	Number of representatives
Labour Party (Arbeiderpartiet)	2
Conservative Party (Høyre)	5
Christian Democratic Party (Kristelig Folkeparti)	1
Centre Party (Senterpartiet)	7
Socialist Left Party (Sosialistisk Venstreparti)	2
Total number of members:	17

Roan kommunestyre 1995–1999
Party name (in Norwegian)	Number of representatives
Labour Party (Arbeiderpartiet)	2
Conservative Party (Høyre)	4
Christian Democratic Party (Kristelig Folkeparti)	2
Centre Party (Senterpartiet)	6
Liberal Party (Venstre)	2
Roan Municipality's Local List (Roan kommunes Bygdeliste)	1
Total number of members:	17

Roan kommunestyre 1991–1995
Party name (in Norwegian)	Number of representatives
Labour Party (Arbeiderpartiet)	2
Conservative Party (Høyre)	4
Christian Democratic Party (Kristelig Folkeparti)	2
Centre Party (Senterpartiet)	4
Liberal Party (Venstre)	1
Roan Municipality Local List (Roan kommunes Bygdeliste)	4
Total number of members:	17

Roan kommunestyre 1987–1991
Party name (in Norwegian)	Number of representatives
Labour Party (Arbeiderpartiet)	5
Conservative Party (Høyre)	5
Christian Democratic Party (Kristelig Folkeparti)	2
Centre Party (Senterpartiet)	4
Liberal Party (Venstre)	1
Total number of members:	17

Roan kommunestyre 1983–1987
Party name (in Norwegian)	Number of representatives
Labour Party (Arbeiderpartiet)	5
Conservative Party (Høyre)	6
Christian Democratic Party (Kristelig Folkeparti)	2
Centre Party (Senterpartiet)	3
Liberal Party (Venstre)	1
Total number of members:	17

Roan kommunestyre 1979–1983
Party name (in Norwegian)	Number of representatives
Labour Party (Arbeiderpartiet)	4
Conservative Party (Høyre)	5
Christian Democratic Party (Kristelig Folkeparti)	2
Centre Party (Senterpartiet)	4
Joint list of the Liberal Party (Venstre) and New People's Party (Nye Folkepartiet)	2
Total number of members:	17

Roan kommunestyre 1975–1979
Party name (in Norwegian)	Number of representatives
Labour Party (Arbeiderpartiet)	3
Conservative Party (Høyre)	3
Christian Democratic Party (Kristelig Folkeparti)	3
Centre Party (Senterpartiet)	5
Joint list of the Liberal Party (Venstre) and New People's Party (Nye Folkepartiet)	3
Total number of members:	17

Roan kommunestyre 1971–1975
Party name (in Norwegian)	Number of representatives
Labour Party (Arbeiderpartiet)	5
Conservative Party (Høyre)	2
Christian Democratic Party (Kristelig Folkeparti)	2
Centre Party (Senterpartiet)	4
Liberal Party (Venstre)	1
Local List(s) (Lokale lister)	3
Total number of members:	17

Roan kommunestyre 1967–1971
Party name (in Norwegian)	Number of representatives
Labour Party (Arbeiderpartiet)	4
Conservative Party (Høyre)	2
Christian Democratic Party (Kristelig Folkeparti)	2
Centre Party (Senterpartiet)	3
Liberal Party (Venstre)	2
Local List(s) (Lokale lister)	4
Total number of members:	17

Roan kommunestyre 1963–1967
Party name (in Norwegian)	Number of representatives
Labour Party (Arbeiderpartiet)	5
Conservative Party (Høyre)	2
Christian Democratic Party (Kristelig Folkeparti)	2
Centre Party (Senterpartiet)	3
Liberal Party (Venstre)	2
Local List(s) (Lokale lister)	3
Total number of members:	17

Roan herredsstyre 1959–1963
Party name (in Norwegian)	Number of representatives
Labour Party (Arbeiderpartiet)	4
Conservative Party (Høyre)	3
Christian Democratic Party (Kristelig Folkeparti)	3
Centre Party (Senterpartiet)	3
Liberal Party (Venstre)	2
Local List(s) (Lokale lister)	2
Total number of members:	17

Roan herredsstyre 1955–1959
Party name (in Norwegian)	Number of representatives
Labour Party (Arbeiderpartiet)	4
Conservative Party (Høyre)	1
Christian Democratic Party (Kristelig Folkeparti)	3
Farmers' Party (Bondepartiet)	3
Liberal Party (Venstre)	2
Local List(s) (Lokale lister)	4
Total number of members:	17

Roan herredsstyre 1951–1955
Party name (in Norwegian)	Number of representatives
Labour Party (Arbeiderpartiet)	3
Christian Democratic Party (Kristelig Folkeparti)	3
Liberal Party (Venstre)	2
Joint List(s) of Non-Socialist Parties (Borgerlige Felleslister)	4
Local List(s) (Lokale lister)	4
Total number of members:	16

Roan herredsstyre 1947–1951
Party name (in Norwegian)	Number of representatives
Labour Party (Arbeiderpartiet)	4
Liberal Party (Venstre)	1
Local List(s) (Lokale lister)	11
Total number of members:	16

Roan herredsstyre 1945–1947
Party name (in Norwegian)	Number of representatives
Labour Party (Arbeiderpartiet)	5
Liberal Party (Venstre)	3
Joint List(s) of Non-Socialist Parties (Borgerlige Felleslister)	4
Local List(s) (Lokale lister)	4
Total number of members:	16

Roan herredsstyre 1937–1941*
Party name (in Norwegian)	Number of representatives
Labour Party (Arbeiderpartiet)	3
Conservative Party (Høyre)	1
Farmers' Party (Bondepartiet)	3
Liberal Party (Venstre)	2
Joint List(s) of Non-Socialist Parties (Borgerlige Felleslister)	1
Local List(s) (Lokale lister)	6
Total number of members:	16
Note: Due to the German occupation of Norway during World War II, no elections were held for new municipal councils until after the war ended in 1945.

=== Mayors ===
The mayor (Norwegian: ordfører) of Roan Municipality was the political leader of the municipality and the chairperson of the municipal council. Here is a list of people who held this position:

- 1892–1907: John Hopstad (MV/V)
- 1908–1919: Johan Stinessen (V)
- 1920–1922: Henrik Guttelvik (V)
- 1923–1925: Johan Stinessen (V)
- 1926–1931: Anton Lindbak Nilssen (Bp)
- 1932–1937: Menelai Næss (V)
- 1938–1945: Anton Lindbak Nilssen (Bp)
- 1946–1951: Kristian Strøm (KrF)
- 1952–1959: Anton Lindbak Nilssen (Bp)
- 1960–1963: Hans Viken (H)
- 1964–1979: Magnar Wiik (Ap)
- 1980–1985: Johan Nerdal (Sp)
- 1986–1987: Jan Utkilen (H)
- 1988–1991: Henning Martinsen (H)
- 1992–1995: Erling Eian (H)
- 1995–1999: Henning Martinsen (H)
- 1999–2003: Oddvar Dahl (Sp)
- 2003–2011: Albert Larsen (H)
- 2011–2015: Jan Helge Grydeland (Sp)
- 2015–2019: Einar Eian (H)

== Population ==
Almost all the inhabitants lived along the coast or in the Hofstaddalen valley. The islands were all generally uninhabited with few exceptions. The island of Brandsøya, which has a bridge connecting it to the mainland, had some inhabitants. There are only two roads leaving the municipality: one going south to Å in Åfjord Municipality and one to the north to Osen Municipality.

== See also ==
- List of former municipalities of Norway
