= Bessaker =

Village in Åfjord Municipality, Norway

- Village
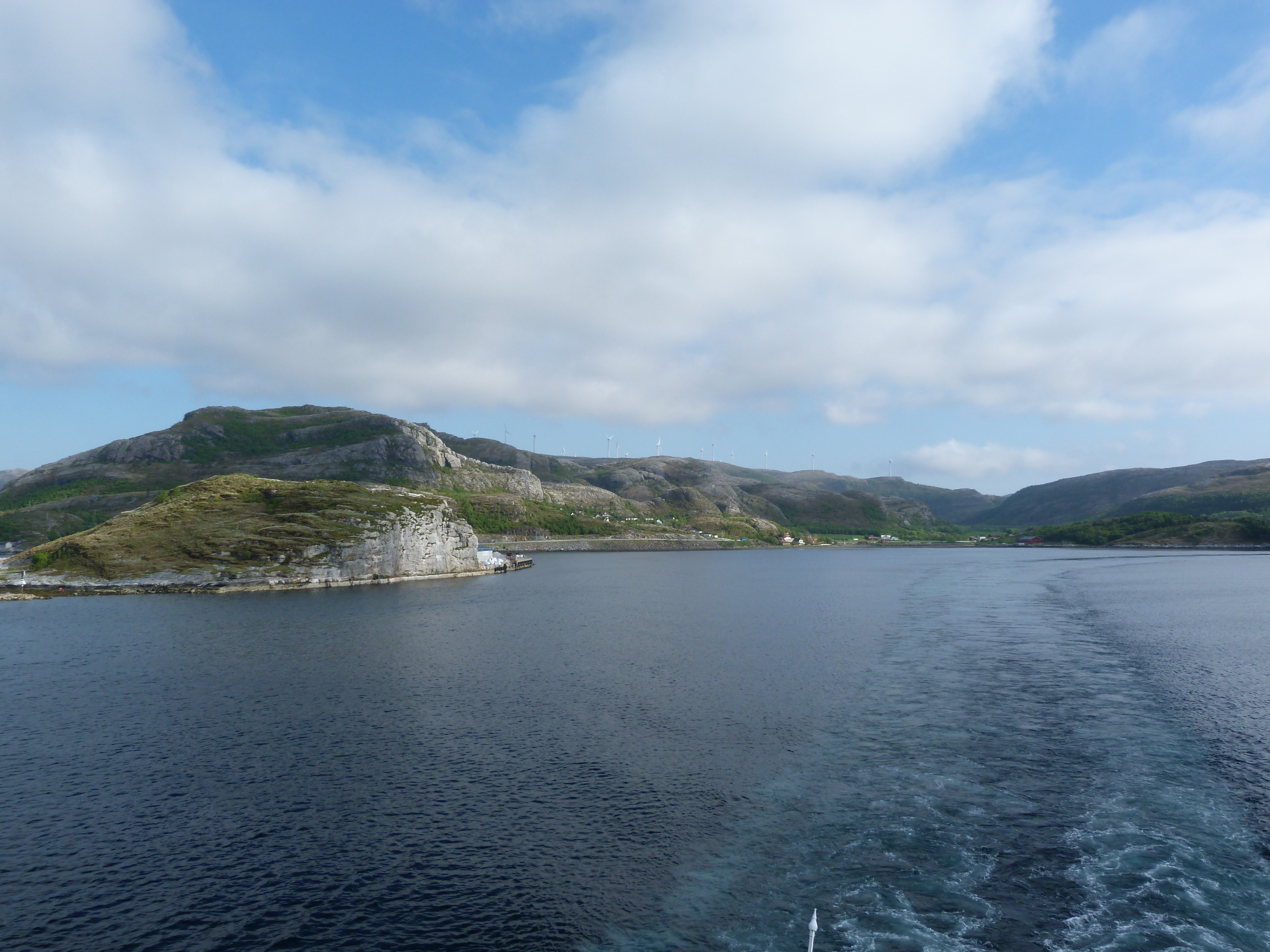
- View of the village
- Interactive map of Bessaker
- Location within Trøndelag Location within Norway
- Coordinates: 64.2454°N 10.3247°E
- Country: Norway
- Region: Central Norway
- County: Trøndelag
- District: Fosen
- Municipality: Åfjord Municipality
- Elevation: 11 m (36 ft)
- Time zone: UTC+01:00 (CET)
  - Summer (DST): UTC+02:00 (CEST)
- Post Code: 7190 Bessaker

Bessaker is a coastal fishing village in Åfjord Municipality in Trøndelag county, Norway. It is located north of the Brandsfjorden, about a 30-kilometre (19 mi) drive (to the southwest) to the village of Roan and about a 15-kilometre (9.3 mi) drive (to the northeast) to the village of Steinsdalen in neighboring Osen Municipality. The village of Bessaker has about 200 inhabitants.

Bessaker has a good harbor and it was previously visited regularly by the Hurtigruten, but today the ships call there on special occasions only, such as the annual fisheries festival, the Fiskefestivalen. The Kaura Lighthouse lies about 9 kilometres (5.6 mi) west of the village and the islands of Skjervøya lie about 5 kilometres (3.1 mi) to the north.
