= Einar Hepsø =

Norwegian fishers' leader and politician

Einar Hepsø (25 December 1926 – 27 October 2005) was a Norwegian fishers' leader and politician for the Labour Party.

He served as a deputy representative to the Parliament of Norway from Sør-Trøndelag during the terms 1977–1981 and 1981–1985. In total he met during 14 days of parliamentary session. He served as mayor of Osen Municipality from 1984 to 1985 and 1995 to 2003, and chaired Norges Fiskarlag from 1984 to 1994.
