= Buholmråsa Lighthouse =

Coastal lighthouse in Norway

Buholmråsa Lighthouse Buholmråsa fyrstasjon
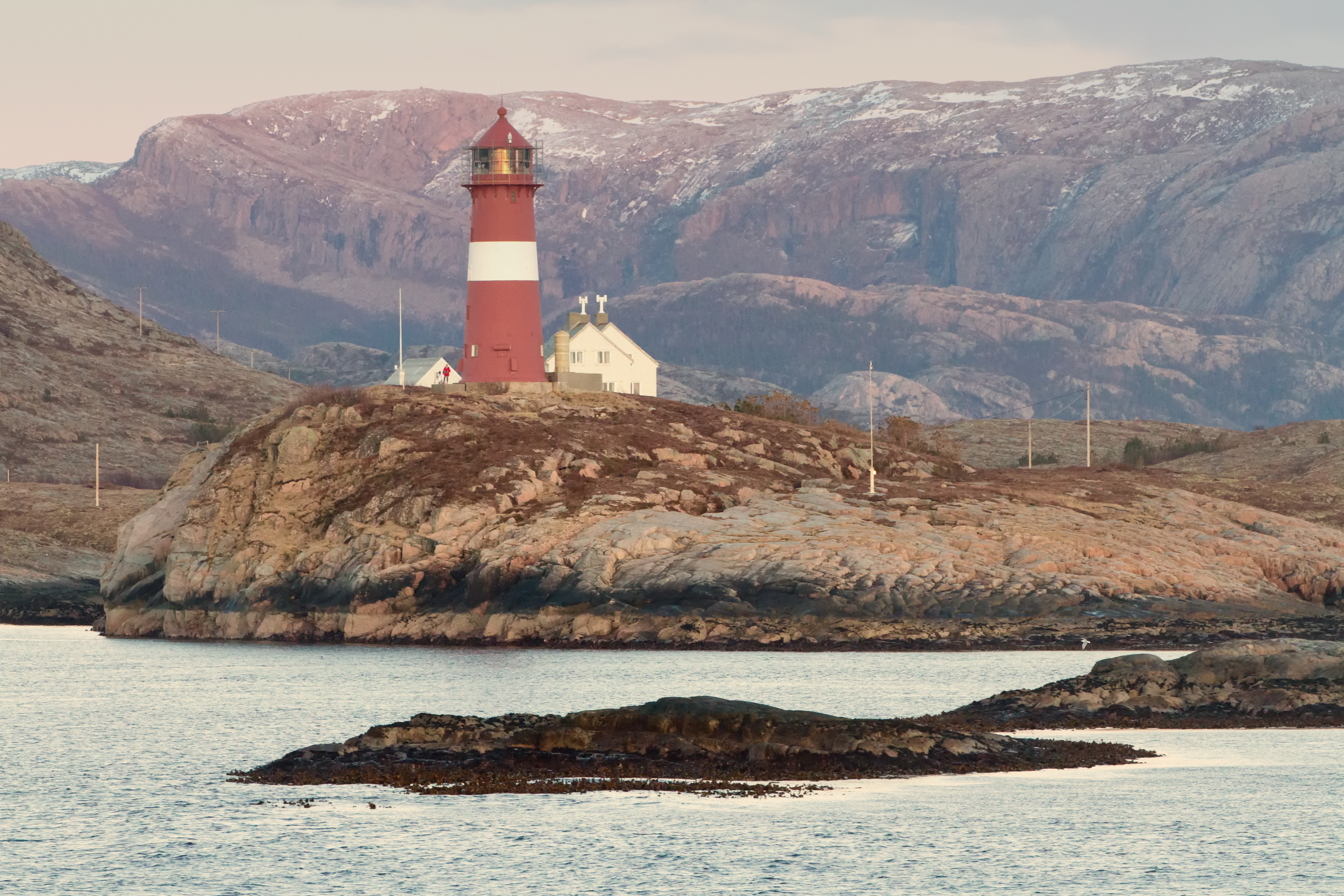
- Location: Sønnaholmen, Osen Municipality, Norway
- Coordinates: 64°24′06″N 10°27′10″E

Tower
- Constructed: 1917
- Construction: cast iron
- Automated: 1994
- Height: 23.5 m (77 ft)
- Shape: cylinder
- Markings: red (tower), white (stripe)
- Heritage: cultural property
- Racon: B

Light
- Focal height: 38 m (125 ft)
- Intensity: 140,400 candela
- Range: 19.3 nmi (35.7 km; 22.2 mi) (white), 16.3 nmi (30.2 km; 18.8 mi) (red), 15.8 nmi (29.3 km; 18.2 mi) (green)
- Characteristic: Oc WRG 6s

The Buholmråsa Lighthouse (Norwegian: Buholmråsa fyr) is a coastal lighthouse in Osen Municipality in Trøndelag county, Norway. The lighthouse is located in the Svesfjorden on the small island Sønnaholmen about 2 kilometres (1.2 mi) northwest of the village of Seter. It was built in 1917 and automated in 1994. The Kya Lighthouse lies on a small island in the open ocean about 13.5 kilometres (8.4 mi) to the northwest of Buholmråsa Lighthouse. During World War II, air raids damaged some of the buildings at this station.

The 23.5-metre (77 ft) tall, round, cast iron lighthouse is red with one white stripe and it can be seen for up to 19.3 nautical miles (35.7 km; 22.2 mi). The light sits on top at an elevation of 38 metres (125 ft) above sea level. The 140,400-candela light emits a white, red, or green light (depending on direction), occulting once every six seconds. The lighthouse also broadcasts a racon signal that is a morse code letter B (-•••).

== See also ==
- Lighthouses in Norway
- List of lighthouses in Norway
