= Norwegian Association of the Disabled =

Norwegian disability organization

The Norwegian Association of the Disabled (Norwegian: Norges Handikapforbund, NHF) is an interest organization for disabled people in Norway. The organization has eleven suborganizations for people with specific disabilities, a youth branch, nine regional and three hundred local groups. The goal is full equality and participation in society for people with reduced mobility. The Association is made up of regional and municipal groups. Notable former members of the association include Julie Næss.
