= Kaura Lighthouse =

Coastal lighthouse in Norway

Kaura Lighthouse Kaura fyr
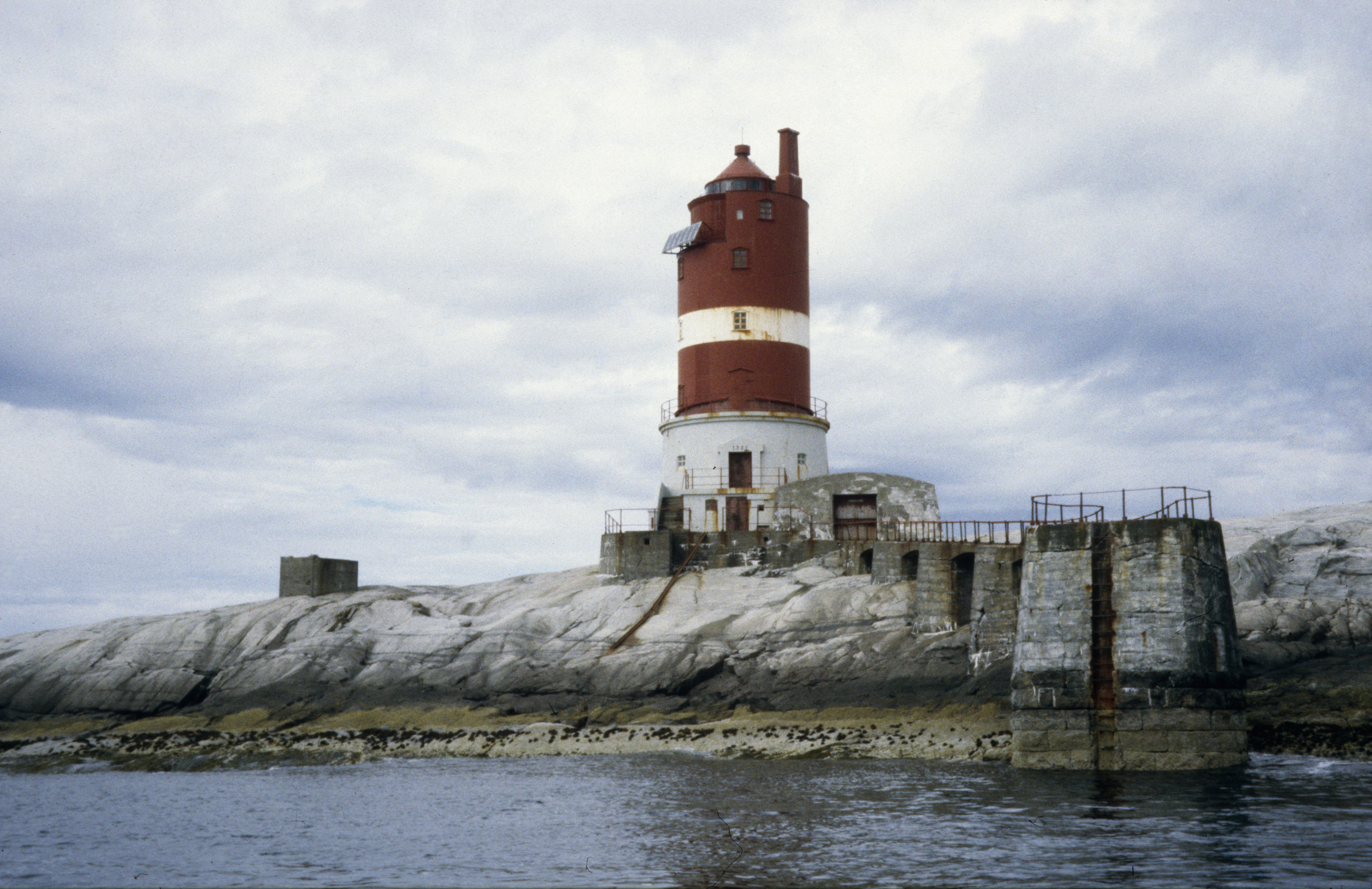
- View of the lighthouse
- Location: Trøndelag, Norway
- Coordinates: 64°13′49″N 10°07′59″E

Tower
- Constructed: 1931
- Foundation: Stone
- Construction: Cast iron
- Automated: 1959
- Height: 22 metres (72 ft)
- Shape: Cylindrical tower
- Markings: Red with one white band and white basement
- Heritage: cultural property

Light
- Focal height: 30 metres (98 ft)
- Intensity: 4,050 candela
- Range: Red: 8.4 nmi (15.6 km; 9.7 mi) Green: 7.9 nmi (14.6 km; 9.1 mi) White: 10.8 nmi (20.0 km; 12.4 mi)
- Characteristic: Fl (2) WRG 10s
- Norway no.: 485800

Kaura Lighthouse (Norwegian: Kaura fyr) is a coastal lighthouse in Åfjord Municipality in Trøndelag county, Norway. The 22-metre (72 ft) tall tower is located on the small island of Kaura in the mouth of the Brandsfjorden about 9 kilometres (5.6 mi) west of the village of Bessaker and about 8 kilometres (5.0 mi) northwest of the village of Roan. The lighthouse was built in 1931 and automated in 1959.

The red, cylindrical, cast iron tower has one white stripe around it and a white, stone foundation. The light sits at the top, at an elevation of 30 metres (98 ft) above sea level. The 4,050-candela light emits two flashes every 10 seconds, flashing white, red, or green depending on direction. It can be seen for 10.8 nautical miles (20.0 km; 12.4 mi). There is a concrete boathouse on the shore of the small island that is connected to the lighthouse by a 40-metre (130 ft) long concrete bridge.

== See also ==
- Lighthouses in Norway
- List of lighthouses in Norway
