= Kya Lighthouse =

Coastal lighthouse in Norway

Kya Lighthouse Kya fyrstasjon
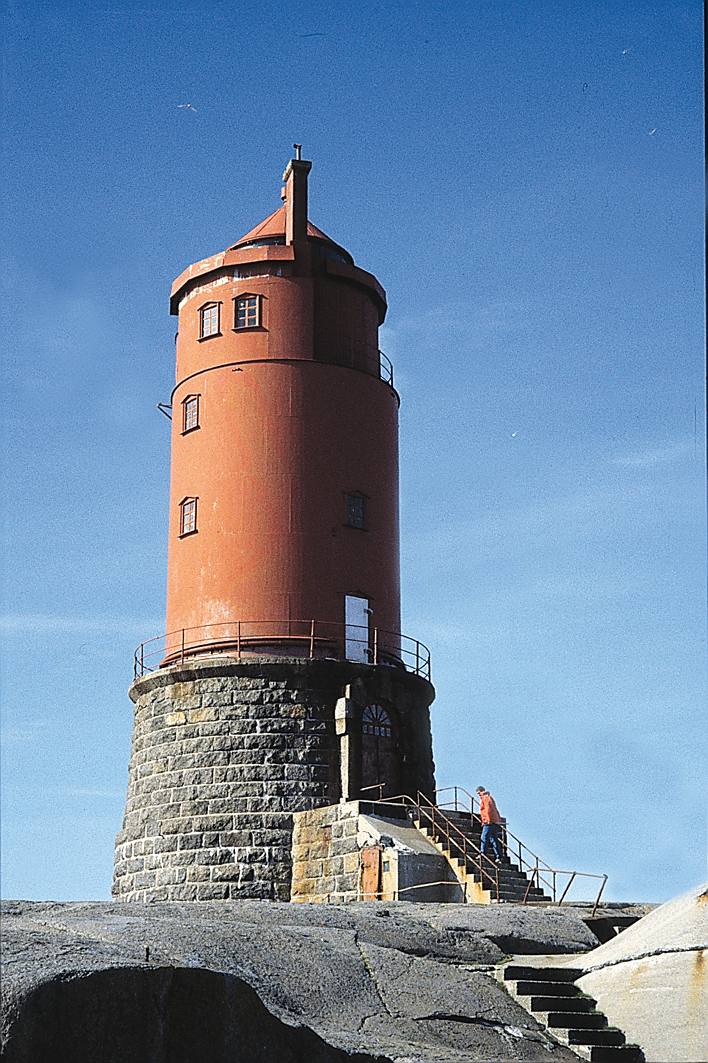
- View of the lighthouse
- Location: Osen Municipality, Norway
- Coordinates: 64°27′50″N 10°12′43″E

Tower
- Constructed: 1920
- Construction: cast iron (tower), stone (foundation)
- Automated: 1958
- Height: 22 m (72 ft)
- Shape: cylinder
- Markings: red (tower)
- Power source: solar power
- Heritage: cultural heritage preservation in Norway

Light
- Focal height: 29 m (95 ft)
- Intensity: 4,000 candela
- Range: 10 nmi (19 km; 12 mi) (white)
- Characteristic: Fl W 10s

The Kya Lighthouse (Norwegian: Kya fyrstasjon) is a coastal lighthouse in Osen Municipality in Trøndelag county, Norway. The lighthouse is located on the small island of Kya in the ocean about 15 kilometres (9.3 mi) northwest of the village of Seter. The Buholmråsa Lighthouse is located nearby, closer to the mainland. It was built in 1920 and it was automated in 1958. The lighthouse was one of the most exposed lighthouses on the Norwegian coast due to its distance from the mainland and lack of nearby islands. The lighthouse has endured repeated storm damage over the years. It was also a very difficult assignment for lighthouse keepers prior to its automation in 1958. The facility is only accessible by boat.

The light on top of the 22.5-metre (74 ft) tall, red, cast iron lighthouse can be seen for up to 10 nautical miles (19 km; 12 mi). The 4000-candela light sits at an elevation of 29 metres (95 ft) above sea level. The light emits a white flash every 10 seconds. The light is only lit from July 25 until May 12 every year, but is not lit during the late spring and early summer due to the midnight sun.

== See also ==
- Lighthouses in Norway
- List of lighthouses in Norway
