= Seter, Osen =

Village in Osen Municipality, Norway

Seter
- Village
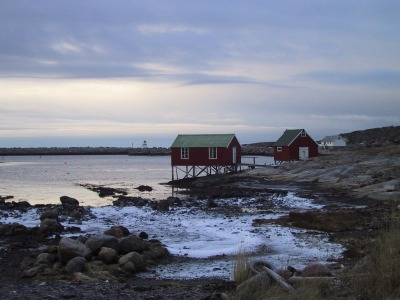
- View of the village shore area
- Interactive map of Seter
- Location within Trøndelag Location within Norway
- Coordinates: 64°23′34″N 10°29′24″E
- Country: Norway
- Region: Central Norway
- County: Trøndelag
- District: Fosen
- Municipality: Osen Municipality
- Elevation: 16 m (52 ft)
- Time zone: UTC+01:00 (CET)
  - Summer (DST): UTC+02:00 (CEST)
- Post Code: 7748 Sætervik

Seter is a village in Osen Municipality in Trøndelag county, Norway. It is located along the Svesfjorden in the northern part of the municipality, although it has no direct road connection to the southern part of the municipality. The only road connection is to the neighboring Flatanger Municipality to the north.

Seter Chapel is located in the village. The Buholmråsa Lighthouse and Kya Lighthouse are both located to the northwest of the village.
