= Hellfjorden (Trøndelag) =

Fjord in Trøndelag, Norway

- Interactive map of the fjord
- Location: Trøndelag county, Norway
- Coordinates: 64°12′6.8220″N 10°17′34.138″E
- Type: Fjord
- Primary outflows: Brandsfjorden
- Basin countries: Norway
- Max. length: 2.5 kilometres (1.6 mi)
- Max. width: 1 kilometre (0.62 mi)

Hellfjorden is an arm of the Brandsfjorden in Åfjord Municipality in Trøndelag county, Norway. The 2.5-kilometre (1.6 mi) long fjord runs from the mountain Nordfjellet to the north where it joins the Brandsfjorden near the island of Terningen. The village of Sumstad lies along the eastern side of the fjord. The Norwegian County Road 14 runs along the southern and eastern sides of the fjord.

== See also ==
- List of Norwegian fjords
