= Osen (village) =

Village in Osen Municipality, Norway

Osen Steinsdalen
- Village
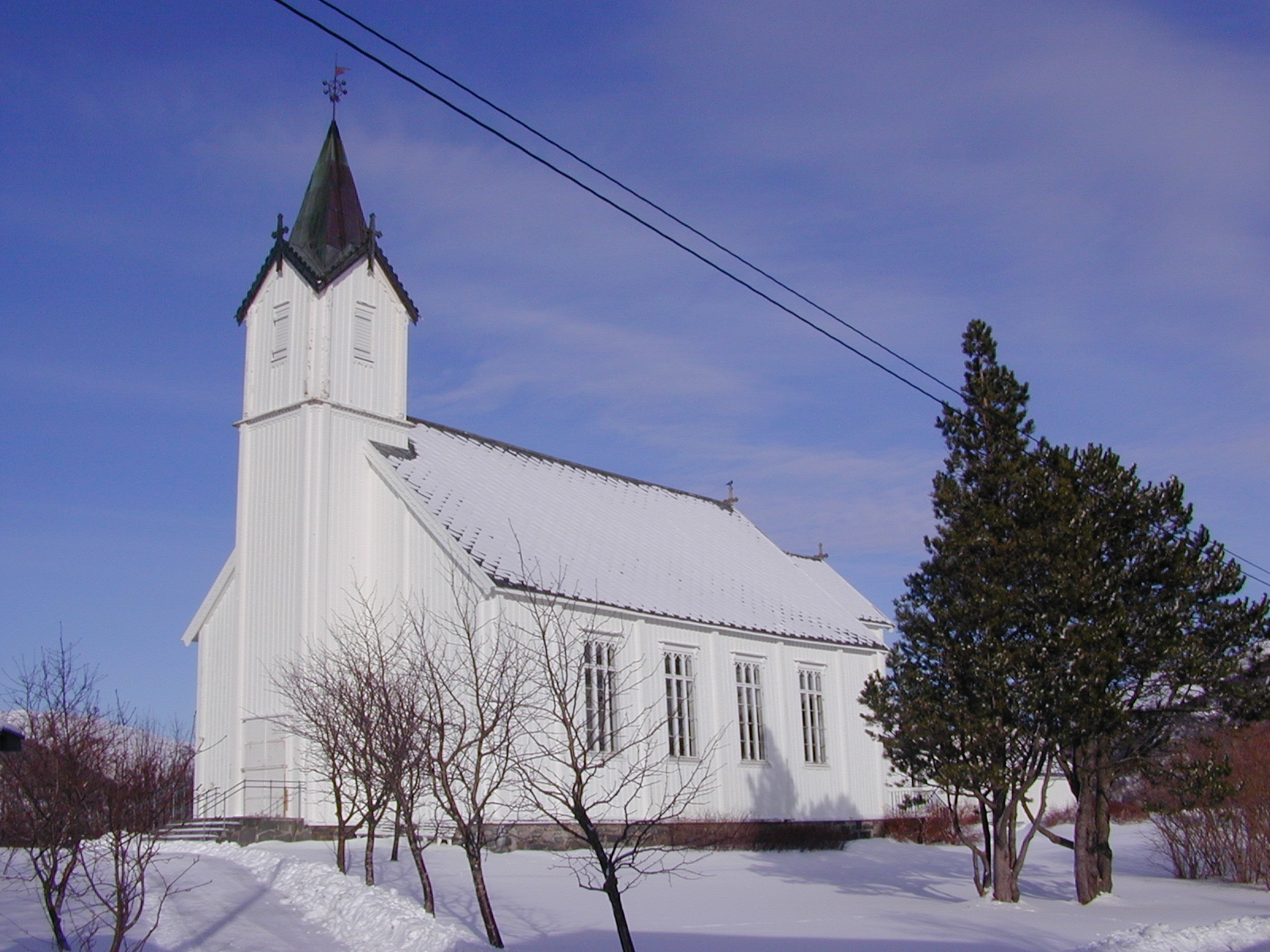
- View of the local Osen Church
- Interactive map of Osen
- Location within Trøndelag Location within Norway
- Coordinates: 64.29761°N 10.51057°E
- Country: Norway
- Region: Central Norway
- County: Trøndelag
- District: Fosen
- Municipality: Osen Municipality
- Elevation: 21 m (69 ft)
- Time zone: UTC+01:00 (CET)
  - Summer (DST): UTC+02:00 (CEST)
- Post Code: 7740 Steinsdalen

Osen (sometimes called Steinsdalen) is the administrative centre of Osen Municipality in Trøndelag county, Norway. It is located about 15 kilometres (9.3 mi) northeast of the village of Bessaker (in Åfjord Municipality and about 15 kilometres (9.3 mi) south of the village of Seter (by ferry - if driving by road to Seter, it would be over 100 kilometres (62 mi) through two other municipalities). Osen Church is located in the village.

== Name ==
The village area is officially named Osen by the Norwegian Mapping Authority. The village area lies in the lower part of the Steinsdalen valley, at the mouth of the river Steinsdalselva, so the village is sometimes called Steinsdalen.

== Notable residents ==
- Julie Næss (1896–1973), a disability rights activist, was born in Osen.
