= Roan Church =

Church in Trøndelag, Norway

- Roan kirke
- Fosen Cathedral
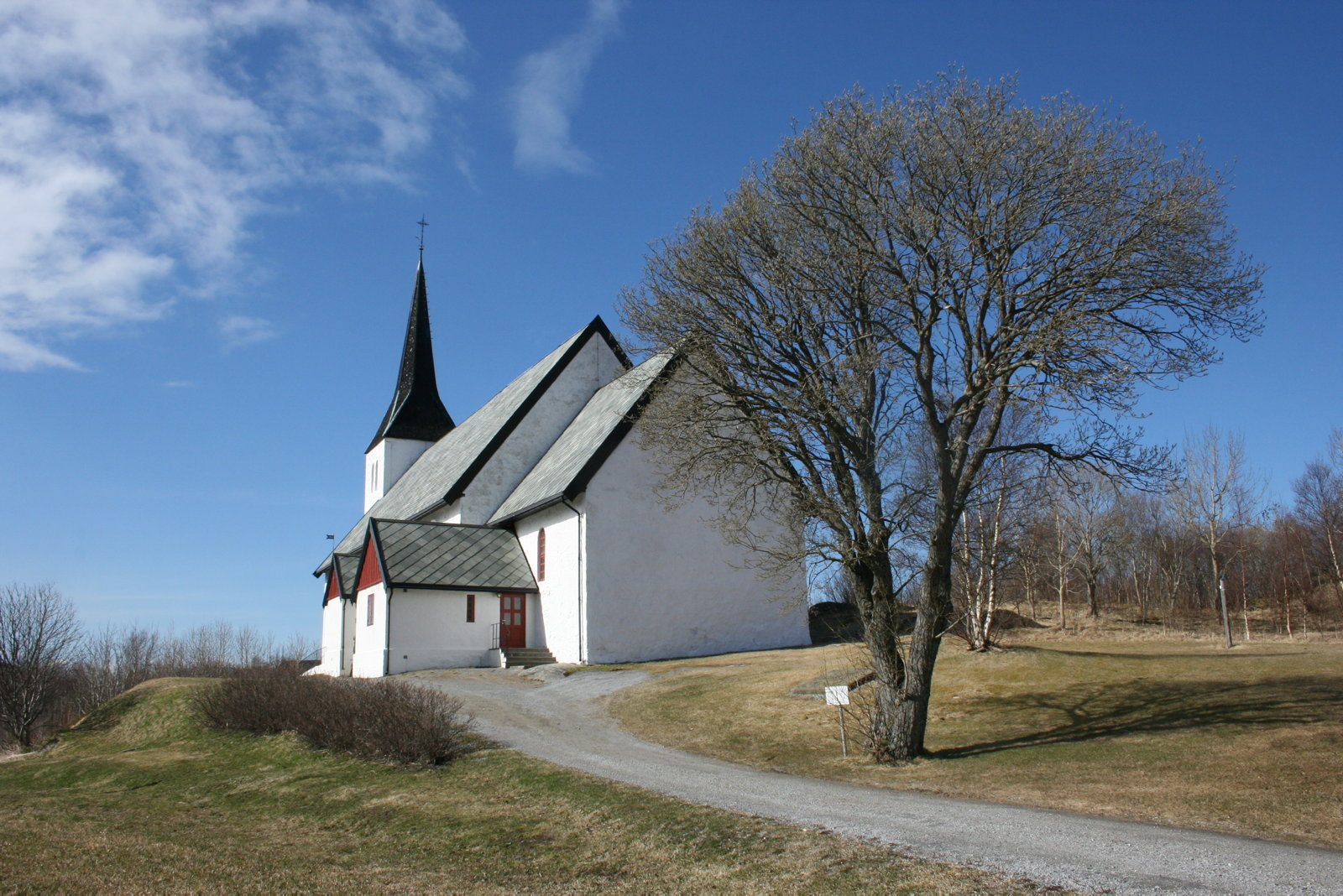
- View of the church
- Roan Church
- 64.1722754°N 10.22685259°E
- Location: Åfjord Municipality, Trøndelag
- Country: Norway
- Denomination: Church of Norway
- Churchmanship: Evangelical Lutheran

History
- Former name: Bjørnør kirke
- Status: Parish church
- Founded: 14th century
- Consecrated: 1702

Architecture
- Functional status: Active
- Architect: Morten Jørgensen Bjørnør
- Architectural type: Basilica
- Completed: 1702 (324 years ago)

Specifications
- Capacity: 450
- Materials: Stone

Administration
- Diocese: Nidaros bispedømme
- Deanery: Fosen prosti
- Parish: Roan

Clergy
- Rector: Rev Einar Strøm
- Dean: Very Rev Brita Hardeberg
- Norwegian Cultural Heritage Site
- Type: Basilica
- Status: Automatically protected
- ID: 85306

Roan Church (nicknamed Fosen Cathedral; Norwegian: Roan kirke or Fosenkatedralen) is a parish church of the Church of Norway in Åfjord Municipality in Trøndelag county, Norway. It is located in the village of Roan. It is the church for Roan parish which is part of the Fosen prosti (deanery) in the Diocese of Nidaros of the (Evangelical, Lutheran) Church of Norway. The white, stone structure was built in the Basilica style in 1702 to the designs of architect Morten Jørgensen Bjørnør. The church seats about 450 people.

== History ==
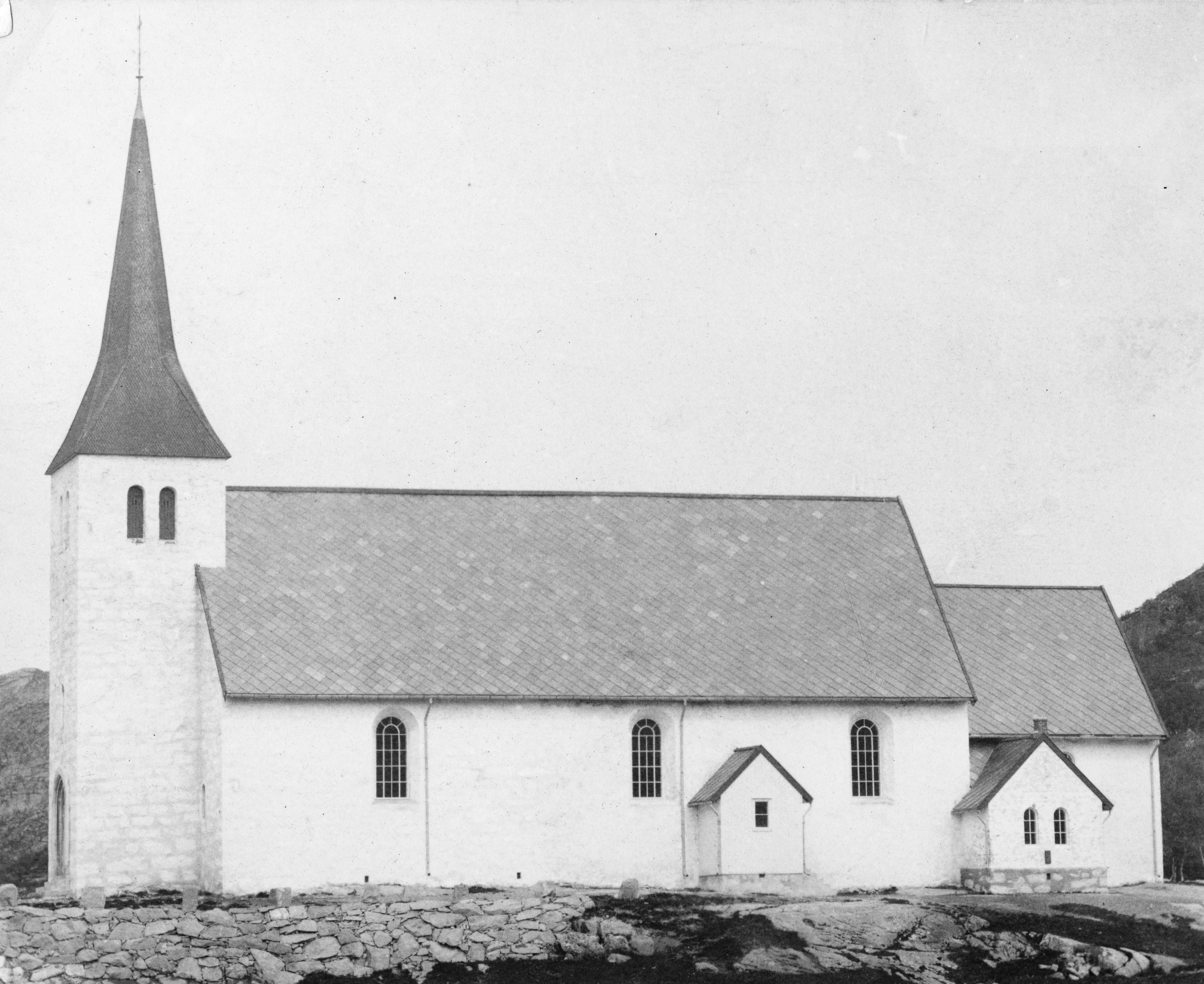
Side view of the church

The earliest historical record of a church building on this site dates back to the year 1499, but this was not the year of the current church's construction. The very first church at Roan was a stave church called Bjørnør Church, which was located about 300 metres (980 ft) east of the present building. On 7 February 1690, the old church suffered fire damage and was likely repaired afterwards. By the year 1700, just 10 years later, it was described as being in poor condition and dilapidated, and so (in 1702) the present day stone church was constructed, approximately 300 metres (980 ft) west of the previous location. In 1884, the nave was extended by 12 metres (39 ft) to the west using plans drawn up by the architect Ole Falck Ebbell and at the same time, a new bell tower was constructed at the west end of the church.

=== Election church ===
In 1814, the current church served as an election church (Norwegian: valgkirke). Together with more than 300 other parish churches throughout Norway, it served as a polling station for the country's first national elections to the 1814 Norwegian Constituent Assembly which was responsible for writing the Constitution of Norway. Each ecclesiastical parish was a constituency which selected "electors" who later met together, in each county, to choose the representatives for the assembly that was to meet at Eidsvoll Manor later that year.

== Notable burials ==
- Julie Næss (1896–1973), disability rights activist.

== See also ==
- List of churches in Nidaros
