= Roan (village) =

Village in Åfjord Municipality, Norway

- Village
- Interactive map of Roan
- Location within Trøndelag Location within Norway
- Coordinates: 64.1727°N 10.2291°E
- Country: Norway
- Region: Central Norway
- County: Trøndelag
- District: Fosen
- Municipality: Åfjord Municipality
- Elevation: 8 m (26 ft)
- Time zone: UTC+01:00 (CET)
  - Summer (DST): UTC+02:00 (CEST)
- Post Code: 7180 Roan

Roan is a village in Åfjord Municipality in Trøndelag county, Norway. The village is located along the Norwegian Sea on the west coast of the Fosen peninsula, about 10 kilometres (6.2 mi) south of the nearby coastal village of Bessaker. The Berfjorden and the island of Brandsøya lie just offshore of the village of Roan. Roan Church is located in the village.

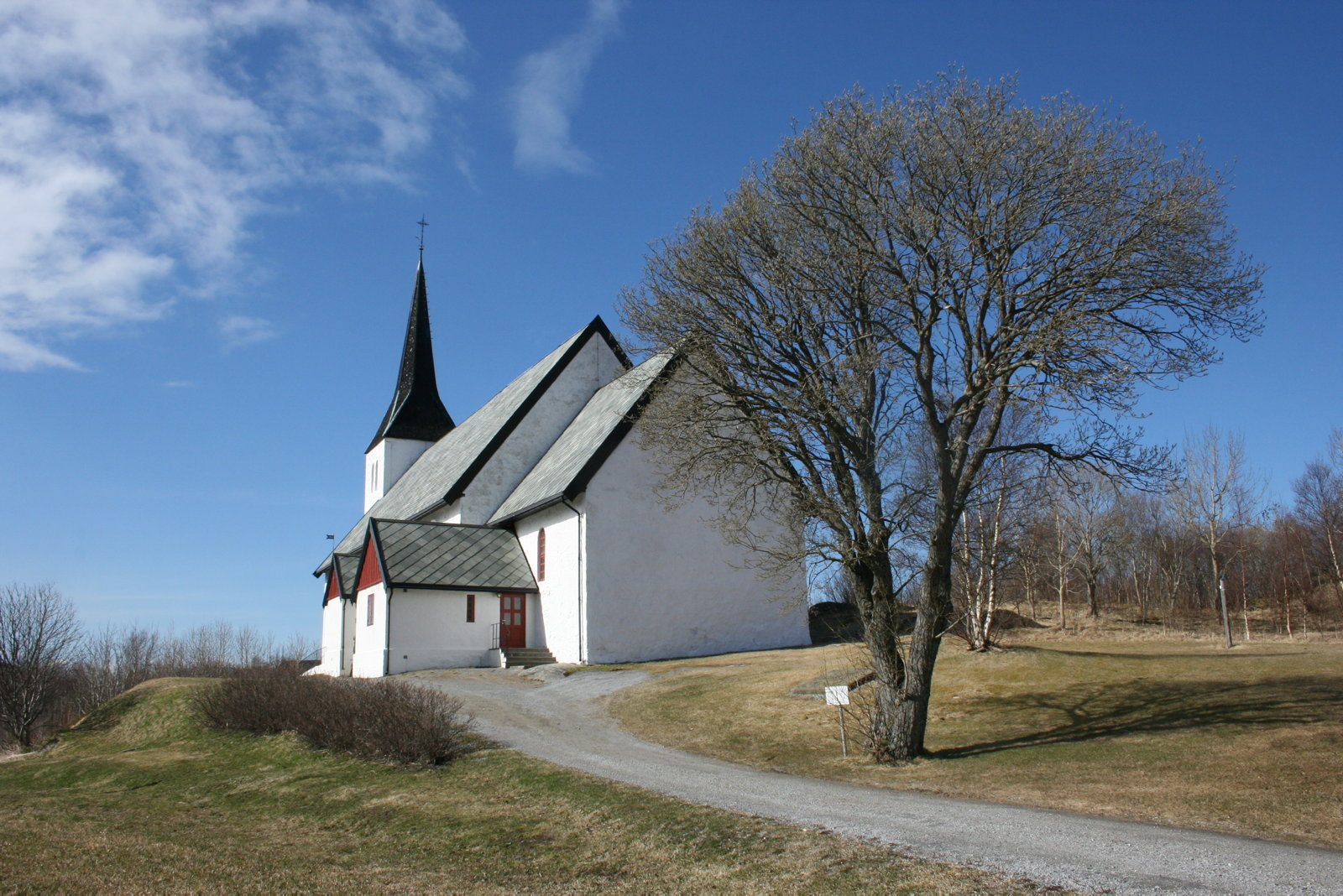
Roan Church

The village was the administrative centre of the old Roan Municipality prior to 2020 when it was merged into Åfjord Municipality.

== Notable residents ==
- Julie Næss (1896–1973), a disability rights activist, spent much of her life in Roan.
