= Osen Church =

Church in Trøndelag, Norway

- Osen kirke
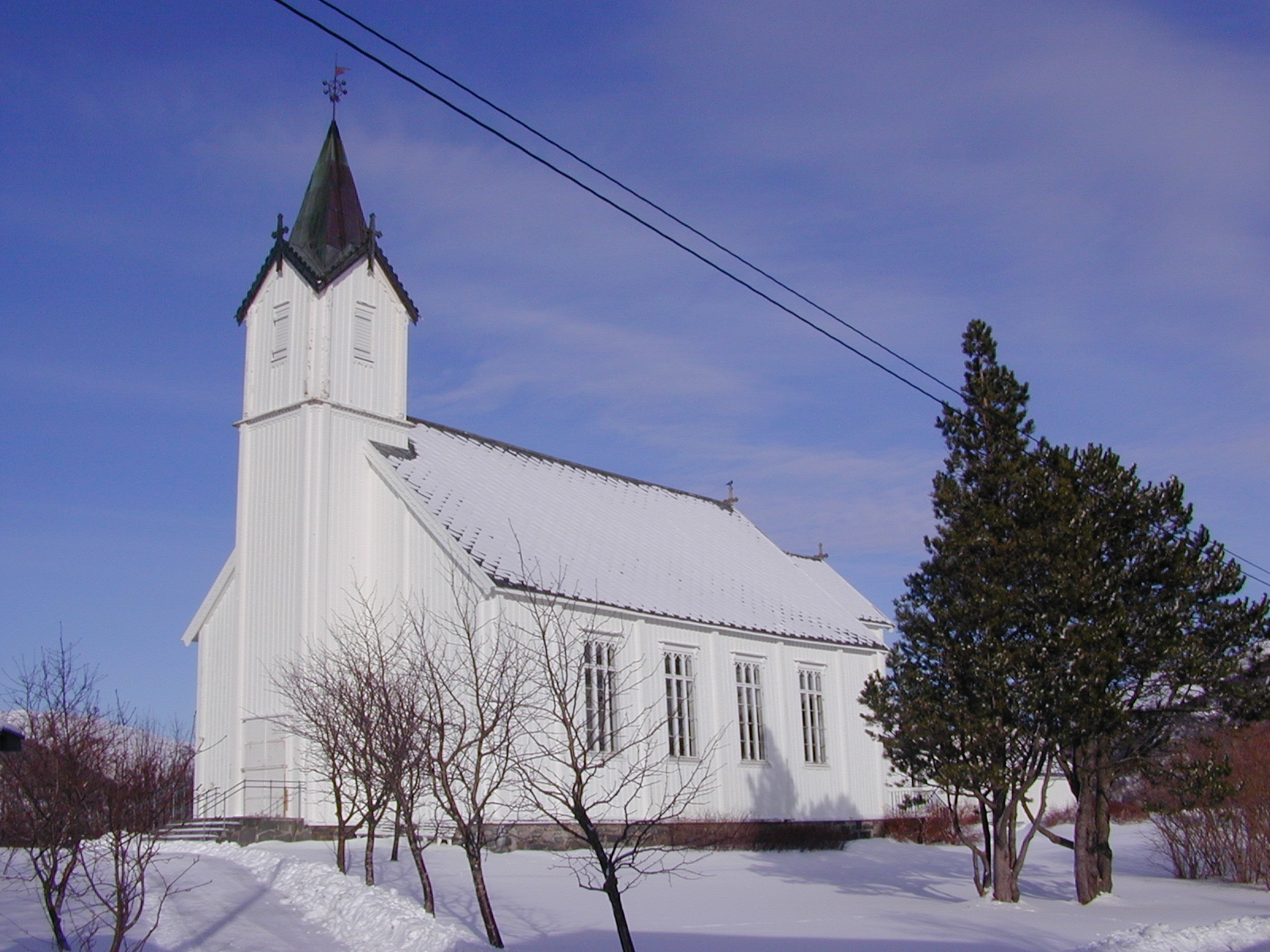
- View of the church
- Osen Church
- 64.29838849°N 10.51444709°E
- Location: Osen Municipality, Trøndelag
- Country: Norway
- Denomination: Church of Norway
- Churchmanship: Evangelical Lutheran

History
- Status: Parish church
- Founded: Middle Ages
- Consecrated: 1877

Architecture
- Functional status: Active
- Architect: Haakon Thorsen
- Architectural type: Long church
- Completed: 1877 (149 years ago)

Specifications
- Capacity: 300
- Materials: Wood

Administration
- Diocese: Nidaros bispedømme
- Deanery: Fosen prosti
- Parish: Osen
- Norwegian Cultural Heritage Site
- Type: Church
- Status: Not protected
- ID: 85248

Osen Church (Norwegian: Osen kirke) is a parish church of the Church of Norway in Osen Municipality in Trøndelag county, Norway. It is located in the village of Osen. It is the church for the Osen parish which is part of the Fosen prosti (deanery) in the Diocese of Nidaros. The white, wooden church was built in a long church style in 1877 using plans drawn up by the architect Haakon Thorsen. The church seats about 300 people.

== History ==
The earliest existing historical records of the church date back to the year 1589, but the church may not have been new that year. The first church in Osen was built in the Middle Ages. Records show that the original church was likely located about 25 metres (82 ft) east of the present church building. In 1645, the old church underwent significant repairs. The historical records of the church are not clear, but there is evidence that a new church was built on the site in 1655 or in 1716, but those are not confirmed. By 1834, the church was in poor condition so planning began for a new church building. In 1837 the church was torn down and replaced with a new church on the same foundation, however, before the building could be completed it was blown over in a large storm so construction had to begin again. The new church was finally completed in 1840. The nave of the new building measured 12.5 by 3.5 metres (41 ft × 11 ft) and it had a chancel measuring 5 by 5 metres (16 ft × 16 ft). The new church soon was deemed to be too small for the congregation and its foundation was not completely stable, so in 1877, a new church was constructed about 25 metres (82 ft) to the west of the old church.

== See also ==
- List of churches in Nidaros
