= Osen Municipality =

Municipality in Trøndelag, Norway

Osen Municipality Osen kommune
- Municipality
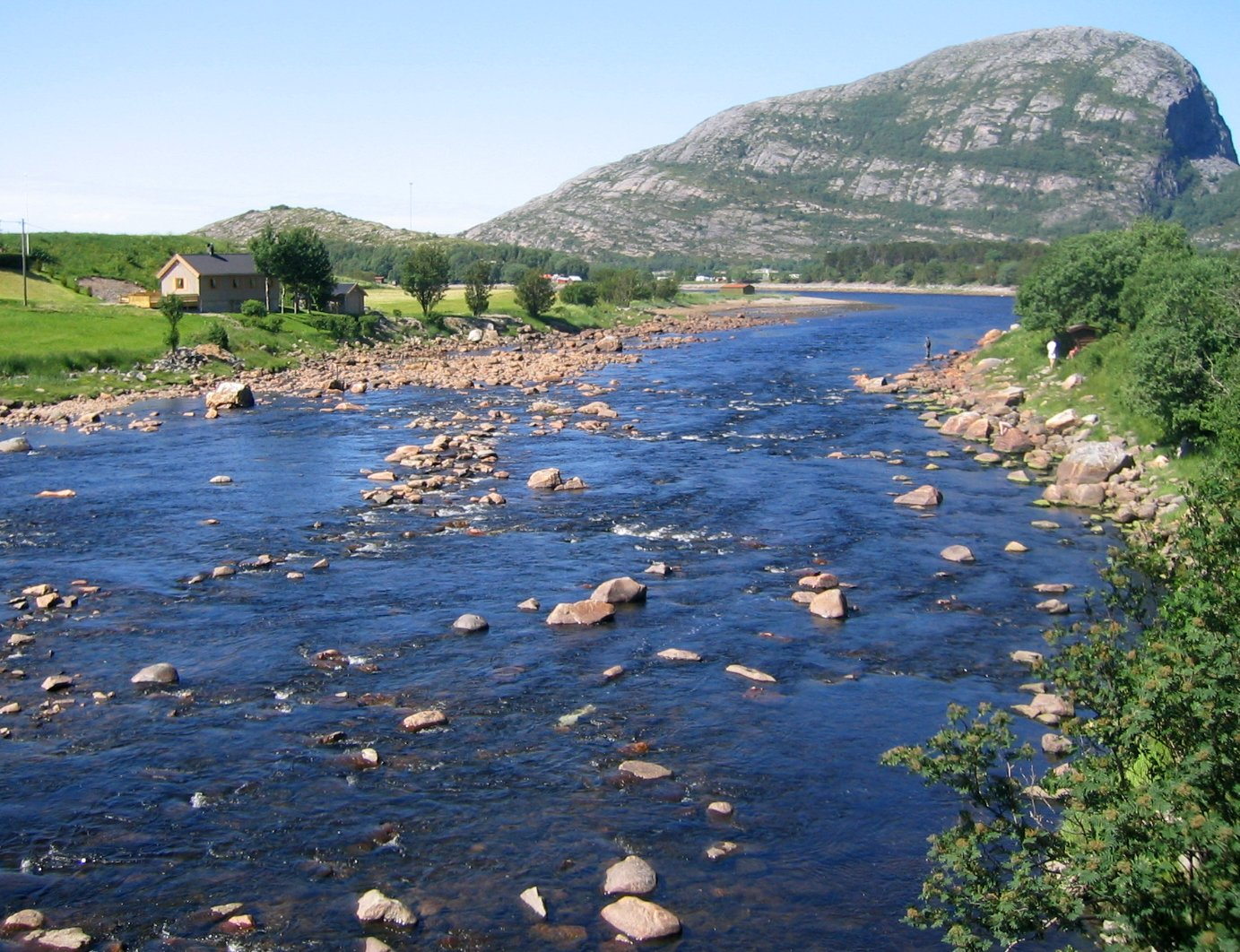
- View of the Osen river

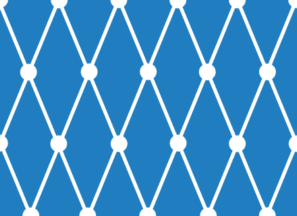
- Flag Coat of arms

- Trøndelag within Norway

- Osen within Trøndelag
- Coordinates: 64°17′52″N 10°30′48″E
- Country: Norway
- County: Trøndelag
- District: Fosen
- Established: 1 June 1892
  - Preceded by: Bjørnør Municipality
- Administrative centre: Osen

Government
  - Mayor (2023): Håvard Strand (LL)

Area
  - Total: 387.10 km^{2} (149.46 sq mi)
  - Land: 369.62 km^{2} (142.71 sq mi)
  - Water: 17.48 km^{2} (6.75 sq mi) 4.5%
  - Rank: #239 in Norway
- Highest elevation: 599.72 m (1,967.6 ft)

Population (2024)
  - Total: 898
  - Rank: #340 in Norway
  - Density: 2.3/km^{2} (6.0/sq mi)
  - Change (10 years): ▼ −9.9%
- Demonym: Osing

Official language
  - Norwegian form: Bokmål
- Time zone: UTC+01:00 (CET)
  - Summer (DST): UTC+02:00 (CEST)
- ISO 3166 code: NO-5020
- Website: Official website

Osen is a municipality in Trøndelag county, Norway. It is part of the Fosen region. The administrative centre of the municipality is the village of Osen. The other main village is Seter. Most residents live in the coastal areas or in the Steinsdalen valley.

The 387-square-kilometre (149 sq mi) municipality is the 239th largest by area out of the 357 municipalities in Norway. Osen Municipality is the 340th most populous municipality in Norway with a population of 898. The municipality's population density is 2.3 inhabitants per square kilometre (6.0/sq mi) and its population has decreased by 9.9% over the previous 10-year period.

== General information ==
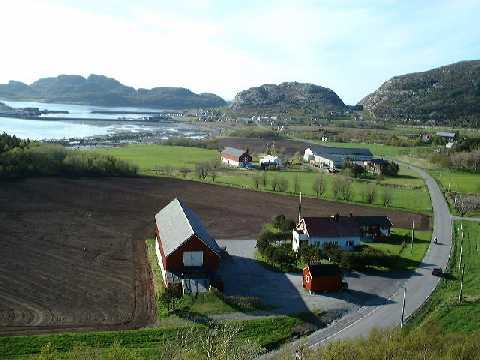
View of Strand

The municipality of Osen was established on 1 June 1892 when the old Bjørnør Municipality was divided into three: Osen Municipality (population: 1,575), Roan Municipality (population: 2,069), and Stoksund Municipality (population: 1,122). The municipal boundaries of Osen have not changed since.

On 1 January 2018, the municipality switched from the old Sør-Trøndelag county to the new Trøndelag county.

=== Name ===
The municipality (originally the parish) is named after the old Osen farm (Old Norse: Óss) since the first Osen Church was built there. The name, óss, means "mouth of a river" (referring to the mouth of the Steinselva river). The suffix -en was added later to give the finite form of óss, giving the meaning of Osen as "the Os" or "the mouth of the river".

=== Coat of arms ===
The coat of arms was granted on 27 March 1987. The official blazon is "Azure, a net argent" (Norwegian: Blått dekket med sølv fiskegarn). This means the arms have a blue field (background) and the charge is part of a fishing net. The fishing net has a tincture of argent which means it is commonly colored white, but if it is made out of metal, then silver is used. The design is based on an old petroglyph and it was chosen to symbolize the importance of fishing for the community. Several different arms were designed, all with fisheries as the main theme, but the council finally chose this one, which is unique among Norwegian civic heraldry. The arms were designed by Einar H. Skjervold. The municipal flag has the same design as the coat of arms.

=== Churches ===
The Church of Norway has one parish (sokn) within Osen Municipality. It is part of the Fosen prosti (deanery) in the Diocese of Nidaros.

Churches in Osen Municipality
Parish (sokn)	Church name	Location of the church	Year built
Osen	Osen Church	Osen	1877
Osen	Seter Chapel	Seter	1969

== History ==
Osen was used as a satellite prison camp during the World War Two, mainly for Yugoslavian population.

== Geography ==
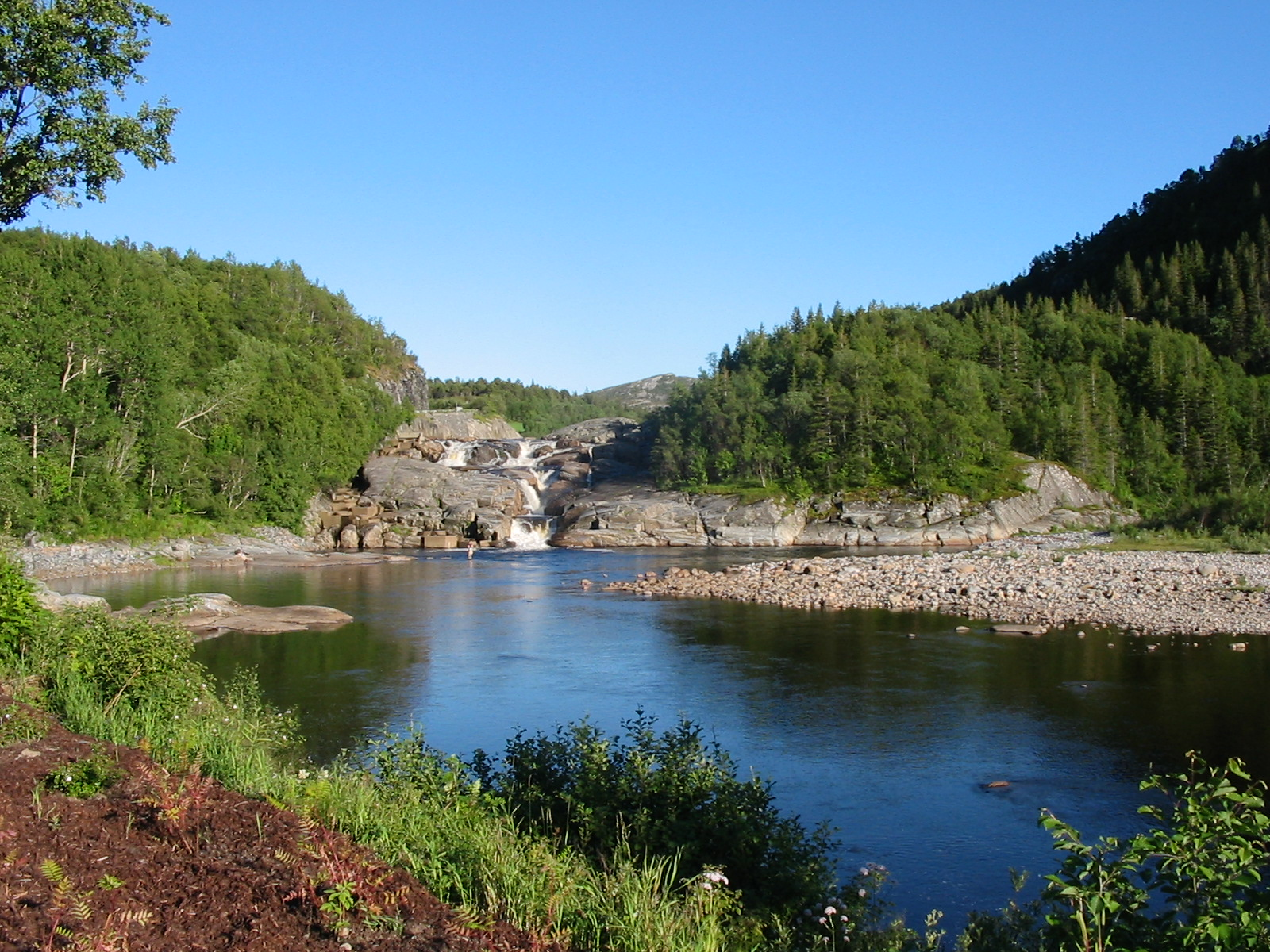
Normeland waterfall

Osen Municipality is located on the Fosen peninsula. The ocean lies to the west, Flatanger Municipality lies to the north, Namsos Municipality lies to the east, and Åfjord Municipality lies to the south. The highest point in the municipality is the 599.72-metre (1,967.6 ft) tall mountain Storheia, located on the border with Namsos Municipality.

Most of the residents live in the Steinsdalen valley or along the coast. The northern part of the municipality has no direct road connection to the rest of the municipality, but is connected Flatanger Municipality to the north.

The Kya lighthouse is situated on a small island west in the Norwegian Sea, while Buholmråsa lighthouse lie on an island along the coast in the western part of the municipality.

=== Climate ===
The Norwegian Meteorological Institute has a weather station located near the Buholmråsa lighthouse, with recording since 1965, showing a marine west coast climate/oceanic climate (Cfb). The all-time high temperature is 31.3 °C (88.3 °F) recorded 14 July 2025; the all-time low is −20.7 °C (−5.3 °F) recorded in February 1966. The four months June - September have never recorded overnight freezes. The average date for the first overnight freeze (below 0 °C (32 °F)) in autumn is November 7 (1981-2020 average). The driest month on record is January 1972 with 5.4 mm precipitation, and the wettest is September 1975 with 232.6 mm.

Climate data for Buholmråsa 1991-2020 (precipitation 1961-90, extremes 1965-2025)
Month	Jan	Feb	Mar	Apr	May	Jun	Jul	Aug	Sep	Oct	Nov	Dec	Year
Record high °C (°F)	12.4 (54.3)	10.9 (51.6)	12.6 (54.7)	20.9 (69.6)	26.5 (79.7)	28.5 (83.3)	31.3 (88.3)	27.4 (81.3)	24.9 (76.8)	19.8 (67.6)	16.1 (61.0)	12.5 (54.5)	31.3 (88.3)
Mean daily maximum °C (°F)	3.7 (38.7)	3.5 (38.3)	4.7 (40.5)	7.8 (46.0)	11.2 (52.2)	13.6 (56.5)	16.4 (61.5)	16.6 (61.9)	14.2 (57.6)	9.7 (49.5)	6.8 (44.2)	5 (41)	9.4 (49.0)
Daily mean °C (°F)	2 (36)	1.4 (34.5)	2.5 (36.5)	5.2 (41.4)	8.2 (46.8)	11 (52)	13.5 (56.3)	14.1 (57.4)	11.9 (53.4)	7.9 (46.2)	4.8 (40.6)	3 (37)	7.1 (44.8)
Mean daily minimum °C (°F)	0 (32)	−0.2 (31.6)	0.3 (32.5)	3.3 (37.9)	6.3 (43.3)	9.3 (48.7)	11.8 (53.2)	12.2 (54.0)	10.1 (50.2)	6 (43)	3.1 (37.6)	1.2 (34.2)	5.3 (41.5)
Record low °C (°F)	−18 (0)	−20.7 (−5.3)	−12.5 (9.5)	−6.2 (20.8)	−1.7 (28.9)	2.1 (35.8)	5.5 (41.9)	5 (41)	0 (32)	−5.2 (22.6)	−10.2 (13.6)	−15.5 (4.1)	−20.7 (−5.3)
Average precipitation mm (inches)	79 (3.1)	64 (2.5)	61 (2.4)	56 (2.2)	43 (1.7)	49 (1.9)	65 (2.6)	71 (2.8)	100 (3.9)	106 (4.2)	86 (3.4)	90 (3.5)	870 (34.3)
Source 1: Norwegian Meteorological Institute
Source 2: NOAA / WMO averages 91-2020 Norway

== Government ==
Osen Municipality is responsible for primary education (through 10th grade), outpatient health services, senior citizen services, welfare and other social services, zoning, economic development, and municipal roads and utilities. The municipality is governed by a municipal council of directly elected representatives. The mayor is indirectly elected by a vote of the municipal council. The municipality is under the jurisdiction of the Trøndelag District Court and the Frostating Court of Appeal.

Municipal waste management has since 1995 been handled by the inter-municipal Midtre Namdal Avfallsselskap, with ReTrans Midt handling waste collection since 2018.

=== Municipal council ===
The municipal council (Kommunestyre) of Osen Municipality is made up of 15 representatives that are elected to four year terms. The tables below show the current and historical composition of the council by political party.

Osen kommunestyre 2023–2027
Party name (in Norwegian)	Number of representatives
Labour Party (Arbeiderpartiet)	3
Progress Party (Fremskrittspartiet)	1
Centre Party (Senterpartiet)	4
Liberal Party (Venstre)	1
Local list for Osen municipality (Bygdeliste for hele Osen kommune)	5
Seter Community List (Seter kretsliste)	1
Total number of members:	15

Osen kommunestyre 2019–2023
Party name (in Norwegian)	Number of representatives
Labour Party (Arbeiderpartiet)	8
Centre Party (Senterpartiet)	3
Joint list of the Liberal Party (Venstre) and Christian Democratic Party (Kristelig Folkeparti)	3
Seter Community List (Seter kretsliste)	1
Total number of members:	15

Osen kommunestyre 2015–2019
Party name (in Norwegian)	Number of representatives
Labour Party (Arbeiderpartiet)	5
Progress Party (Fremskrittspartiet)	1
Conservative Party (Høyre)	1
Centre Party (Senterpartiet)	3
Joint list of the Liberal Party (Venstre) and Christian Democratic Party (Kristelig Folkeparti)	4
Seter Community List (Seter kretsliste)	1
Total number of members:	15

Osen kommunestyre 2011–2015
Party name (in Norwegian)	Number of representatives
Labour Party (Arbeiderpartiet)	4
Progress Party (Fremskrittspartiet)	1
Centre Party (Senterpartiet)	2
Joint list of the Liberal Party (Venstre) and Christian Democratic Party (Kristelig Folkeparti)	5
Local List(s) (Lokale lister)	1
Seter Community List (Seter kretsliste)	2
Total number of members:	15

Osen kommunestyre 2007–2011
Party name (in Norwegian)	Number of representatives
Labour Party (Arbeiderpartiet)	3
Progress Party (Fremskrittspartiet)	2
Conservative Party (Høyre)	1
Centre Party (Senterpartiet)	2
Socialist Left Party (Sosialistisk Venstreparti)	2
Non-party local list (Upolitisk bygdaliste)	3
Election list for the Seter and Angen area (Valgliste for Seter og Angen krets)	2
Total number of members:	15

Osen kommunestyre 2003–2007
Party name (in Norwegian)	Number of representatives
Labour Party (Arbeiderpartiet)	5
Conservative Party (Høyre)	2
Christian Democratic Party (Kristelig Folkeparti)	3
Centre Party (Senterpartiet)	3
Socialist Left Party (Sosialistisk Venstreparti)	2
Election list for the Seter and Angen area (Valgliste for Seter og Angen krets)	2
Total number of members:	17

Osen kommunestyre 1999–2003
Party name (in Norwegian)	Number of representatives
Labour Party (Arbeiderpartiet)	7
Conservative Party (Høyre)	1
Christian Democratic Party (Kristelig Folkeparti)	2
Centre Party (Senterpartiet)	4
Socialist Left Party (Sosialistisk Venstreparti)	1
Seter Community list (Seter kretsliste)	2
Total number of members:	17

Osen kommunestyre 1995–1999
Party name (in Norwegian)	Number of representatives
Labour Party (Arbeiderpartiet)	5
Conservative Party (Høyre)	1
Christian Democratic Party (Kristelig Folkeparti)	2
Centre Party (Senterpartiet)	5
Socialist Left Party (Sosialistisk Venstreparti)	1
Liberal Party (Venstre)	1
Election list for Seter (Valgliste for Sæter)	2
Total number of members:	17

Osen kommunestyre 1991–1995
Party name (in Norwegian)	Number of representatives
Labour Party (Arbeiderpartiet)	3
Conservative Party (Høyre)	1
Christian Democratic Party (Kristelig Folkeparti)	2
Centre Party (Senterpartiet)	4
Socialist Left Party (Sosialistisk Venstreparti)	2
Liberal Party (Venstre)	3
Election list for the Sæter and Angen area (Valgliste for Sæter og Angen krets)	2
Total number of members:	17

Osen kommunestyre 1987–1991
Party name (in Norwegian)	Number of representatives
Labour Party (Arbeiderpartiet)	7
Conservative Party (Høyre)	2
Christian Democratic Party (Kristelig Folkeparti)	2
Centre Party (Senterpartiet)	3
Election list for the Seter area (Valgliste for Seter krets)	2
Village list for the Vingsand area (Kretsliste for Vingsand og omegn)	1
Total number of members:	17

Osen kommunestyre 1983–1987
Party name (in Norwegian)	Number of representatives
Labour Party (Arbeiderpartiet)	6
Conservative Party (Høyre)	2
Christian Democratic Party (Kristelig Folkeparti)	2
Centre Party (Senterpartiet)	2
Liberal Party (Venstre)	2
Election list for the Seter area (Valgliste for Seter krets)	2
Village list for the Vingsand area (Kretsliste for Vingsand og omegn)	1
Total number of members:	17

Osen kommunestyre 1979–1983
Party name (in Norwegian)	Number of representatives
Labour Party (Arbeiderpartiet)	4
Conservative Party (Høyre)	3
Christian Democratic Party (Kristelig Folkeparti)	2
Centre Party (Senterpartiet)	3
Liberal Party (Venstre)	1
Local list for Sæter and Svefjorden (Kretsliste for Sæter og Svefjorden)	1
Local list for the Vingsand area (Kretsliste for Vingsand og omegn)	1
Non-party list for the Strand area (Upolitisk liste for Strand og omegn)	1
Local list for Skjærvøya (Kretsliste for Skjærvøya)	1
Total number of members:	17

Osen kommunestyre 1975–1979
Party name (in Norwegian)	Number of representatives
Labour Party (Arbeiderpartiet)	5
Christian Democratic Party (Kristelig Folkeparti)	1
Centre Party (Senterpartiet)	4
Liberal Party (Venstre)	1
Local list for Sæter and Svefjorden (Kretsliste for Sæter og Svefjorden)	3
Local list for the Vingsand area (Kretsliste for Vingsand og omegn)	1
Non-party list for the Strand area (Upolitisk liste for Strand og omegn)	1
Local list for Skjærvøy (Kretsliste for Skjærvøy)	1
Total number of members:	17

Osen kommunestyre 1971–1975
Party name (in Norwegian)	Number of representatives
Labour Party (Arbeiderpartiet)	4
Centre Party (Senterpartiet)	3
Joint List(s) of Non-Socialist Parties (Borgerlige Felleslister)	2
Local List(s) (Lokale lister)	8
Total number of members:	17

Osen kommunestyre 1967–1971
Party name (in Norwegian)	Number of representatives
Labour Party (Arbeiderpartiet)	5
Centre Party (Senterpartiet)	3
Liberal Party (Venstre)	1
Local List(s) (Lokale lister)	8
Total number of members:	17

Osen kommunestyre 1963–1967
Party name (in Norwegian)	Number of representatives
Labour Party (Arbeiderpartiet)	3
Joint List(s) of Non-Socialist Parties (Borgerlige Felleslister)	4
Local List(s) (Lokale lister)	10
Total number of members:	17

Osen herredsstyre 1959–1963
Party name (in Norwegian)	Number of representatives
Labour Party (Arbeiderpartiet)	3
Joint List(s) of Non-Socialist Parties (Borgerlige Felleslister)	2
Local List(s) (Lokale lister)	12
Total number of members:	17

Osen herredsstyre 1955–1959
Party name (in Norwegian)	Number of representatives
Labour Party (Arbeiderpartiet)	3
Local List(s) (Lokale lister)	14
Total number of members:	17

Osen herredsstyre 1951–1955
Party name (in Norwegian)	Number of representatives
Labour Party (Arbeiderpartiet)	3
Local List(s) (Lokale lister)	13
Total number of members:	16

Osen herredsstyre 1947–1951
Party name (in Norwegian)	Number of representatives
Labour Party (Arbeiderpartiet)	2
Liberal Party (Venstre)	5
Local List(s) (Lokale lister)	9
Total number of members:	16

Osen herredsstyre 1945–1947
Party name (in Norwegian)	Number of representatives
Labour Party (Arbeiderpartiet)	4
Communist Party (Kommunistiske Parti)	1
Local List(s) (Lokale lister)	11
Total number of members:	16

Osen herredsstyre 1937–1941*
Party name (in Norwegian)	Number of representatives
Labour Party (Arbeiderpartiet)	3
Local List(s) (Lokale lister)	13
Total number of members:	16
Note: Due to the German occupation of Norway during World War II, no elections were held for new municipal councils until after the war ended in 1945.

=== Mayors ===
The mayor (Norwegian: ordfører) of Osen Municipality is the political leader of the municipality and the chairperson of the municipal council. Here is a list of people who have held this position:

- 1892–1893: Johan Moses Møller (H)
- 1894–1895: Sivert Kolstad (V)
- 1896–1901: Johan Moses Møller (H)
- 1902–1913: Sivert Kolstad (V)
- 1913–1914: Joakim Brusdal (V)
- 1914–1916: Johan Sundet (V)
- 1916–1916: Johan J. Vingsand
- 1917–1922: Morten L. Osen
- 1923–1934: Jakob Hopen (V)
- 1935–1941: Svein Osen (V)
- 1942–1945: Magnus Sundet
- 1945–1947: Svein Osen (V)
- 1948–1955: Marius Sæther (Ap)
- 1956–1957: Fredrik Brattgjerd (Ap)
- 1958–1963: Lars Nesmo (Sp)
- 1964–1967: Morten Johannessen (Sp)
- 1968–1971: Harald Hanssen (V)
- 1972–1975: Ingar Nilssen (KrF)
- 1976–1979: Vidar Sætran (Ap)
- 1980–1983: Tormod Storvoll (Sp)
- 1984–1985: Einar Hepsø (Ap)
- 1985–1991: Asbjørn Teigen (Ap)
- 1992–1995: Bjarne Hestmo (Sp)
- 1995–2003: Einar Hepsø (Ap)
- 2003–2007: Julla Engan (Ap)
- 2007–2015: Jørn Nordmeland (V)
- 2015–2023: John Einar Høvik (Ap)
- 2023–present: Håvard Strand (LL)

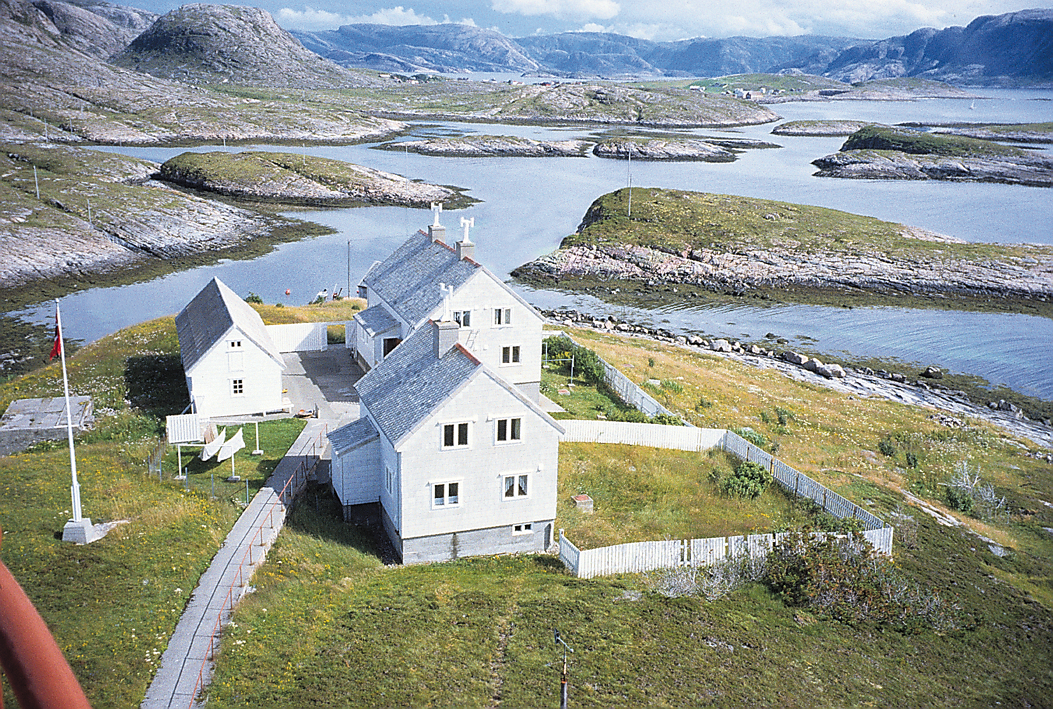
View from tower of Buholmråsa lighthouse at the coast

== Notable people ==
- Augusta Aasen (1878 in Osen – 1920), a Norwegian politician who was buried in the Kremlin Wall Necropolis (the only Norwegian woman buried there)
- Einar Hepsø (1926–2005), a Norwegian fishers' leader and politician who was Mayor of Osen 1984-1985 and 1995-2003
- Vivian Sørmeland (born 1985 in Osen), a contestant in Idol (Norway) in May 2006

== See also ==
- Prison camps in North Norway during World War Two, including at Osen
