= Levanger–Hokstad Ferry =

Ferry route in Trøndelag, Norway

Levanger–Hokstad Ytterøy Ferry
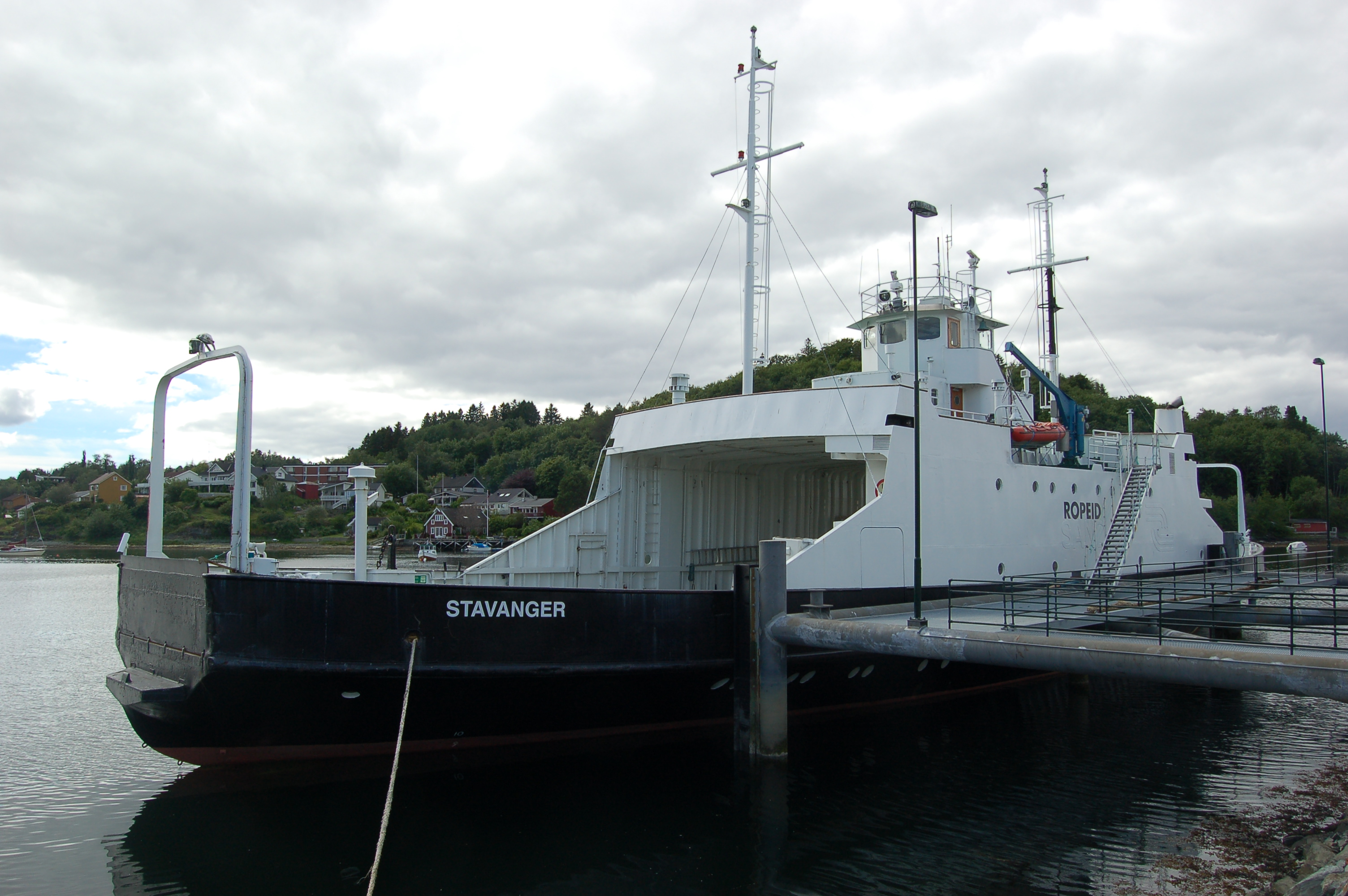
- Waterway: Trondheimsfjord
- Transit type: Double-ended
- Route: Norwegian County Road 774
- Carries: Automobiles and passengers
- Terminals: Levanger; Hokstad
- Operator: Tide Sjø
- Authority: Norwegian Public Roads Administration
- Began operation: 1958
- Travel time: 30 min
- Frequency: 11 / day
- No. of vessels: MF Ytterøyningen
- Daily ridership: 235 (2007)
- Daily vehicles: 140 (2007)
- Connections at Levanger
- Train: Levanger Station
- Bus: TrønderBilene
- Road: Fv774

The Levanger–Hokstad Ferry is an automobile ferry on Norwegian County Road 774 that connects the island of Ytterøya to the town of Levanger on the mainland of Levanger Municipality in Trøndelag county, Norway. The 9.0-kilometre (5.6 mi) long passage on Trondheimsfjord is performed with the double-ended ferries MF Yttringen and operated by Tide Sjø making 11 crossings in each direction each day taking 30 minutes. In 2007, the line had a daily ridership of 235 people and 140 vehicles.

== History ==
Automobile ferry transport in Innherred started in 1958 when the company Innherredsferja started the route Levanger–Hokstad–Vangshylla–Kjerringvik–Venneshamn; connecting Levanger to the island of Ytterøya, and onwards connecting Inderøy Municipality with Mosvik Municipality (this second leg of the ferry was discontinued after the Skarnsund Bridge was completed in 1991). In 1964, a new road between Kjerringvik and Venneshamn opened, and at the same time a second ferry was purchased, allowing two routes to be established, the Levanger–Hokstad Ferry and the Vangshylla–Kjerringvik Ferry.

In 2005, the ferry line was made subject to public service obligation in a package with the Brekstad–Valset route. In preparation for the competition Innherredsferja was bought by Fosen Trafikklag, but fail to succeed at the contract, losing it to Nor-Ferjer who took over the line as of 1 January 2007. Nor-Ferjer merged to form Tide Sjø in 2007. The ferry MF Ropeid is docked at Levanger as a reserve ferry for both routes.
