= Innherredsferja =

Norwegian ferry operator

Innherredsferja AS
- Industry: Ferry transport
- Founded: 10 May 1957
- Defunct: 31 December 2006
- Fate: Lost PSO contract
- Successor: Tide
- Headquarters: Levanger, Norway
- Parent: Fosen Trafikklag

Innherredsferja AS (lit. 'The Innherred Ferry') was a Norwegian ferry operator in the Trondheimsfjord in Nord-Trøndelag county based in Levanger. It operated the Levanger–Hokstad Ferry between Levanger and the island of Ytterøya, and the Vangshylla–Kjerringvik Ferry between Inderøy Municipality and Mosvik Municipality. The company operated seven ferries through its history, and had up to three operating at any time, including one in reserve.

Founded in 1957, the company started a service between Venneshamn, Kjerringvik, Vangshylla, Hokstad, and Levanger. The initial owners of the company were a mixture of municipalities, the county, and private individuals and companies. In 1964, the company's operations were split into two services, each with a single crossing. Following the opening of the Skarnsund Bridge in 1991, the Vangshylla–Kjerringvik Ferry was terminated. In 2005, the company was taken over by Fosen Trafikklag, after the state decided that the route would be subject to public service obligation. The company lost the bid to Nor-Ferjer, and operation ceased at the end of 2006.

== History ==
=== Establishment ===
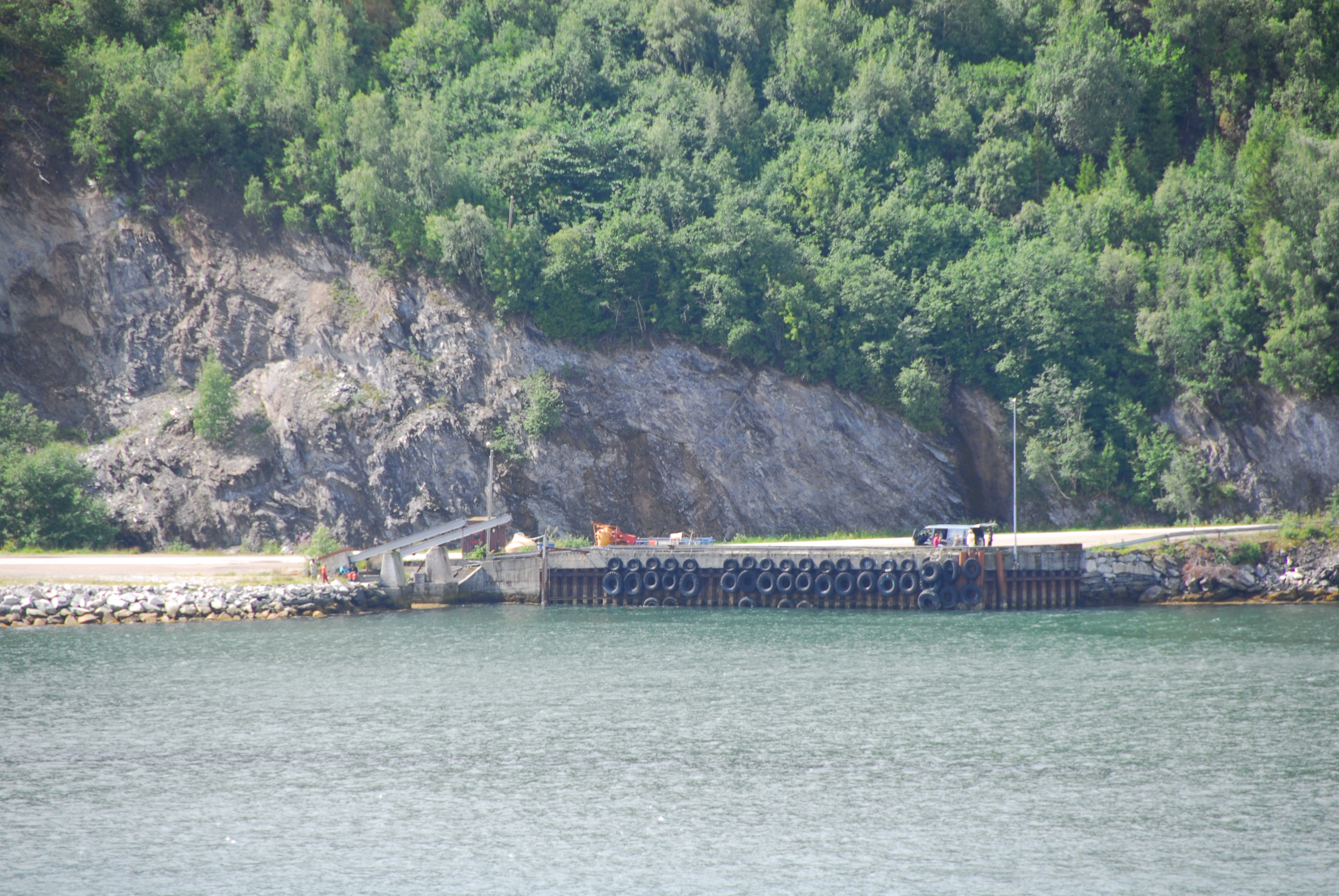
The quay at Kjerringvik has been closed since 1991

The initiative for a cross-fjord ferry service was taken by Arthur Selvig, leader of the merchants' association in Levanger. In January 1955, he invited members of the municipal councils on both sides of the fjord to establish a company. The meeting was held in Levanger, and the representatives from Mosvik took two days to get to the meeting. An interim committee was appointed, which was to cooperate with Innherreds Aktie Dampskibsselskab to persuade them not purchase a new ship, and also to consider purchasing a combined car- and cargo-ferry, or alternatively a conventional vessel. At the time, National Road 755 between Mosvik Municipality and Leksvik Municipality was being constructed and would be completed by the end of the decade; however, it would take longer before Mosvik would be connected to Venneshamn. The committee suggested that the route Venneshamn–Kjerringvik–Vangshylla–Ytterøy–Levanger be established. The municipal council of Ytterøy Municipality voted to place the ferry quay at Hokstad, which was serving as the municipal center.

State funding of 105,000 kr was granted to build ferry quays at Hokstad, Levanger and Venneshamn. The committee decided that they wanted a ferry similar to one delivered by Moen & Sønns Båtbyggeri which was at the time stationed in Trondheim, costing NOK 450,000. To finance this, state guarantees for the load and deficits needed to be granted. The Ministry of Transport and Communications promised to grant partial guarantees if local guarantees were also issued. Sale of shares started in 1957, and the municipalities of Inderøy, Mosvik, Verran and Levanger bought shares, as well as guaranteeing 20% of the deficits. Nord-Trøndelag County Municipality bought shares, but did not want to issue guarantees. Innherredsferja was established with a share capital of NOK 144,000, split between 288 shares. The county bought 100 and became the largest owner, while seven municipalities bought 90 between them. The remaining shares were owned by private individuals and local companies. The company was incorporated on 10 May 1957.

Maps of the cross-fjord route operated from 1958 to 1964. The map shows the modern roads

NOK 400,000 was borrowed and NOK 510,000 invested in a ferry from Moen & Sønns. It arrived at Levanger on 31 December 1957 and was named Innherredsferja. Initial plans were to have a crew of three on the ferry, but this was quickly expanded to five. The single-direction vessel had space for 75 passengers plus vehicles. During the test-run it became clear that the quay at Vangshylla was 75 centimetres (30 in) too narrow to allow the ferry to dock. The first ferry service had ten different route combinations in each direction, and the fees were based on three different zones. Trips within Mosvik, Verran and Inderøy were in Zone 1, trips to and from Ytterøy were in Zone 2, while trips from Levanger to Mosvik and Inderøy were within Zone 3. The initial prices were NOK 1 for one person in Zone 1, NOK 2.50 in Zone 2 and NOK 3.5 in Zone 3. For cars, the prices were NOK 5, 10 and 14, respectively. On workdays, the ferry made two round trips to Ytterøy and Levanger, three round trips to Venneshamn and five round trips to Vangshylla and Kjerringvik. At Levanger, both ferries corresponded with north- and southbound trains on the Nordland Line at Levanger Station, which is within walking distance of the quay. At Vangshylla, there were buses operated by Fylkesbilene i Nord-Trøndelag to Steinkjer Municipality and Røra Station.

Operations commenced on 1 February 1958. After five days, the service had to stop because of technical problems with the engine, and it took a week before it resumed. The quay at Levanger was not suitable, because the ferry could not dock at low tide. This caused the ferry to dock at the main dock to disembark passengers, whilst unloading the vehicles had to wait until high tide. In the first twelve months of operation, the ferry transported 9,411 vehicles, of which 4,000 were cars, and 40,000 passengers. By 1961, the number of cars had increased to 9,374. During 1958, the company employed ticket sellers at the quays. A new ferry, Innherredsferja II, was ordered from Ulstein Mekaniske Verksted, and entered service on 1 August 1962. The 27 metres (89 ft) long vessel cost NOK 1,062,000. It had a capacity for sixteen cars or six trucks. Part of the rationale for purchasing the new ferry was the increased traffic across Skarnsund following the completion of National Road 755 from Mosvik to Leksvik, which made the ferry the fastest link for people from Leksvik traveling to Levanger.

=== Two routes ===
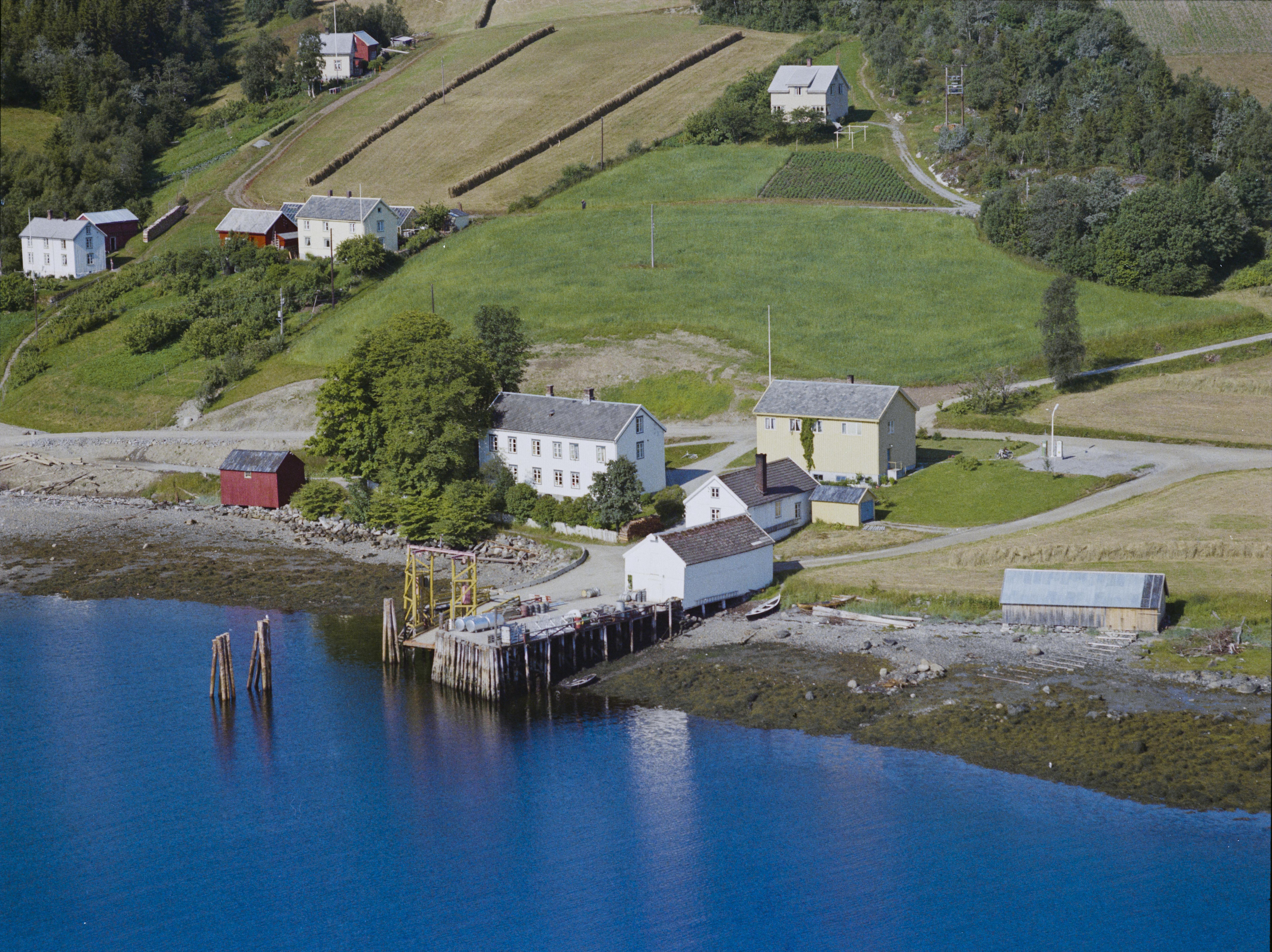
Venneshamn was served by the ferry from 1958 to 1968

Discussion about splitting the route into two started in the early 1960s. The Public Roads Administration felt that it was unnecessary to have a cross-fjord service, as at the time there was a road from Vangshylla to Levanger which sufficed. The administration was also in the process of building a road from Kjerringvik to Venneshamn, which would allow the ferry to drop that service. On 1 June 1964, the service was split in two: Vangshylla–Kjerringvik and Hokstad–Levanger. At the same time, the service was upgraded to a national road connection, and the full responsibility for funding was transferred to the ministry. The Vangshylla–Kjerringvik service was taken over by Innherredsferja, while the Hokstad–Levanger service was taken over by Innherredsferja II. In 1968, the state granted sufficient guarantees to allow a new ferry to be purchased. In the same year, the road from Framverran via Venneshamn to Kjerringvik was opened. The new ferry was similar to Innherredsferja II; it was built in Kristiansund for NOK 1,555,000 and originally named Skarnsund. Innherredsferja was sold to an operator in Agder for NOK 50,000. At the same time, Fremverran and Venneshamn were transferred from the municipality of Verran to Mosvik, while Ytterøy, Skogn and Frol merged with Levanger.

In 1970, the ferries were equipped with televisions. The following year, the company had a deficit of NOK 1.1 million. It transported 195,000 passengers, of which 120,000 took the Vangshylla–Kjerringvik service. Mobile telephones came into use in January 1972. In 1973, the service was reduced as a result of the oil crisis, which lasted until 1 March 1974. Smoking indoors was banned from 1975, and a new quay was built in Levanger and opened on 1 July 1976. Local disagreement about the location of a new quay on Ytterøy delayed construction, and it did not open until 1981. In 1974, planning for a new ferry on the Ytterøy service started, although the order was not placed until June 1979. The new ferry, Ytterøy, cost NOK 10.5 million, had space for 30 cars and was bi-directional. It was put into service in February 1981. Innherredsferja II was kept as a reserve.

The need for a larger ferry on the Skarnsund service was also pressing. Cars often had to wait, and if the ferry sailed with full capacity, there was no room for passengers to leave their vehicles. Work to procure a new ferry to replace Skarnsund started in 1981. This resulted in the acquisition of the second-hand ferry Mosvik from Bergen, with a capacity of 24 cars, which entered service starting 9 December 1982. Skarnsund was leased to Namsos Trafikkselskap. In 1982, tickets for a single trip on the Skarnsund Ferry were NOK 5 for an adult and NOK 14 for a car with driver. On the Ytterøy service, it was NOK 7 and 25, respectively. Discounts were available, up to 33% for cars and 50% for trucks and buses.

=== New times at Skarnsund ===
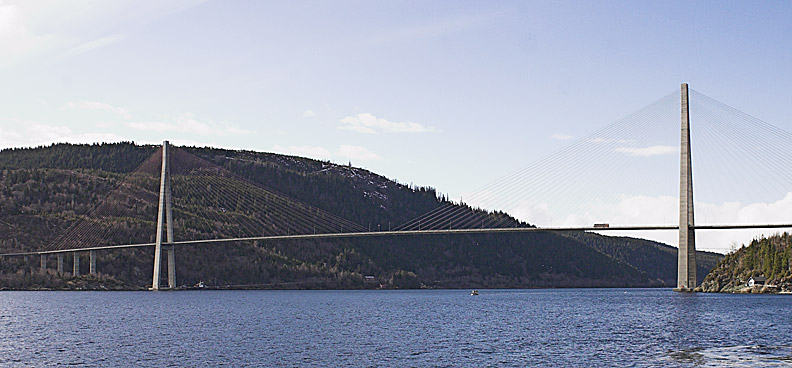
The Vangshylla–Kjerringvik Ferry was terminated in 1991 following the opening of the Skarnsund Bridge

Mosvik proved to be too small, with 3,000 cars being left at the quays at Vangshylla and Kjerringvik in 1986. An additional 47 were not catered for on the Ytterøy service in the same year. The order for Skarnsund II, costing NOK 27 million, was signed in December 1987, and put into service in 1988. Skarnsund was sold to Namsos Trafikkselskap for NOK 1, as was Mosvik for NOK 1 million. The following year, Verran Municipality sold its shares in the company. In 1990, the subsidy system was changed, and the company received a fixed subsidy instead of the state covering the deficit. This allowed the company to make a profit, if it managed to rationalize operations.

The first meeting of local commercial and political interests to establish a bridge across Skarnsund was held in 1972. By 1983, it was formalized by the establishment of the company AS Skarnsundsbrua to finance construction. The Parliament of Norway passed the plans in 1986, and construction started two years later. The bridge cost NOK 200 million, and was opened by King Harald V on 19 December 1991, after he had taken the last ferry across the fjord.

In 1991, Fosen Trafikklag purchased Inderøy Municipality's shares in Innherredferja, while Verran Sparebank bought those previously owned by Mosvik Municipality. In its last year of operation, the Skarnsund service carried 267,894 people, 108,482 cars, 13,878 trucks, 840 buses and 312 motorcycles. Skarnsund II was sold to Namsos Trafikkselskap for NOK 23,357,778. In 1992, the annual meeting had to be postponed due to a ferry strike, which prevented the shareholders from Ytterøy attending. Levanger Municipality and Nord-Trøndelag County Municipality were the only remaining public shareholders, and in 1992 Levanger announced that they intended to sell the Trondheim-based ferry operator Fosen Trafikklag. However, the politicians changed their mind, and the municipality remained as a shareholder. In 1994, both ferries were out of service and a small passenger ferry was used for a few days. In 1996, the company was again hit by a strike. Normally the service was not chosen to be subject to strikes due to the high regularity needed by the chicken manufacturer Trønderkylling, who would otherwise have to proceed with unnecessary slaughtering of animals. In 1997, a cooperation with Fosen Trafikklag started, including the two using a shared reserve ferry, Austråt.

=== Cooperation and competition ===
In 2000, Innherredsferja started to work on proposals to purchase a new ferry. The following year, it chose to buy Torghatten for NOK 19.2 million from Torghatten Trafikkselskap, and renamed it Ytterøy II. It was taken into service on 9 November 2002, andInnherredsferja II was sold. At the same time, Innherredsferja and Fosen Trafikklag amended their agreement, whereby Ytterøy, stationed at Levanger, became the shared reserve ferry. This meant that if a reserve vessel was needed for the Flakk–Rørvik Ferry, Ytterøy II would be sent there, and Ytterøy used for the Levanger–Hokstad service. From 1 January 2003, the Levanger–Hokstad Ferry was one of six services which were part of a national test project where the fees for cars were increased, while passengers traveled free. The project included larger discounts for large users. The scheme was terminated in 2006. A new ferry quay at Levanger was opened in 2003, with a larger waiting area and ramp. The ramp also had separate sections for walk-on passengers and cars. A terminal building was built with a waiting room and toilets, as well as offices for Innherredsferja. The terminal was 160 square metres (1,700 sq ft) in two stories and cost NOK 1.8 million. From the ground, the building was built to symbolize a lighthouse, while from above it appears shaped like a fish.

In 2004, Bondevik's Second Cabinet and Liberal Minister of Transport Torild Skogsholm decided that all ferry services in Norway would become subject to public service obligation (PSO). Innherredsferja held a concession until the end of 2006, but would have to bid for the service from 1 January 2007. The company would need expertise in both bidding and increased share capital to succeed in the bidding. By then, Fosen Trafikklag had bought 25% of the company, and the county and the municipality sold their shares to Fosen. Following this, a meeting was held on Ytterøy, where Fosen succeeded in securing a sufficient number of shares from the private owners to purchase the entire company. This valued the company at NOK 23.1 million. Private owners were given the option to be paid in Fosen shares. From 1 July 2005, Innherredsferja was made a subsidiary of Fosen, but the company remained a separate limited company with its own board.

The Ytterøy service was packaged with the Brekstad–Valset Ferry—located further out in the fjord than the Flakk–Rørvik Ferry. In the initial contract proposal from the Public Roads Administration, it was considered acceptable that Ytterøy could be without a ferry service for up to 24 hours, should there be technical difficulties with the vessel. After massive local protests—arguing that Brekstad residents had the option to take the Flakk–Rørvik Ferry—the Ytterøy this delay was reduced to 2 hours and it was specified that the reserve ferry had to be stationed at Levanger. In 2005, the Public Roads Administration declared that Nor-Ferjer, a joint venture between Stavangerske and Hardanger Sunnhordlandske Dampskipsselskap had won the bid. Innherredsferja continued to operate until their concession ran out, after which Ytterøy II and the terminal in Levanger were sold. All but three of the employees received jobs with Nor-Ferjer. Until 2008, Innherredsferja remained a paper company until the sale of Ytterøy was completed and liquidation completed. The company never had any serious accidents during its history.

== Services ==
=== Cross-fjord ===
The cross-fjord route was in service from 1958 to 1964. It connected the three sea-locked communities of Venneshamn, Mosvik and Ytterøy to the mainland at Inderøy and Levanger. On workdays, the ferry made two round trips to Ytterøy and Levanger, three round trips to Venneshamn and five round trips to Vangshylla and Kjerringvik.

=== Skarnsund ===
The Vangshylla–Kjerringvik Ferry connected the municipalities of Inderøy and Mosvik across the sound Skarnsund, at the narrowest point of the Trondheimsfjord. The route operated from 1 June 1964 to 19 December 1991, when it was replaced by the Skarnsund Bridge. It was part of Norwegian National Road 755. The ferry had hourly services in each direction through most of the day, and the crossing took seven minutes.

=== Ytterøy ===
The Levanger–Hokstad Ferry connects the mainland at Levanger with the island of Ytterøya at Hokstad. The service has operated since 1 June 1964, as part of Norwegian National Road 774. The ferry has up to eleven daily round trips, with the crossing taking 30 minutes on the 9 kilometres (5.6 mi) stretch. Since 2007, the service has been operated by Nor-Ferjer (which later merged to become part of Tide Sjø).

== Fleet ==
- MF Innherredsferja was the company's first vessel. She was a single-direction vessel built at Moen & Sønns Båtbyggeri in Risør. She arrived at Levanger on 31 December 1957 and cost NOK 510,000, and was not equipped with radar. She was initially used for the cross-fjord route; from 1962 she was used as a reserve until put into service on the Skarnsund route in 1964. The ferry was sold for NOK 50,000 in 1968 to Agder, and later became a restaurant at Aker Brygge in Oslo.
- MF Innherredsferja II was ordered in 1960 and put into service on 1 August 1962. She was 27 metres (89 ft) long and 8.4 metres (28 ft) wide and cost NOK 1,062,000. She was built by Ulstein Mekaniske Verksted and had a larger saloon and place for sixteen cars or six trucks. The bridge covered the full width of the vessel and had radar and other contemporary equipment. From 1964, the ferry was put into service on the Levanger–Hokstad route. In 1981, she was made a reserve ferry, and sold in 2002.

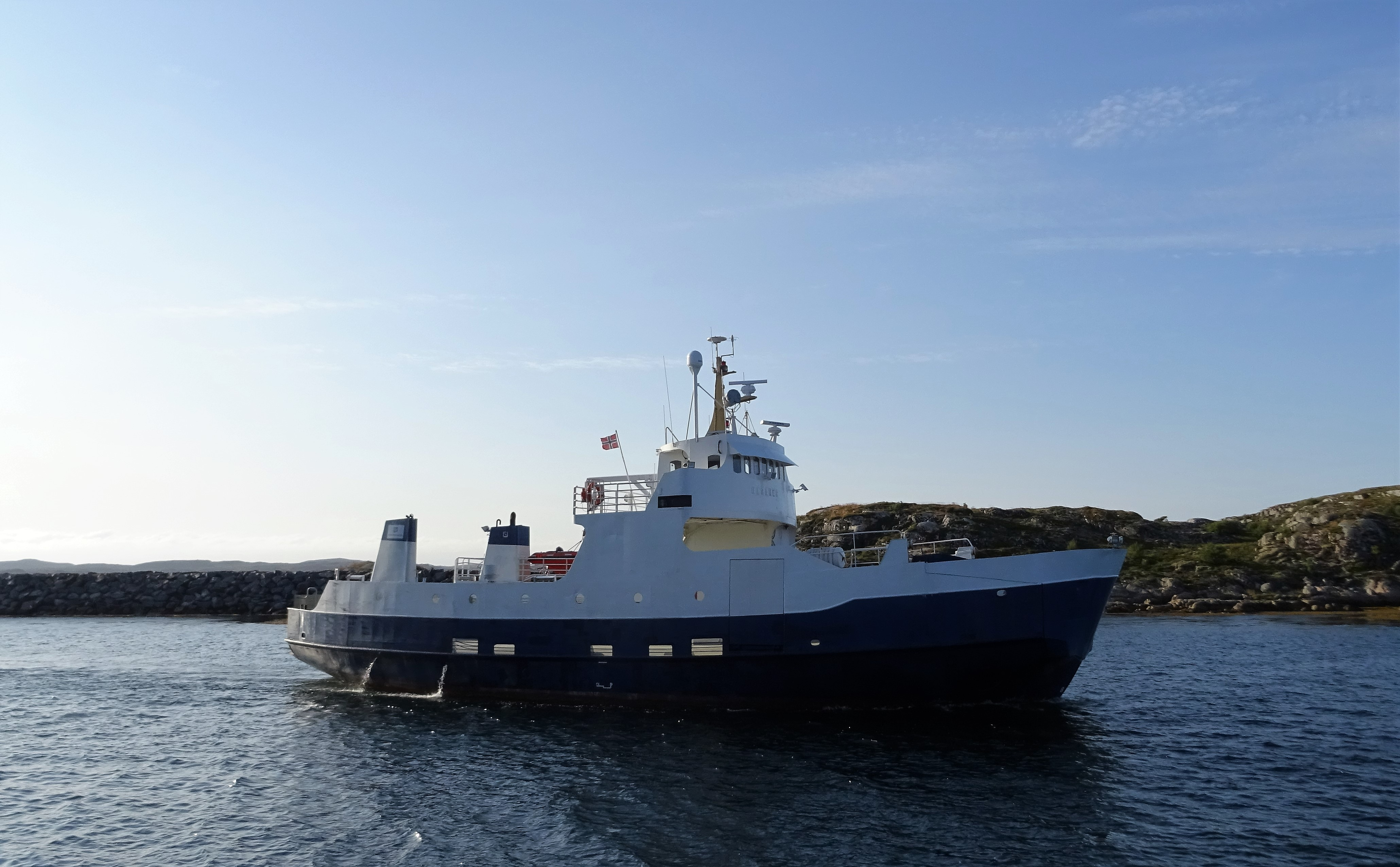
Skarnsund (I) was sold, renamed Haranes and is here depicted on the Borgan–Ramstadlandet Ferry where she has run since 1997.

- MF Skarnsund (I) was the same size as Innherredsferja II and was put into service on the Skarnsund route in 1969. She had capacity for sixteen cars and was built in Kristiansund for NOK 1,555,000. In 1982, she was replaced by Mosvik and was leased to Namsos Trafikkselskap. She was sold for NOK 1 in 1988.

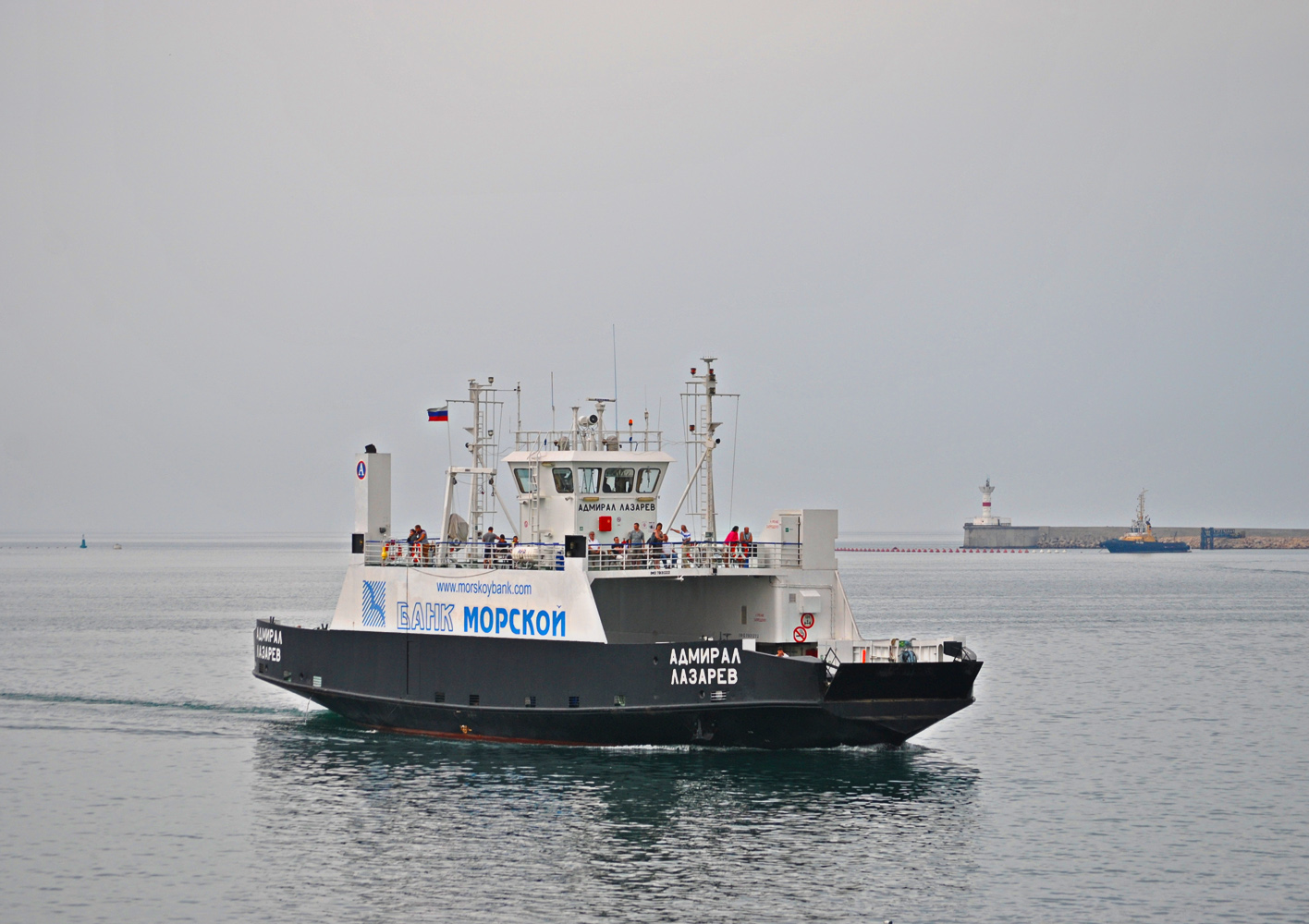
Ytterøy was sold to Ukraine in 2012, was renamed Admiral Lazarev and is here operating in Sevastopol

- MF Ytterøy cost NOK 10.5 million, had places for 30 cars and was bi-directional. Ytterøy weighed 300 tonnes and was 45 metres (148 ft) long. She was put into service on the Levanger–Hokstad route in February 1981. She became the reserve ferry following the purchase of Ytterøy II in 2002.
- MF Mosvik was bought in 1982. She dated from 1969 and had been in service near Bergen. Capacity was 24 cars and she was sold for NOK 1 million to Namsos Trafikkselskap in 1988.

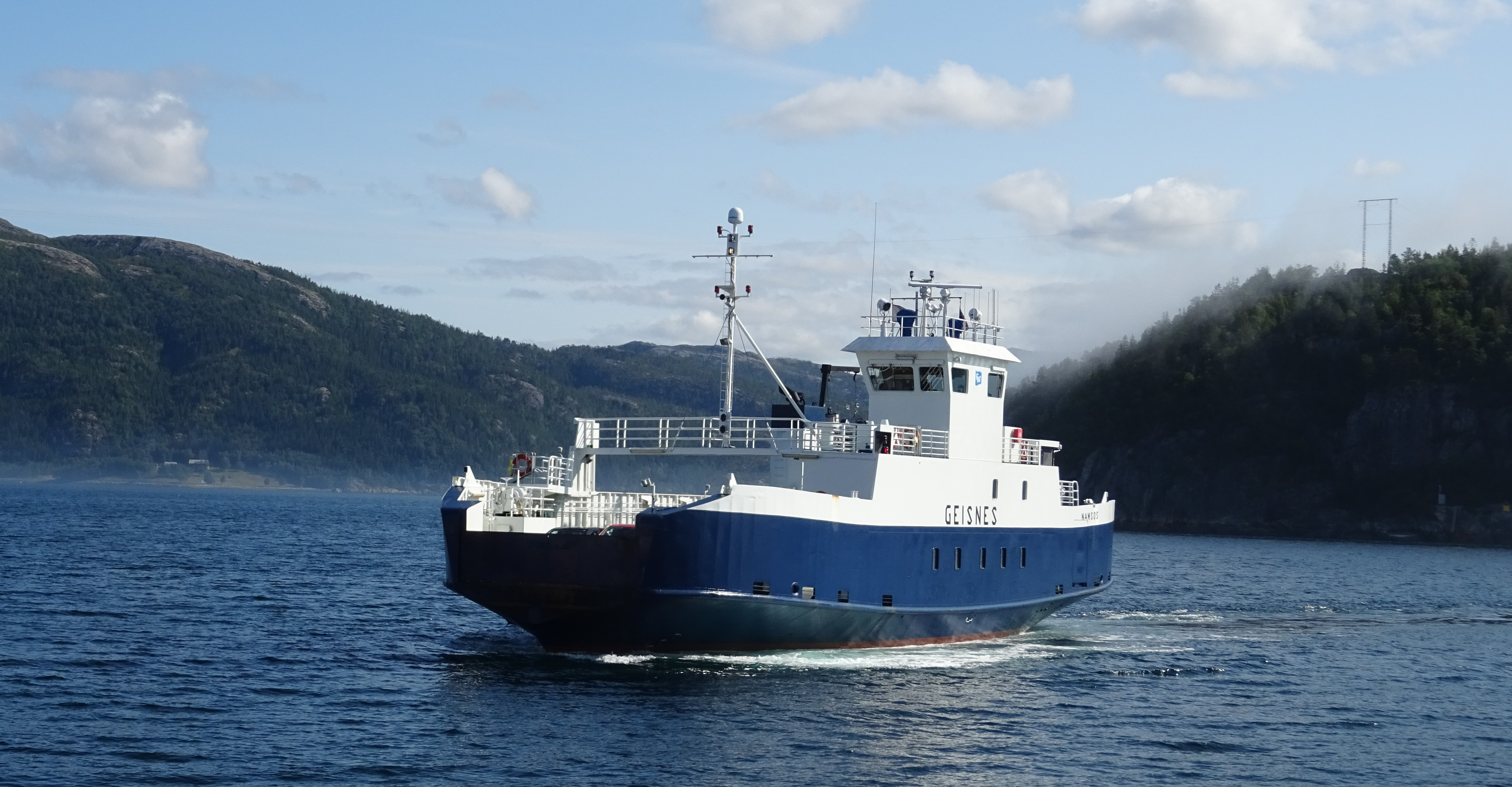
Skarnsund (II) was sold to Namsos Trafikkselskap who put her into use on the Seierstad–Ølhammeren Ferry as Geisnes.

- MF Skarnsund (II) was the same size as Ytterøy, had placed for 30 cars and was bi-directional. She cost NOK 27 million and was in service from 1987 to 1991, when she was sold to Namsos Trafikkselskap for NOK 23 million. The 330 tonne vessel was built by Trønderverftet.
- MF Ytterøy II was bought used from Torghatten Trafikkselskap, where she had been named Torghatten. She was built in 1987 and cost Innherredsferja NOK 19.2 million. She was 56 metres (184 ft) long, had three saloons and place for 40 cars. She was sold in 2007, following the loss of the PSO bid.
