= Vangshylla–Kjerringvik Ferry =

Former ferry route in Trøndelag, Norway

Vangshylla–Kjerringvik Skarnsund Ferry
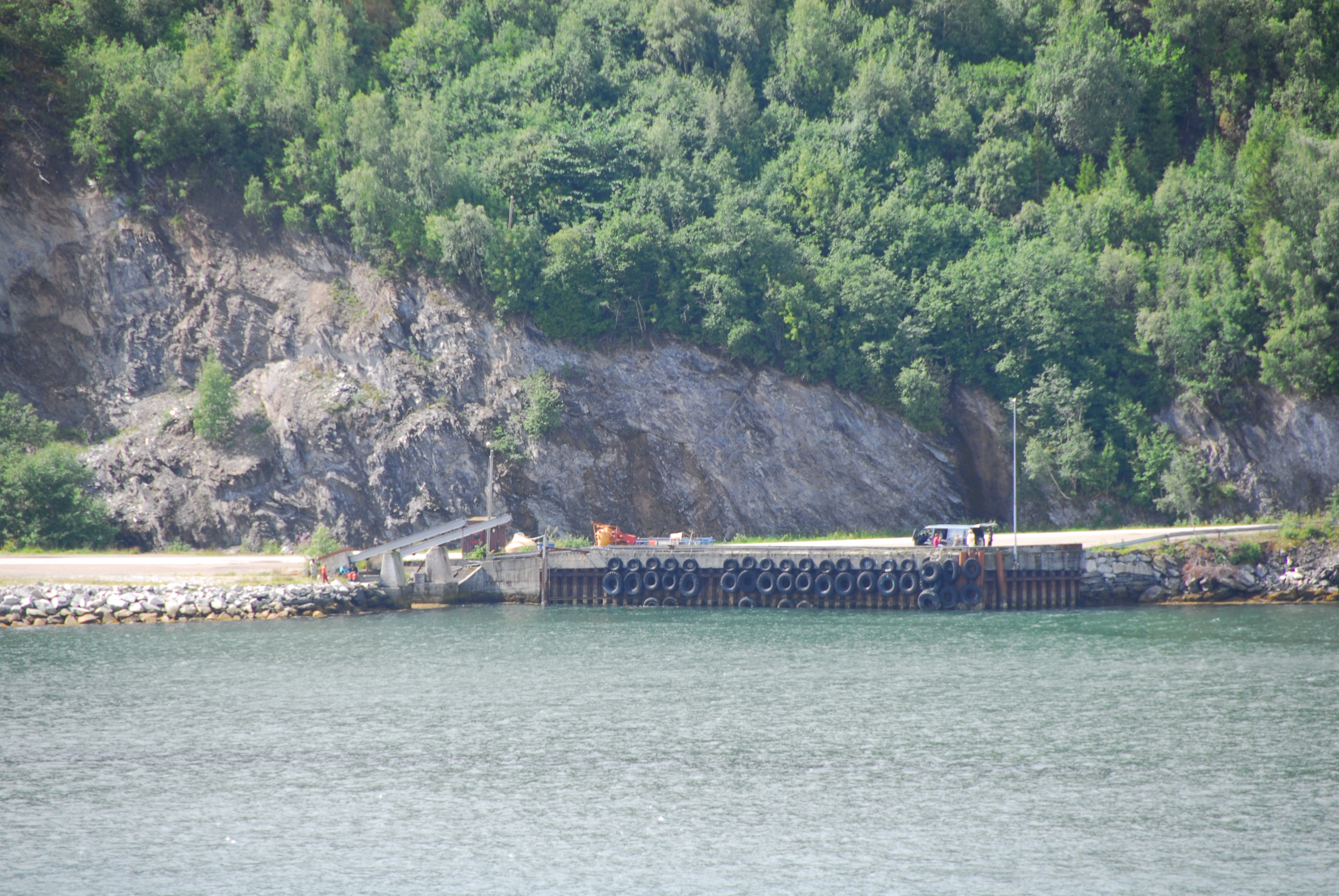
- Waterway: Trondheim Fjord at Skarnsund
- Transit type: Double-ended
- Route: Norwegian County Road 755
- Carries: Automobiles and passengers
- Terminals: Vangshylla; Kjerringvik
- Operator: Innherredsferja
- Authority: Norwegian Public Roads Administration
- Began operation: 1958
- Ended operation: 1991
- Successor: Skarnsund Bridge
- Travel time: 10 min
- Frequency: 1 / hour
- No. of vessels: MF Skarnsund

The Vangshylla–Kjerringvik Ferry is a closed automobile ferry on Norwegian County Road 755 that once connected the village of Kjerringvik in Mosvik Municipality on the Fosen peninsula to the village of Vangshylla in Inderøy Municipality in Innherred. The passage across Trondheim Fjord at Skarnsundet was operated by Innherredsferja from 1964 to 1991, when the ferry was replaced by the Skarnsund Bridge.

== History ==
Automobile ferry transport in Innherred started in 1958 when the company Innherredsferja started the route Levanger–Hokstad–Vangshylla–Kjerringvik–Venneshamn; connecting Levanger to the island of Ytterøya, and onwards connecting Inderøy with Mosvik. In 1964, a new road between Kjerringvik and Venneshamn opened, and at the same time a second ferry was purchased, allowing two routes to be established, the Levanger–Hokstad Ferry and the Vangshylla–Kjerringvik Ferry.

Four ferries have been used on the line; MF Innherredsferja (1964–69), MF Skarnsund (1969–82), MF Mosvik (1982–88), and MF Skarnsund II (1988–91).

Planning of the bridge began in 1983 with the establishment of the company AS Skarnsundsbrua that would finance the bridge and construction started in 1988. On 19 December 1991 the last ferry sailed, with King Harald V on board, and the bridge officially opened.
