= Vangshylla =

Village in Inderøy, Trøndelag, Norway

- Village
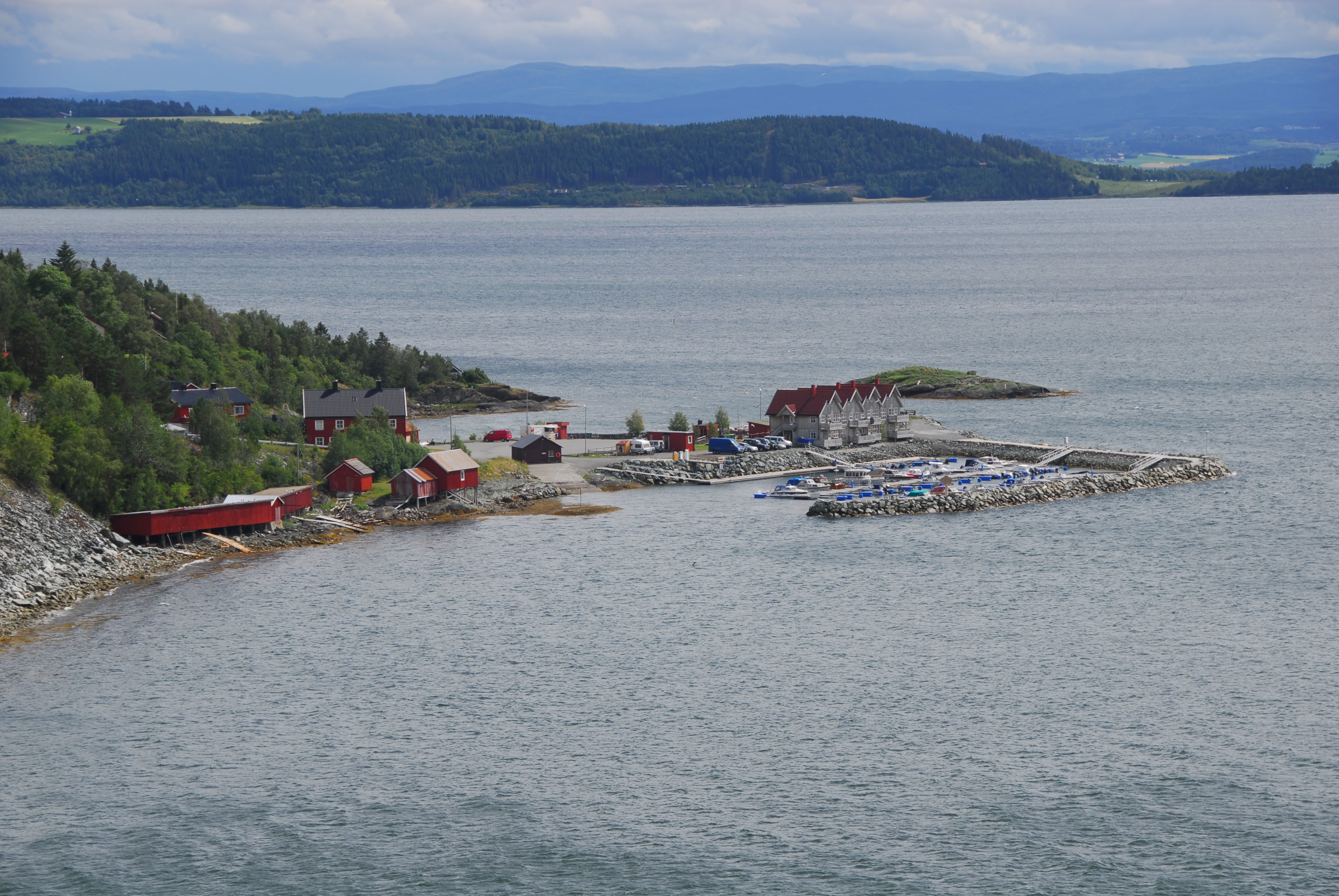
- View of Vangshylla as seen from Skarnsund Bridge
- Interactive map of Vangshylla
- Location within Trøndelag Location within Norway
- Coordinates: 63.8403°N 11.0918°E
- Country: Norway
- Region: Central Norway
- County: Trøndelag
- District: Innherred
- Municipality: Inderøy Municipality
- Elevation: 8 m (26 ft)
- Time zone: UTC+01:00 (CET)
  - Summer (DST): UTC+02:00 (CEST)
- Post Code: 7670 Inderøy

Vangshylla is a village in Inderøy Municipality in Trøndelag county, Norway. It is located at the southwest end of the Inderøya peninsula in the Utøya area, surrounded on two sides by the Trondheimsfjord. The village sits at the southern end of the Skarnsundet strait. Until 1991, when the Skarnsund Bridge opened, Vangshylla served as a ferry and fishing port. Since 1964, it has been served by the Vangshylla–Kjerringvik Ferry. It has since been converted into a marina and tourist center with rental accommodation for fishing in the Skarnsundet.

== History ==
Vangshylla was originally a croft under the farm Vang vestre. The first written records of Vang date from Archbishop Aslak Bolt's estate records from 1430, where Vang was split in three farms. The word "vang" means a plain with grass, while "hylla" refers to a shelf, with Vangshylla being located on a shelf below the other Vang-farms. Vang vestre was first known as Ytra Vang. The first records of Vangshylla being a croft were made in 1661 when it was registered to be leased by a fisherman or ferryman. The croft was bought by Soldier Svein Jakobsen Flakkenberg in 1790 and became registered as a farm.

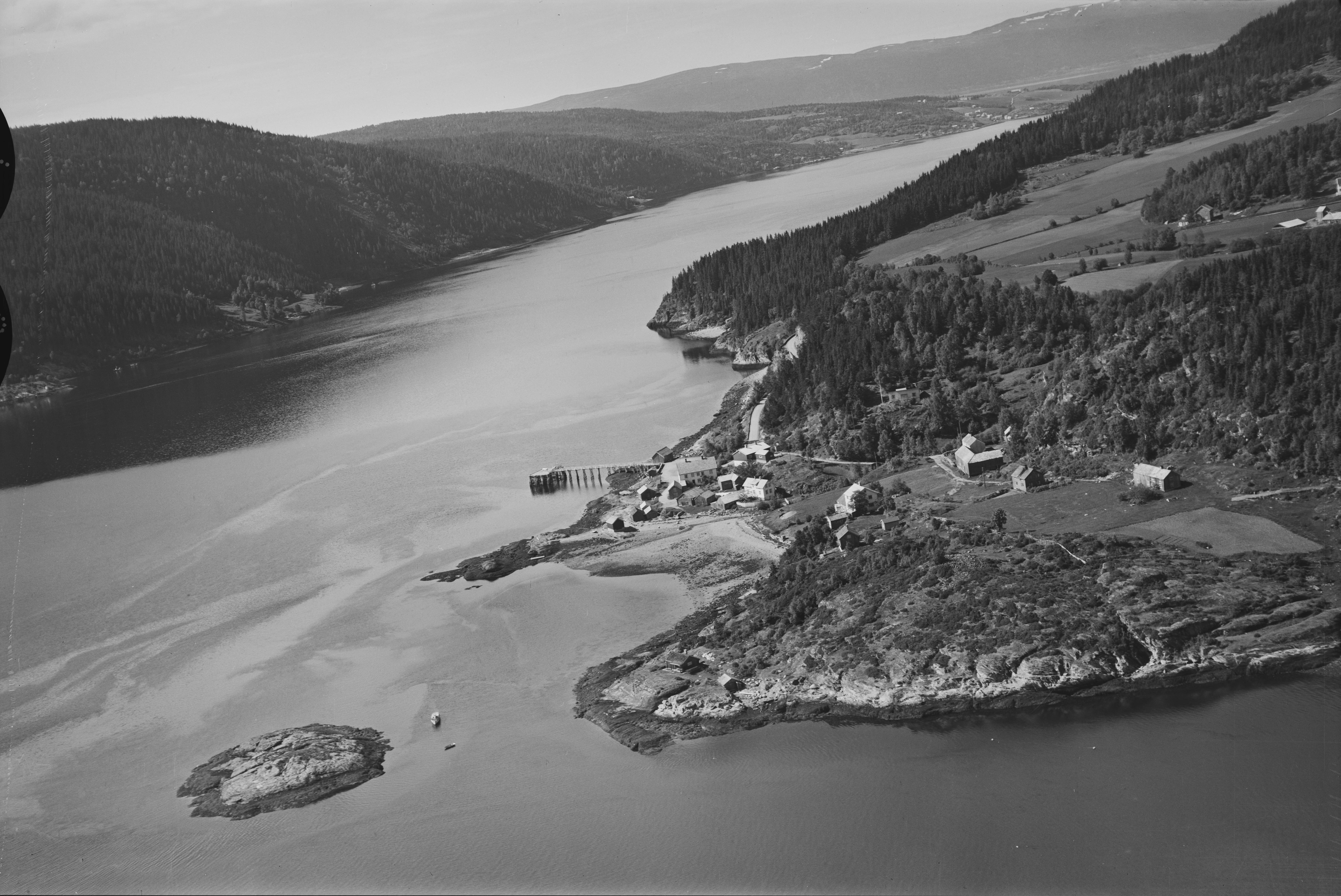
1953 view of Vangshylla, showing its position at the mouth of Skarnsundet

Vangshylla is located on the southwestern end of Inderøya and is the closest point to the outer parts of Trondheimsfjord, including Trondheim, as well as to the neighboring villages of Mosvik and Ytterøya. The farmer at Vangshylla operated a ferry service to these communities. The first recorded service was when the minister Jakob Jørgensen Wesseltoft in 1732 fled Inderøy by being rowed to Trondheim. At the time there was no road connection to the other parts of Inderøy. The good fishing in Skarnsundet contributed to creating a landing site for fishers. Larger vessels had to anchor and boats used to reach them. A road from Kvam to Vangshylla was built during the 19th century.

The first steamships in regular service up Trondheimsfjord started in 1856. Vangshylla was established as a stop, and the farm-owner Gotvard Hovd was hired to run the port. There were no suitable docks for the ships to land at, so boats were used to freight passengers and cargo out to the ships. Hovd later started a post office. In 1905, Thomas Næss established a general store adjacent to the docks, selling products delivered by ship. During the first decades of the 20th century, Georg Volset operated a motor boat from Vangshylla. The main transport was between Vangshylla, Mosvik, and Ytterøy, predominantly due to Mosvik and Ytterøy having a common minister, and Inderøy and Mosvik having a common general practitioner and veterinarian. In 1930, the road to Kvam was expanded to Vangshylla to a quality that allowed motorized vehicles, to follow a slightly different route. Fylkesbilene i Nord-Trøndelag started a scheduled bus service and Trygve Næss, the oldest son of Thomas Næss, started a taxi service. In 1933, a new store building was built by Næss.

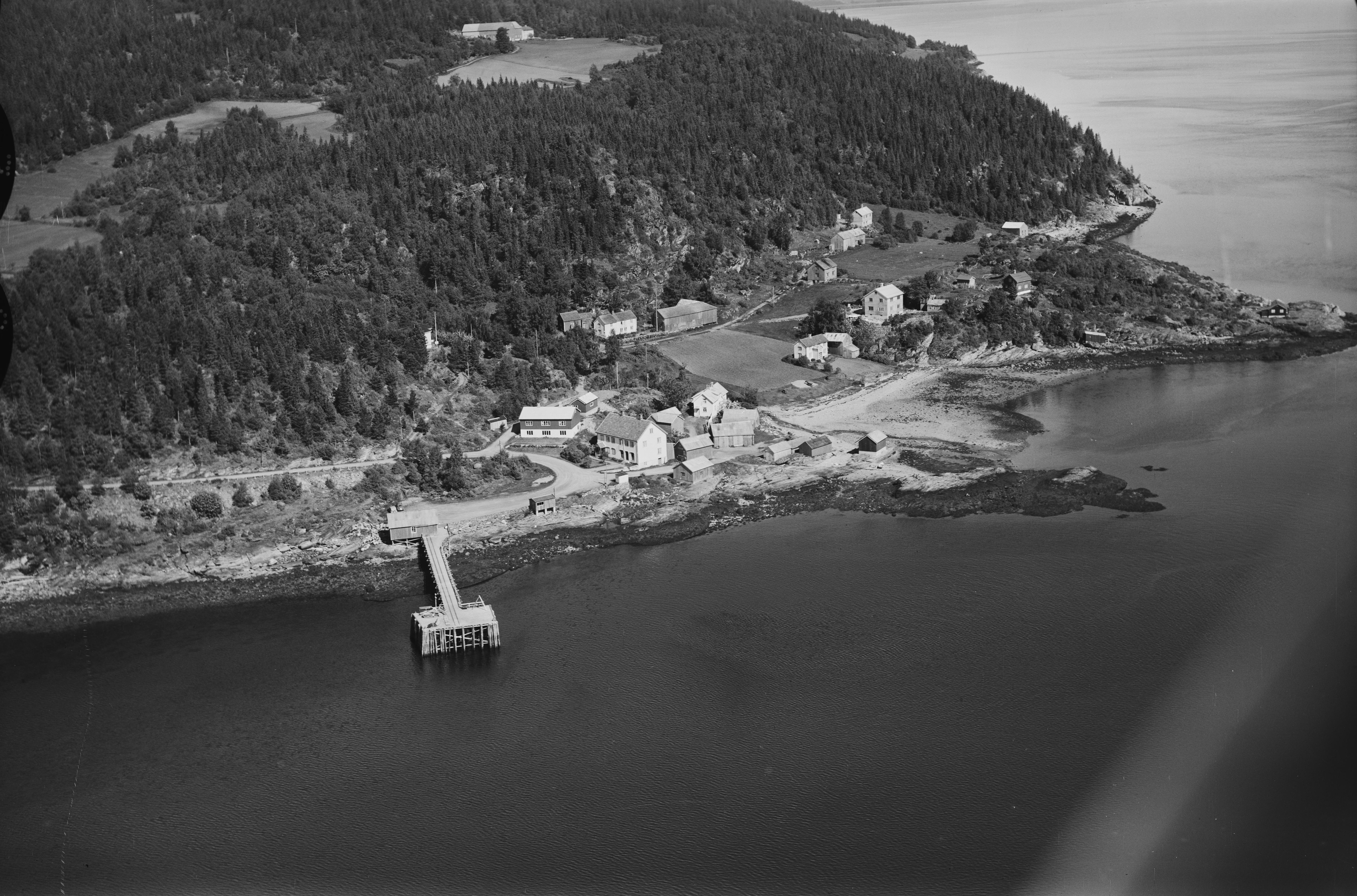
Vangshylla in 1953, showing the 1930 steamship dock

In 1930, a new dock was built that allowed direct access to land. There were normally three weekly arrivals of the ship from Innherred Dampskibsselskap and the bus. Until the 1940s, these came on Tuesday, Thursday and Saturday, when the newspapers Nord-Trøndelag and Inn-Trøndelagen were published. These days would assemble people from the area who would collect their mail and newspapers and conduct necessary purchases. During the 1930s, Anton Ulven started a sawmill at Dalsenget—on the hill above the dock area. This was later moved to Straumen and became Inderøy Trelast. The exports were large enough that separate ships were used for the timber. In 1950, the store was taken over by Trygve Næss and the buses, mail, and newspapers started coming daily. During the 1960s, the post office was closed and in 1970, the docks for the liners was demolished. The store ceased operations in 1978, but was replaced by a kiosk that remained until 1991.

On 1 February 1958, the company Innherredsferja started a car ferry service from Venneshamn and Kjerringvika via Vangshylla to Ytterøy Municipality and Levanger Municipality. At first, the service operated five times a day to Kjerringvik and three times a day to Venneshamn, while there were two daily services to Ytterøy and Levanger. From 1 June 1964, the Vangshylla–Kjerringvik–Venneshamn Ferry started. After the road from Venneshamn to Kjerringvik opened in the last years of the 1960s, the ferry remained with a single service, connecting the two villages on Norwegian National Road 755. Four ferries were used in the service: Innherredsferja (1958–69), Skarnsund (1969–82), Mosvik (1982–87) and Skarnsund II (1987–91).

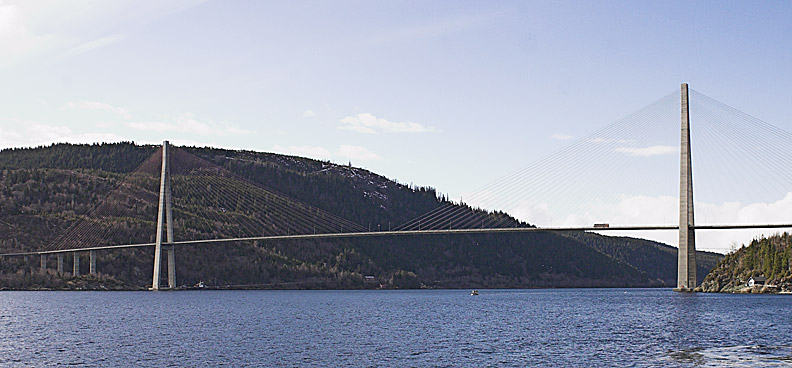
The opening of the Skarnsund Bridge in 1991 caused an enormous change in Vangshylla

The first meeting of local commercial and political interests to establish a bridge across Skarnsund was made in 1972. By 1983, it was formalized by the establishment of the company AS Skarnsundsbrua to finance construction. The Parliament of Norway passed the plans in 1986, and construction started two years later. The bridge cost 200 million kr. In its last year of operation, the ferry service carried 267,894 people, 108,482 cars, 13,878 trucks, 840 buses and 312 motorcycles. The final run of the ferry occurred on 19 December 1991, with Harald V on board. The bridge collected a toll until 15 May 2007. Following the closing of the ferry quay, a marina and breakwater were built at the location of the quay. Skarnsundet Fjordsenter was founded in 1992, and five years later opened eight apartments for rental for fishing tourists. The center was expanded in 2006, when a new breakwater, marina, a fishing equipment store and a marine fuel station were erected.

== Community life ==
The Vangshylla Farm has been split into 72 parcels, of which 31 have been built as holiday homes. Skarnsundet Fjordsenter operates eight apartments adjacent to their marina. This is mainly aimed at fishing tourists who can catch up to 90 species in Skarnsundet. The grounds also host a small camping ground. Vangshylla Båtforening also operates a marina. Skarnsund is the inner-most ice-free part of the Trondheimsfjord during winter. The village also serves divers, and Skarnsund has corals. The old road along the sea from Vangshylla to Kvam has been converted to a hiking trail.
