= Mosvik Municipality =

Former municipality in Trøndelag, Norway

Mosvik Municipality Mosvik kommune
- Former municipality
- Mosviken herred (historic name)
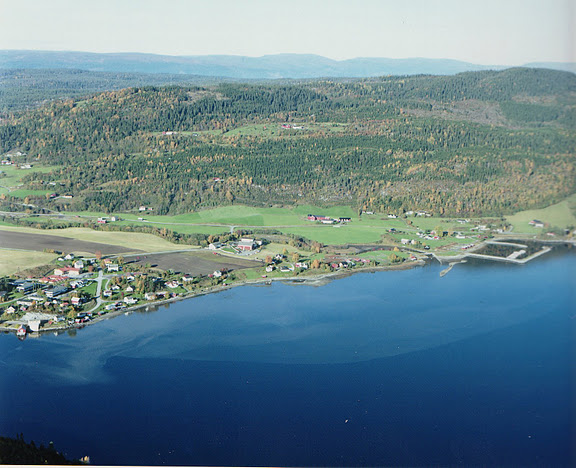
- View of Mosvik village

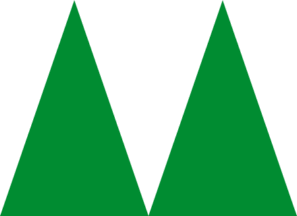
- Flag Coat of arms

- Nord-Trøndelag within Norway

- Mosvik within Nord-Trøndelag
- Coordinates: 63.8203°N 11.0066°E
- Country: Norway
- County: Nord-Trøndelag
- District: Innherred
- Established: 1 Jan 1901
  - Preceded by: Mosvik og Verran Municipality
- Disestablished: 1 Jan 2012
  - Succeeded by: Inderøy Municipality
- Administrative centre: Mosvik

Government
  - Mayor (2003–2011): Carl Ivar von Køppen (Sp)

Area (upon dissolution)
  - Total: 219.37 km^{2} (84.70 sq mi)
  - Land: 205.57 km^{2} (79.37 sq mi)
  - Water: 13.80 km^{2} (5.33 sq mi) 6.3%
  - Rank: #320 in Norway
- Highest elevation: 502.45 m (1,648.5 ft)

Population (2011)
  - Total: 811
  - Rank: #417 in Norway
  - Density: 3.7/km^{2} (9.6/sq mi)
  - Change (10 years): ▼ −12.9%
- Demonym: Mosbygg

Official language
  - Norwegian form: Bokmål
- Time zone: UTC+01:00 (CET)
  - Summer (DST): UTC+02:00 (CEST)
- ISO 3166 code: NO-1723

Mosvik is a former municipality in the old Nord-Trøndelag county in Norway. The municipality was part of the Innherred region. The 219.37-square-kilometre (84.70 sq mi) municipality existed from 1901 until its dissolution in 2012. The old municipality encompassed the southern part of what is now Inderøy Municipality in Trøndelag county. The municipality was located along the western shore of the Trondheimsfjorden and on the southwestern end of the Beitstadfjorden. The administrative centre of the municipality was the village of Mosvik where Mosvik Church is located. Other villages located near the village of Mosvik include Trongsundet, Framverran, Venneshamn, and Kjerringvik.

Prior to its dissolution in 2012, the 219-square-kilometre (85 sq mi) municipality was the 320th largest by area out of the 430 municipalities in Norway. Mosvik Municipality was the th most populous municipality in Norway with a population of about 811. The municipality's population density was 3.7 inhabitants per square kilometre (9.6/sq mi) and its population had decreased by 12.9% over the previous 10-year period.

Until 1991, the connection from Mosvik Municipality to the rest of the Innherred region was only available by a car ferry, at first via Ytterøya to Levanger, but later directly to Inderøy Municipality on the Vangshylla–Kjerringvik Ferry route. In 1991, the Skarnsund Bridge on Norwegian County Road 755 was completed, eliminating the need for a ferry across the Skarnsundet strait. The Skarnsund bridge was opened by King Harald V on 19 December 1991, after he had taken the last ferry across the fjord. A monument, the King's Stone, bearing the signature of the king, is located at the resting place on the Mosvik side.

Mosvik features two of Norway's 23 tallest structures: the Skavlen transmitter television and radio transmitter at 165 metres (541 ft) and the Skarnsund Bridge at 152 metres (499 ft).

== General information ==
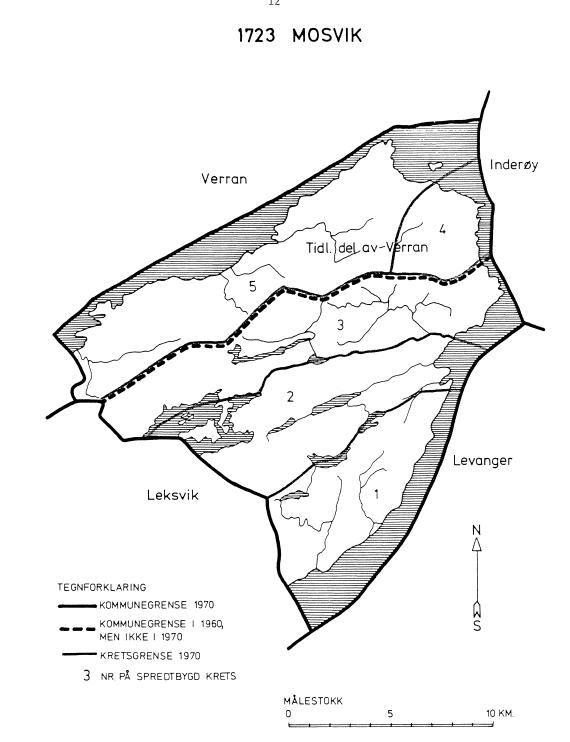
Map of Mosvik, as it was after the 1968 Framverran transfer. Framverran includes sections 4 and 5 on the map.

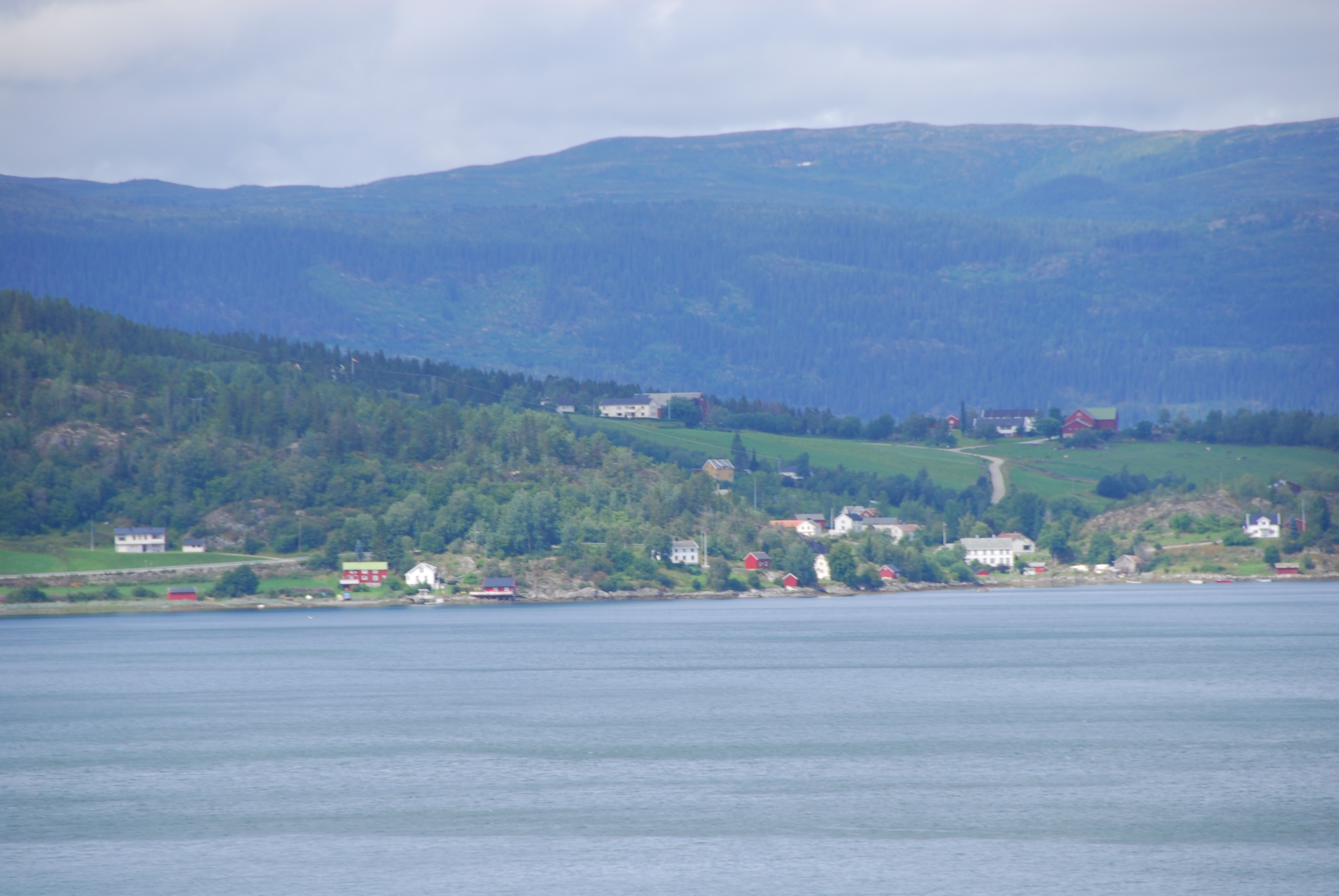
View of Venneshamn, seen from the Skarnsundet

The municipality of Mosvik was established on 1 January 1901 when the old Mosvik og Verran Municipality was divided into two new municipalities: Mosvik Municipality (population: 969) in the southeast and Verran Municipality (population: 1,456) in the north and west.

During the 1960s, there were many municipal changes across Norway due to the work of the Schei Committee. On 1 January 1968, the Framverran area on the south side of the Verrasundet strait (population: 395) was transferred from Verran Municipality to Mosvik Municipality.

On 1 January 2012, Mosvik Municipality ceased to exist when it was merged into the neighboring Inderøy Municipality. Prior to the merger, Mosvik Municipality had 811 residents.

=== Name ===
The municipality was named Mosvik (Old Norse: Masarvík) since the first Mosvik Church was built there. The first element is the genitive case of the river name Mǫs (now called the Mossa river). The meaning of the river name is unknown. The last element is vík which means "inlet" or "cove". Historically, the name of the municipality was spelled Mosviken. On 3 November 1917, a royal resolution changed the spelling of the name of the municipality to Mosvik, removing the definite form ending -en.

=== Coat of arms ===
The coat of arms was granted on 13 July 1984 and it was in use until 1 January 2012 when it became part of Inderøy Municipality. The official blazon is "Argent, two piles throughout reversed vert" (Norwegian: I sølv to grønne spisser). This means the arms have a field (background) has a tincture of argent which means it is commonly colored white, but if it is made out of metal, then silver is used. The charge is a two green triangles pointing upwards. The design was chosen to symbolize the forests and trees in the municipality as well as to look like the letter M, the initial of the municipality. The arms were designed by Einar H. Skjervold. The municipal flag has the same design as the coat of arms.

=== Churches ===
The Church of Norway had one parish (sokn) within Mosvik Municipality. It was part of the Nord-Innherad prosti (deanery) in the Diocese of Nidaros.

Churches in Mosvik Municipality
| Parish (sokn) | Church name | Location of the church | Year built |
|---|---|---|---|
| Mosvik | Mosvik Church | Mosvik | 1884 |
| Mosvik | Vestvik Church | Framverran | 1905 |

== Geography ==
The municipality was located south of the Skarnsundet strait with the main Trondheimsfjord to the east and the Verrasundet strait to the west. Leksvik Municipality was located to the southwest, Verran Municipality was located to the north, and Inderøy Municipality was located to the east (across the strait). The lake Meltingvatnet lies along the municipal border with Leksvik. The highest point in the municipality is the 502.45-metre (1,648.5 ft) tall mountain Storknuken.

== Government ==
While it existed, Mosvik Municipality was responsible for primary education (through 10th grade), outpatient health services, senior citizen services, welfare and other social services, zoning, economic development, and municipal roads and utilities. The municipality was governed by a municipal council of directly elected representatives. The mayor was indirectly elected by a vote of the municipal council. The municipality was under the jurisdiction of the Frostating Court of Appeal. Mosvik's waste management was after 1988 carried out by the intermunicipal Innherred Renovasjon.

=== Municipal council ===
The municipal council (Kommunestyre) of Mosvik Municipality was made up of representatives that were elected to four year terms. The tables below show the historical composition of the council by political party.

Mosvik kommunestyre 2007–2011
| Party name (in Norwegian) | Number of representatives |
|---|---|
| Labour Party (Arbeiderpartiet) | 4 |
| Conservative Party (Høyre) | 2 |
| Christian Democratic Party (Kristelig Folkeparti) | 1 |
| Centre Party (Senterpartiet) | 4 |
| Socialist Left Party (Sosialistisk Venstreparti) | 1 |
| Liberal Party (Venstre) | 1 |
| Total number of members: | 13 |
Note: On 1 January 2012, Mosvik Municipality became part of Inderøy Municipality.

Mosvik kommunestyre 2003–2007
| Party name (in Norwegian) | Number of representatives |
|---|---|
| Labour Party (Arbeiderpartiet) | 4 |
| Christian Democratic Party (Kristelig Folkeparti) | 1 |
| Centre Party (Senterpartiet) | 5 |
| Socialist Left Party (Sosialistisk Venstreparti) | 1 |
| Liberal Party (Venstre) | 1 |
| Joint list for the Conservative Party and Independents Group (Fellesliste for Høyre og Uavhengiges gruppe) | 1 |
| Total number of members: | 13 |

Mosvik kommunestyre 1999–2003
| Party name (in Norwegian) | Number of representatives |
|---|---|
| Labour Party (Arbeiderpartiet) | 7 |
| Christian Democratic Party (Kristelig Folkeparti) | 2 |
| Centre Party (Senterpartiet) | 7 |
| Liberal Party (Venstre) | 1 |
| Joint list for the Conservative Party and Independents Group (Fellesliste for Høyre og Uavhengiges gruppe) | 2 |
| Total number of members: | 19 |

Mosvik kommunestyre 1995–1999
| Party name (in Norwegian) | Number of representatives |
|---|---|
| Labour Party (Arbeiderpartiet) | 5 |
| Christian Democratic Party (Kristelig Folkeparti) | 3 |
| Centre Party (Senterpartiet) | 8 |
| Conservative Party/Liberal Party and independents group (Høyre/Venstre og uavhengiges gruppe) | 3 |
| Total number of members: | 19 |

Mosvik kommunestyre 1991–1995
| Party name (in Norwegian) | Number of representatives |
|---|---|
| Labour Party (Arbeiderpartiet) | 7 |
| Christian Democratic Party (Kristelig Folkeparti) | 2 |
| Centre Party (Senterpartiet) | 6 |
| Liberal Party (Venstre) | 1 |
| Independents group (Uavhengiges gruppe) | 3 |
| Total number of members: | 19 |

Mosvik kommunestyre 1987–1991
| Party name (in Norwegian) | Number of representatives |
|---|---|
| Labour Party (Arbeiderpartiet) | 6 |
| Christian Democratic Party (Kristelig Folkeparti) | 3 |
| Centre Party (Senterpartiet) | 5 |
| Liberal Party (Venstre) | 1 |
| Independent group list (Uavhengig gruppes liste) | 4 |
| Total number of members: | 19 |

Mosvik kommunestyre 1983–1987
| Party name (in Norwegian) | Number of representatives |
|---|---|
| Labour Party (Arbeiderpartiet) | 7 |
| Christian Democratic Party (Kristelig Folkeparti) | 3 |
| Centre Party (Senterpartiet) | 6 |
| Liberal Party (Venstre) | 1 |
| Independents group (Uavhengiges gruppe) | 2 |
| Total number of members: | 19 |

Mosvik kommunestyre 1979–1983
| Party name (in Norwegian) | Number of representatives |
|---|---|
| Labour Party (Arbeiderpartiet) | 7 |
| Christian Democratic Party (Kristelig Folkeparti) | 3 |
| Centre Party (Senterpartiet) | 5 |
| Independents list (Uavhengiges liste) | 4 |
| Total number of members: | 19 |

Mosvik kommunestyre 1975–1979
| Party name (in Norwegian) | Number of representatives |
|---|---|
| Labour Party (Arbeiderpartiet) | 7 |
| Christian Democratic Party (Kristelig Folkeparti) | 4 |
| Centre Party (Senterpartiet) | 6 |
| Independents List (Uavhengig Liste) | 2 |
| Total number of members: | 19 |

Mosvik kommunestyre 1971–1975
| Party name (in Norwegian) | Number of representatives |
|---|---|
| Labour Party (Arbeiderpartiet) | 6 |
| Christian Democratic Party (Kristelig Folkeparti) | 4 |
| Centre Party (Senterpartiet) | 7 |
| Local List(s) (Lokale lister) | 2 |
| Total number of members: | 19 |

Mosvik kommunestyre 1967–1971
| Party name (in Norwegian) | Number of representatives |
|---|---|
| Labour Party (Arbeiderpartiet) | 7 |
| Christian Democratic Party (Kristelig Folkeparti) | 5 |
| Centre Party (Senterpartiet) | 5 |
| Local List(s) (Lokale lister) | 2 |
| Total number of members: | 19 |

Mosvik kommunestyre 1963–1967
| Party name (in Norwegian) | Number of representatives |
|---|---|
| Labour Party (Arbeiderpartiet) | 5 |
| Christian Democratic Party (Kristelig Folkeparti) | 5 |
| Joint List(s) of Non-Socialist Parties (Borgerlige Felleslister) | 3 |
| Total number of members: | 13 |

Mosvik herredsstyre 1959–1963
| Party name (in Norwegian) | Number of representatives |
|---|---|
| Labour Party (Arbeiderpartiet) | 4 |
| Christian Democratic Party (Kristelig Folkeparti) | 6 |
| Joint List(s) of Non-Socialist Parties (Borgerlige Felleslister) | 3 |
| Total number of members: | 13 |

Mosvik herredsstyre 1955–1959
| Party name (in Norwegian) | Number of representatives |
|---|---|
| Labour Party (Arbeiderpartiet) | 4 |
| List of workers, fishermen, and small farmholders (Arbeidere, fiskere, småbrukere liste) | 6 |
| Joint List(s) of Non-Socialist Parties (Borgerlige Felleslister) | 3 |
| Total number of members: | 13 |

Mosvik herredsstyre 1951–1955
| Party name (in Norwegian) | Number of representatives |
|---|---|
| Labour Party (Arbeiderpartiet) | 4 |
| List of workers, fishermen, and small farmholders (Arbeidere, fiskere, småbrukere liste) | 5 |
| Local List(s) (Lokale lister) | 3 |
| Total number of members: | 12 |

Mosvik herredsstyre 1947–1951
| Party name (in Norwegian) | Number of representatives |
|---|---|
| Labour Party (Arbeiderpartiet) | 5 |
| Local List(s) (Lokale lister) | 7 |
| Total number of members: | 12 |

Mosvik herredsstyre 1945–1947
| Party name (in Norwegian) | Number of representatives |
|---|---|
| List of workers, fishermen, and small farmholders (Arbeidere, fiskere, småbrukere liste) | 8 |
| Local List(s) (Lokale lister) | 4 |
| Total number of members: | 12 |

Mosvik herredsstyre 1937–1941*
| Party name (in Norwegian) | Number of representatives |
|---|---|
| Labour Party (Arbeiderpartiet) | 6 |
| Local List(s) (Lokale lister) | 6 |
| Total number of members: | 12 |
Note: Due to the German occupation of Norway during World War II, no elections were held for new municipal councils until after the war ended in 1945.

=== Mayors ===
The mayor (Norwegian: ordfører) of Mosvik Municipality was the political leader of the municipality and the chairperson of the municipal council. Here is a list of people who held this position:

- 1901–1919: Einar Jenssen (H)
- 1920–1934: Ole H. Sæteraas (V)
- 1935–1941: Aksel Saltvik (LL)
- 1942–1945: Ola M. Hestebeit (NS)
- 1945–1945: Aksel Saltvik (Ap)
- 1946–1947: Elias Lorentsen (Ap)
- 1948–1955: Tomas Tangstad (V)
- 1956–1969: Trygve Aaring (LL)
- 1970–1979: Peter Å. Gipling (Sp)
- 1980–1986: Jarle Aune (Sp)
- 1987–1987: Asbjørn Wibe (LL)
- 1988–1993: Arne Aasan (Ap)
- 1994–2003: Per Vennes (Sp)
- 2003–2011: Carl Ivar von Køppen (Sp)

== Notable people ==
- Gunnar Viken (born 1948), a former county mayor who was raised on a family farm in Mosvik
- Petter Northug (born 1986 in Framverran), a Norwegian former cross-country skier and double Olympic champion
- Tomas Northug (born 1990 in Mosvik), a Norwegian cross-country skier
- Even Northug (born 1995), a Norwegian cross-country skier

== Twin towns – sister cities ==
- Vimpeli, Finland

== See also ==
- List of former municipalities of Norway
