= Venneshamn =

Village in Inderøy Municipality, Norway

- Village
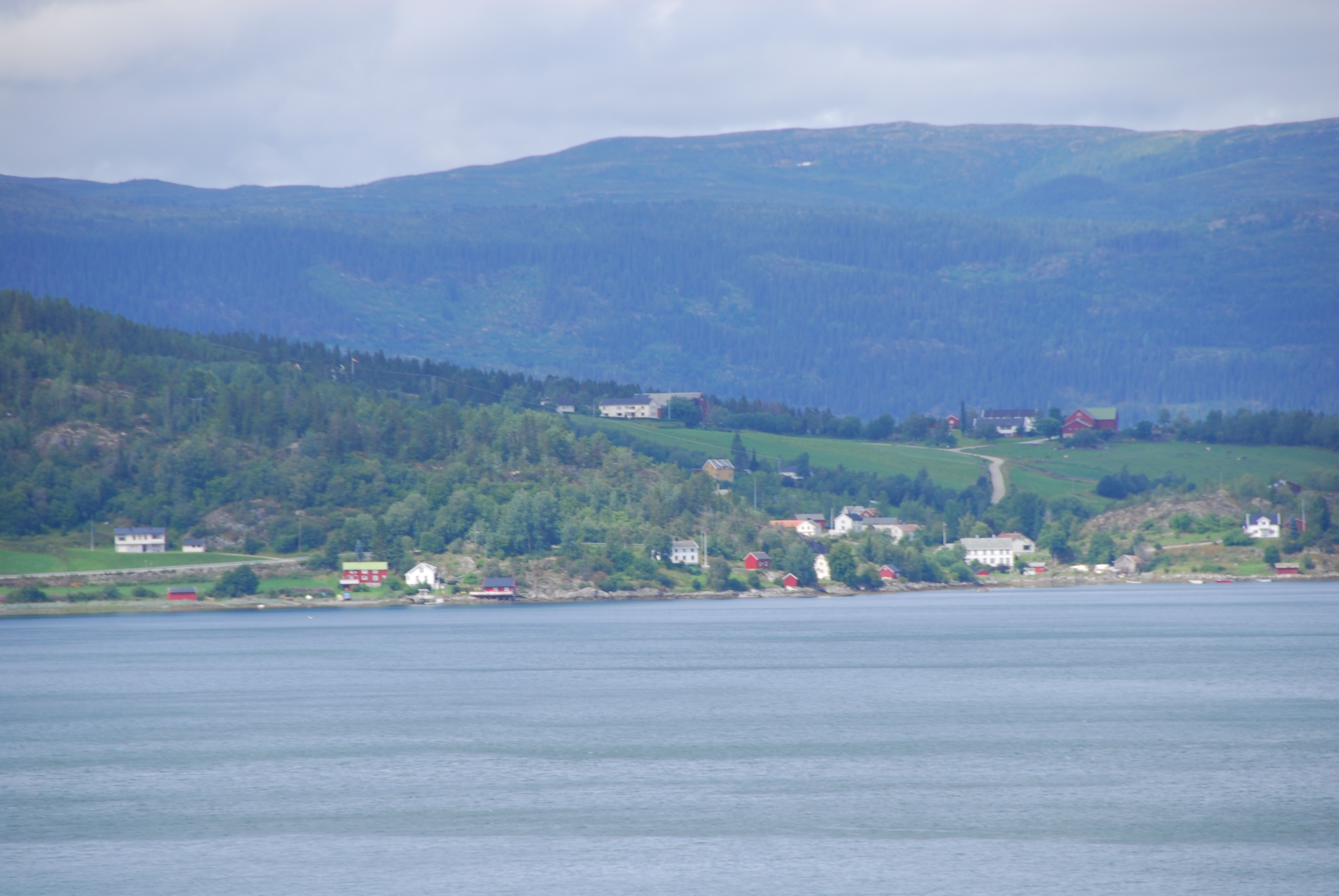
- View of the village
- Interactive map of Venneshamn
- Location within Trøndelag Location within Norway
- Coordinates: 63.8748°N 11.0415°E
- Country: Norway
- Region: Central Norway
- County: Trøndelag
- District: Innherred
- Municipality: Inderøy Municipality
- Elevation: 8 m (26 ft)
- Time zone: UTC+01:00 (CET)
  - Summer (DST): UTC+02:00 (CEST)
- Post Code: 7690 Mosvik

Venneshamn is a village in Inderøy Municipality in Trøndelag county, Norway. It is located along the Trondheimsfjord on the northeastern end of the Fosen peninsula. The village is located about 10 kilometres (6.2 mi) north of the village of Mosvik, and about 5 kilometres (3.1 mi) north of the village of Kjerringvika and the Skarnsund Bridge that crosses the Skarnsundet strait. The village of Framverran lies about 4 kilometres (2.5 mi) northwest of Venneshamn. Verran Sparebank (Norway's smallest bank) was based in Venneshamn until 2006 when it merged with Grong Sparebank. There was also a general store here until it closed in August 2008.

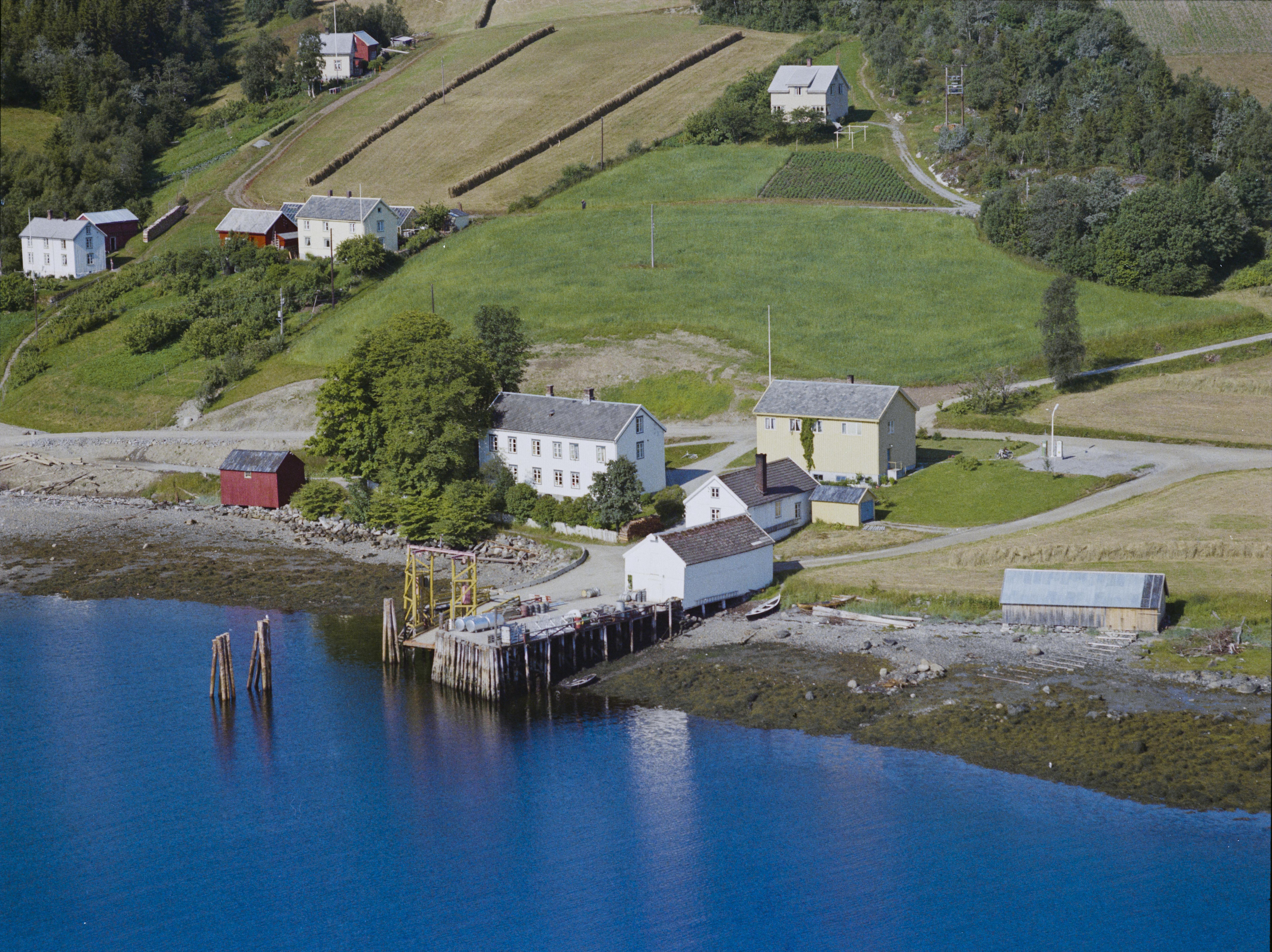
Venneshamn in 1965, while the village was still dependent the ferry service

The port of Venneshamn had a scheduled ferry service for many years. In 1958, the car ferry company Innherredsferja started the Levanger–Hokstad–Vangshylla–Kjerringvika–Venneshamn Ferry, connecting the village to roads at Mosvik, Inderøy, Ytterøya, and Levanger. In 1968, a county road was completed from Kjerringvika to Venneshamn, granting the settlement road access to the main village of Mosvik.
