= Mosvik =

Mosvik may refer to:

== Places ==
- Mosvik (village), a village in Inderøy Municipality in Trøndelag county, Norway
- Mosvik Municipality, a former municipality in the old Nord-Trøndelag county, Norway
- Mosvik Church, a church in Inderøy Municipality in Trøndelag county, Norway

== Other ==
- Mosvik IL, a sports club based in Mosvik in Inderøy Municipality in Trøndelag county, Norway
