= Framverran =

Village in Inderøy Municipality, Norway

- Village
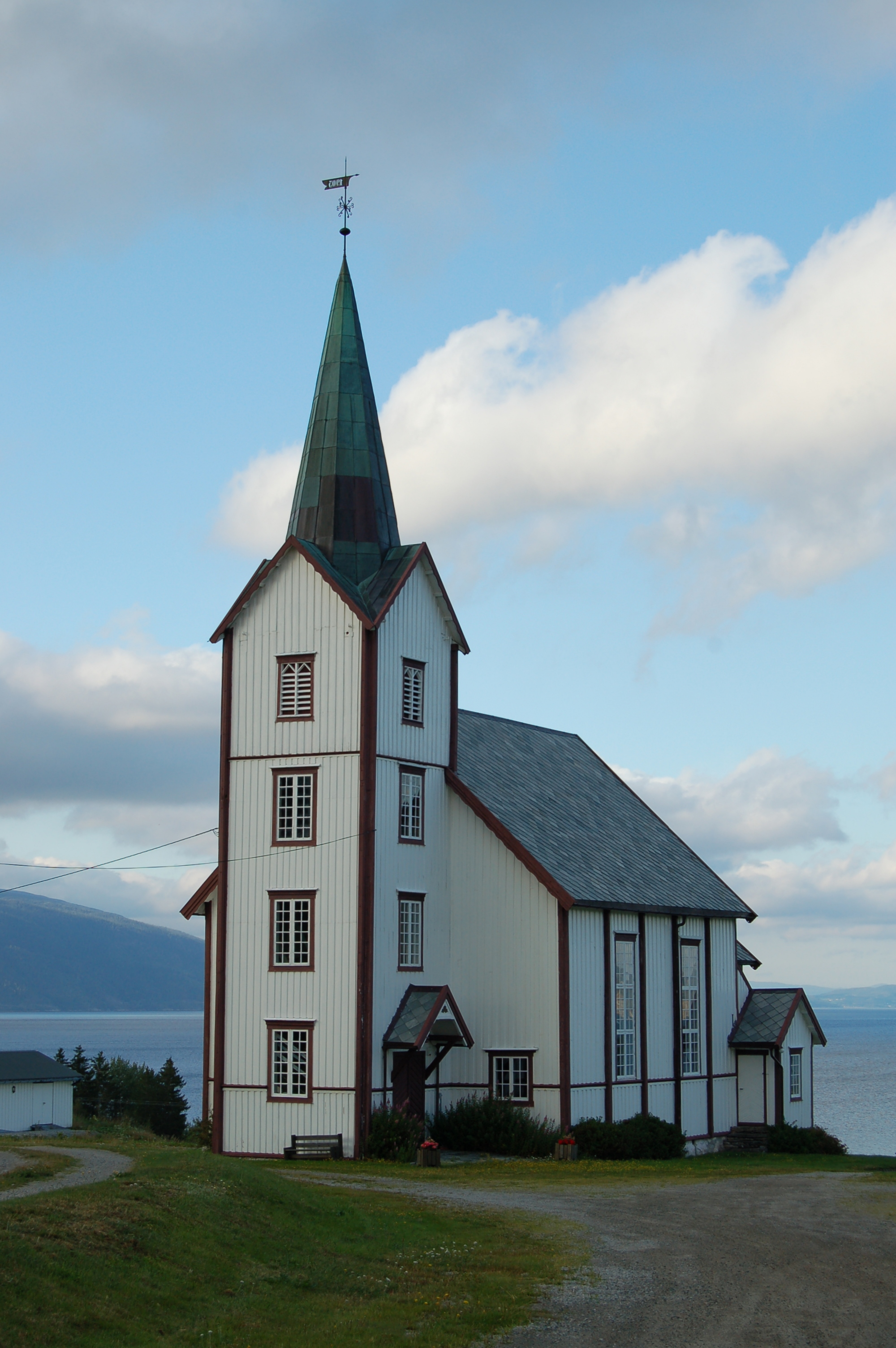
- View of Vestvik kirke in Framverran
- Interactive map of Framverran
- Location within Trøndelag Location within Norway
- Coordinates: 63.887169°N 11.00105°E
- Country: Norway
- Region: Central Norway
- County: Trøndelag
- District: Innherred
- Municipality: Inderøy Municipality
- Elevation: 25 m (82 ft)
- Time zone: UTC+01:00 (CET)
  - Summer (DST): UTC+02:00 (CEST)
- Post Code: 7690 Mosvik

Framverran is a village in Inderøy Municipality in Trøndelag county, Norway. It is located about 15 kilometres (9.3 mi) from the village of Mosvik, about 4 kilometres (2.5 mi) northwest of the village of Venneshamn, and about 15 kilometres (9.3 mi) northeast of Trongsundet. The village sits along the Beitstadfjorden, southeast of the mouth of the Verrasundet and northwest of the mouth of the Skarnsundet strait.

The Vestvik Church is the located in Framverran. From 1993 to 2010, Framverran School had been educating all of the 1st to 4th-grade pupils of the Mosvik area.

== History ==
Historically, Framverran was part of Ytterøy Municipality before 1867, then it was part of Mosvik og Verran Municipality from 1867 until 1901, it was then part of Verran Municipality from 1901 to 1967. It was part of Mosvik Municipality from 1968 to 2012, and since 2012, it has been a part of Inderøy Municipality.

== Notable people ==
- Petter Northug is from Framverran.
