= Skarnsund Bridge =

Bridge in Inderøy, Norway

Skarnsund Bridge Skarnsundbrua
- Coordinates: 63°50′36″N 11°04′33″E
- Carries: Fv755
- Crosses: Skarnsundet strait
- Locale: Inderøy Municipality, Norway
- Maintained by: Statens vegvesen

Characteristics
- Design: Cable-stayed bridge
- Total length: 1,010 metres (3,310 ft)
- Longest span: 530 metres (1,740 ft)
- Clearance above: 45 metres (148 ft)

History
- Opened: 19 Dec 1991

The Skarnsund Bridge (Norwegian: Skarnsundet bru or Skarnsundbrua) is a 1,010-metre (3,310 ft) long concrete cable-stayed bridge that crosses the Skarnsundet strait in Inderøy Municipality in Trøndelag county, Norway. When finished in 1991, it replaced the Vangshylla–Kjerringvik Ferry and it gives the communities in Indre Fosen Municipality easier access to the central areas of Innherred. The bridge is the only road crossing of the Trondheimsfjord, and is located along Norwegian County Road 755.

The bridge has a span of 530 metres (1,739 ft), making it the longest of its type in the world for two years. The two 152-metre (499 ft) tall pylons are located at Kjerringvik on the west side, and at Vangshylla on the east side. Following the opening, there was a seventeen-year collection of tolls, needed to finance 30% of the 200 million kr investment. In 2007, the bridge was listed as a cultural heritage. In 2012, Mosvik Municipality and Inderøy Municipality (located on either side of the bridge) were merged to form one large municipality of Inderøy.

== Background ==
Prior to its 2012 merger with Inderøy Municipality, Mosvik Municipality was a separate municipality on the Fosen peninsula and part of the old Nord-Trøndelag county. The first automotive transport from Mosvik to the more populated area of Innherred commenced in 1958, when the ferry company Innherredsferja started the Levanger–Hokstad–Vangshylla–Kjerringvik–Venneshamn route. In 1964, the road between Kjerringvik and Vennesham, both in Mosvik Municipality, opened, and a new ferry was purchased, establishing the Vangshylla–Kjerringvik Ferry.

The ferry, and subsequently the bridge, is located at the narrowest section of Skarnsundet, between the villages of Kjerringvik and Vangshylla. In addition to Mosvik Municipality, the bridge also catered to the neighboring Leksvik Municipality (now part of Indre Fosen Municipality), further out down the fjord. The bridge is the only one to cross the Trondheimsfjord.

== History ==
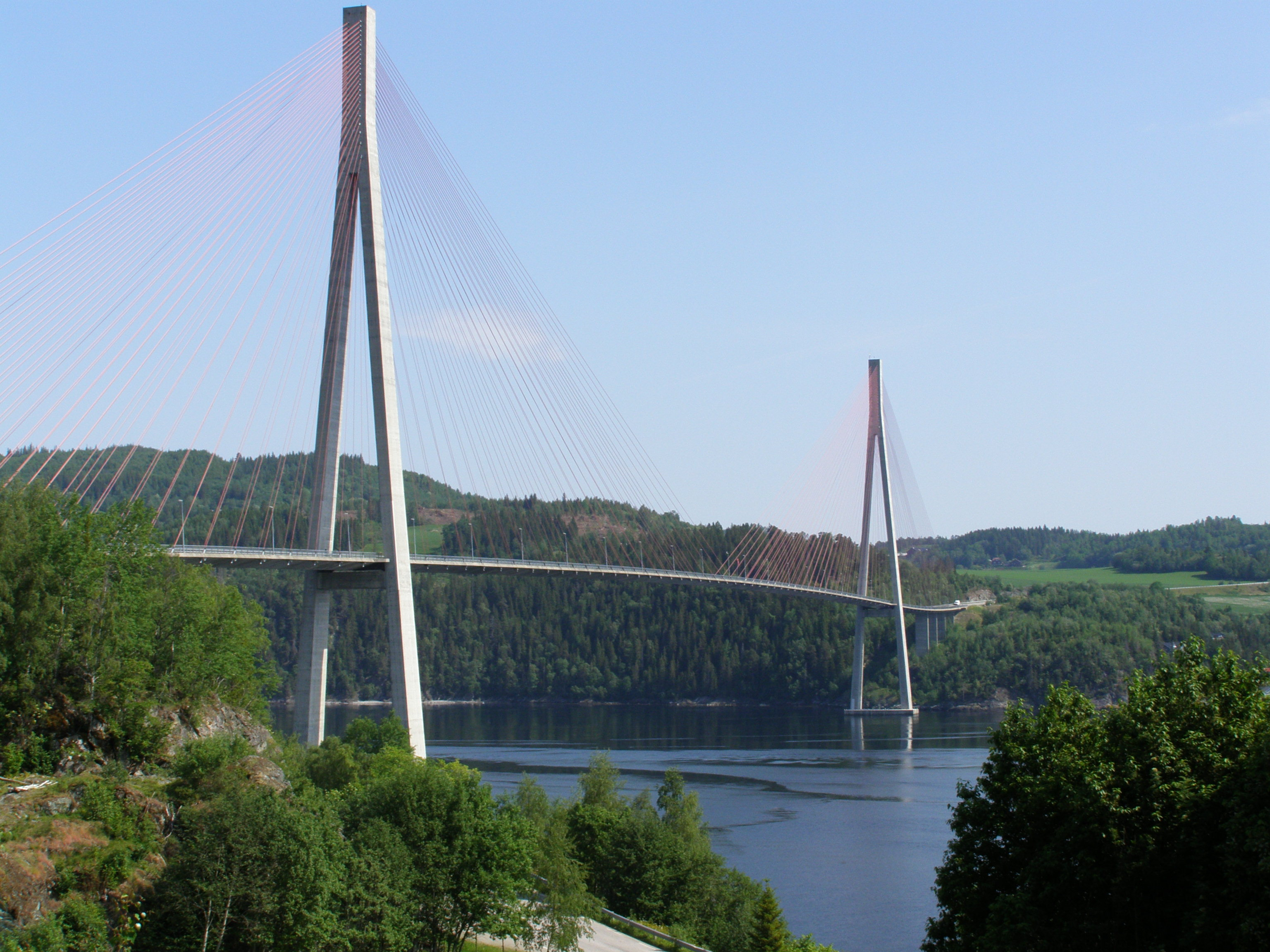
The bridge seen from the Mosvik side

The first meeting of local commercial and political interests to establish a bridge was made in 1972. By 1983, it was formalized by the establishment of the company AS Skarnsundsbrua to finance construction. The Parliament of Norway passed the plans in 1986, and construction started two years later. The main contractor was Aker; and after the bridge was finished, maintenance was taken over by the Nord-Trøndelag Public Roads Administration. The bridge cost 200 million kr. The bridge was opened by King Harald V on 19 December 1991, after he had taken the last ferry across the fjord. A monument, the King's Stone, bearing the signature of the king, is located at the resting place on the Mosvik side.

Following the opening, it won several awards: Betongtavlen (1992); Beautiful Roads Award (1994); and the international FIP Award (1994). In 2008, the Norwegian Directorate for Cultural Heritage listed the bridge as a protected cultural heritage. In 2010, the bridge came in second in a competition held by Teknisk Ukeblad to declare Norway's most beautiful road bridge.

== Specifications ==
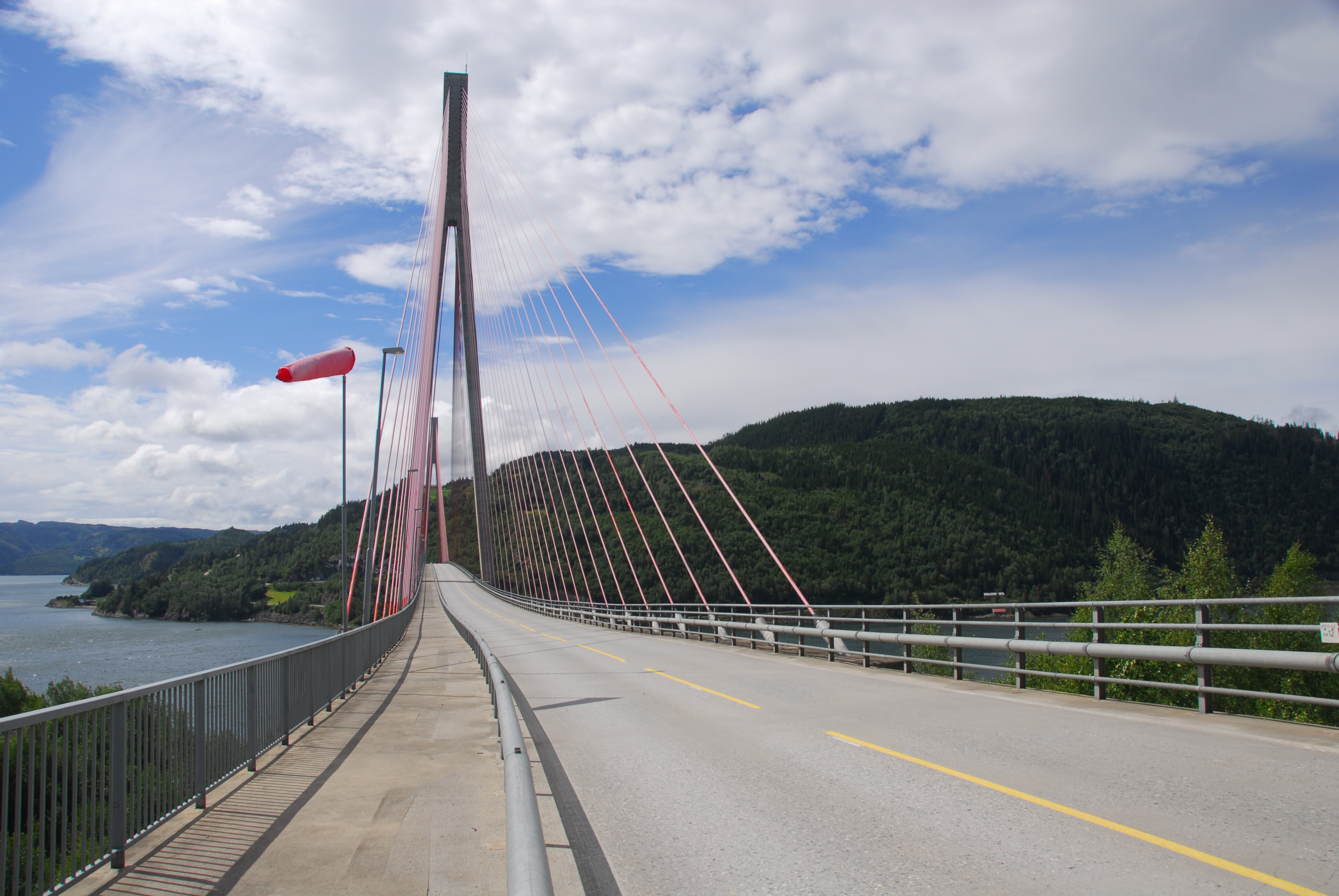
The Skarnsund Bridge looking west

The bridge is one of the world's longest cable-stayed bridges, with a length of 1,010 metres (3,310 ft). The span is 530 metres (1,740 ft), while the two towers are 152 metres (499 ft) above sea level. The deck is 2.15 metres (7.1 ft) deep, and 13 metres (43 ft) wide, with two lanes for automobiles and one for pedestrians and bicycles. It is the longest concrete cable-stayed span. The sailing height is 45 metres (148 ft). The bridge was, on its completion, the longest cable-stayed bridge in the world by the length of main span, but has since lost the title.

The original construction work also included 1.6 kilometres (1.0 mi) of new road, including a resting place on the Mosvik side. In the construction of the bridge, 19,600 cubic metres (25,600 cu yd) concrete was used and the 208 cables, with a total length of 33 kilometres (21 mi), weighed 1,030 tonnes (1,010 long tons; 1,140 short tons). The cables have diameters varying between 52 and 85 millimetres (2.0 and 3.3 in) and can, if needed, be replaced separately. The bridge's foundations are bedrock below the seabed under each tower. The bridge was built to withstand winds up to 48.5 metres per second (159 ft/s) (century storms) and has been designed to withstand earthquakes.

== Financing ==
Toll collection started the day after the opening, and lasted until 24 May 2007. Seventy percent of the costs were to be covered by the state, and thirty percent through toll fees. The debt was borrowed by the private company that was given a concession to operate a toll plaza on the Inderøy side. Including interest, NOK 80 million was collected, and the bridge was paid off three years before schedule. The Vanvikan-based company was disestablished following the closure of the plaza. Until only a few years before the closing, it was the only toll plaza in Nord-Trøndelag. There were several price increases during the toll period. The bridge was free for pedestrians and cyclists, but all motor vehicles were charged, although discounts were available for frequent travelers. The plaza was staffed, and did not take into use Autopass, like many other plazas.

== See also ==
- List of longest cable-stayed bridge spans
- List of tallest bridges in the world
