= Meltingvatnet =

Lake in Trøndelag, Norway

- Meltingen
- Interactive map of the lake
- Location: Indre Fosen and Inderøy, Trøndelag
- Coordinates: 63.7732°N 10.7843°E
- Primary inflows: Sagtjønna lake
- Primary outflows: Mossa river
- Basin countries: Norway
- Max. length: 7 kilometres (4.3 mi)
- Max. width: 3 kilometres (1.9 mi)
- Surface area: 8.85 km^{2} (3.42 sq mi)
- Shore length^{1}: 40.12 kilometres (24.93 mi)
- Surface elevation: 217 metres (712 ft)
- References: NVE
- ^{1} Shore length is not a well-defined measure.

Meltingvatnet is a lake on the border of Indre Fosen Municipality and Inderøy Municipality in Trøndelag county, Norway. The lake is a reservoir that holds water for the Mosvik power plant. The water flows out of the lake into the Mossa river which flows into the village of Mosvik.

== See also ==
- List of lakes in Norway
