= Norwegian County Road 715 =

Road in Norway

County Road 715
- Bokmål: Fylkesvei 715; Nynorsk: Fylkesveg 715

Major junctions
- South end: Trondheim
- North end: Fv17 south of Sjøåsen

Location
- Country: Norway

Highway system
- Roads in Norway; National Roads; County Roads

County Road 715 runs from Trondheim to a terminus at County Road 17 south of Sjøåsen.

== Route ==
County Road 715 begins on the west side of Trondheim at a roundabout at the end of the Ilsvik Tunnel. The road then runs west along the south shore of the Trondheimsfjord before crossing the Trondheimsfjord by the Flakk-Rørvik ferry. Reaching the north shore of the fjord, the road runs northeastward along the shore before turning inland at Vanvikan. Proceeding generally northwestward, the road parallels the southernmost shore of the lake Storvatnet before meeting County Road 718 in a T-intersection. The road then becomes the right branch of the "T" and runs northeast through the valley of the Skaua, crossing from the left to right bank of the Skaua before turning northward until it reaches Åfjord. From Åfjord, Route 715 branches off to the right and parallels the Norddaselva and Hofstaddalsselva rivers before reaching the shore of the Norwegian Sea west of Steinsdalen. Passing through Steinsdalen, the road follows the valley of the Luna river eastward and crosses two branches of the Øysterelva river before ending at County Road 17 at a T-intersection upstream from Sjøasen.
