= Norwegian County Road 755 =

Road in Trøndelag, Norway

County Road 755
- Bokmål: Fylkesvei 755; Nynorsk: Fylkesveg 755

Route information
- Maintained by Statens vegvesen
- Length: 91.2 km (56.7 mi)

Major junctions
- East end: E6
- Fv761 in Straumen; Skarnsund Bridge
- West end: Fv715

Location
- Country: Norway
- Counties: Trøndelag
- Major cities: Straumen, Mosvik, Leksvik, Vanvikan

Highway system
- Roads in Norway; National Roads; County Roads
← Fv754	→ Fv756

Norwegian County Road 755 (Norwegian: Fylkesvei 755) is a county road in Trøndelag, Norway. The 91.2-kilometre (56.7 mi) road runs from the village of Røra in Inderøy Municipality to the village of Vanvikan in Indre Fosen Municipality. It was known as Norwegian National Road 755 (Riksvei 755) before 2010 when control of the road was transferred from the national government to the county.

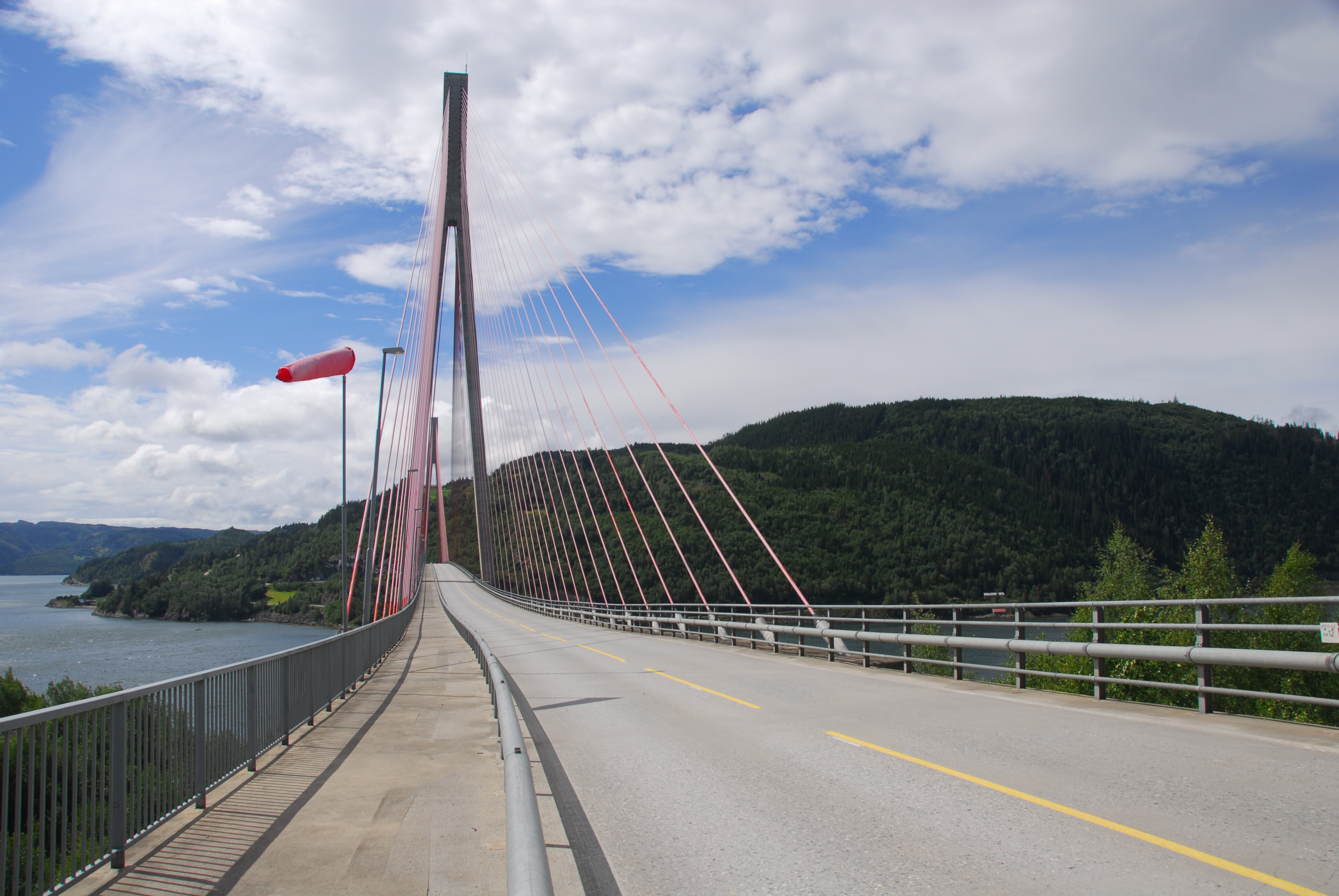
The Skarnsund Bridge

== Route ==
The road branches off from European route E6 at Røra in Inderøy. It passes through the villages of Straumen and Utøy in Inderøy. At Straumen, it passes over the historic Straumen Bridge, and has an intersection with County Road 761. At the Skarnsund strait that's part of the Trondheimsfjord, the road passes over the Skarnsund Bridge. From 1958 to 1991, this was served by the Vangshylla–Kjerringvik Ferry and then when the bridge was completed in 1991, the ferry route was discontinued. The bridge had a toll from 1991 until 2007. County Road 755 bypasses the village of Mosvik and intersects with a county road at Meltingen. In Indre Fosen, the road passes through the villages of Leksvik and Vanvikan, before terminating at County Road 715 west of Vanvikan.
