= Brekstad–Valset Ferry =

Ferry service in Trøndelag, Norway

Coordinates: 63.6667°N 9.6833°E

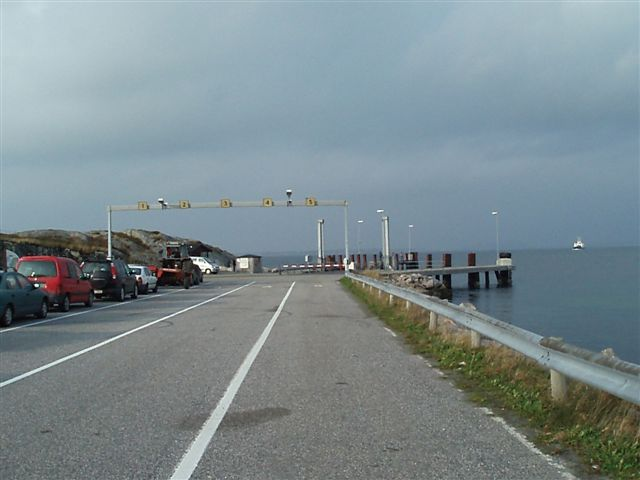
- Valset
- Waterway: Trondheimsfjorden
- Transit type: Double-ended
- Route: Fv710
- Carries: Automobiles and passengers
- Terminals: Brekstad; Valset
- Operator: Tide Sjø
- Authority: Norwegian Public Roads Administration
- Began operation: 1977
- Travel time: 20 min
- Headway: 60 min
- Frequency: 17 / day
- No. of vessels: MF Ørland
- Daily ridership: 400 (2007)
- Daily vehicles: 407 (2007)

The Brekstad–Valset Ferry is an automobile ferry in Trøndelag county, Norway. The ferry is part of the Norwegian County Road 710 as it crosses the Trondheimsfjorden, connecting the town of Brekstad in Ørland Municipality on the Fosen peninsula to the village of Valset in Orkland Municipality. The 5.6 kilometres (3.5 mi) passage is performed with the double-ended ferries MF Ørland and operated by Tide Sjø making 17 crossings in each direction each day taking 20 minutes.

The ferry route started in 1977, and was operated by Fosen Trafikklag until 2007, when it lost the public service obligation contract to Tide Sjø.

Starting in 2019, the route will be operated by Fjord1 and two of the ferries will be battery electric.
