= Skarnsundet =

Strait in Trøndelag county, Norway

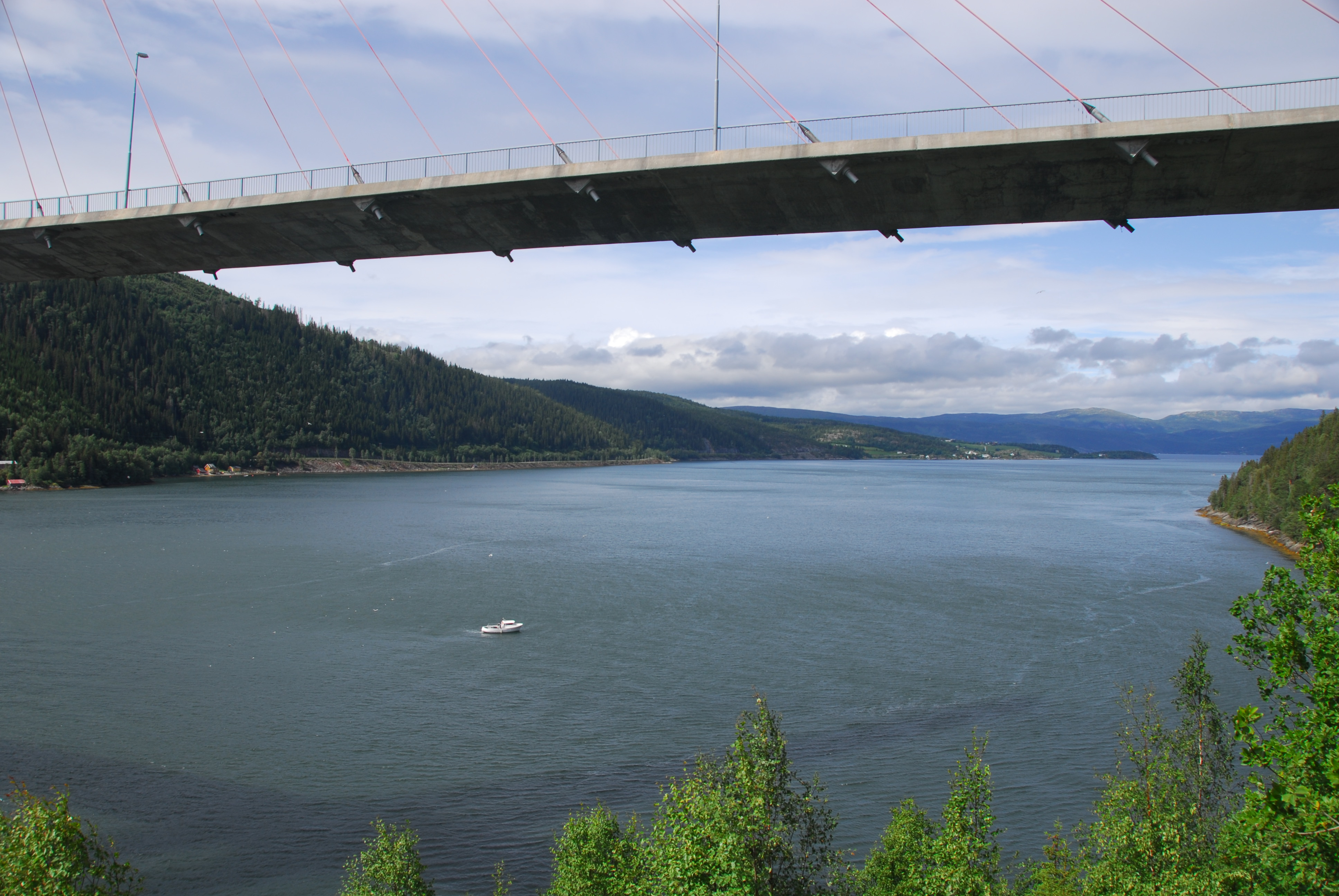
- View of the strait
- Interactive map of the fjord
- Location: Trøndelag county, Norway
- Coordinates: 63.8661°N 11.0560°E
- Type: Strait
- Primary inflows: Beitstadfjorden
- Primary outflows: Trondheimsfjorden
- Basin countries: Norway
- Max. length: 5 kilometres (3.1 mi)
- Max. width: 0.5 kilometres (0.31 mi)
- Settlements: Venneshamn

Skarnsundet is a strait in the Trondheimsfjord in Trøndelag county, Norway. The strait connects the Beitstadfjorden with the outer section of the Trondheimsfjorden. The 5-kilometre (3.1 mi) long and 0.5-kilometre (0.31 mi) wide Skarnsund is located in Inderøy Municipality. On the northeastern side of the strait is the village of Vangshylla and on the southwestern side is the villages of Venneshamn and Kjerringvik. The strait has a strong tidal current with a maelstrom.

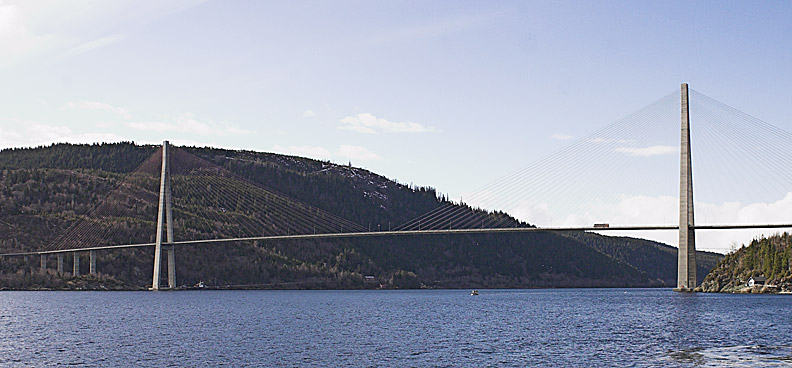
The south entrance to Skarnsundet, as seen from Vangshylla, with Skarnsund Bridge clearly visible.

The Skarnsund strait was crossed by the Vangshylla–Kjerringvik Ferry (car ferry), operated by Innherredsferja, prior to 19 December 1991. On that date the new 1,010-metre (3,310 ft) long Skarnsund Bridge was opened. The bridge is part of Norwegian County Road 755. Skarnsund is a noted site for both sports fishing and underwater diving.
