= Kjerringvika =

Village in Inderøy Municipality, Norway

- Village
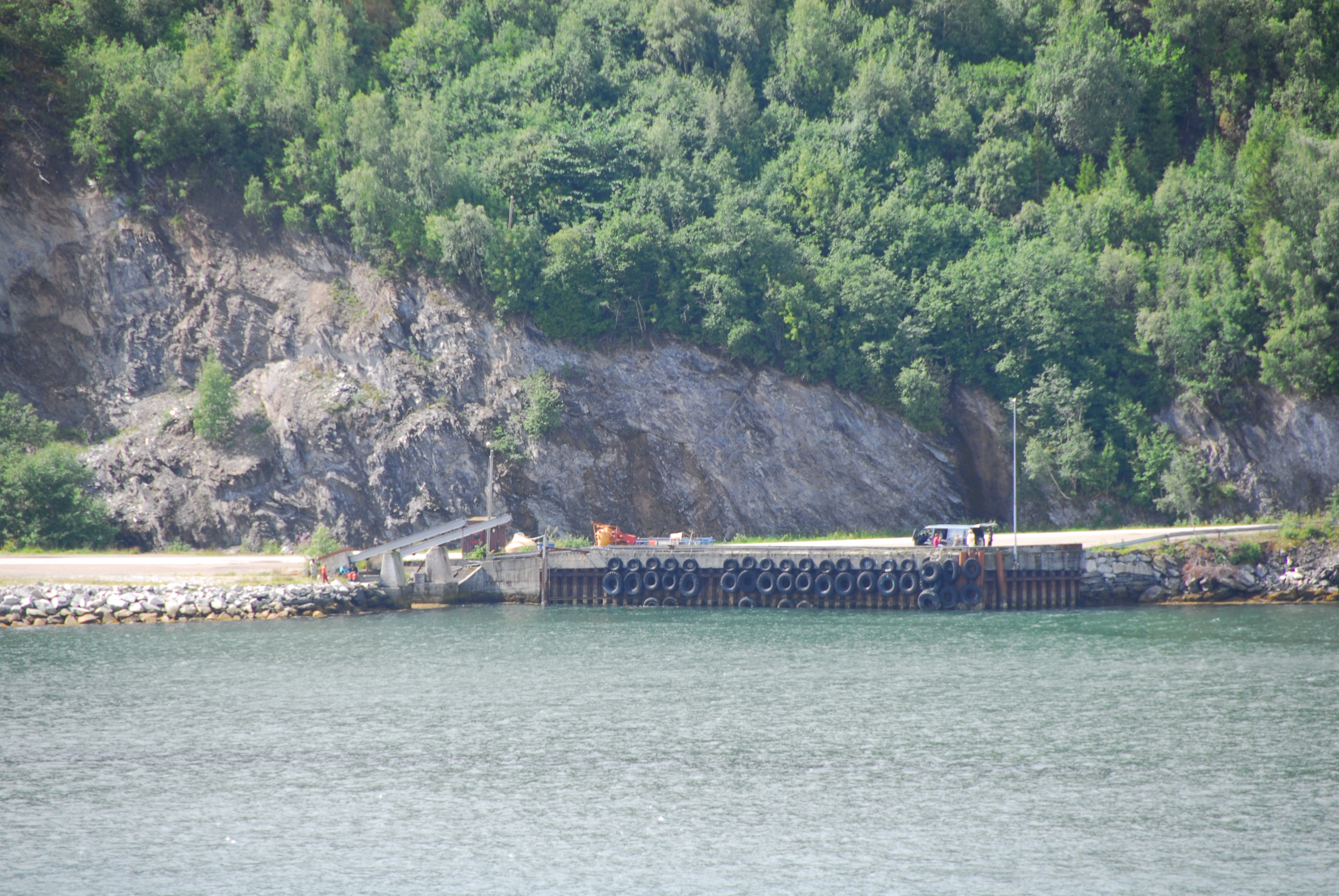
- View of the old ferry quay
- Interactive map of Kjerringvika
- Location within Trøndelag Location within Norway
- Coordinates: 63.8415°N 11.0688°E
- Country: Norway
- Region: Central Norway
- County: Trøndelag
- District: Innherred
- Municipality: Inderøy Municipality
- Elevation: 15 m (49 ft)
- Time zone: UTC+01:00 (CET)
  - Summer (DST): UTC+02:00 (CEST)
- Post Code: 7690 Mosvik

Kjerringvika is a village located in Inderøy Municipality in Trøndelag county, Norway. It is located on the shore of the Trondheimsfjord at the Skarnsundet strait, about 5 kilometres (3.1 mi) northeast of the village of Mosvik.

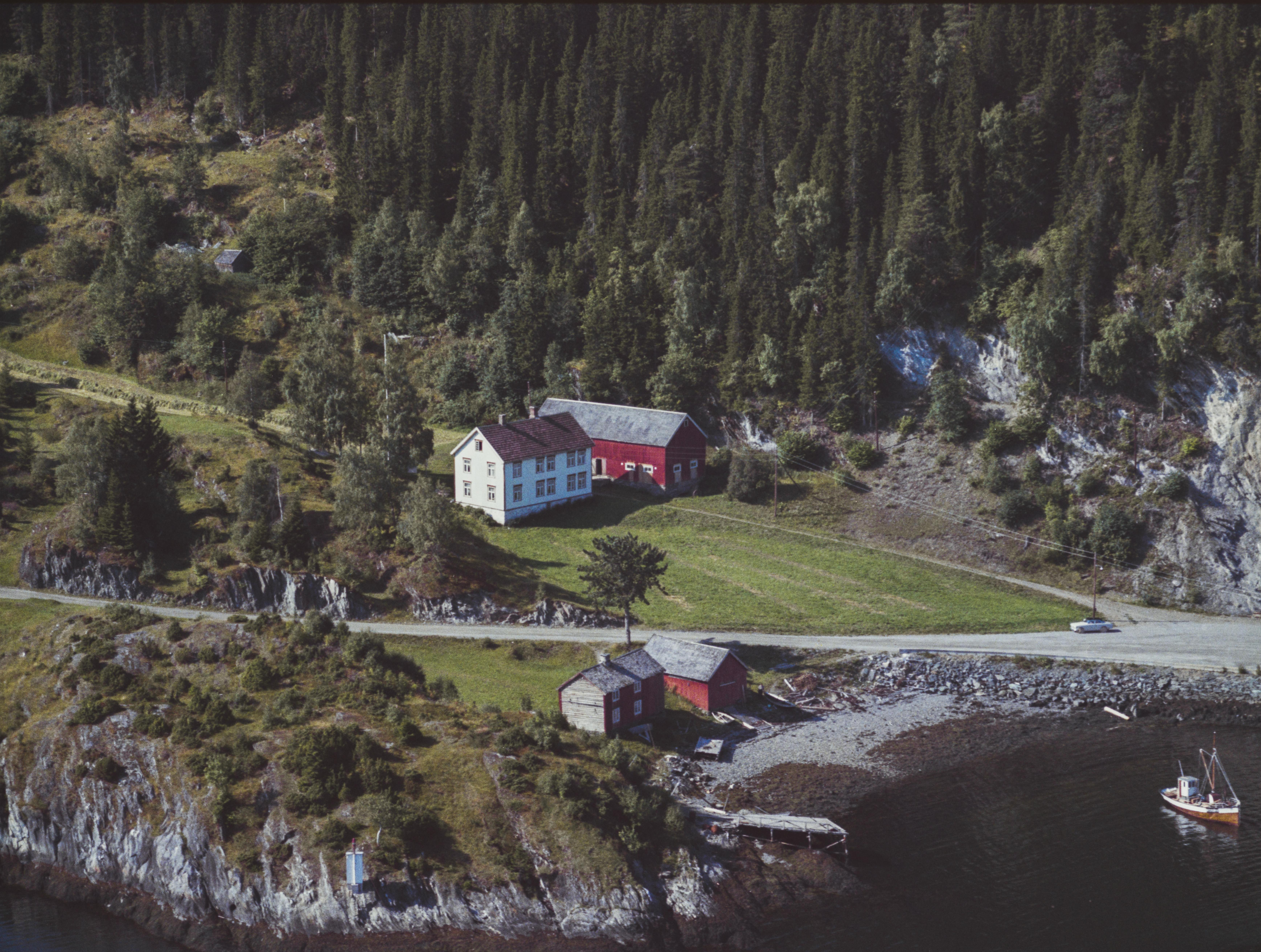
Kjerringvik in 1961. The ferry quay is immediately to the right of the photo.

The village is located along the Norwegian County Road 755 at the western end of the Skarnsund Bridge. The bridge was built in 1991 to replace the old Vangshylla–Kjerringvik Ferry which was in service from 1958 to 1991. The first six years of service also included a ferry connection to the town of Levanger. In 1991, the ferry service was replaced by the Skarnsund Bridge. The old ferry quay has since been taken into use as a tug boat base.
