= Mosvik (village) =

Village in Inderøy Municipality, Norway

- Village
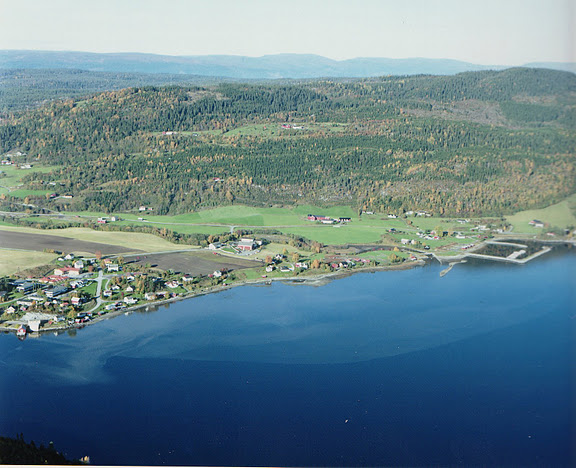
- View of the village
- Interactive map of Mosvik
- Location within Trøndelag Location within Norway
- Coordinates: 63.8212°N 11.0049°E
- Country: Norway
- Region: Central Norway
- County: Trøndelag
- District: Innherred
- Municipality: Inderøy Municipality

Area
  - Total: 0.48 km^{2} (0.19 sq mi)
- Elevation: 11 m (36 ft)

Population (2023)
  - Total: 298
  - Density: 621/km^{2} (1,610/sq mi)
- Time zone: UTC+01:00 (CET)
  - Summer (DST): UTC+02:00 (CEST)
- Post Code: 7690 Mosvik

Mosvik is a village in Inderøy Municipality in Trøndelag county, Norway. The village is located on the western shore of the Trondheimsfjorden, just south of the Skarnsundet strait and the Skarnsund Bridge. The island of Ytterøya lies offshore about 3 kilometres (1.9 mi) southeast of the village of Mosvik. Mosvik Church is located in the village. From 1901 until 2012, the village was the administrative centre of the old Mosvik Municipality.

The 0.48-square-kilometre (120-acre) village had a population (2023) of 298 and a population density of 621 inhabitants per square kilometre (1,610/sq mi). Since 2023, the population and area data for this village area has not been separately tracked by Statistics Norway.
