= Hokstad =

Village in Levanger Municipality, Norway

- Village
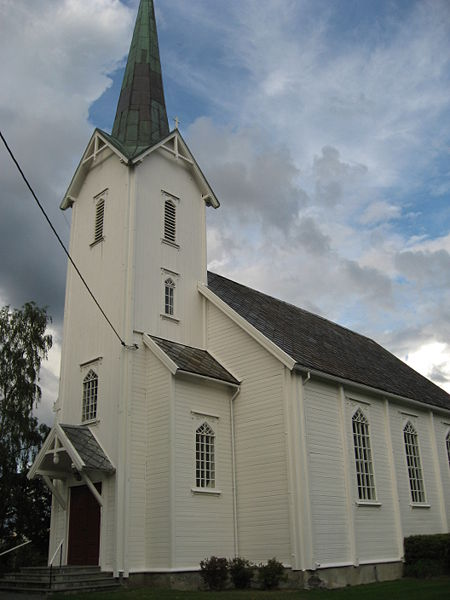
- View of the church near Hokstad
- Interactive map of Hokstad
- Location within Trøndelag Location within Norway
- Coordinates: 63.7982°N 11.1681°E
- Country: Norway
- Region: Central Norway
- County: Trøndelag
- District: Innherred
- Municipality: Levanger Municipality
- Elevation: 3 m (9.8 ft)
- Time zone: UTC+01:00 (CET)
  - Summer (DST): UTC+02:00 (CEST)
- Post Code: 7629 Ytterøy

Hokstad is a small village and ferry quay on the island of Ytterøya in Levanger Municipality in Trøndelag county, Norway. The Levanger–Hokstad Ferry connects Hokstad on the island to the town of Levanger on the mainland. Ytterøy Church lies just to the north of the village.
