= Ytterøya =

Island in Trøndelag, Norway

- Interactive map of Ytterøya

Geography
- Location: Trøndelag, Norway
- Coordinates: 63.8155°N 11.2209°E
- Area: 28 km^{2} (11 sq mi)
- Length: 13.5 km (8.39 mi)
- Width: 4.3 km (2.67 mi)
- Highest elevation: 210 m (690 ft)
- Highest point: Sandstadkammen

Administration
- Norway
- County: Trøndelag
- Municipality: Levanger Municipality

Demographics
- Population: 600 (2018)

Ytterøya is an island in the Trondheimsfjord in Levanger Municipality in Trøndelag county, Norway. The 15-kilometre (9.3 mi) long island has an area of 27.8 square kilometres (10.7 sq mi) has about 600 residents (as of 2018). The highest point is the 210-metre (690 ft) tall Sanstadkammen. The island has good agricultural land and has settlements across the whole island.

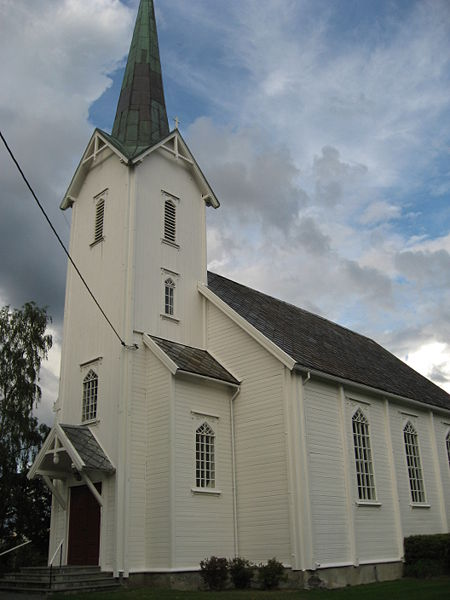
Ytterøy Church

The Levanger–Hokstad Ferry connects the village of Hokstad on the island to the town of Levanger on the mainland. Ytterøy Church is located on the island.

== History ==
The old Ytterøy Municipality encompassed this island and some of the lands around it. Ytterøya has many burial mounds from the Stone Age. The island is famous for its dense roe deer population, and a popular hunting area for hunters from Scandinavia and Germany. In the middle to late 19th century sulphur was exported to all of Europe from the mines here.

== See also ==
- List of islands of Norway
