= Innherred =

Traditional district in Trøndelag, Norway

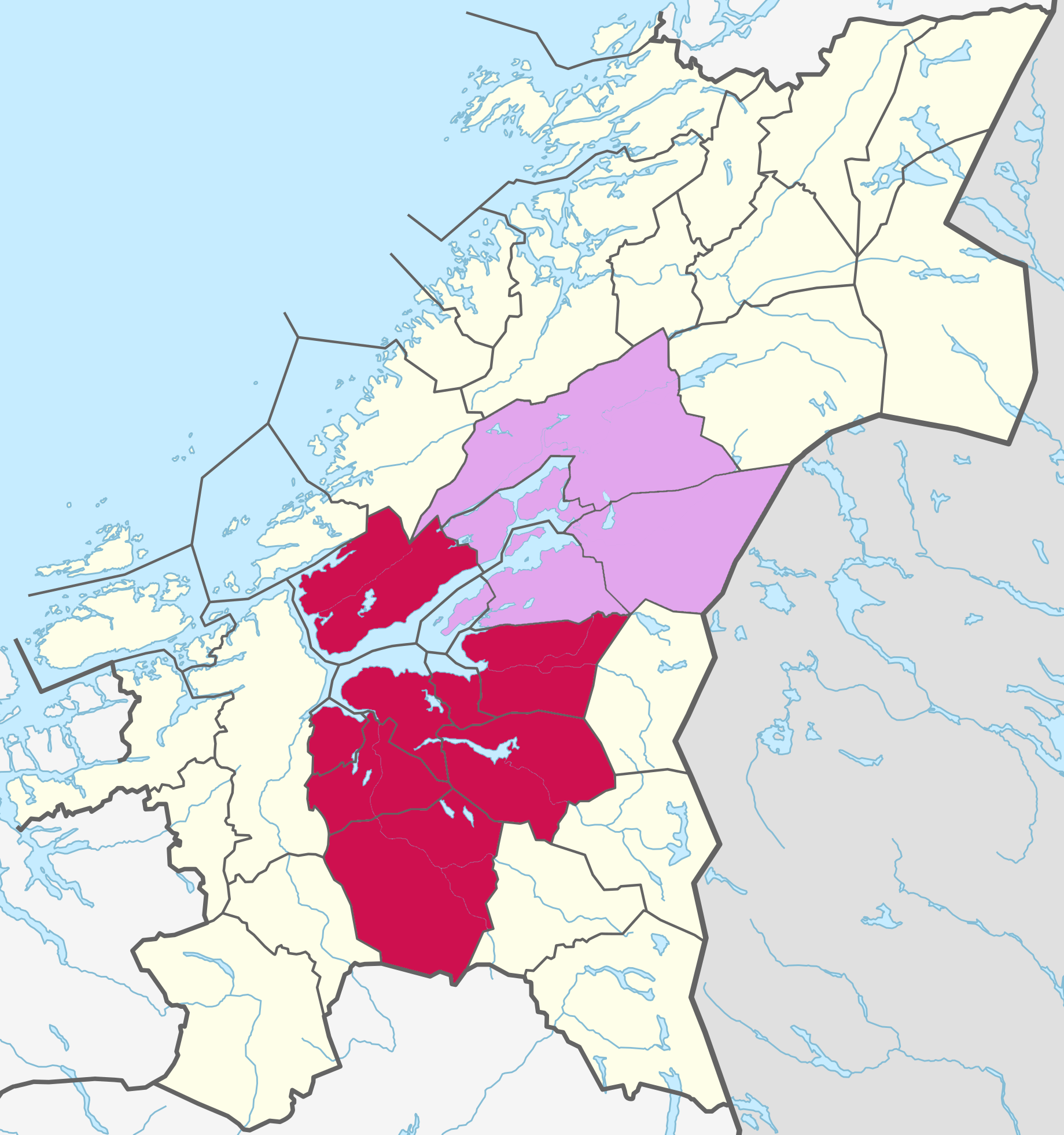
Current map of Innherred, marked in light purple, after various county and municipality merges in 2019-22. Compare and contrast with the Trondheim Region, which is marked in dark red.

Map of Innherred in Nord-Trøndelag before the 2019 county merger. The leftmost part of the map shows a part of what is today Indre Fosen Municipality in the Trondheim Region.

Innherred or Innherad is a traditional district in Trøndelag county in the central part of Norway. It consists of the areas around the inner part of the Trondheimsfjord in the central-east part of the county. The district includes the municipalities of Levanger, Frosta, Verdal, Inderøy, and Steinkjer. Historically, the municipalities of Snåsa and Namdalseid have sometimes also been included in the Innherred district. The area encompasses about 7,913 square kilometres (3,055 sq mi) and about 68,062 residents (2004). There are several larger towns/cities in Innherred including Steinkjer, Levanger, and Verdalsøra.

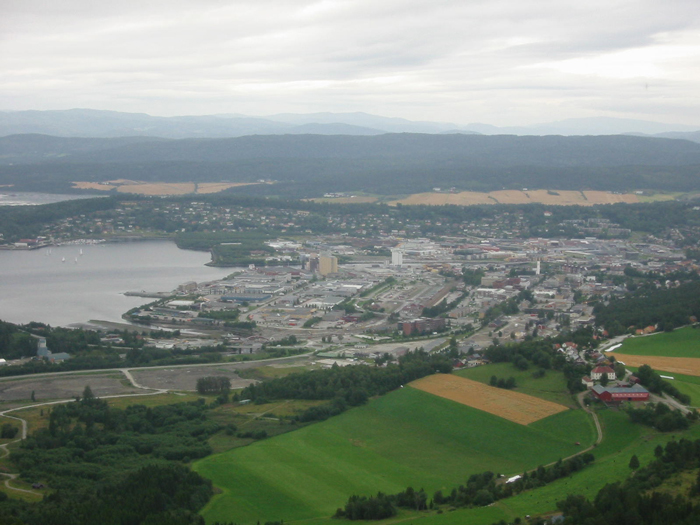
The city of Steinkjer.

The district is only a traditional geographical district, it has no administrative or governmental functions. Innherred is bordered by the district of Namdalen, to the east by Sweden, to the south by the district of Stjørdalen, and to the west by the district of Fosen.

The general Steinkjer-Levanger-Verdal area used to be the political centre of the old county of Nord-Trøndelag, and continues to serve as a de facto northern counterpart to the greater Trondheim area. However, attempts to solidify the Innherred region have generally failed; a referendum in 2016 to combine the municipalities of Levanger and Verdal, whose main towns were just 10 kilometres (6.2 mi) away from each other, and which would've seen Levanger increase from the 62nd most populated municipality in Norway to approximately 30th, was overwhelmingly rejected in Verdal.

Historically, the district was a base for the Denmark-Norway's 1st Trondheim Infantry Regiment.
