= Kjerringberget =

Mountain in Trøndelag, Norway

Coordinates: 63.45207°N 10.43719°E

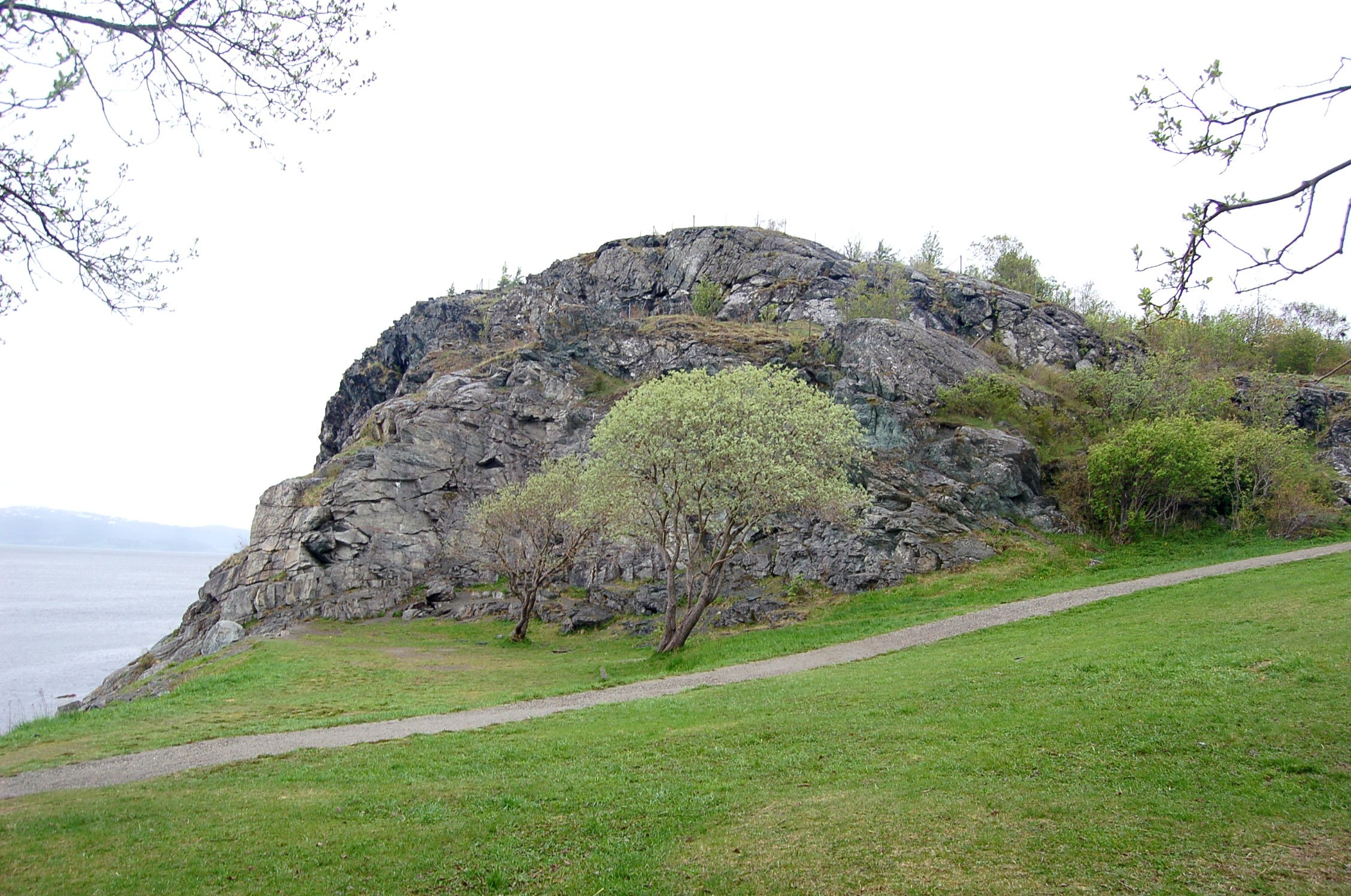
Kjerringberget

Kjerringberget is a hill located in the Lade area of the city of Trondheim within Trondheim Municipality in Trøndelag county, Norway. The small mountain is about 45 metres (148 ft) above sea level. The Ladestien trail, which goes from Ladehammeren to Rotvoll, crosses Kjerringberget. The top of Kjerringberget provides a view over western Trondheim, Munkholmen, Trondheimsfjord, and Fosen.

Kjerringberget partly consists of green rocks formed when subterranean magma solidified after flowing out and coming into contact with water, forming pillow lavas. These lavas were later cross-cut by intrusions of trondhjemite. Bymarka west of Trondheim also has similar geological structures, both forming part of the early Ordovician Bymarka ophiolite.

Kjerringberget also has some connections to World War II. Stone from Kjerringberget was used to build a mole in Korsvika. The mole was never finished because the war ended prior to its completion.
