= Petter Lie =

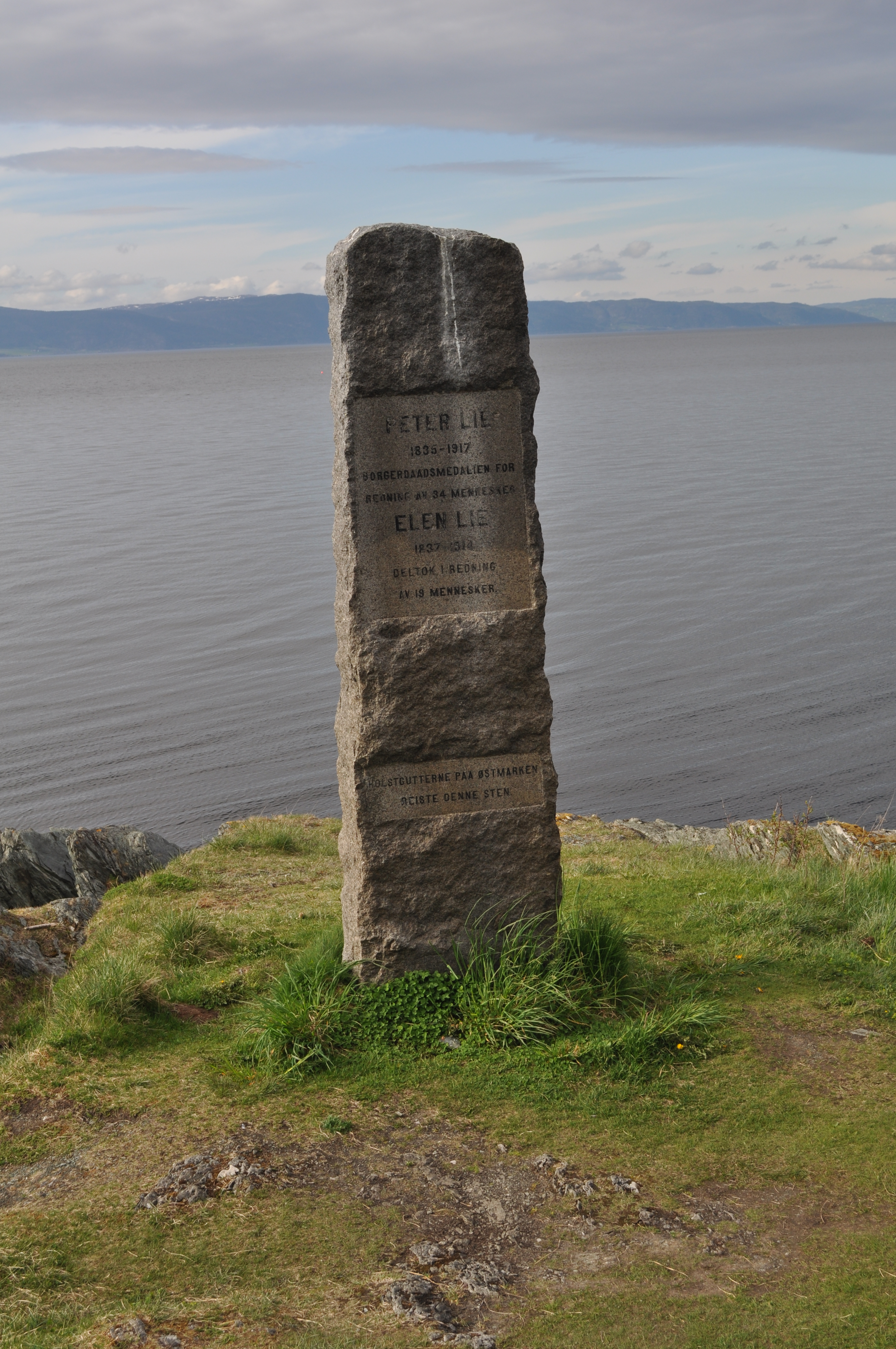
Monument on Ladestien in Trondheim

Petter Lie (1835–1917) was a Norwegian sailor and fisherman.

Petter Lie was born in the neighbourhood of Bakklandet in Trondheim, Norway. In 1861 he became engaged to Ellen Johanna Hagen (1833–1914). After their marriage, they moved into a house at Østmarkneset on the peninsula of Lade in the northwest part of Trondheim. Petter, Ellen and their four daughters made a living by fishing and selling the fish at the Ravnkloa fish market.

From their home, Petter and Ellen had a view of the Trondheimsfjord as it passes by the city of Trondheim. They could quickly see if anything unusual was happening. When people had problems in their boats, help was not far away. Petter was an eager rescuer who also was helped by his wife. All together, Petter Lie saved 34 people from drowning. In 1879, Petter received a medallion in silver when these effort were recognized by the public. Ellen and Petter have separate roads named after them on Østmarka. In 1937 a memorial stone in memory of Petter and Ellen was raised on Ladestien.
