= Kindt =

Kindt is a surname. It is of German origin and it means child.

It may refer to:

- Adèle Kindt (1804–1884), Belgian painter
- Christian Sommer Kindt (1815–1903), Norwegian physician and botanical collector; father of Olaf Berg Kindt
- David Kindt (c. 1580–1652), German painter
- Don Kindt (Sr.) (1925–2000), U.S. American football player
- Don Kindt, Jr. (born 1961), U.S. American football player
- Edvard Kindt-Larsen (1901–1982), Danish architect and furniture designer
- Harri Kindt (1923–1983), Finnish bank manager and vice judge
- Hilda Sofie Kindt (1881–1966), Norwegian civil servant and politician
- Jean-Michel Kindt (born ?), French actor
- John Warren Kindt (born ?), U.S. American professor, author, and gambling critic
- Knut Kindt (1886–1967), Finnish land surveying engineer and politician
- Lawrence Kindt (1901–1973), Canadian economist and politician
- Matt Kindt (born 1973), U.S. American comic book writer, artist, and graphic designer
- Olaf Berg Kindt (1850–1935), Norwegian physician; son of Christian Sommer Kindt
- Olaf Trampe Kindt (1913–1995), Norwegian barrister
- Otto Kindt (1909-2006), German architect
