= Nobo =

Nobo may refer to:

- Nobø, a Norwegian manufacturing company
- Nobó, an Irish brand of dairy-free ice cream
- Abbreviation of Notified Body, an organisation that has been designated by a Member State to assess the conformity of certain products, before being placed on the E.U. market, with the applicable essential technical requirements
- NoBo (portmanteau of North Boardman), a residential neighborhood in Traverse City, Michigan
