= Andreas Moe (politician) =

Norwegian politician (1883–1956)

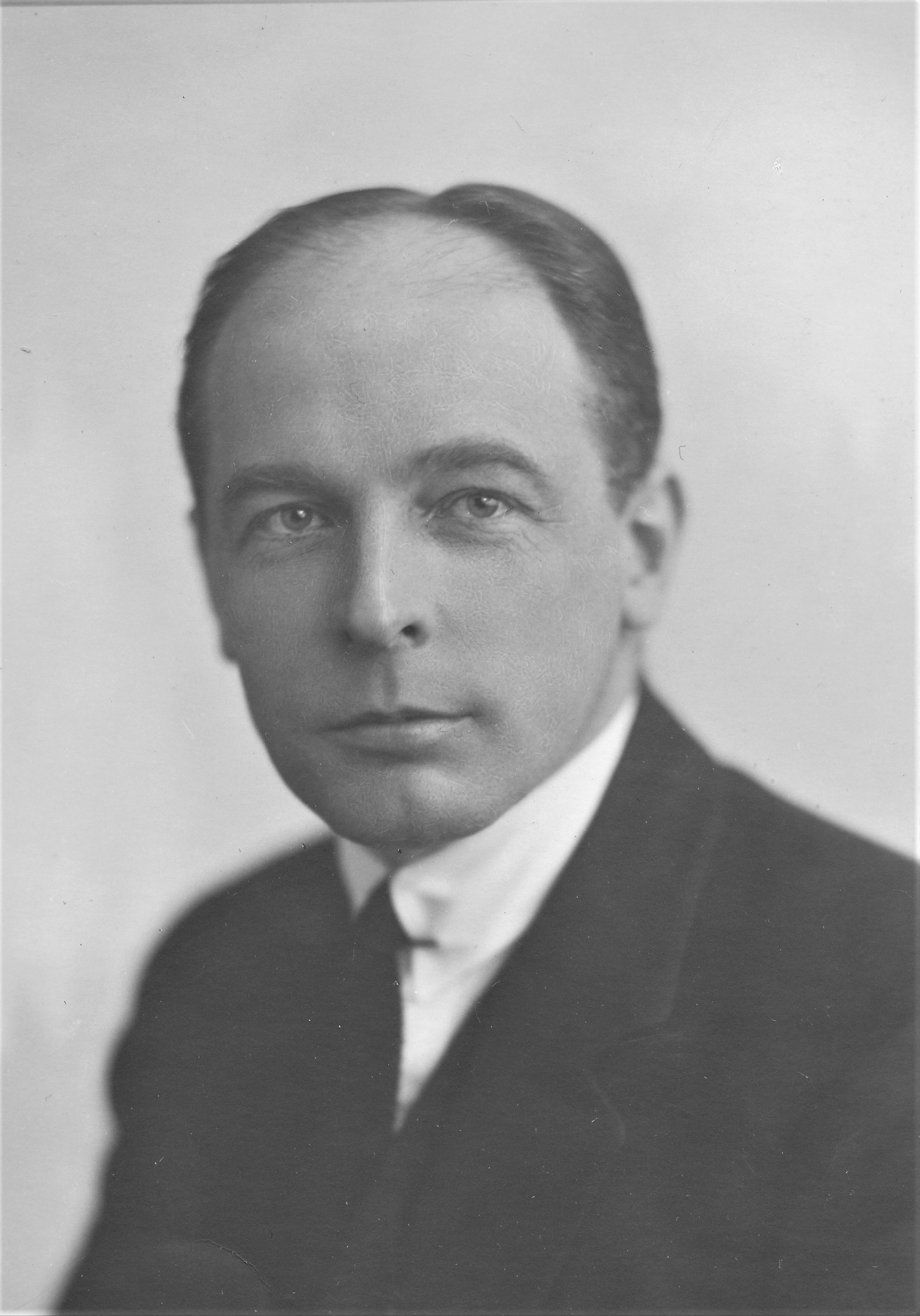
Andreas Moe, 1930

Andreas Moe (3 October 1883 – 7 July 1956) was a Norwegian merchant and politician for the Conservative Party.

He graduated from middle school in 1898, from Kristiania Handelsgymnasium i 1902 and completed further business education in France, England and Germany during 1903–1904. I 1905 he was hired in the family firm Andreas Moe Glas & Stentøy, where he served as manager from 1907, partner from 1918 and sole proprietor from 1936.

From 1917 to 1934 Moe served in Trondheim municipal council (bystyre) and the executive board (formannskap), and as mayor (ordfører) from 1926 to 1930. During the years Moe served as mayor, the Trondheim municipal council and executive board moved from Rådstuen (Council hall) i Kongens gate 2 to the present-day city hall in Munkegata 1. The issue regarding the name of the city was raised in the municipal council at several times during the period of Moe’s mayorship. Olavsjubileet and Trøndelagsutstillingen (the Trøndelag trade exhibit) were significant events during his time as mayor.

Other offices held by Andreas Moe includes honorary consul to Spain from 1912 to 1924, chairman of the trade society Trondhjem Handelstands Forening from 1918 to 1933, board member of the trade association Norges Handelstands Forbund from 1925 to 1933, chairman of the trade association Norges Glass- og Stentøyshandleres Forbund from 1915 to 1919 and 1925 to 1929, chairman of the supervisory board for the newspaper Adresseavisen A/S, from 1927 to 1956, chairman for Østmarka hospital from 1932 to 1956, member of Børskomiteén (stock exchange committee) in 1939 and chairman in 1945, member of the directory of Trondhjems Sparebank in 1928 and chairman from 1942 to 1953, and member of the board of the steamboat company Det Nordenfjeldske Dampskibselsskab from 1942 to 1949 and chairman from 1946.

During World War II, on 4 October 1944, Andreas Moe was arrested and imprisoned at Vollan until 24 October, when he was transferred to Berg internment and prisoner of war camp near Tønsberg. He stayed imprisoned there until his release on 28 March 1945.

Andreas Moe was a knight of the French Legion of Honour (Légion d’honneur)

He is buried at Vår Frue Church cemetery in Trondheim.
