= Steinar Krogstad =

Norwegian politician (born 1960)

Steinar Krogstad (born 12 November 1960) is a Norwegian trade unionist and politician for the Labour Party.

He hails from Trondheim, living at Svartlamoen for the first three years of his life and then at Nidarvoll. His father worked at Nobø and his mother eventually found work as a shop clerk. Krogstad did not fit into the 1960s and 70s school system, and became a carpenter. While an apprentice in Jernbeton, he joined the trade union and was elected representative in 1981. He was a member of the Socialist Youth and the Socialist Left Party at the time. Krogstad joined the Labour Party in 2013.

Krogstad eventually joined the national leadership of the trade union movement. He became a central board member of the United Federation of Trade Unions in 2007 and deputy leader in 2015. He then became second deputy leader of the national trade union center, the Norwegian Confederation of Trade Unions in 2022.

He was elected as a deputy representative to the Parliament of Norway from Sør-Trøndelag for the term 2021–2025. In 2023 he surpassed 100 days of parliamentary session.
