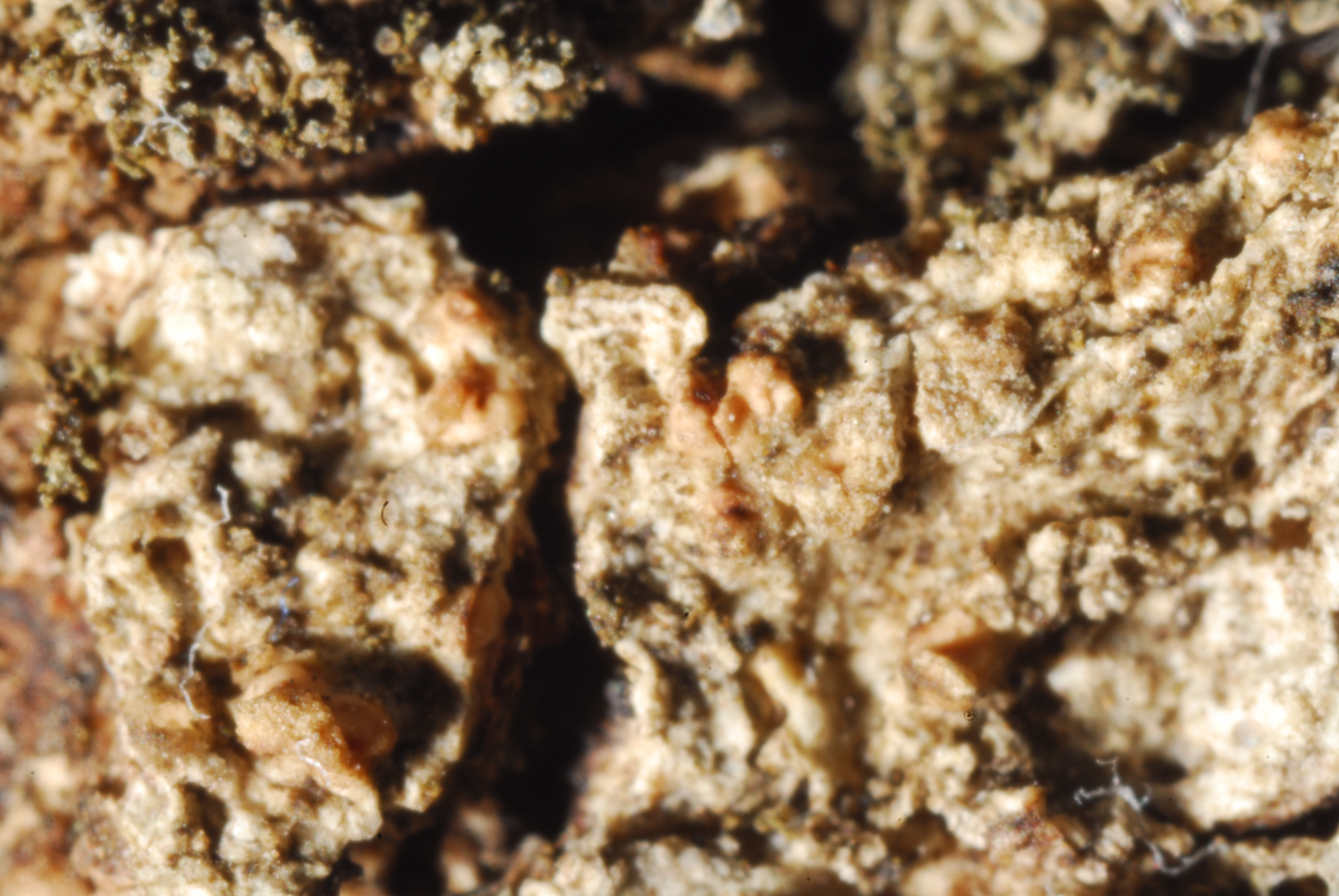

Scientific classification
- Kingdom: Fungi
- Division: Ascomycota
- Class: Lecanoromycetes
- Order: Gyalectales
- Family: Gyalectaceae
- Genus: Clathroporinopsis; M.Choisy (1929)
- Species: C. nidarosiensis

Binomial name
- Clathroporinopsis nidarosiensis (Kindt) P.F.Cannon (2024)

Synonyms
- Microglaena nidarosiensis Kindt (1884); Clathroporina calcarea Walt.Watson (1925); Belonia nidarosiensis (Kindt) P.M.Jørg. & Vězda (1983); Gyalecta nidarosiensis (Kindt) Baloch & Lücking (2013)

= Clathroporinopsis =

Single-species fungal genus

Clathroporinopsis is a single-species fungal genus in the family Gyalectaceae. Its sole species, Clathroporinopsis nidarosiensis, is a crustose lichen that grows on dry, rain-sheltered calcareous rock and masonry in western, northern, and parts of central Europe, as well as Iceland. The lichen forms a thin, pink-orange crust whose photobiont belongs to the green algal genus Trentepohlia. Fruiting bodies are uncommon, and the species is often encountered as broad sterile patches that can be mistaken for algal films. The genus name was coined by Maurice Choisy in 1929 but remained obscure for decades; the species passed through Clathroporina, Belonia, and Gyalecta before molecular and morphological evidence led to the recognition of Clathroporinopsis as a distinct genus in 2024.

== Taxonomy ==
Clathroporinopsis was introduced by Maurice Choisy in 1929 in a handwritten but nomenclaturally valid publication, but no species was formally transferred to the genus at that time. Because the protologue was brief and difficult to interpret, the name remained obscure for decades. The species now placed in Clathroporinopsis had, however, already been described under two different names. Christian Sommer Kindt described Microglaena nidarosiensis from material collected at Ladehammeren near Trondheim, characterizing it as a thin whitish cracked crust with very small immersed fruiting bodies and pale muriform spores tapered at both ends. British material from calcareous substrata at Winchcombe in Gloucestershire and at Dovedale was later described by Walter Watson in 1925 as Clathroporina calcarea.

In a 1983 reappraisal, Per Magnus Jørgensen, Antonín Vězda, and Arne Botnen concluded that Microglaena nidarosiensis and Clathroporina calcarea represented the same species. They transferred the taxon to Belonia as Belonia nidarosiensis, arguing that it was more closely allied to that genus than to either Microglaena or Clathroporina as then understood.

In a 1997 study of Belonia, Pere Navarro-Rosinés and Xavier Llimona treated Belonia caudata as the same species as B. nidarosiensis, regarding the reported differences in spore shape and substrate as too slight and inconsistent to justify separation. The same authors also rejected the view that B. nidarosiensis was synonymous with Topelia rosea, noting that the two can be separated microscopically because Topelia has smaller, ellipsoidal spores and periphyses in the ascomata.

In 2013, Elisabeth Baloch, H. Thorsten Lumbsch, Robert Lücking, and Mats Wedin transferred the species to Gyalecta as Gyalecta nidarosiensis. The change followed phylogenetic work indicating that Belonia was nested within Gyalecta, and their synonymy included the earlier names Microglaena nidarosiensis, Belonia nidarosiensis, Clathroporina calcarea, and Clathroporina caudata.

Lücking and colleagues interpreted Choisy's original concept as referring to lichens with urceolate to perithecioid ascomata but a coherent, apothecioid hymenium. In their 2016 classification of lichenized fungi, they selected Clathroporina calcarea as the lectotype of Clathroporinopsis. Since C. calcarea is a synonym of the species then known as Gyalecta nidarosiensis, they treated Clathroporinopsis as a synonym of Gyalecta in the family Gyalectaceae.

Later molecular work showed that Gyalecta nidarosiensis belongs within a broader Gyalecta sensu lato lineage and is sister to G. herrei. Ertz and co-workers also observed that, if that broad assemblage were divided into smaller genera, the name Clathroporinopsis would be available for the lineage containing G. nidarosiensis. Cannon and colleagues adopted that narrower interpretation in 2024, recognizing Clathroporinopsis as a distinct monotypic genus and making the new combination Clathroporinopsis nidarosiensis. In that treatment, the genus is placed in the family Gyalectaceae.

== Description ==
As currently circumscribed, the genus is represented by a single species, so the generic description is effectively that of Clathroporinopsis nidarosiensis. The thallus (vegetative body) is a thin, usually superficial and widely spreading crust that is pink-orange when fresh and often fades to whitish cream in dried material. An early British field treatment described the thallus as often almost entirely dissolved into a shapeless, uneven, scurfy, crust. The surface is uneven, irregularly cracked, and finely powdery-granular, with granules about 20–30 μm across; the photobiont is Trentepohlia. Unlike Gyalecta amsterdamensis, which has well-defined, discrete soralia, Clathroporinopsis has a more uniformly powdery-granular surface. Sterile thalli may form broad orange-pink patches and can resemble other Trentepohlia-containing crusts.

The fruiting bodies (perithecia) are uncommon, scattered, pale pink, and more or less globose, measuring about 0.24–0.42 mm across, with a small apical pore that is usually closed in dry material but may open slightly when wet. Old emptied fruiting bodies often persist as small greyish crater-like structures and may be easier to notice in the field than fresh ones. The asci are usually 6–8-spored. The ascospores are colourless, elongate, and muriform, about 36–82 × 8–14 μm. They have numerous transverse septa, a slight constriction near the middle, and tapered ends. These muriform spores were used to separate the genus from Belonia, whose species have narrow, needle-like, transversely septate spores, though they are know known to both belong to the same broader Gyalecta sensu lato complex recovered by phylogenetic studies.

No lichen substances have been detected by thin-layer chromatography. Even sterile material (lacking fruiting bodies) can be recognized by its conspicuous dark pink to pink-orange, granular to mealy thallus with Trentepohlia as the photobiont. The species Opegrapha gyrocarpa and Gyalecta jenensis may produce somewhat similar pinkish patches, but differ in substrate, chemistry, or fruiting-body form.

== Habitat and distribution ==
Clathroporinopsis nidarosiensis is a saxicolous lichen of base-rich rock and masonry, especially calcareous substrates. It grows on dry, rain-sheltered vertical rock faces and overhangs, especially hard limestone but also calcareous mudstone. Norwegian material was found chiefly on base-rich mica-schists and greenstones. It also occurs on sheltered stone walls, including churchyard masonry, where it may form extensive sterile crusts. Among British sterile crustose lichens with Trentepohlia as the photobiont, this species is unusual in occurring on markedly basic substrates.

Colonies are usually on north- or north-east-facing rock overhangs, often in small crevices reached by trickling water rather than direct rainfall. In Switzerland, the lichen grew on shaded, humid outer walls of castle ruins, chiefly on north-facing calcareous masonry about 3–7 m above the ground. More generally, the paper described the species as favouring rain-sheltered vertical calcareous rock faces, overhangs, wall niches, and sometimes gravestones.

In Britain and Ireland it is described as widespread and locally frequent, although in the English Midlands and south-east England it is largely confined to churchyards. It is also locally common in south-west England, becoming more local in western and northern parts of Britain and Ireland, with records extending north to Shetland. On the European mainland, the material sequenced by Ertz and colleagues came from limestone in Belgium, confirming its occurrence beyond the British Isles. A 2015 report documented the species in central Switzerland, where it was found on the ruins of Nünegg Castle in the canton of Lucerne. The author described it as rare in Central Europe and associated with Atlantic climatic conditions, while summarizing earlier records from Britain, Ireland, north-western France, Belgium, Luxembourg, Germany, Austria, Sweden, and Norway. A 2005 excursion report added Germany to the known range, recording the species, under the name Belonia nidarosiensis, from the Auburg near Gerolstein in Rhineland-Palatinate. Aptroot described it there as an inconspicuous sterile crust on calcareous rock that is likely to be overlooked or mistaken for algae. The lichen is also known from Iceland, from Hunkubakkar west of Kirkjubæjarklaustur, where the specimen was collected on dry, slightly basic cliffs near a river at about 100 m elevation.
