= Hilda Sofie Kindt =

Norwegian politician (1881–1966)

Hilda Sofie Kindt (1 December 1881 – 5 October 1966) was a Norwegian civil servant and politician for the Conservative Party.

She was born in Trondhjem as a daughter of physician Olaf Berg Kindt (1850–1935) and Henriette Augusta Trampe (1854–1929). Her brother Kristian Sommer Kindt became a chief physician, her sister Anna Karoline married Lieutenant Colonel Jørgen Theodor Tandberg. She finished middle school in 1897 and a trade course in 1899. She was hired at the tax office in Trondhjem in 1908, and was the chief bookkeeper from 1923 to 1942.

She was a member of Trondhjem city council from 1919 to 1925. She was elected as a deputy representative to the Parliament of Norway from the Market towns of Sør-Trøndelag and Nord-Trøndelag counties in 1924, and served through one term, meeting in parliamentary sessions in 1925 and 1927.

She died in October 1966 and was buried at Lade.
