= Våttahaugen =

Hill in Trøndelag, Norway

Coordinates: 63.452796°N 10.22959°E

Våttahaugen is a small hill located on the Lade peninsula in Trondheim Municipality in Trøndelag county, Norway. It is the highest point at Ladehammeren. The hill offers a scenic view of the surrounding area as well as other areas of the city of Trondheim and especially the coastal area along the Trondheimsfjord. There is a playground on Våttahaugen and the area is surrounded by a small forest which leads to the area of Grønnlia.

During the World War II, Våttahaugen was a strategic location during the Nazi occupation of Norway. Våttahaugen was the site of a military installation and used as a site to control coastal traffic. Våttahaugen still has a lot of former bunker sites. Several of the houses around Våttahaugen were bombed during the war.
