= Lade School =

Location
- Trondheim, Trondelag; Norway; 63°26′50″N 10°26′11″E

Information
- Enrolment: 500
- Campus: Urban
- Website: https://www.trondheim.kommune.no/lade-skole/

Lade School (Lade Skole) is a primary school located on Ladehammerveien in Trondheim, Norway. It is located in the neighborhood of Lade, site of the historic Lade gård. The school opened in 1954. In 2004, the school celebrated its 50 years anniversary. The school has about 500 students from the age 6–16. The main building dates from 1954 with three pavilions that are approved as temporary school buildings. The school was refurbished in the 1980s. Lade School has its own music room. Lade also has a school band which performs on May 17 to celebrate Norwegian Constitution Day.
