= Østmarka Hospital =

- St. Olav's Hospital Trust

Geography
- Location: Lade, Trondheim Municipality, Norway
- Coordinates: 63.4516723°N 10.4507392°E

Organisation
- Type: Specialist
- Affiliated university: St. Olav's University Hospital

Services
- Speciality: Psychiatric hospital

History
- Opened: between 1904 and 1926

Links
- Lists: Hospitals in Norway

Østmarka Hospital (Norwegian: Østmarka sykehus) or Nidaros District Psychiatric Center (Nidaros distriktspsykriatriske senter, Nidaros DPS) is a psychiatric hospital in the Lade area of Trondheim Municipality in Trøndelag county, Norway. Nidaros DPS is supposed to replace the earlier Leistad District Psychiatric Center. It serves the boroughs of Lerkendal, Østbyen, Midtbyen of Trondheim, as well as the neighboring Malvik Municipality. Østmarka Hospital is part of St. Olav's Hospital Trust.

== History ==
On March 19, 2007, the departments Haukåsen and Østmarka joined, forming one acute department for the psychiatric health at St. Olav's University Hospital.

== Building ==
The hospital is about 4,600 square metres (50,000 sq ft), and was built for 190 million Norwegian krone. The building consists of four flats with basement. Plan 1, 2 and 3 consists all of polyclinic and daycare. Plan 2 also consists of polyclinic and Plan 3 is an activity apartment. Plan 0 consists of technical areas and wardrobes, and Plan 4 of a canteen and a kitchen.

== Location ==
Østmarka hospital is located by the trail, Ladestien which lies 60 metres (200 ft) from the hospital's border. The southside borders to a big field and the northeast continues down to the sea. There is also housing on Østmarka. The locating is planned to get a combination of private zones for the patients and zones available for the public.
