= Korsvika =

Neighborhood in the city of Trondheim, Norway

- Neighborhood in Trondheim
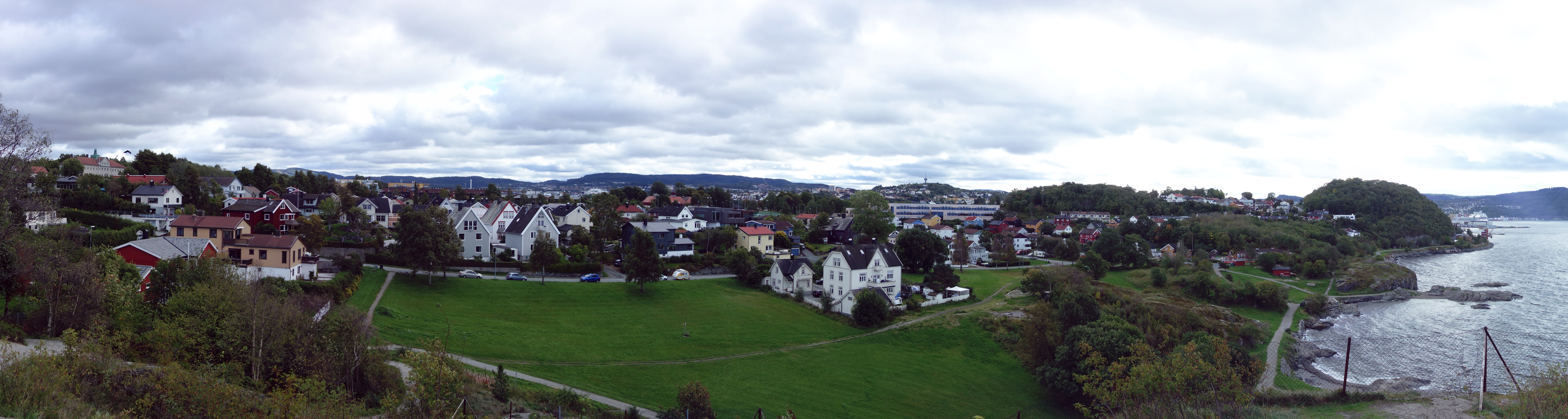
- View of the neighborhood
- Interactive map of Korsvika
- Coordinates: 63.4492°N 10.4333°E
- Country: Norway
- Region: Central Norway
- County: Trøndelag
- Municipality: Trondheim Municipality
- Borough: Østbyen
- Elevation: 18 m (59 ft)
- Time zone: UTC+01:00 (CET)
  - Summer (DST): UTC+02:00 (CEST)

Korsvika is a small residential area in the Lade area in the city of Trondheim in Trøndelag county, Norway. Korsvika is located in the Østbyen borough in Trondheim Municipality. It has several small beaches and the Ladestien trail runs through the area. Korsvika is also the site of "Korsvika barnehage", a local kindergarten.

== Korsvikaspillet ==
Korsvikaspillet is an annual festival in Korsvika. Håkon og Kark is a play which is performed bi-annually at the festival. The play was originally performed in 1989 for the 800th anniversary of the founding of Lade Church (Lade kirke). In 1995, Idar Lind wrote a new manuscript for the play with music is composed by Frode Fjellheim. The plot of the play is the life of earl Håkon Sigurdsson who was the de facto ruler of Norway during the end of the 10th century. Håkon was killed by Kark who was his slave and servant. In the play, the story is told by a skald named Einar Skåleglam.
