= Ladehammeren =

Mountain in Trøndelag, Norway

Coordinates: 63.4470°N 10.4250°E

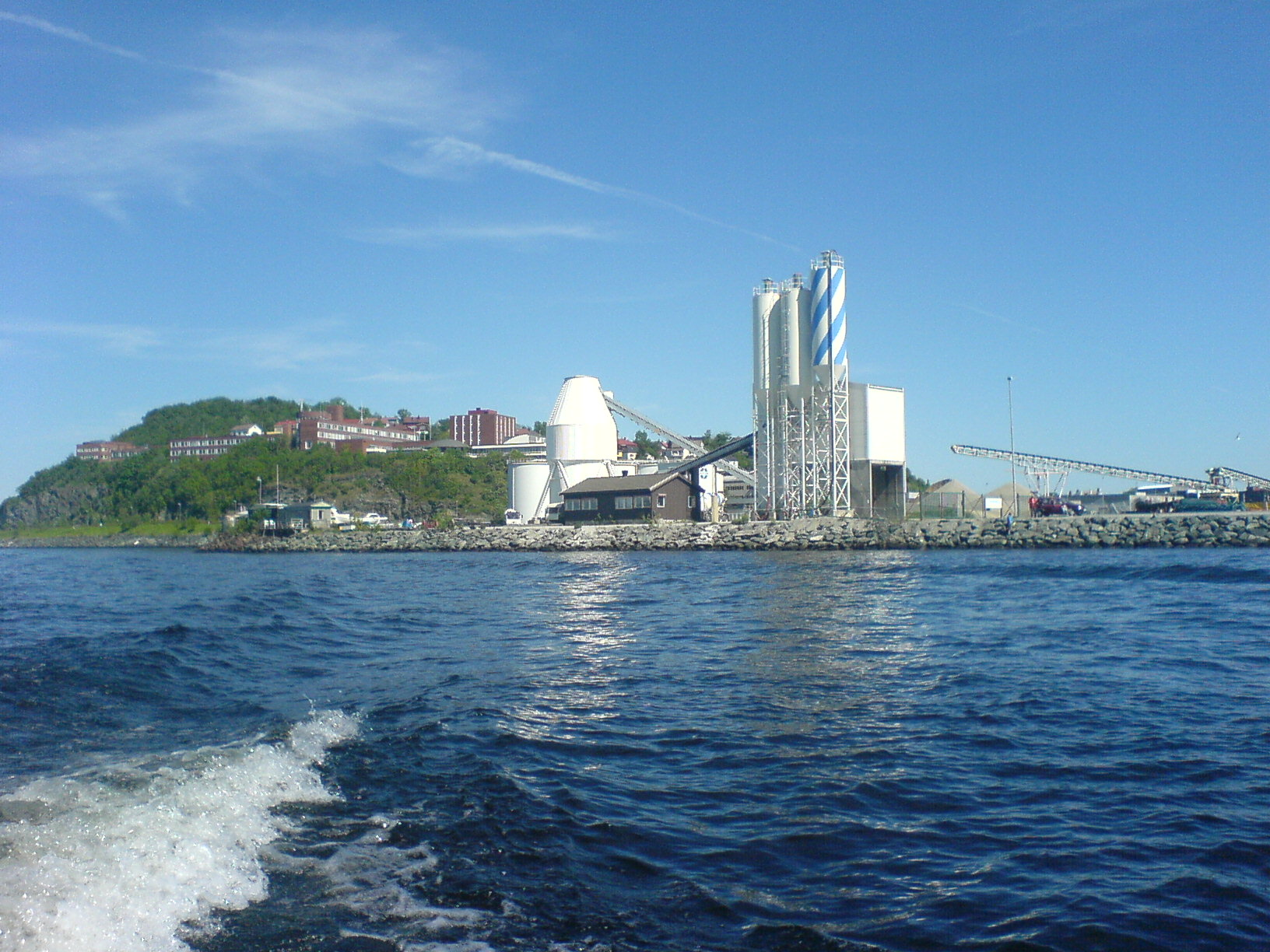
View of Ladehammeren from the harbor

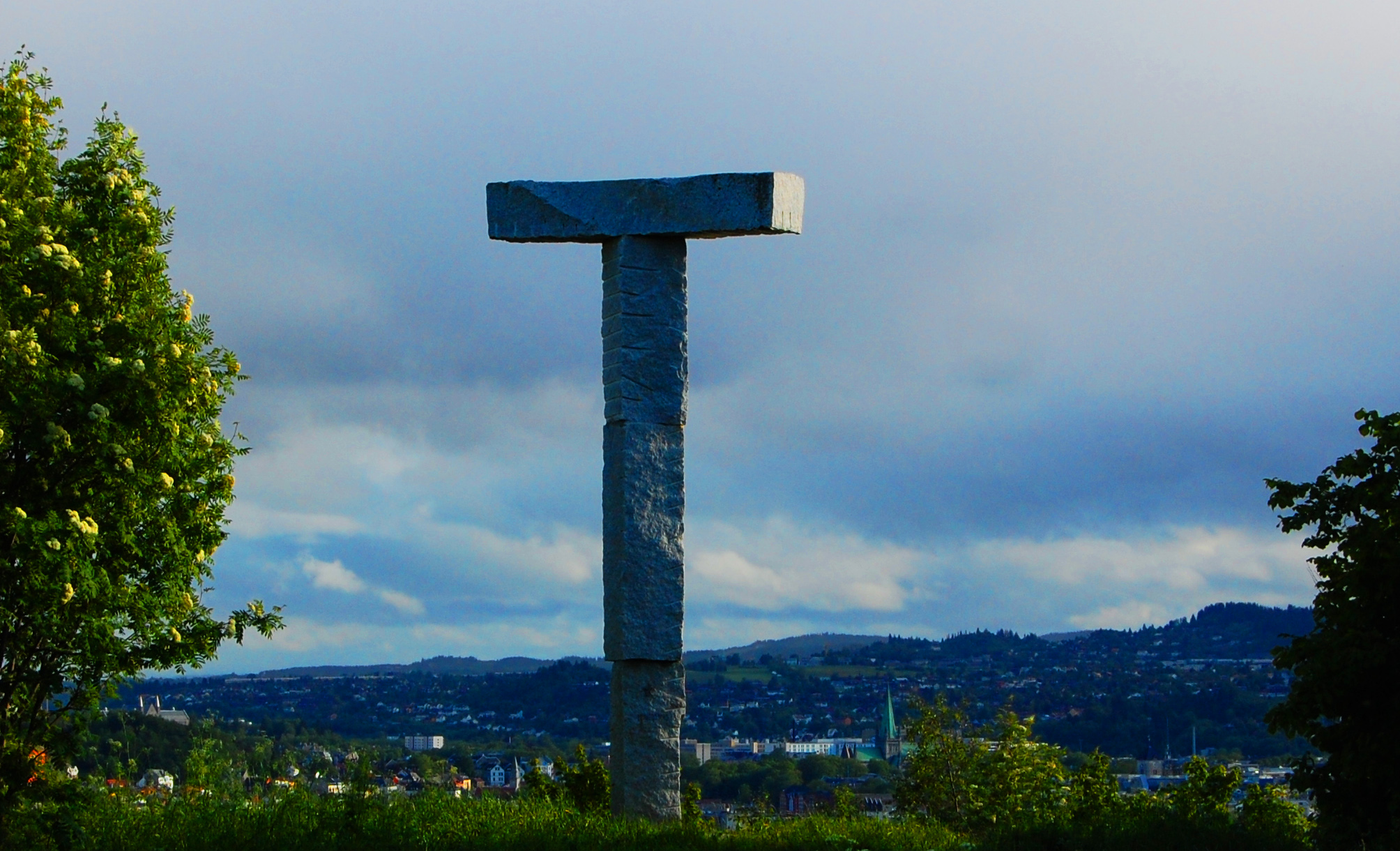
Equilibrio North at Våttahaugen

Ladehammeren or Ladehammaren is a small mountain on the Lade peninsula in the city of Trondheim which is located within Trondheim Municipality in Trøndelag county, Norway. It is located just south of the Korsvika area. Våttahaugen, the highest point of Ladehammeren, is 71 metres (233 ft) above sea level. Kjerringberget is another high point on the mountain. The area of Ladehammeren was the site of a burial cairn during the Viking Age.

In the 18th century, there were plans for building a fort at Ladehammeren, but that never happened. Starting in 1848, the military used Ladehammern to store gunpowder. German forces used these buildings during the Nazi occupation of Norway, building a fortification and bunkers.

In 2000, a monument titled "Equilibrio North" was erected at Våttahaugen. The monument was the creation of German artist Rolf Schaffner (1927-2008).
