= Ellen Lie =

Norwegian lifesaver

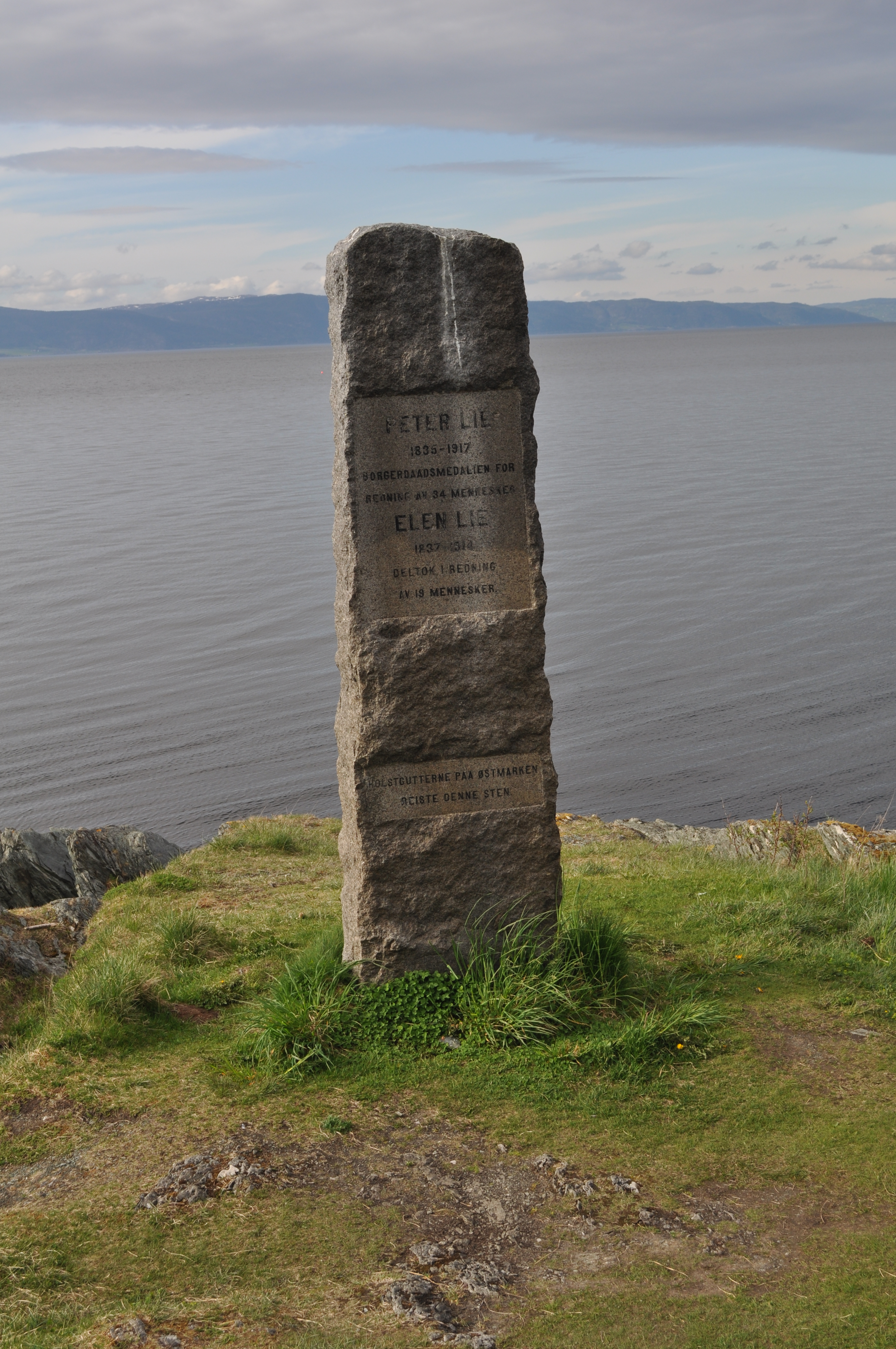
Monument in Trondheim

Ellen Johanna Lie (1833–1914) was a lifesaver from Trondheim in Norway. She saved in total 19 people and she and her husband Petter Lie were honoured for their rescuing actions.

== History ==
Ellen Johanna’s last name was Hagen before she got engaged to Petter Lie (1835–1917) in 1861. They had four daughters, and they worked at Ravnkloa selling fish. Petter Lie was a sailor from Trondheim. He is most known for rescuing people from drowning, and he has saved in total 34 people. Ellen Lie was also a lifesaver and she saved in total 19 people. In 1879 Petter Lie got the (borgerdådsmedaljen) medal of citizens in silver. They also received 200 kroner from the every year for their good actions, which was a lot of money at that time.

== The lifesavers location ==
They lived on Festberget on Østmarksnesset, also called Ararats Berg (Østmarka) at Lade, which is an area in the Norwegian city Trondheim. Ellen and Petter Lie lived by the shore, so when people had problems with their boats the help was near. In 1937 the politician Throne Holst raised a memory stone at Østmarka to honor Ellen and Petter Lie. Two streets at Østmarka have been named after Ellen and Petter Lie.
