= Lade Mansion =

Coordinates: 63°26′48″N 10°26′29″E

- Lade gård
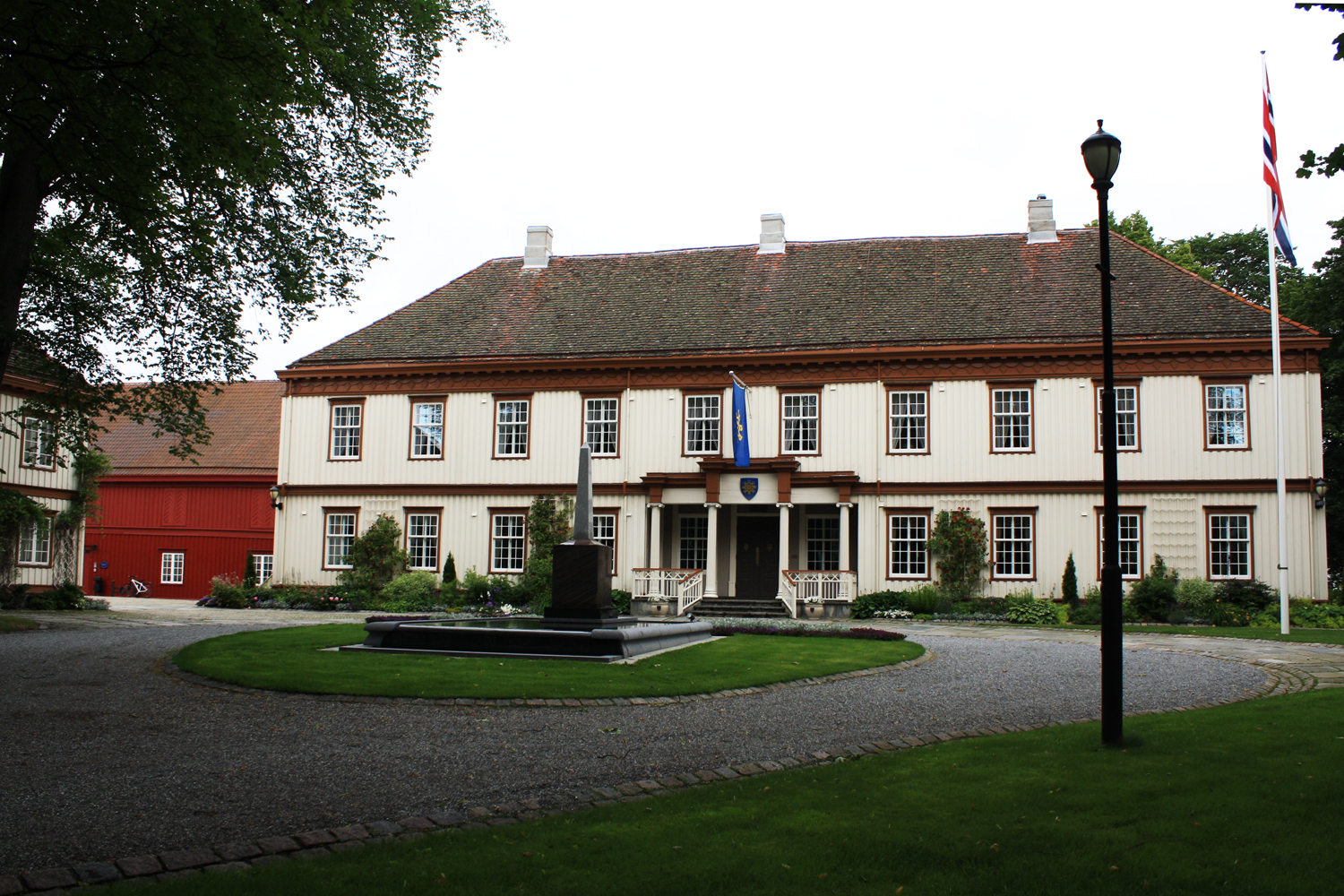
- Interactive map of the Lade Mansion area

General information
- Architectural style: Empire style
- Location: Trondheim, Norway
- Completed: Late 9th century (establishment); 1810 (current building)
- Client: Hilmar Meincke Krohg
- Owner: King of Norway; Jarls of Lade; Norwegian College of General Sciences; Reitan Group

Lade Manor (Norwegian: Lade gård or Lade Gaard) is the manor house of one of the historic farms of Norway. It is located in the community of Lade outside the city of Trondheim.

== History ==
Lade was traditionally the seat of the Earls of Lade (ladejarler), who ruled Trøndelag and Hålogaland from the 9th century to the 11th century. During the reign of King Harald Fairhair, Lade became one of the royal residences. After the introduction of Christianity in Norway, the property was subject to use by the Bakke Abbey. It became Crown land after the Protestant Reformation.

The present buildings were built in the Empire style and erected in 1810-1811 at the direction of Hilmar Meincke Krohg (1776–1851), County Governor of Romsdals Amt.

The property was purchased by the City of Trondheim in 1917. Over the years, the site housed the Norwegian College of General Sciences and the premises were used by Social Academy in Trondheim (Sosialhøgskolen, Trondheim).

In 1992, Reitan Group bought the property from the municipality. Under their direction, the buildings were restored. Reitan Group’s cultural and financial center currently occupies the site.
