= St. Olav's Hospital Trust =

Health trust in Trøndelag, Norway

St. Olavs Hospital Trust (Norwegian: St. Olavs Hospital, Universitetssykehuset i Trondheim) is a health trust which covers the southern part of Trøndelag county in Norway. The trust is owned by Central Norway Regional Health Authority and is headquartered in Trondheim. As of 2011 it had 9,725 employees and an annual budget of 7.3 billion Norwegian krone.

The main facility is St. Olavs University Hospital, situated at Øya in Trondheim Municipality. The trust operates two other somatic facilities, Orkdal Hospital and Hysnes Rehabilitation Centre. In addition to the psychiatric clinic at St. Olavs, the trust operates two psychiatric hospitals, Østmarka Hospital and Brøset Hospital. It also operates district psychiatric centers in Nidaros, Orkdal and Tiller.
