= Norwegian College of General Sciences =

Defunct Norwegian college

- Den allmennvitenskapelige høgskole
- Former names: Norwegian College of Teaching in Trondheim (1922–1984)
- Location: Norway

Norwegian College of General Sciences (Norwegian: Den allmennvitenskapelige høgskole) or AVH is a former Norwegian college which from 1968 to 1996 was part of the University of Trondheim (UNIT). It was created as the Norwegian College of Teaching in Trondheim (NLHT) in 1922, a name which it retained until 1984. In 1968 it became part of the new university in Trondheim, but in practice it retained much of its former autonomy.
