= Olaf Berg Kindt =

Norwegian physician (1850–1935)

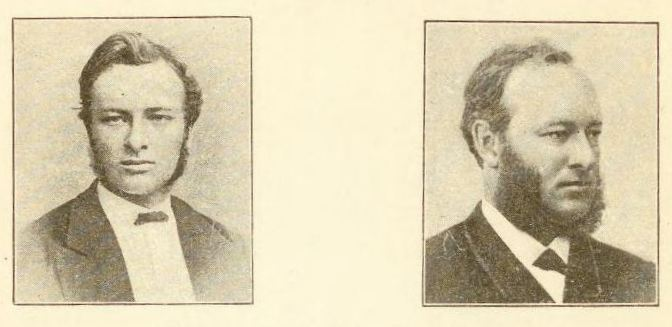
Olaf Berg Kindt.

Olaf Berg Kindt (19 August 1850 – 3 September 1935) was a Norwegian physician.

He was born in Trondhjem as a son of chief physician Christian Sommer Kindt (1816–1903) and Johanne Sofie Berg (1826–1907). In 1878 he married Henriette Augusta Trampe (1854–1929), daughter of a lieutenant colonel.

He finished his secondary education in 1869 and graduated from the Royal Frederick University with the cand.med. degree in 1877. He settled in Trondhjem as a physician in 1885, serving as city physician from 1890 to 1919. He also worked for Trøndernes Arbeidersamfund until 1925, and Ths. Angells stiftelser from 1899.

He was a board member of the Norwegian Medical Association, and from 1924 an honorary member of Trondhjem Medical Association. He was also a fellow of the Royal Norwegian Society of Sciences and Letters. He was also a member of Trondhjems Theater Interessentskab. He died in September 1935 and was buried at Lade.
