= Lade Church =

Church in Trøndelag, Norway

- Lade kirke
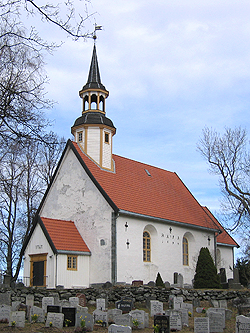
- View of the church
- Lade Church
- 63.446200146°N 10.4385933547°E
- Location: Trondheim Municipality, Trøndelag
- Country: Norway
- Denomination: Church of Norway
- Previous denomination: Catholic Church
- Churchmanship: Evangelical Lutheran

History
- Status: Parish church
- Founded: c. 1140
- Consecrated: c. 1160

Architecture
- Functional status: Active
- Architectural type: Long church
- Completed: c. 1160 (866 years ago)

Specifications
- Capacity: 160
- Materials: Stone

Administration
- Diocese: Nidaros bispedømme
- Deanery: Nidaros domprosti
- Parish: Lade
- Norwegian Cultural Heritage Site
- Type: Church
- Status: Automatically protected
- ID: 84881

Lade Church (Norwegian: Lade Kirke) is one of Norway's oldest existing stone churches. It is a parish church of the Church of Norway in Trondheim Municipality in Trøndelag county, Norway. It is located in the Lade neighborhood in the city of Trondheim, just southeast of Korsvika and east of Ladehammeren. It is the church for the Lade parish which is part of the Nidaros domprosti (arch-deanery) in the Diocese of Nidaros. The white, plastered stone church was built in a long church style around the year 1160. The church seats about 160 people.

== History ==
The earliest existing historical records of the church date back to the year 1293, but the church was built before that time. The first church was likely a wooden stave church that was built in the 10th century. Soon after the church was replaced with a small stone church. The present church was likely built in the 12th century, making it one of Norway's oldest existing stone churches. Nobody knows exactly when it was built, but the initial construction probably began during the 1130s and it was completed around 1160. The building was designed in a Romanesque style. The nave measures about 16.5 by 10.7 metres (54 ft × 35 ft) and the choir is 7.1 by 7.4 metres (23 ft × 24 ft). The church was located on the Lade estate which was a Crown Estate starting under Harald Hårfagre.

During the 17th century, the nave was almost completely rebuilt, possibly finishing in 1694 since that number is carved into one of the nave walls. During the wars with Sweden (and again later during World War II), the church was used as a food stock. The altarpiece dates back to 1709 when it was received as a gift from Ellen Rovert from the nearby Lade Gård estate. There is actually a swastika inscribed in a stone in the wall near the altar. In 1767, a wooden entry porch was added on the west end of the building. In 1800, a new tower was built atop the church roof.

In 1814, this church served as an election church (Norwegian: valgkirke). Together with more than 300 other parish churches across Norway, it was a polling station for elections to the 1814 Norwegian Constituent Assembly which wrote the Constitution of Norway. This was Norway's first national elections. Each church parish was a constituency that elected people called "electors" who later met together in each county to elect the representatives for the assembly that was to meet at Eidsvoll Manor later that year.

== Media gallery ==
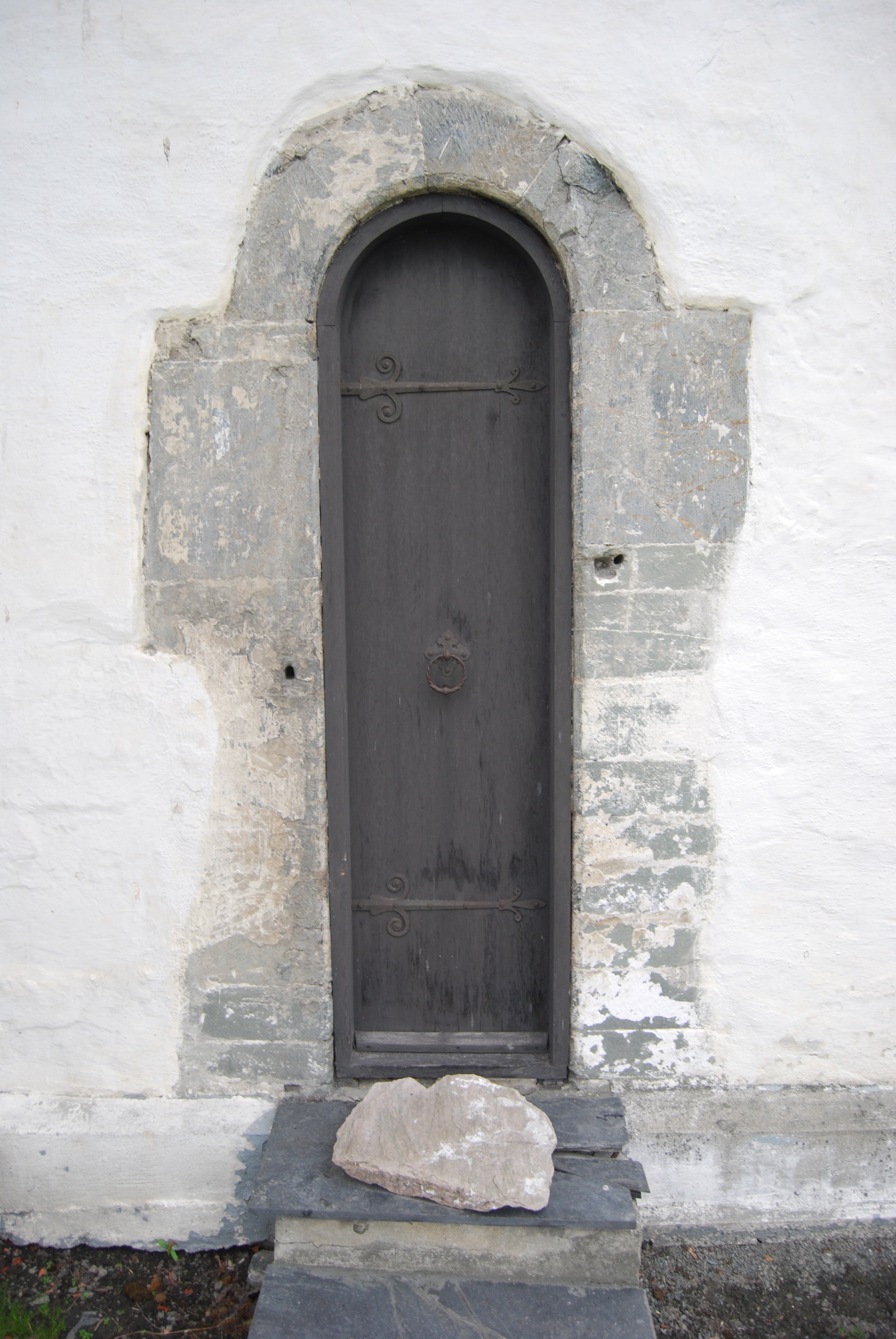
Door to the church

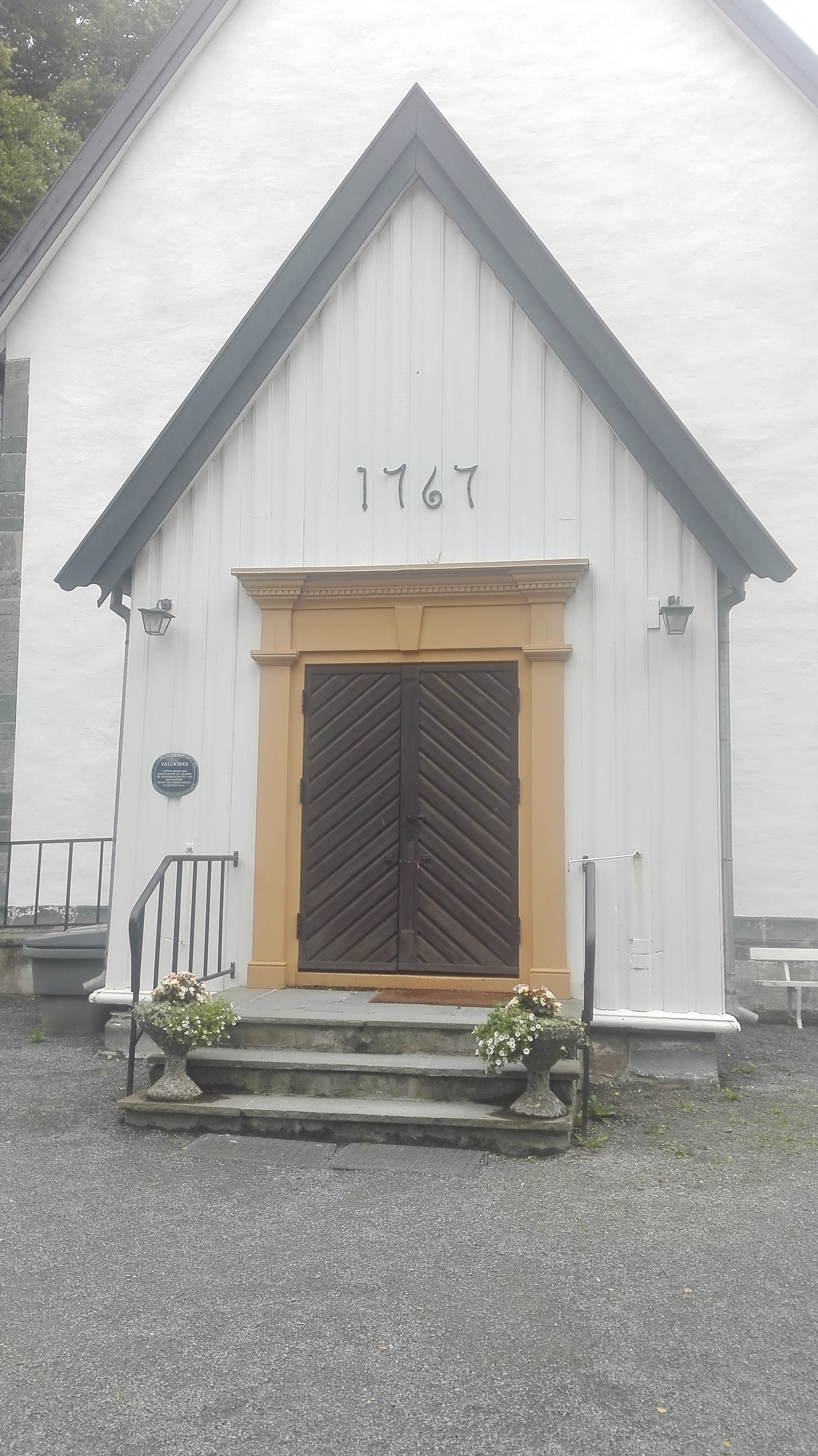
Entrance to the church

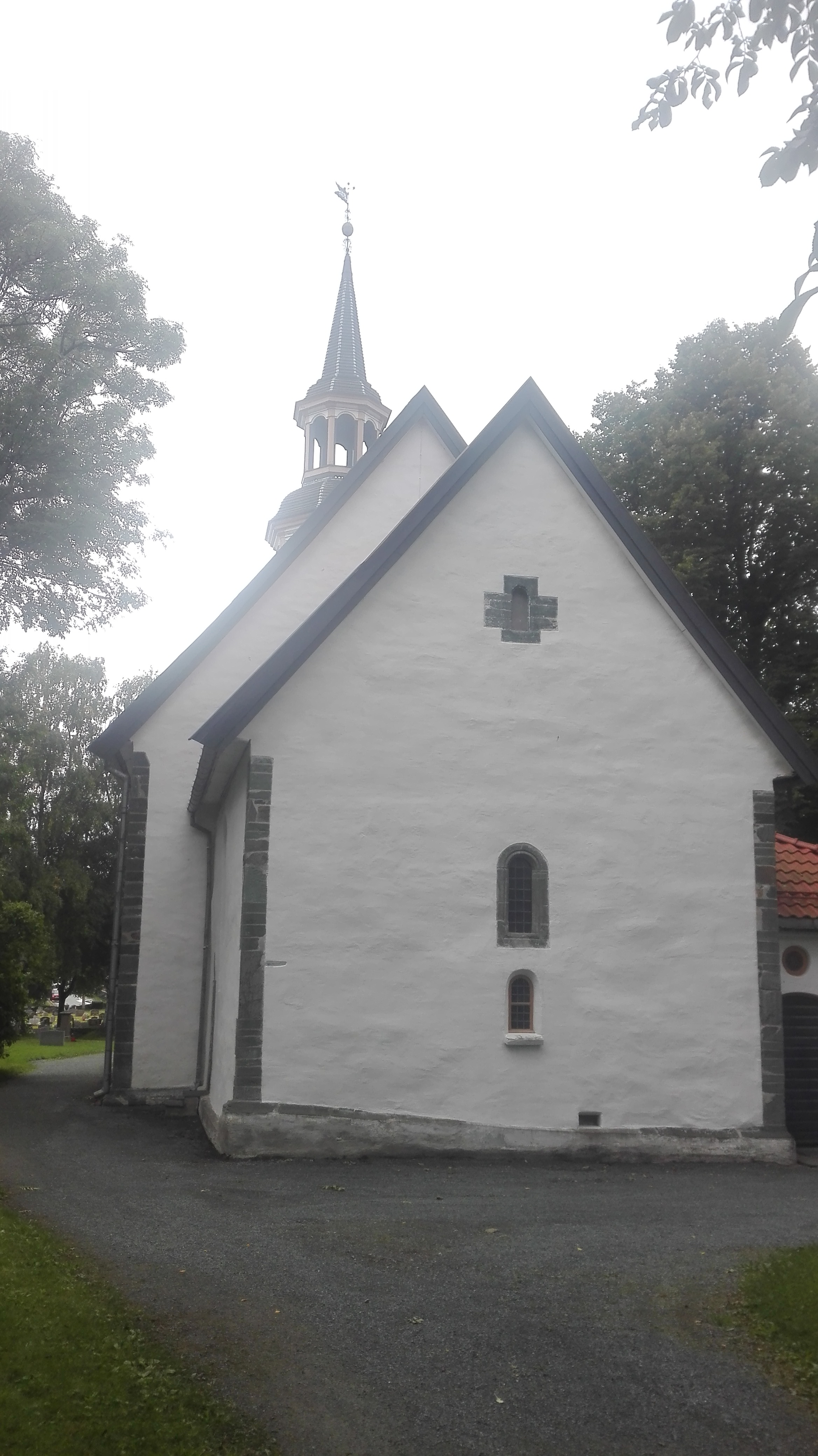
Back of the church

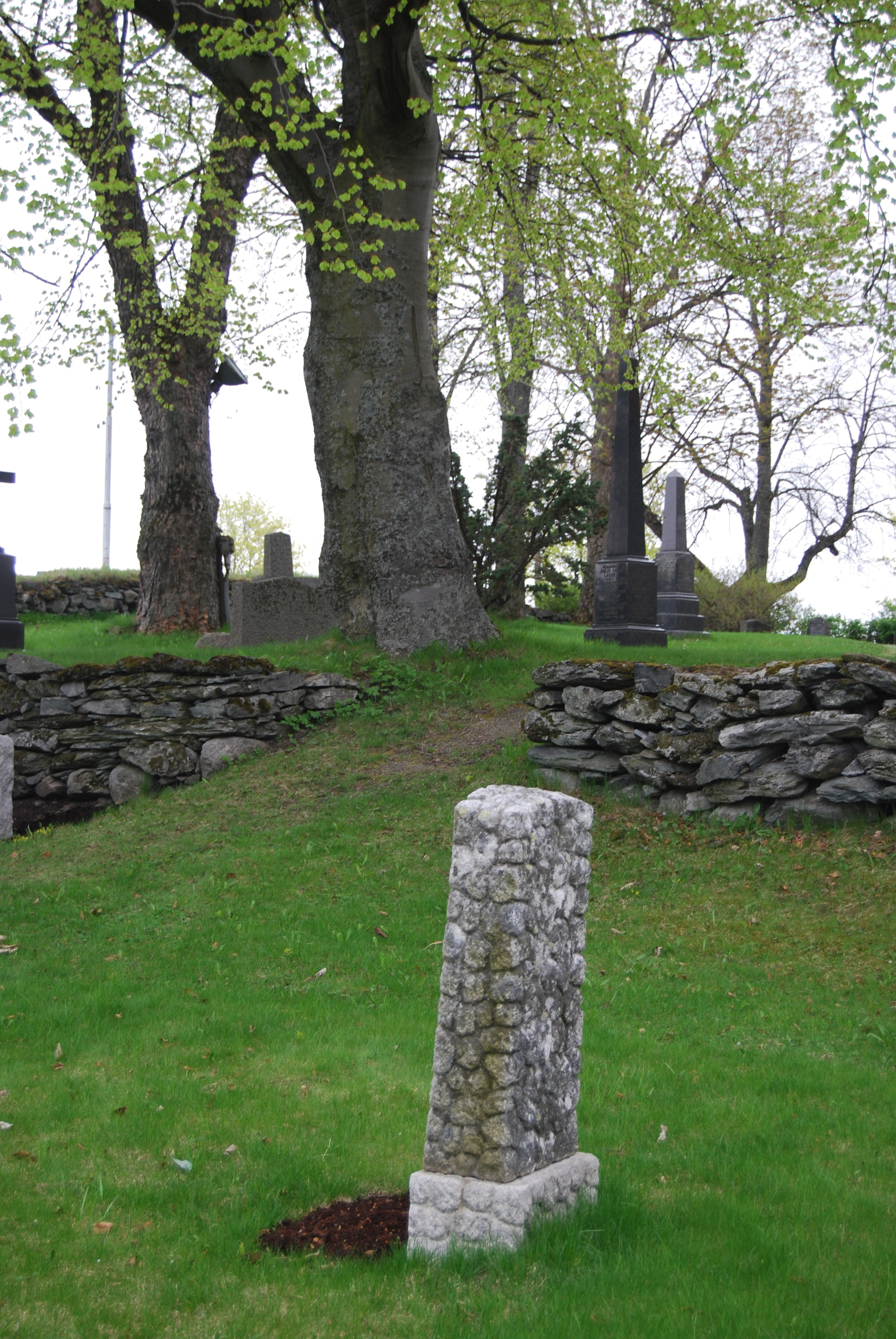
Churchyard

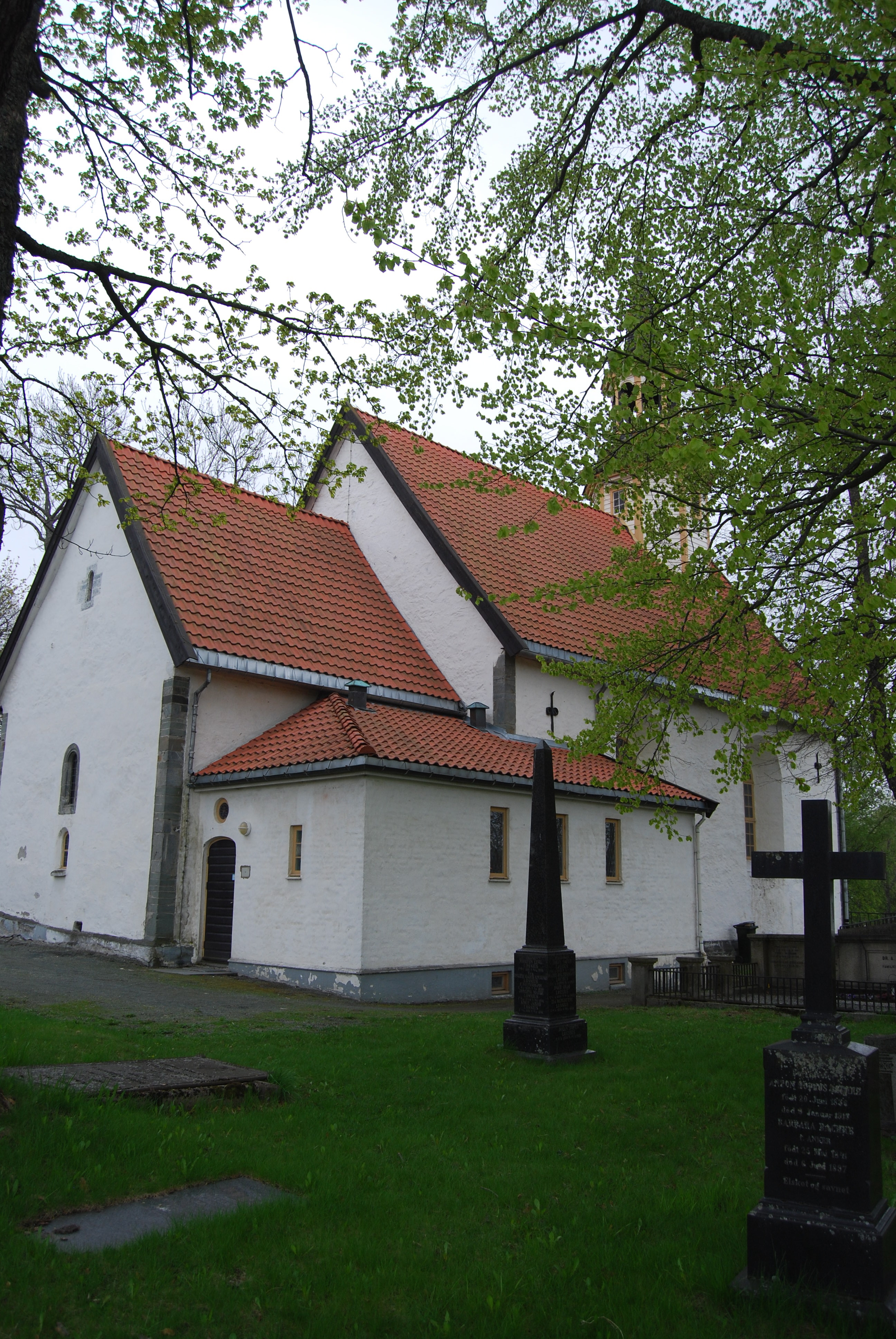
View of the back

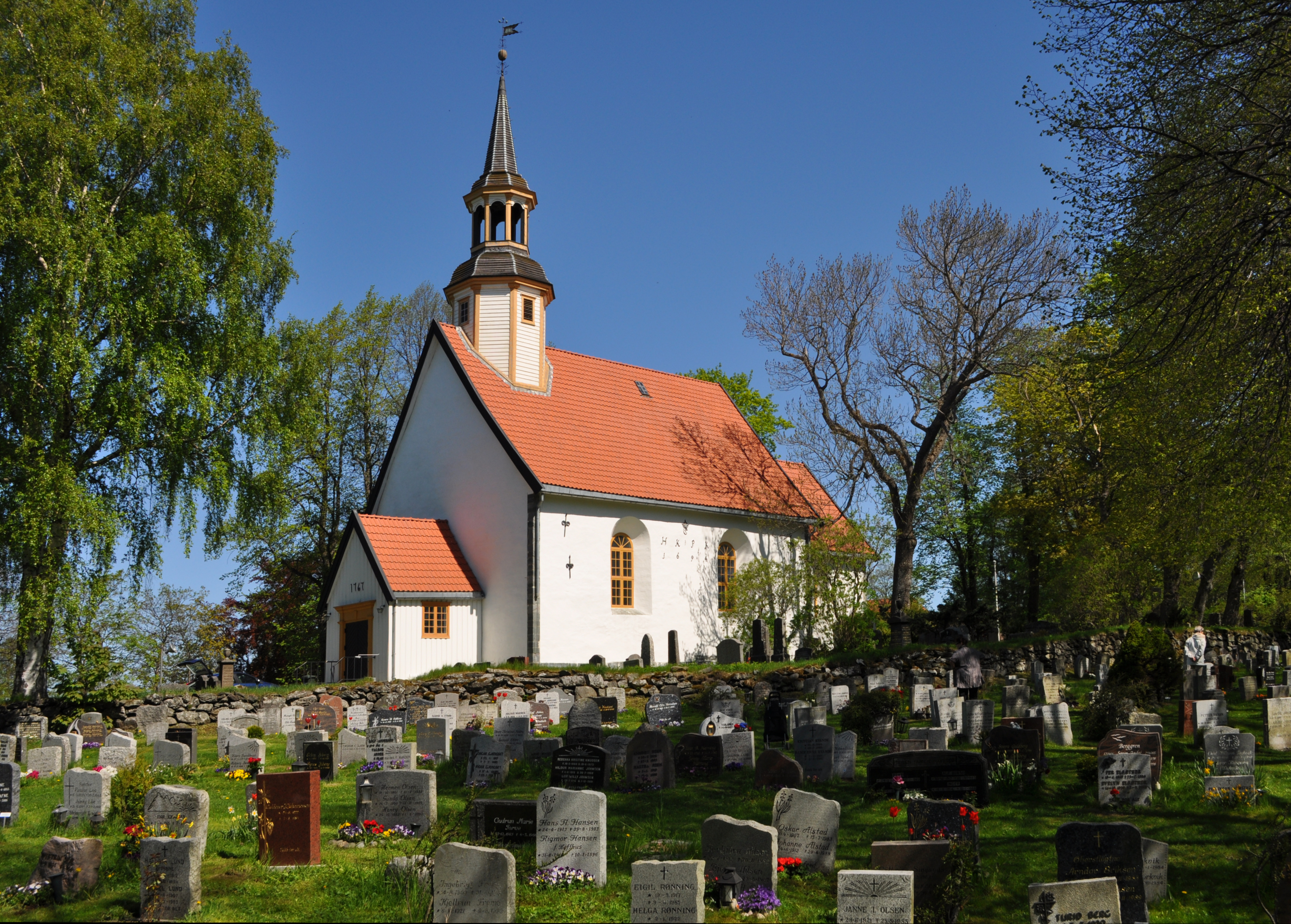
Cemetery

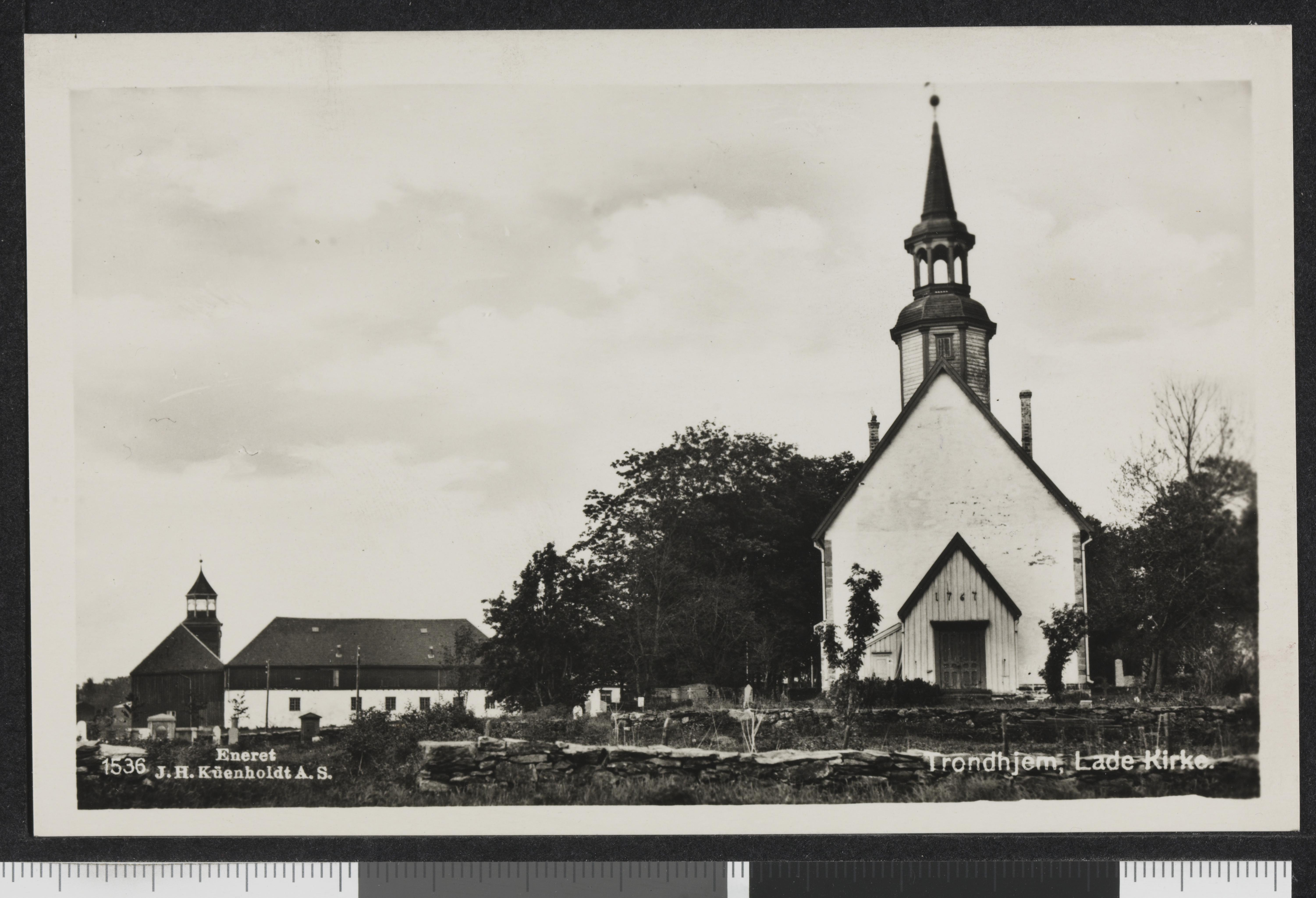
Exterior view (c. 1925)

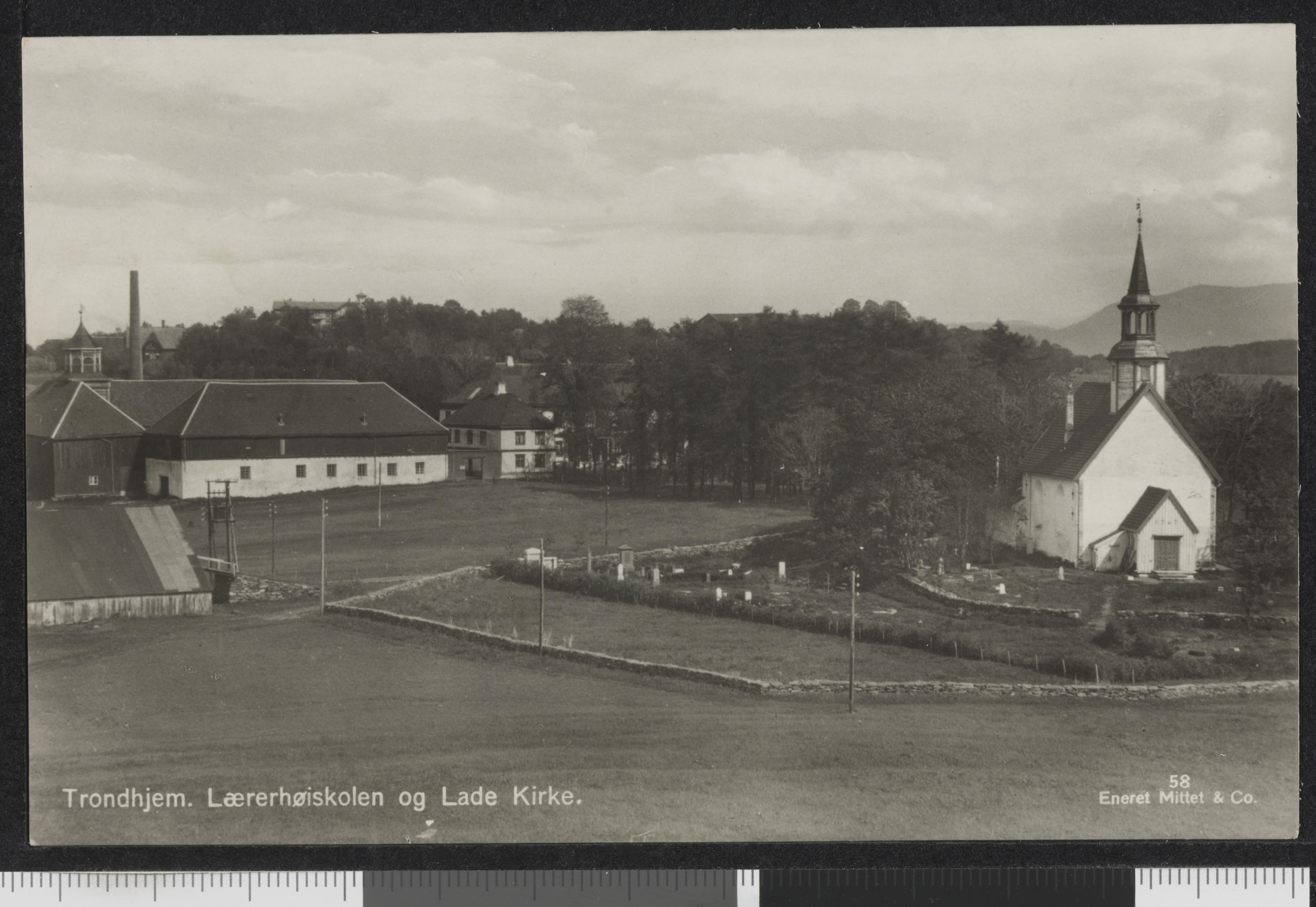
Exterior view (c. 1925)

== See also ==
- List of churches in Nidaros
