= Christian Sommer Kindt =

Christian Sommer Kindt (8 November 1815 – 1 March 1903) was a Norwegian physician and botanical collector born in the town of Risør. He was the father of physician Olaf Berg Kindt (1850–1935).

He studied medicine in Christiania, later serving as a physician at the Trondheim hospital. As a pastime, he collected lichen and algae. His collection can be found at the Videnskabsselskabets Museum in Oslo.

In 1884 he described the lichen species Microglaena nidarosiensis (synonym, Belonia nidarosiensis).
