= Nobó =

Irish brand of dairy-free ice cream

nobó
- Course: Dessert
- Place of origin: Ireland
- Created by: Brian and Rachel Nolan
- Invented: 2012
- Main ingredients: Avocado, coconut milk and honey

Nobó is a brand of dairy-free ice cream, manufactured in Dublin, Ireland and sold nationally.

== Background ==
The name Nobó is an amalgamation of the word no and the Irish word bó, to mean "no cow". This refers to the lack of dairy ingredients in the ice cream.

The company was started by Brian and Rachel Nolan in 2012. In 2013, the couple took part in the Food Works programme by Bord Bia, Enterprise Ireland and Teasgasc. They introduced Nobó commercially through local farmer’s markets before making the transition to major stores at the start of 2014. By September, the product was available in 100 stores across Ireland, which led to take up by the major national retailer SuperValu and other stores. The ice cream is also sold in the United Arab Emirates.

== Products ==
The main ingredients used in Nobó ice cream include avocado, coconut milk and honey as a natural sweetener. Nobó offers Chocolate and Toasted Almond, Vanilla and Coconut, Fresh Lemon, Passion Fruit, Mango and Irish Salted Caramel, available in 500ml and 100ml tubs. Nobó ice creams are also free from lactose, soya, gluten, cholesterol and eggs, as the founders cannot eat these ingredients found in conventional ice cream.

== Reception ==
The product has been reported in national media for its taste and demonstrating a market for Irish exports. In August 2014, Nobó's Fresh Lemon flavour won 3 gold stars at the Great Taste Awards in the UK. The Irish Independent's Linda O'Sullivan wrote "Go taste their ice-cream, it is simply delicious." The Vegetarian Society of Ireland have suggested the product as a suitable dairy-free alternative to ice cream, though it contains honey, meaning it would not be considered vegan.

== See also ==
- List of ice cream brands
