= Ladestien =

Hiking trail in Trondheim, Norway

Coordinates: 63°27′24″N 10°27′0″E

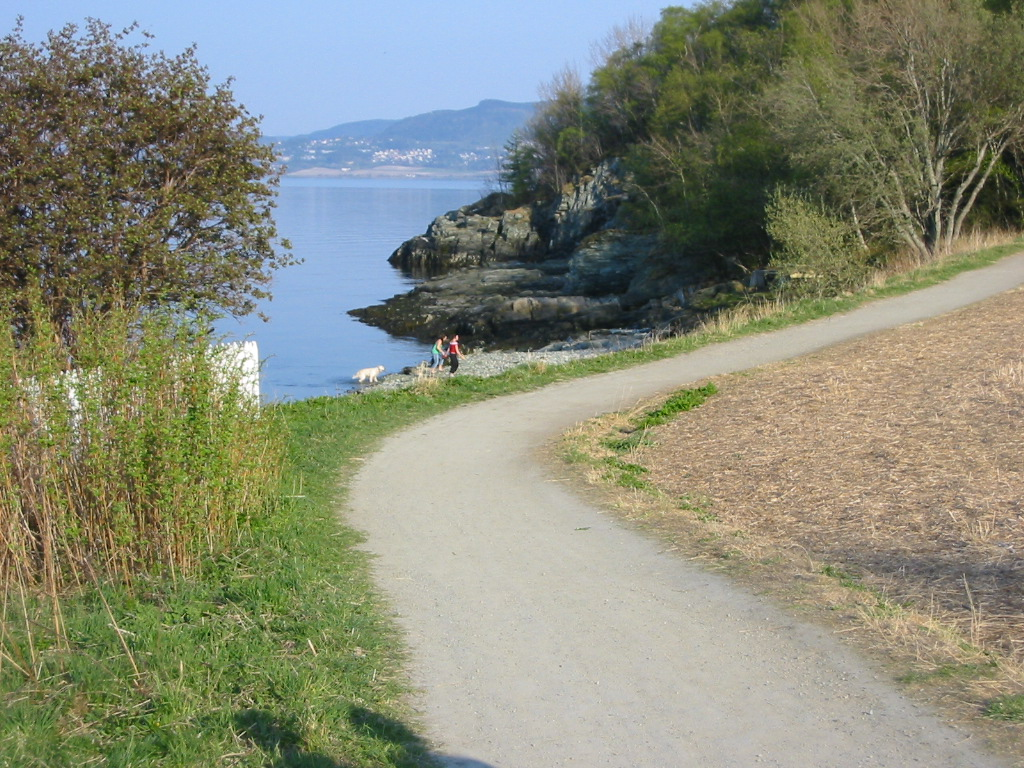
View of the path

Ladestien (English: the Lade Trail) is a broad walking track that strolls along the Trondheimsfjord around the entire Lade Peninsula in the municipality of Trondheim in Sør-Trøndelag county, Norway. The track is about 14 kilometres (8.7 mi) long. The western part of the track starts at Korsvika, about 1 kilometre (0.62 mi) east of the center of Trondheim, and follows the fjord east to Charlottenlund. The western part climbs small hilltops, often with a beautiful view of the Trondheimsfjord. The eastern part is almost flat.

There is lush vegetation along the track, with birch, pine, spruce, Rowan, alder, and hazel, the latter being very common in the western part of the track. In addition, sycamore maple, although not a part of the original flora, is rapidly spreading and is now among the most common trees. Further east, Statoils large research center at Rotvoll is easily spotted as the track continues east. Also at Rotvoll is the Leangen Manor (Norwegian: Leangen Gård), including an English-inspired garden, with small water ponds and large deciduous trees (ash, elm, maple, oak). The manor is owned by Trondheim municipality and used for representational purposes.

There are several beaches (mainly rocky or with pebbles) along Ladestien, some of the most popular are Ringvebukta (not far from Ringve Museum and botanical garden) and Djupvika; the latter includes a large lawn and volleyball net. Swimming in the fjord is indeed refreshing, although a water temperature of 18 °C (64 °F) is fairly common during warm spells, and in warm summers water temperatures might reach 21 °C (70 °F). In nice summer weather, a walk along the lush Ladestien with the calm waves from the fjord rolling gently against rocks and beaches might give associations to places much further south.

== Media gallery ==
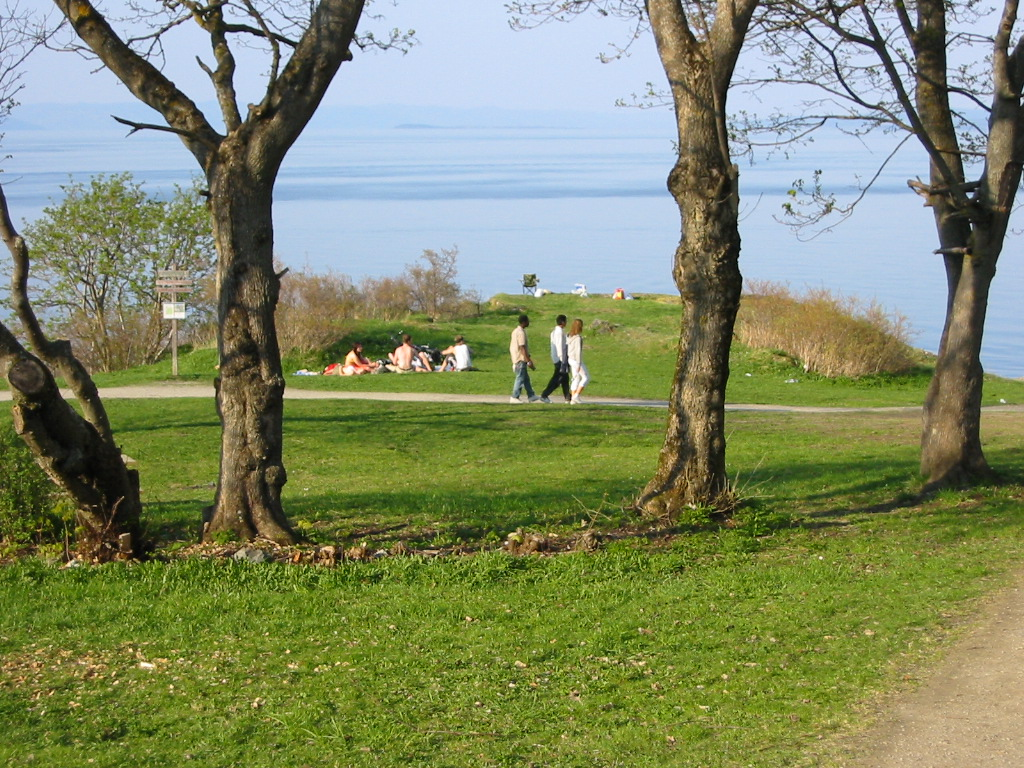
Djupvika

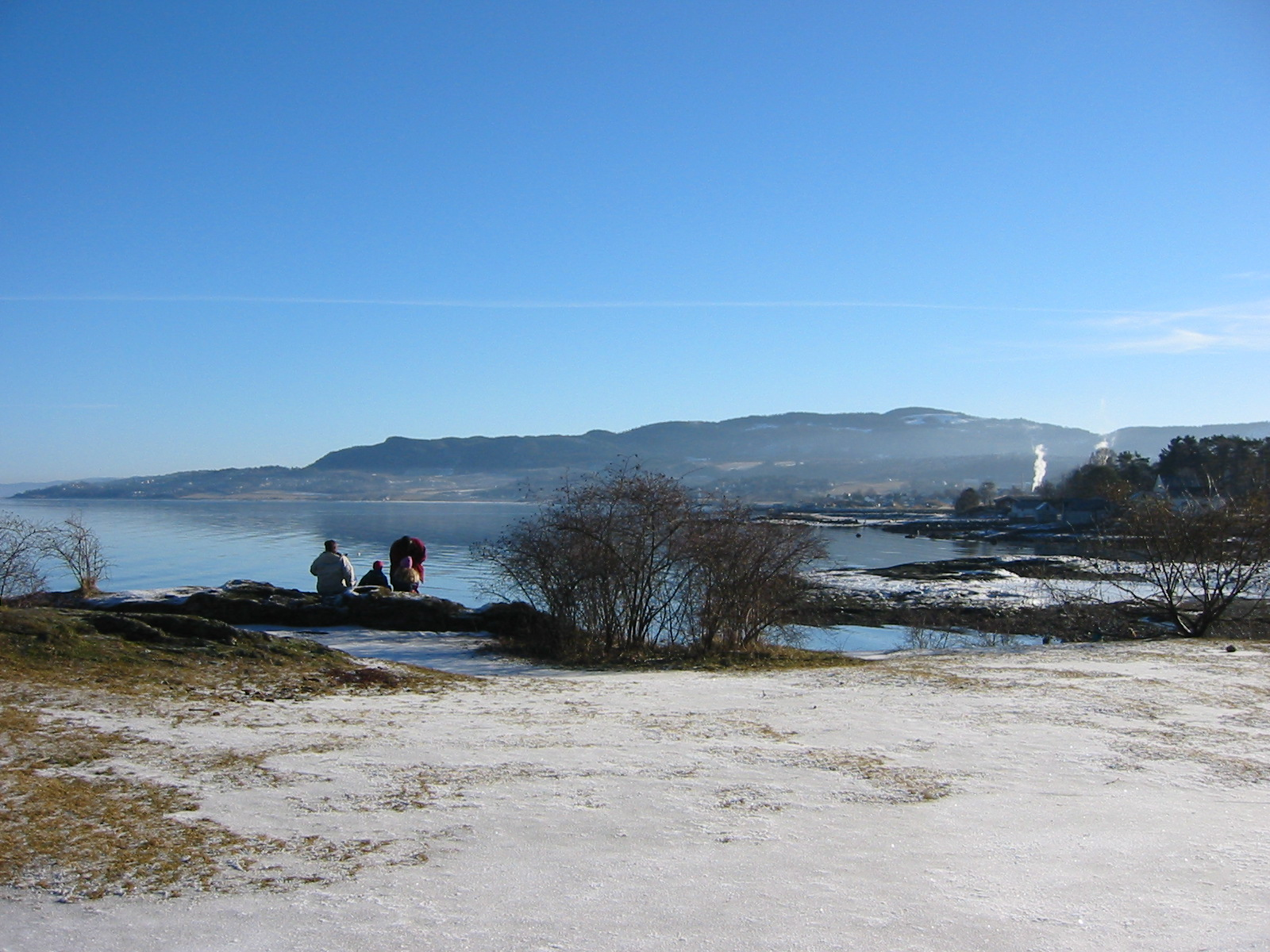
Eastern part of Ladestien in winter, Feb 23 2003

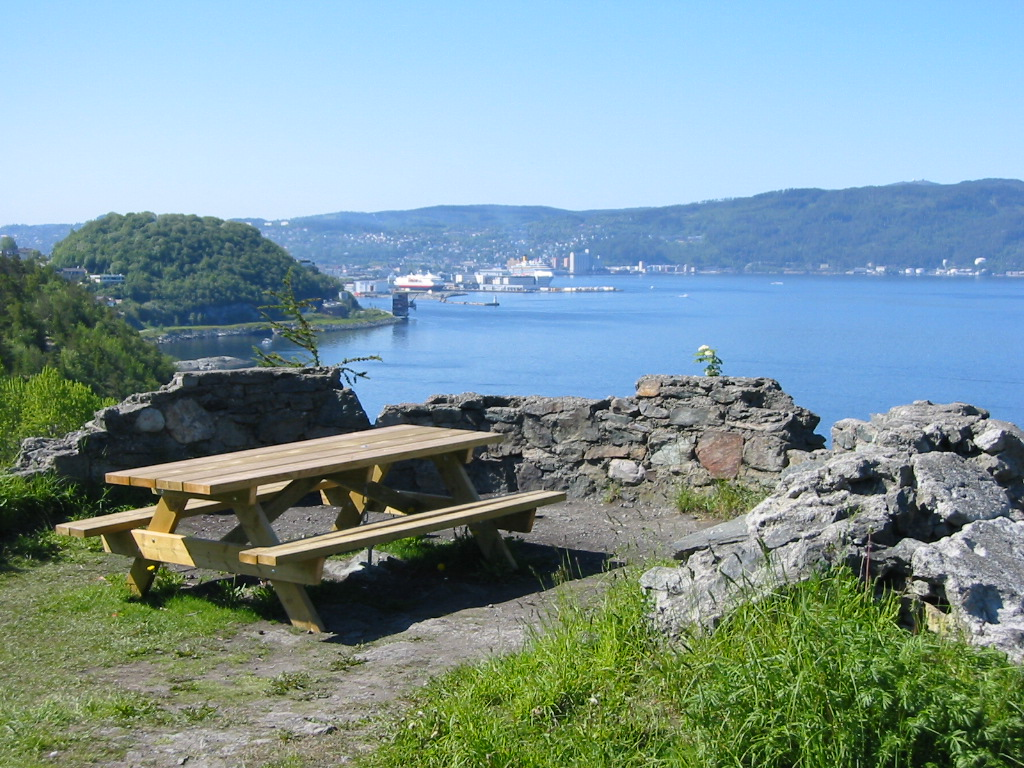
View from hilltop

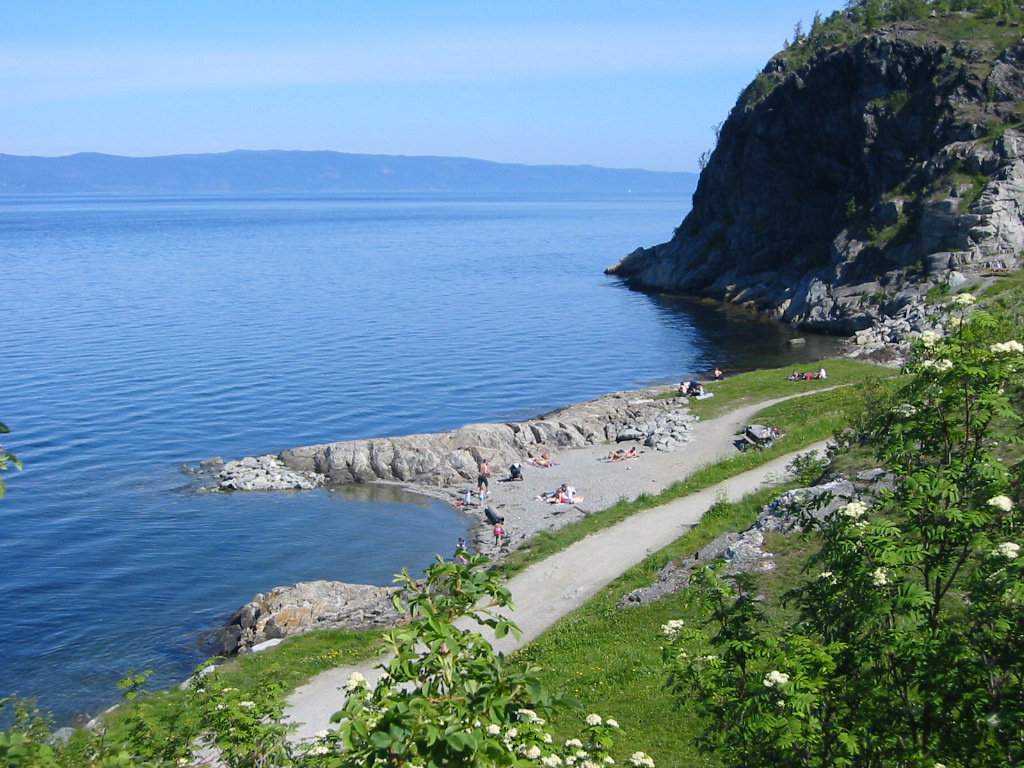
Korsvika, western part of Ladestien

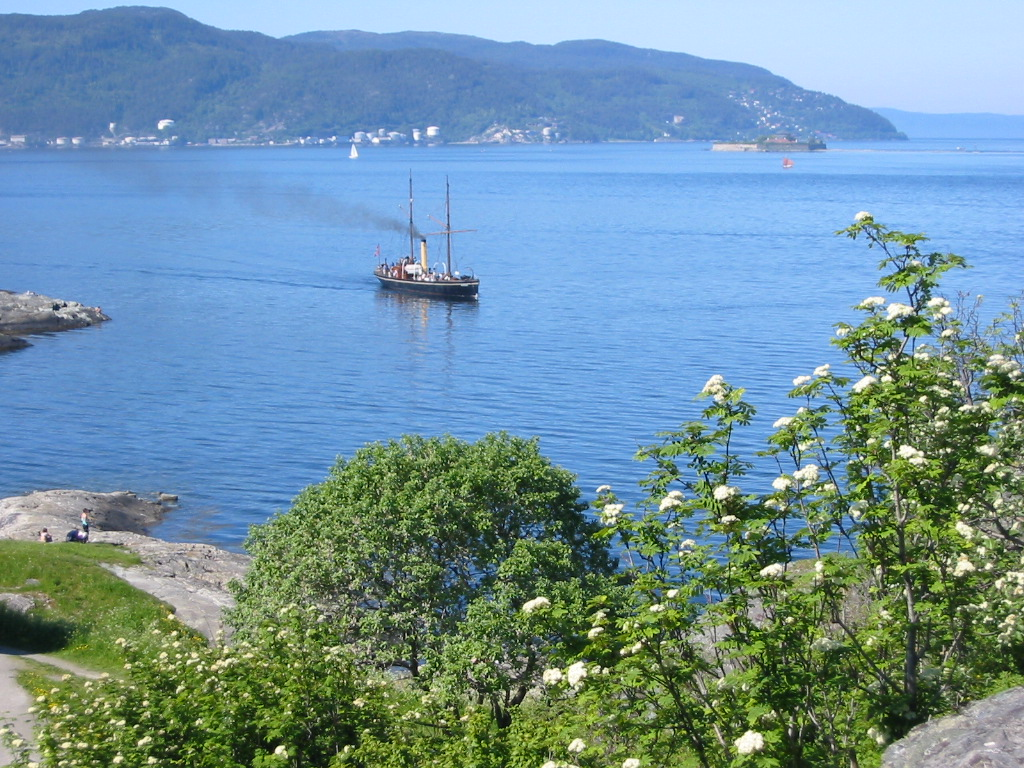
Korsvika, view from hill
