= Nobø =

Norwegian manufacturing company

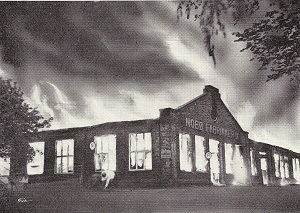
From the fire at NOBØ Factories in Trondheim in 1949

Nobø is a manufacturing company in Norway. It started as NOrsk BØttefabrikk (transl. the Norwegian Bucket Factory) in Lade in Trondheim in 1918 - the name Nobø is a contraction of the original title. The factory originally produced only buckets, but later made several sheet iron products as well. It now manufactures desks, electric wall heaters and filing cabinets. The company developed and a new factory was built in Stjørdal Municipality. Nobø then produced electric heating accessories only, which it is still doing today.

In the 1990s the original Nobø factory was closed down and the area is now a housing estate of about 220 houses and flats, called Ingemann Torps Street or Nobø-tomta (Nobø-field). The area was planned by Heimdal Utbyggingsselskap and Pir II Architects.
