= Trondheim Fjord =

Body of water in Norway

Trondheimsfjorden
- Trondheim Fjord
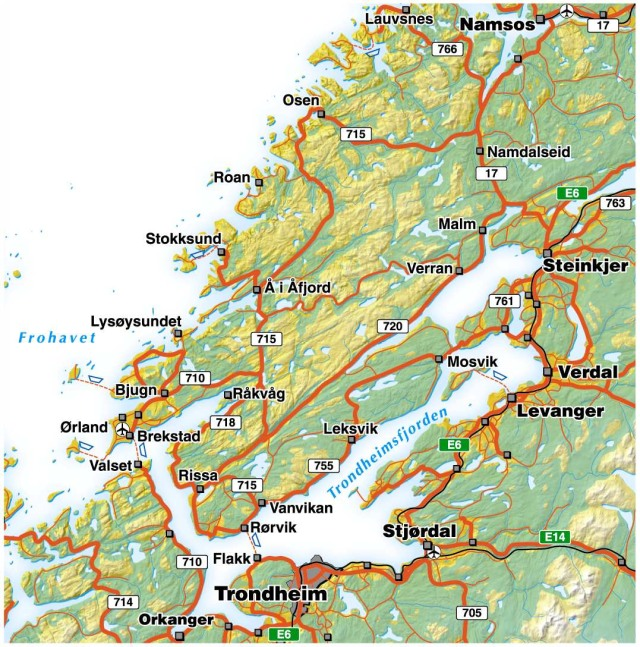
- Map of Trondheim Fjord and the Fosen peninsula

- Location of the fjord Trondheimsfjorden (Norway)
- Location: Trøndelag county, Norway
- Coordinates: 63.8192°N 11.1078°E
- Type: Fjord
- Basin countries: Norway
- Max. length: 130 kilometres (81 mi)
- Max. depth: 617 metres (2,024 ft)
- Settlements: Trondheim, Stjørdalshalsen, Levanger, Steinkjer

The Trondheim Fjord or Trondheimsfjorden (pronounced [ˈtrɔ̂nː(h)æɪmsˌfjuːɳ]), an inlet of the Norwegian Sea, is Norway's third-longest fjord at 130 kilometres (81 mi) long. It is located in the west-central part of the country in Trøndelag county, and it stretches from Ørland Municipality in the west to Steinkjer Municipality in the north, passing the city of Trondheim on its way. Its maximum depth is 617 metres (2,024 ft), in the channel between Orkland Municipality and Indre Fosen Municipality.

The largest islands in the fjord are Ytterøya and Tautra; the small island of Munkholmen is located near the harbor of Trondheim; and there are several islands at the entrance of the fjord. The narrow Skarnsundet is crossed by the Skarnsund Bridge. The part of the fjord to the north of the strait is referred to as the Beitstadfjorden. The main part of the Trondheimsfjord is ice-free all year; only Verrasundet, a long and narrow fjord branch in the northern part of the fjord, might be ice covered in winter. The Beitstadfjorden might also freeze over in winter, but only for a few weeks.

The towns of Stjørdalshalsen, Levanger, and Steinkjer are found on the eastern and northeastern shores of the fjord. Aker Verdal in Verdal Municipality produces large offshore installations for the petroleum sector. A yard in Indre Fosen Municipality completed the luxurious apartment ship MS The World. Fiborgtangen is a peninsula along the eastern shore of the fjord where a large paper mill owned by Norske Skog is located.

The Trondheimsfjord has rich marine life, with both southern and northern species; at least 90 species of fish have been observed, and the fjord has the largest biological production among Norway's fjords. In recent years, deep water corals (Lophelia pertusa) were discovered in the fjord, not far from the city of Trondheim. Several of the best salmon rivers in Norway empty into the fjord. Among these are the rivers Gaula (on the border of Melhus Municipality and Trondheim Municipality), Orklaelva (in Orkland Municipality), Stjørdalselva (in Stjørdal Municipality), and Verdalselva (in Verdal Municipality).

The lowland east and south of the fjord represents one of Norway's best agricultural areas. The more rugged and mountainous Fosen peninsula lies to the west and northwest, giving some shelter from the wind common to coastal areas.

The Trondheimsfjord was an important waterway in the Viking Age, as it is still today. In 1888, an undersea mudslide caused a tsunami that killed one person in Trondheim and ruptured three railway lines.

Four giant squid have been found in the fjord, which is among the highest concentrations in the world.

== Name ==
The fjord is named after the city of Trondheim, but originally the name of the fjord might have been just *Þrónd or *Þróund in Old Norse. A name like that would be related to the verb þróast, which means to 'thrive' or 'flourish' and the name Þrór, which means 'likeable' or 'stoutish' (and was one of Odin's nicknames).

If this is the case, then the people living around the fjord (the þrœndir; see Trøndelag) named themselves after the fjord. (Compare sygnir, which means 'the people living around the fjord Sogn'.)

== Media gallery ==
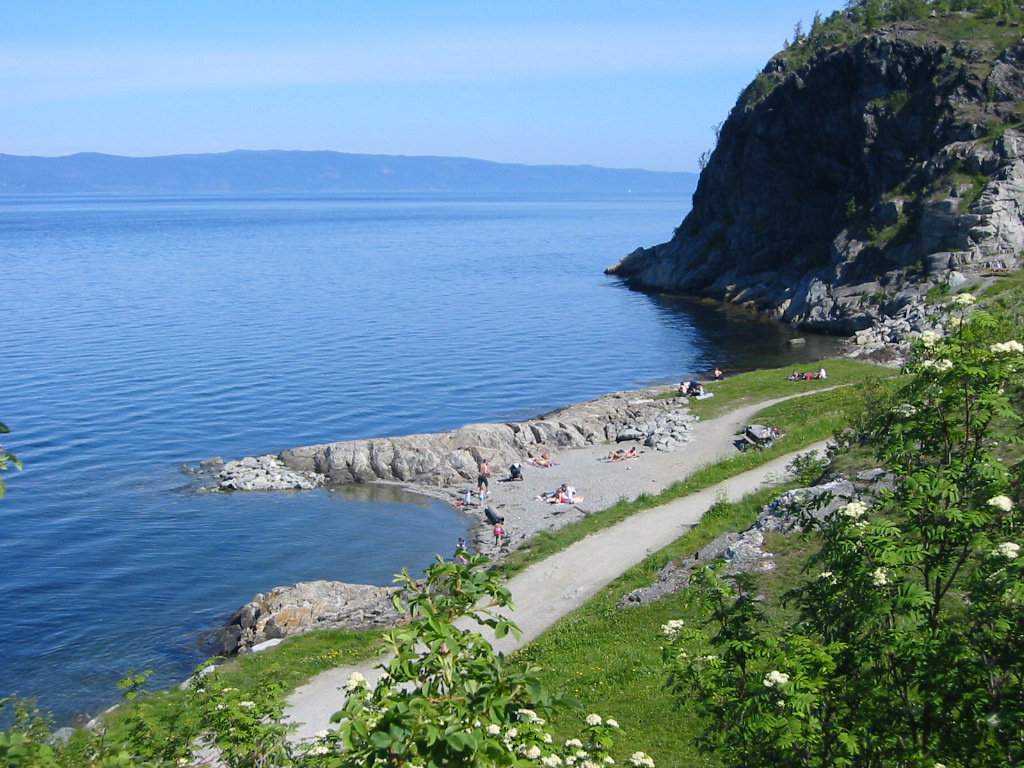
Korsvika, eastern Trondheim, view towards north

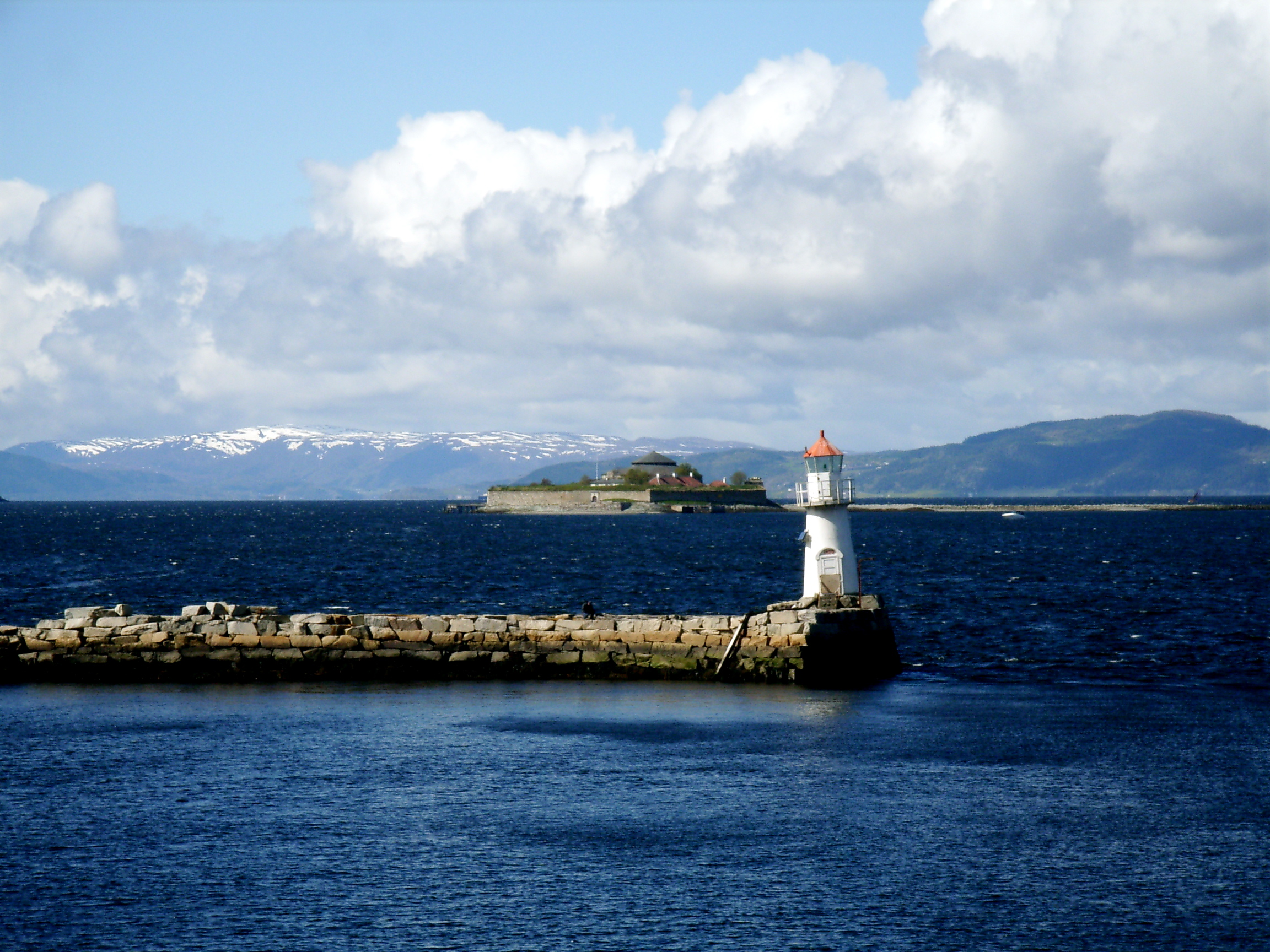
Lighthouse and the island Munkholmen

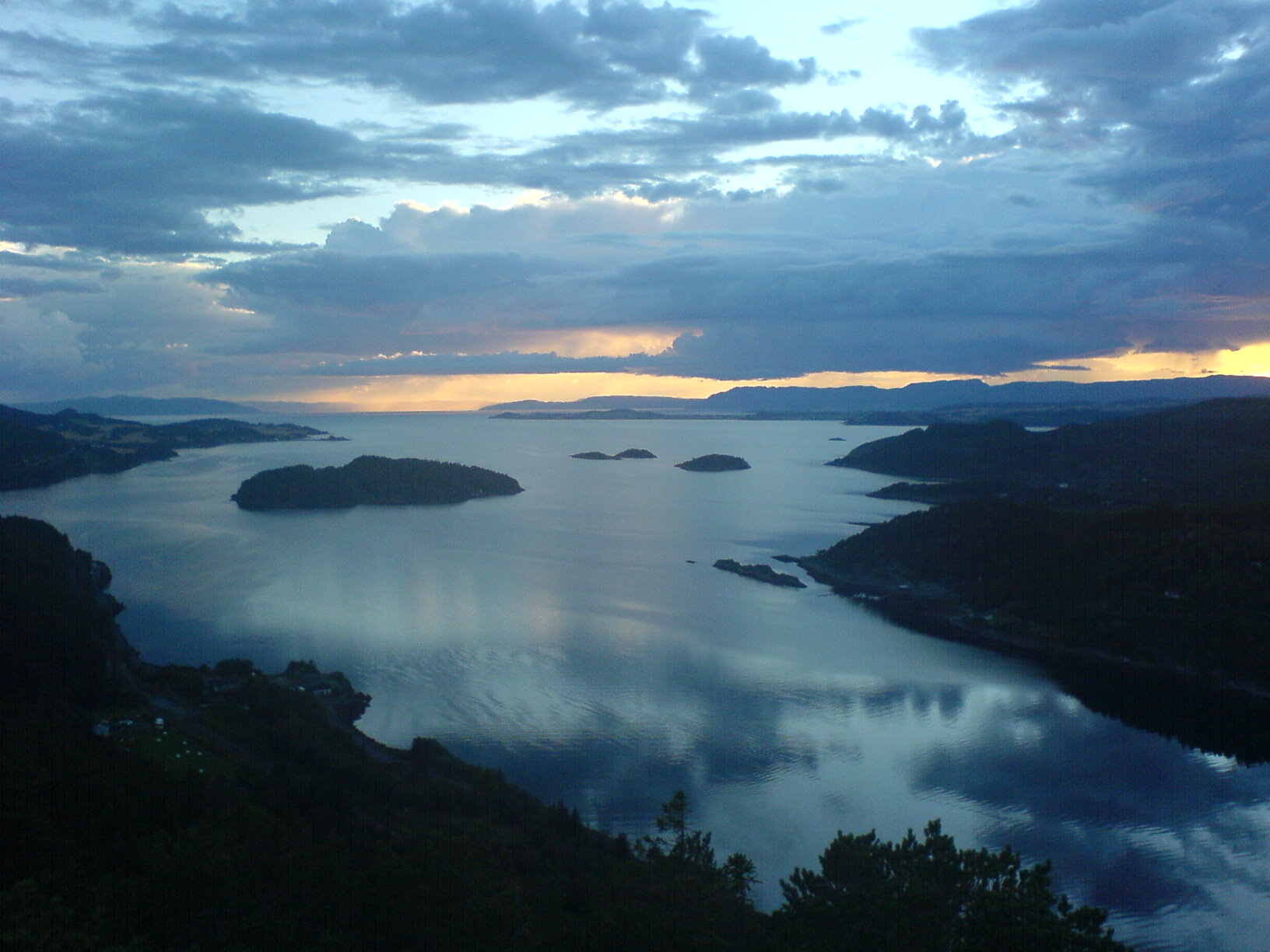
Åsenfjord, near Stjørdal. The Tirpitz was moored nearby during parts of World War II.

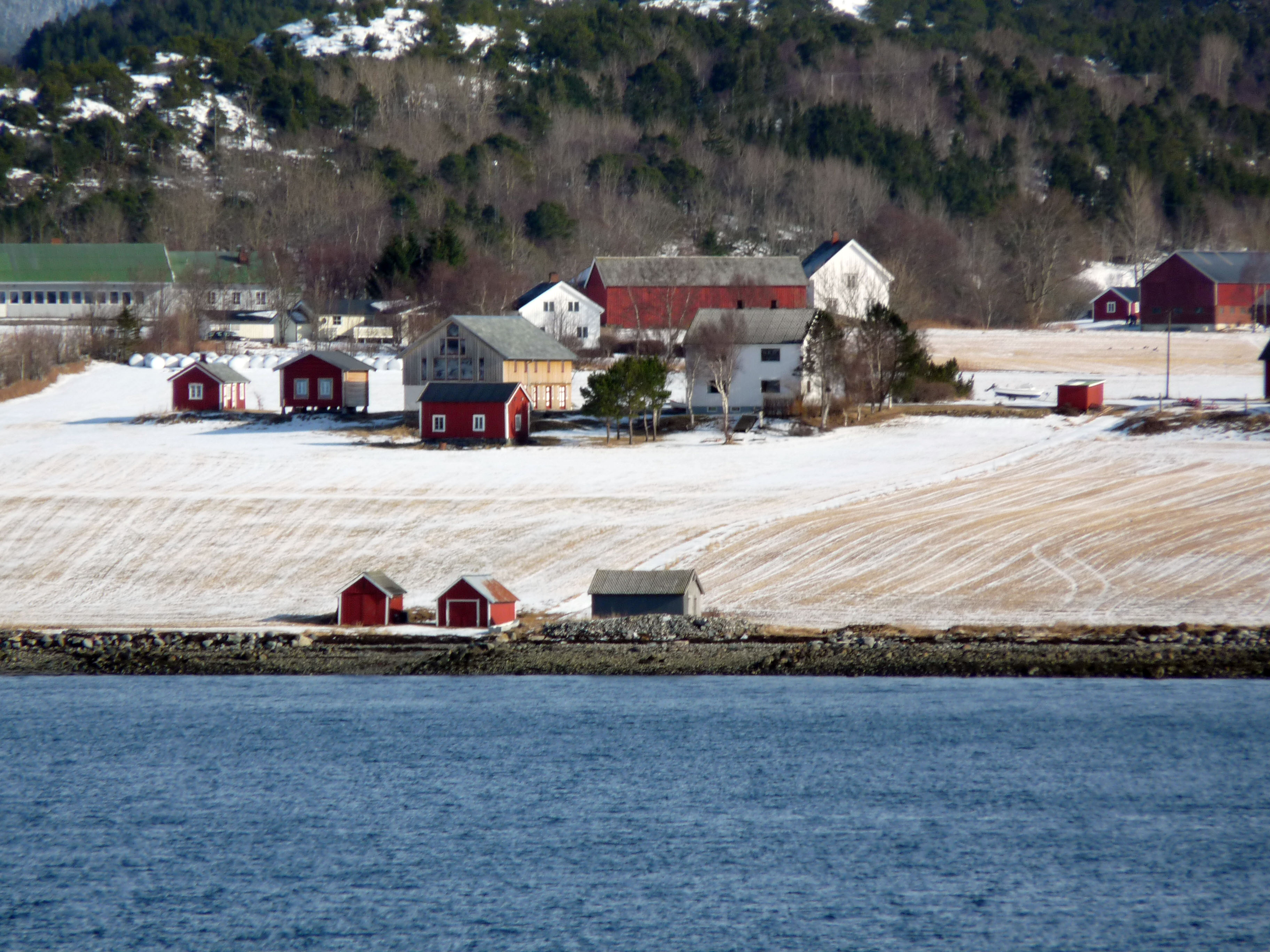
Coastal farm area along the fjord.

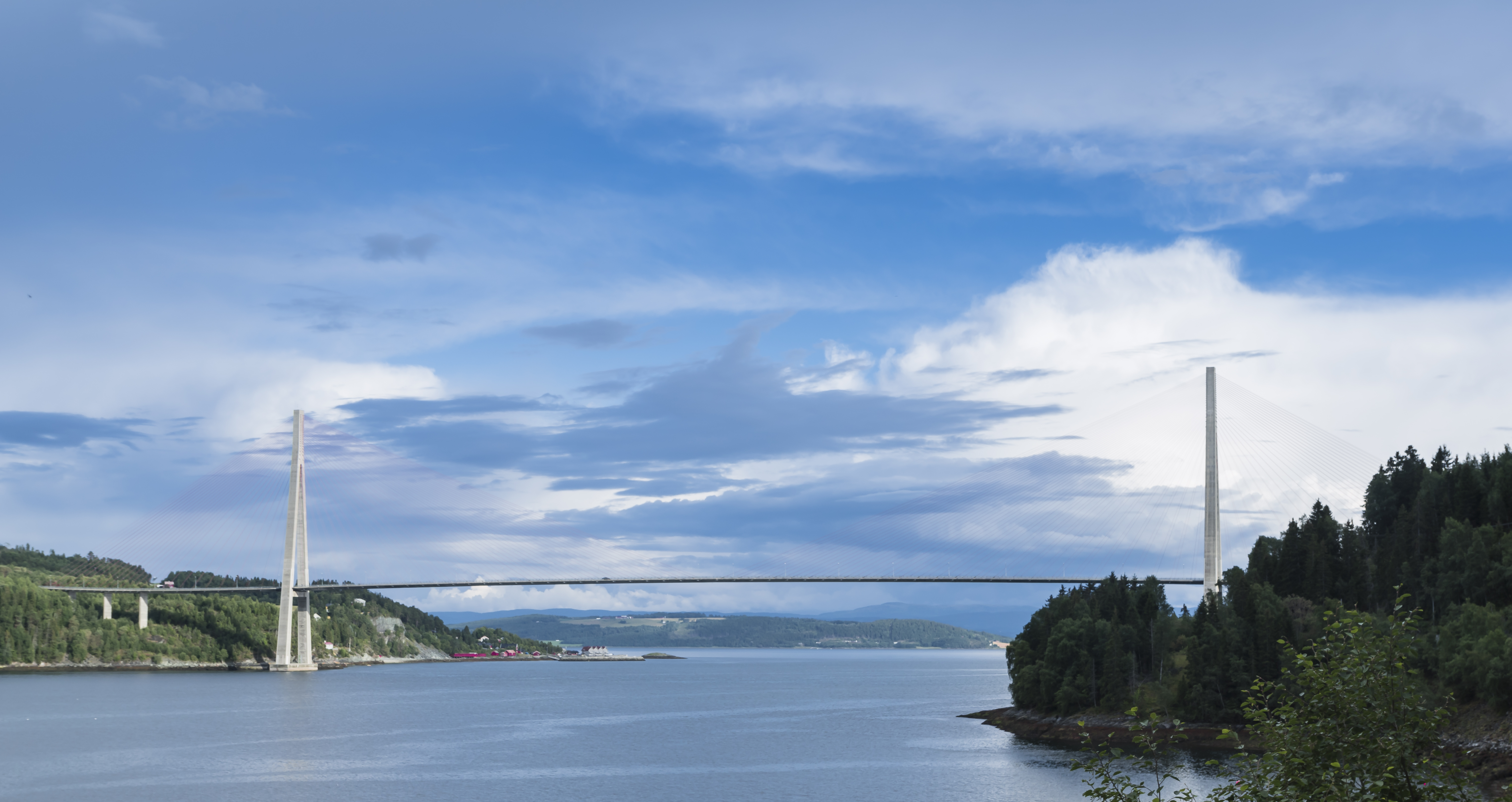
Skarnsund Bridge, the only road crossing on the fjord.

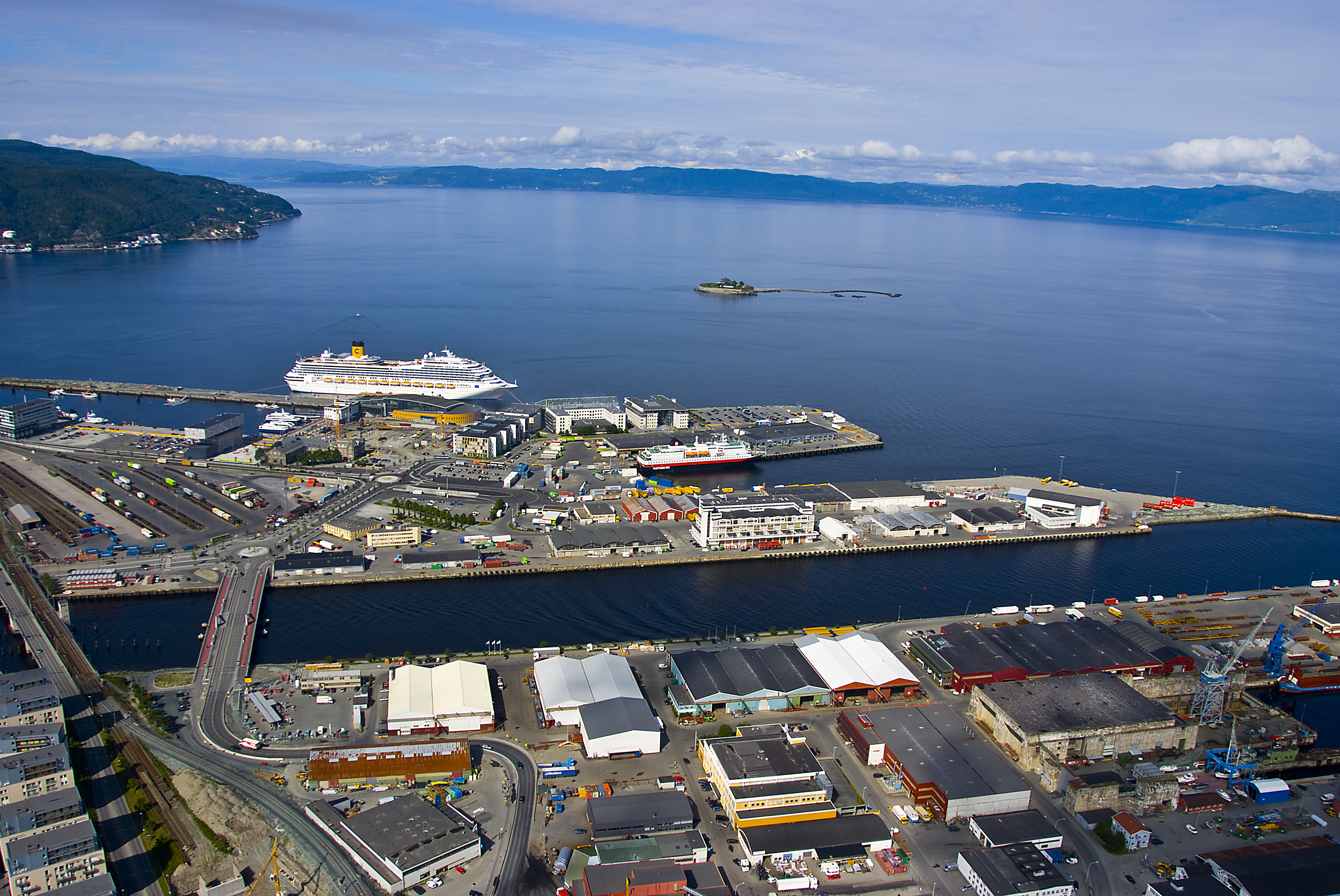
Harbour of Trondheim

== See also ==
- Ellen Lie
- Petter Lie
