= Lade, Trondheim =

Neighborhood in the city of Trondheim, Norway

Lade
- Neighborhood in Trondheim
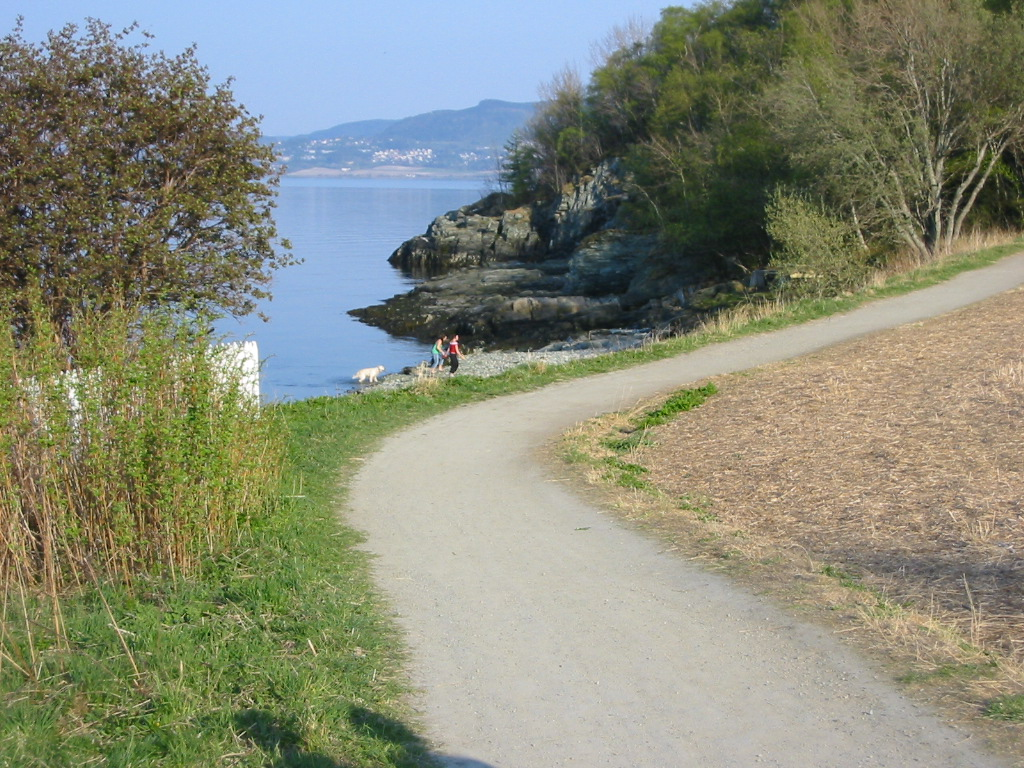
- Ladestien, the walking path along the fjord in Lade
- Interactive map of Lade
- Coordinates: 63.4463°N 10.4434°E
- Country: Norway
- Region: Central Norway
- County: Trøndelag
- Municipality: Trondheim Municipality
- Borough: Østbyen
- Elevation: 28 m (92 ft)
- Time zone: UTC+01:00 (CET)
  - Summer (DST): UTC+02:00 (CEST)

Lade (Old Norse: Hlaðir) is a neighborhood in the city of Trondheim in Trøndelag county, Norway. It is in the borough of Østbyen in Trondheim Municipality, just northeast of the city centre of Midtbyen and north of the Lademoen neighborhood. Lade is located on a peninsula bordering the Trondheimsfjord, an important waterway dating back to the Viking Age. It is the site of the historic Lade estate (Lade gaard) and of Lade Church (Lade kirke), which dates to around 1190. Lade in the tenth and eleventh centuries is sometimes called Hlathðr or Hlathir by historians.

== History ==
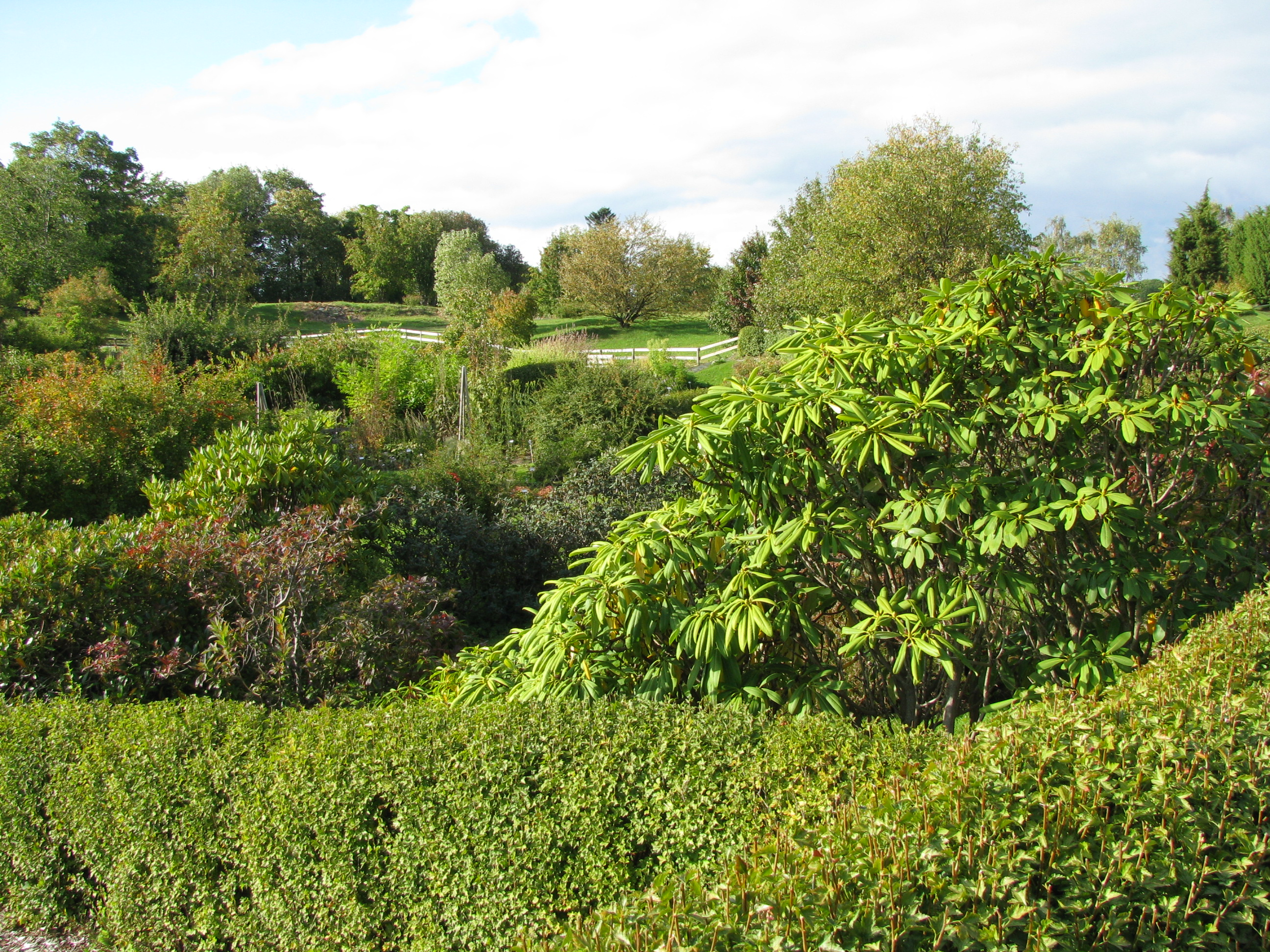
Ringve Botanical Garden

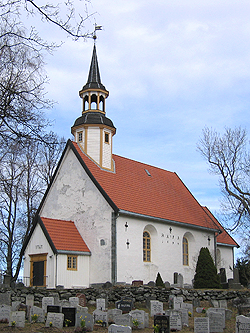
Lade Church

Historically, the Lade estate (Lade Storgård i Trondheim) was the seat of the Jarls of Lade (Ladejarler).

Another former estate at Lade, Ringve gård, is now the Ringve Museum, the national museum of music. Ringve Botanical Garden is also at Lade.

The Norwegian University of Science and Technology formerly had a campus at Lade; the buildings have been repurposed.

Most of Lade is now suburban housing, superstores, industry, and some recreational areas, and is zoned for high car access. There are two secondary schools: Ladejarlen Secondary School and Ringve Secondary School, and a primary school, Lade School Other institutions located at Lade include the shopping centre City Lade and the Norwegian Geological Survey.

Lade has one of the few beaches in Trondheim. It has become a popular area with high housing prices.

== Economy ==
- Nobø manufacturing company

== Public transportation ==
Lade is connected to Lademoen by the Nordland Line, but only two stations offer services to Lade: Haakon VII Ave and Rotvoll. In 1958, the Ladelinjen tramway was built from Lade to Prinsensgate, but in 1988 the line was closed with the rest of the Trondheim Tramway because the city of Trondheim did not have adequate funding to keep it going. Some sections have not been removed and can still be seen.

== Notable residents ==
Lade has many locally famous people living in it. Footballer Per Ciljan Skjelbred grew up there and built a house there. The multi-millionaire members of the Reitan family also live there.

== See also ==
- Våttahaugen
