= Verran Municipality =

Municipality in Trøndelag, Norway

Verran Municipality Verran kommune
- Former municipality
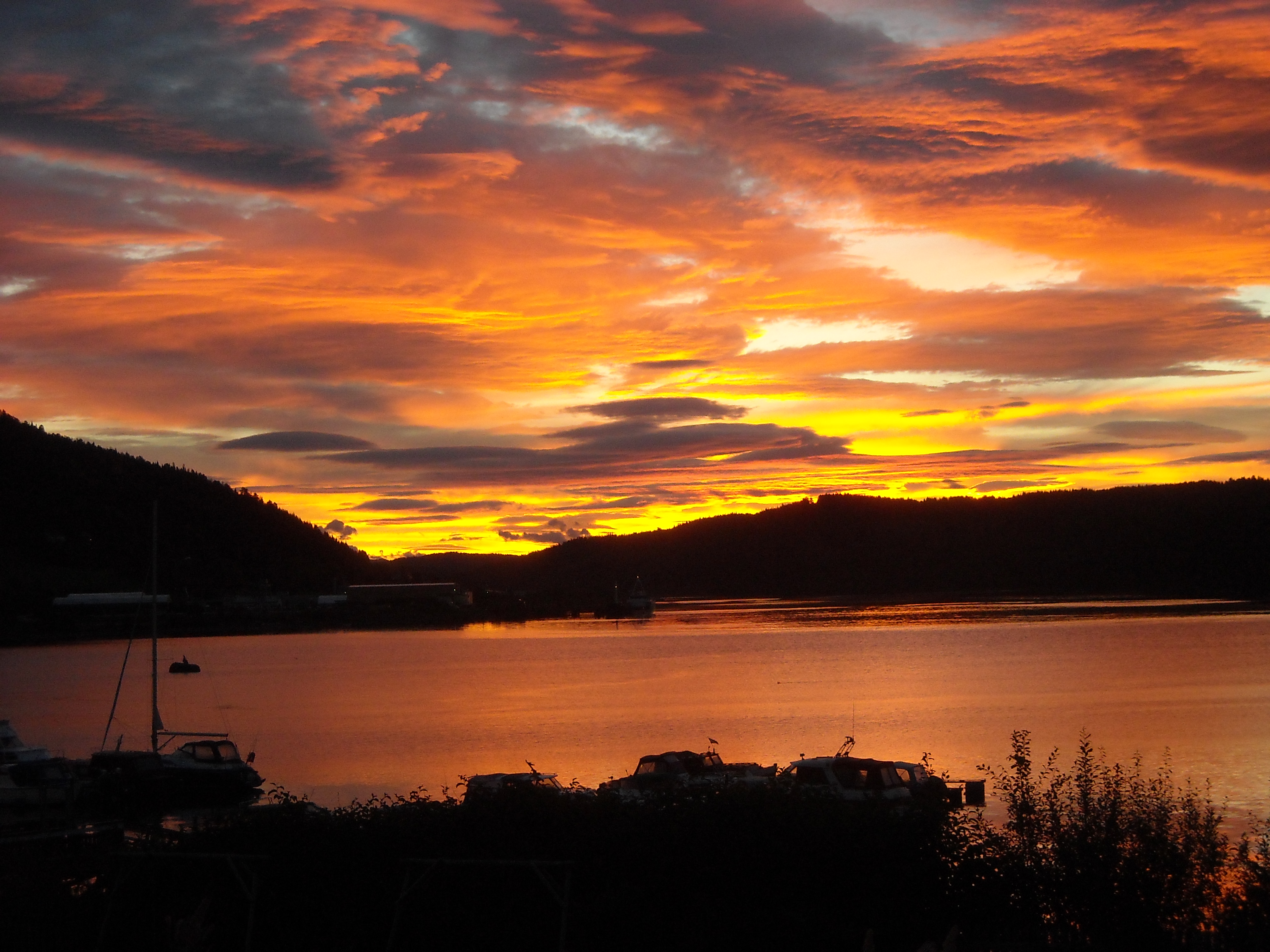
- View from Malm at sunset

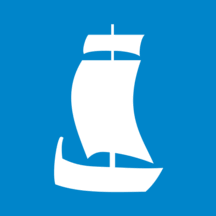
- Flag Coat of arms

- Trøndelag within Norway

- Verran within Trøndelag
- Coordinates: 64°01′27″N 10°58′44″E
- Country: Norway
- County: Trøndelag
- District: Innherad
- Established: 1 Jan 1901
  - Preceded by: Mosvik og Verran Municipality
- Disestablished: 1 Jan 2020
  - Succeeded by: Steinkjer Municipality and Indre Fosen Municipality
- Administrative centre: Malm

Government
  - Mayor (2015-2019): Anders Lindstrøm (Ap)

Area (upon dissolution)
  - Total: 601.66 km^{2} (232.30 sq mi)
  - Land: 558.15 km^{2} (215.50 sq mi)
  - Water: 43.51 km^{2} (16.80 sq mi) 7.2%
  - Rank: #185 in Norway
- Highest elevation: 655.2 m (2,150 ft)

Population (2019)
  - Total: 2,449
  - Rank: #296 in Norway
  - Density: 4.1/km^{2} (11/sq mi)
  - Change (10 years): ▼ −16.2%
- Demonym: Verrabygg

Official language
  - Norwegian form: Neutral
- Time zone: UTC+01:00 (CET)
  - Summer (DST): UTC+02:00 (CEST)
- ISO 3166 code: NO-5039

Verran is a former municipality in Trøndelag county, Norway. The municipality existed from 1901 until its dissolution in 2020 when it was divided between Steinkjer Municipality and Indre Fosen Municipality. It was part of the Innherred region. The administrative centre of the municipality was the village of Malm. Other villages in Verran included Follafoss, Sela, Verrabotn, and Verrastranda.

At the time of its dissolution in 2020, the 602-square-kilometre (232 sq mi) municipality was the 185th largest by area out of the 422 municipalities in Norway. Verran Municipality was the 296th most populous municipality in Norway with a population of 2,449. The municipality's population density was 4.1 inhabitants per square kilometre (11/sq mi) and its population had decreased by 16.2% over the last decade.

== General information ==
The municipality of Verran was established on 1 January 1901 when the old Mosvik og Verran Municipality was divided into two new municipalities: Mosvik Municipality (population: 969) and Verran Municipality (population: 1,456). During the 1960s, there were many municipal mergers across Norway due to the work of the Schei Committee. On 1 January 1964, Malm Municipality (population: 2,975) and Verran Municipality (population: 1,803) were merged to form a new, larger Verran Municipality. After the merger, there were 4,778 residents in Verran Municipality. On 1 January 1968, the Framverran area on the south side of the Verrasundet fjord (population: 395) was transferred from Verran Municipality to the neighboring Mosvik Municipality.

On 1 January 2018, the municipality switched from the old Nord-Trøndelag county to the new Trøndelag county.

On 1 January 2020, Verran Municipality was dissolved. Most of the municipality was merged with the neighboring Steinkjer Municipality to form a new, larger Steinkjer Municipality. The remaining Verrabotn area in the southwestern part of Verran Municipality was merged with the neighboring Indre Fosen Municipality.

=== Name ===
The municipality is named after the Verrasundet fjord (Old Norse: Veri), which is an arm of the great Trondheimsfjord. The meaning of the old name is probably "the quiet one" or "the fjord with still water".

=== Coat of arms ===
The coat of arms was granted on 11 September 1987 and it was in use until 1 January 2020 when the municipality was dissolved. The official blazon is "Azure, a boat with raised square sail and topsail argent" (Norwegian: I blått en sølv båt med råseil og toppseil). This means the arms have a blue field (background) and the charge is a Verranjekt (boat) with a raised square sail and topsail. The boat has a tincture of argent which means it is commonly colored white, but if it is made out of metal, then silver is used. The design was chosen to symbolize the historical importance of boating and boatbuilding for the area. The Verranjekt (literally translated as "a yacht from Verran") is a type of boat has been built in Verran for centuries. The arms were designed by Rolf Tidemann. The municipal flag has the same design as the coat of arms. After the merger of Verran and Steinkjer municipalities on 1 January 2020, these arms were adopted to represent the new Steinkjer municipality.

=== Churches ===
The Church of Norway had two parishes (sokn) within Verran Municipality. It was part of the Nord-Innherad prosti (deanery) in the Diocese of Nidaros.

Churches in Verran Municipality
Parish (sokn)	Church name	Location of the church	Year built
Malm	Malm Church	Malm	1885
Malm	Sela Church	Sela	1997
Verran	Fines Church	Verrabotn	1913
Verran	Follafoss Church	Follafoss	1954

== Geography ==
Verran bordered Åfjord Municipality to the west, Indre Fosen Municipality to the south, Inderøy Municipality to the southeast, Steinkjer Municipality to the east, and Namdalseid Municipality to the north. Verran Municipality encompassed the western coastline of the Beitstadfjord, an arm of the Trondheimsfjord. There were three large lakes in Verran: Ormsetvatnet, Selavatnet, and Holden. The river Follaelva flowed through the municipality, emptying into the Trondheimsfjord at Follafoss. The highest point in the municipality was the 655.2-metre (2,150 ft) tall mountain Sandvassheia.

== Government ==
While it existed, Verran Municipality was responsible for primary education (through 10th grade), outpatient health services, senior citizen services, welfare and other social services, zoning, economic development, and municipal roads and utilities. The municipality was governed by a municipal council of directly elected representatives. The mayor was indirectly elected by a vote of the municipal council. The municipality was under the jurisdiction of the Inntrøndelag District Court and the Frostating Court of Appeal.

=== Municipal council ===
The municipal council (Kommunestyre) of Verran Municipality was made up of 19 representatives that are elected to four year terms. The tables below show the historical composition of the council by political party.

Verran kommunestyre 2015–2019
Party name (in Norwegian)	Number of representatives
Labour Party (Arbeiderpartiet)	7
Progress Party (Fremskrittspartiet)	1
Conservative Party (Høyre)	1
Centre Party (Senterpartiet)	7
Liberal Party (Venstre)	3
Total number of members:	19
Note: On 1 January 2020, Verran Municipality became part of Steinkjer Municipality.

Verran kommunestyre 2011–2015
Party name (in Norwegian)	Number of representatives
Labour Party (Arbeiderpartiet)	7
Progress Party (Fremskrittspartiet)	1
Centre Party (Senterpartiet)	6
Liberal Party (Venstre)	5
Total number of members:	19

Verran kommunestyre 2007–2011
Party name (in Norwegian)	Number of representatives
Labour Party (Arbeiderpartiet)	9
Progress Party (Fremskrittspartiet)	2
Christian Democratic Party (Kristelig Folkeparti)	1
Centre Party (Senterpartiet)	4
Liberal Party (Venstre)	2
Local list in Verran (Bygdalista i Verran)	1
Total number of members:	19

Verran kommunestyre 2003–2007
Party name (in Norwegian)	Number of representatives
Labour Party (Arbeiderpartiet)	10
Progress Party (Fremskrittspartiet)	2
Conservative Party (Høyre)	1
Christian Democratic Party (Kristelig Folkeparti)	1
Centre Party (Senterpartiet)	5
Socialist Left Party (Sosialistisk Venstreparti)	3
Liberal Party (Venstre)	2
Non-party local list (Upolitisk Bygdeliste)	1
Total number of members:	25

Verran kommunestyre 1999–2003
Party name (in Norwegian)	Number of representatives
Labour Party (Arbeiderpartiet)	11
Centre Party (Senterpartiet)	9
Liberal Party (Venstre)	1
Joint list of the Conservative Party (Høyre) and Christian Democratic Party (Kristelig Folkeparti)	3
Non-party local list (Upolitisk bygdeliste)	1
Total number of members:	25

Verran kommunestyre 1995–1999
Party name (in Norwegian)	Number of representatives
Labour Party (Arbeiderpartiet)	9
Centre Party (Senterpartiet)	11
Liberal Party (Venstre)	1
Joint list: Socialist Left Party and independent socialists (Fellesliste: Sosialistisk Venstreparti og Uavhengige Sosialiste)	1
Joint list of the Conservative Party (Høyre) and Christian Democratic Party (Kristelig Folkeparti)	2
Non-party local list (Upolitisk Bygdeliste)	1
Total number of members:	25

Verran kommunestyre 1991–1995
Party name (in Norwegian)	Number of representatives
Labour Party (Arbeiderpartiet)	11
Conservative Party (Høyre)	1
Centre Party (Senterpartiet)	7
Joint list: Socialist Left Party and independent socialists (Fellesliste: Sosialistisk Venstreparti og Uavhengige Sosialiste)	4
Joint list: Pensioners' Party and potential homeowners (Fellesliste: Pensjonister og potensielle hjemmesittere)	2
Total number of members:	25

Verran kommunestyre 1987–1991
Party name (in Norwegian)	Number of representatives
Labour Party (Arbeiderpartiet)	11
Conservative Party (Høyre)	2
Christian Democratic Party (Kristelig Folkeparti)	1
Centre Party (Senterpartiet)	6
Liberal Party (Venstre)	1
Joint list: Socialist Left Party and independent socialists (Fellesliste: Sosialistisk Venstreparti og Uavhengige Sosialiste)	4
Total number of members:	25

Verran kommunestyre 1983–1987
Party name (in Norwegian)	Number of representatives
Labour Party (Arbeiderpartiet)	15
Conservative Party (Høyre)	2
Christian Democratic Party (Kristelig Folkeparti)	1
Centre Party (Senterpartiet)	4
Socialist Left Party (Sosialistisk Venstreparti)	2
Liberal Party (Venstre)	1
Total number of members:	25

Verran kommunestyre 1979–1983
Party name (in Norwegian)	Number of representatives
Labour Party (Arbeiderpartiet)	13
Conservative Party (Høyre)	2
Christian Democratic Party (Kristelig Folkeparti)	1
Centre Party (Senterpartiet)	6
Liberal Party (Venstre)	1
Non-party and independents list (Upolitisk og uavhengig liste)	2
Total number of members:	25

Verran kommunestyre 1975–1979
Party name (in Norwegian)	Number of representatives
Labour Party (Arbeiderpartiet)	16
Conservative Party (Høyre)	1
Christian Democratic Party (Kristelig Folkeparti)	1
New People's Party (Nye Folkepartiet)	1
Centre Party (Senterpartiet)	3
Socialist Left Party (Sosialistisk Venstreparti)	2
Liberal Party (Venstre)	1
Total number of members:	25

Verran kommunestyre 1971–1975
Party name (in Norwegian)	Number of representatives
Labour Party (Arbeiderpartiet)	16
Christian Democratic Party (Kristelig Folkeparti)	1
Centre Party (Senterpartiet)	3
Socialist People's Party (Sosialistisk Folkeparti)	2
Liberal Party (Venstre)	3
Total number of members:	25

Verran kommunestyre 1967–1971
Party name (in Norwegian)	Number of representatives
Labour Party (Arbeiderpartiet)	15
Christian Democratic Party (Kristelig Folkeparti)	1
Centre Party (Senterpartiet)	3
Socialist People's Party (Sosialistisk Folkeparti)	3
Liberal Party (Venstre)	3
Total number of members:	25

Verran kommunestyre 1963–1967
Party name (in Norwegian)	Number of representatives
Labour Party (Arbeiderpartiet)	18
Communist Party (Kommunistiske Parti)	1
Christian Democratic Party (Kristelig Folkeparti)	1
Centre Party (Senterpartiet)	5
Liberal Party (Venstre)	4
Total number of members:	29
Note: On 1 January 1964, Malm Municipality became part of Verran Municipality.

Verran herredsstyre 1959–1963
Party name (in Norwegian)	Number of representatives
Labour Party (Arbeiderpartiet)	11
Joint List(s) of Non-Socialist Parties (Borgerlige Felleslister)	5
Local List(s) (Lokale lister)	1
Total number of members:	17

Verran herredsstyre 1955–1959
Party name (in Norwegian)	Number of representatives
Labour Party (Arbeiderpartiet)	10
Communist Party (Kommunistiske Parti)	1
Joint List(s) of Non-Socialist Parties (Borgerlige Felleslister)	6
Total number of members:	17

Verran herredsstyre 1951–1955
Party name (in Norwegian)	Number of representatives
Labour Party (Arbeiderpartiet)	8
Communist Party (Kommunistiske Parti)	2
Joint List(s) of Non-Socialist Parties (Borgerlige Felleslister)	5
Local List(s) (Lokale lister)	1
Total number of members:	16

Verran herredsstyre 1947–1951
Party name (in Norwegian)	Number of representatives
Labour Party (Arbeiderpartiet)	8
Communist Party (Kommunistiske Parti)	2
Joint List(s) of Non-Socialist Parties (Borgerlige Felleslister)	6
Total number of members:	16

Verran herredsstyre 1945–1947
Party name (in Norwegian)	Number of representatives
Labour Party (Arbeiderpartiet)	6
Communist Party (Kommunistiske Parti)	2
Joint List(s) of Non-Socialist Parties (Borgerlige Felleslister)	4
Total number of members:	12

Verran herredsstyre 1937–1941*
Party name (in Norwegian)	Number of representatives
Labour Party (Arbeiderpartiet)	7
Local List(s) (Lokale lister)	5
Total number of members:	12
Note: Due to the German occupation of Norway during World War II, no elections were held for new municipal councils until after the war ended in 1945.

=== Mayors ===
The mayor (Norwegian: ordfører) of Verran Municipality was the political leader of the municipality and the chairperson of the municipal council. Here is a list of people who held this position:

- 1901–1904: Jørginus Stavrum (V)
- 1905–1910: Jørginus Grande (H)
- 1911–1928: Gunnar Aftret (V)
- 1928–1928: Arne Karlsen (LL)
- 1929–1931: John M. Viken (Ap)
- 1932–1934: Tomas Stavrum (LL)
- 1935–1942: Gunvald Engelstad (Ap)
- 1943–1945: Otto Sandhaug (NS)
- 1945–1945: Gunvald Engelstad (Ap)
- 1946–1947: Nils Kvam (Ap)
- 1948–1950: Toralf Aalberg (Ap)
- 1951–1953: Magne Følstad (Ap)
- 1954–1963: Toralf Aalberg (Ap)
- 1964–1971: Olav Stavrum (Ap)
- 1972–1979: Arthur Mogstad (Ap)
- 1980–1993: Rolf Ystmark (Ap)
- 1993–2003: Bjørn Skjelstad (Sp)
- 2003–2004: Kåre Olsen (Ap)
- 2004–2007: Robert Bjørk (Ap)
- 2007–2011: Frank Christiansen (Ap)
- 2011–2015: Bjørn Skjelstad (Sp)
- 2015–2019: Anders Lindstrøm (Ap)

== Economy ==
Forestry was an important industry in Verran. There was also a paper mill in Follafoss that is a large factory. The paper mill was owned by Södra Cell Folla.

== See also ==
- List of former municipalities of Norway
