= Tørrissen =

Tørrissen is a Norwegian surname. Notable people with the surname include:

- Berger Torrissen (1901–1991), Norwegian-born American skier
- Erik Tørrissen (born 1988), Norwegian yachtsman and politician
- Johannes Tørrissen Worum (1817–1889), Norwegian politician
