= Ytterøy Municipality =

Former municipality in Trøndelag, Norway

Ytterøy Municipality Ytterøy herred
- Former municipality
- Ytterøen herred (historic name)
- Nord-Trøndelag within Norway

- Ytterøy within Nord-Trøndelag
- Coordinates: 63°46′55″N 11°03′15″E
- Country: Norway
- County: Nord-Trøndelag
- District: Innherred
- Established: 1 Jan 1838
  - Created as: Formannskapsdistrikt
- Disestablished: 1 Jan 1964
  - Succeeded by: Levanger Municipality
- Administrative centre: Ytterøy

Government
  - Mayor (1956–1963): Henrik J. Sandstad (Sp)

Area (upon dissolution)
  - Total: 27.8 km^{2} (10.7 sq mi)
  - Rank: #617 in Norway
- Highest elevation: 210 m (690 ft)

Population (1963)
  - Total: 803
  - Rank: #646 in Norway
  - Density: 28.9/km^{2} (75/sq mi)
  - Change (10 years): ▲ +7.9%
- Demonym: Ytterøyning

Official language
  - Norwegian form: Bokmål
- Time zone: UTC+01:00 (CET)
  - Summer (DST): UTC+02:00 (CEST)
- ISO 3166 code: NO-1722

Ytterøy is a former municipality in the old Nord-Trøndelag county, Norway. The municipality existed from 1838 until its dissolution in 1964. Originally, it was a large municipality that encompassed the island of Ytterøya and parts of the mainland to the northwest of the island on the west side of the Trondheimsfjord. By 1964 when it was dissolved, Ytterøy only included the 28 square kilometres (11 sq mi) island of Ytterøya. Since 1964, the island has been part of what is now Levanger Municipality in Trøndelag county. The island is connected to the rest of the municipality by the Levanger–Hokstad Ferry that crosses the Trondheimsfjord. The main church for the municipality was Ytterøy Church.

Prior to its dissolution in 1964, the 27.8-square-kilometre (10.7 sq mi) municipality was the 617th largest by area out of the 689 municipalities in Norway. Ytterøy Municipality was the 646th most populous municipality in Norway with a population of about 803. The municipality's population density was 28.9 inhabitants per square kilometre (75/sq mi) and its population had increased by 7.9% over the previous 10-year period.

== General information ==
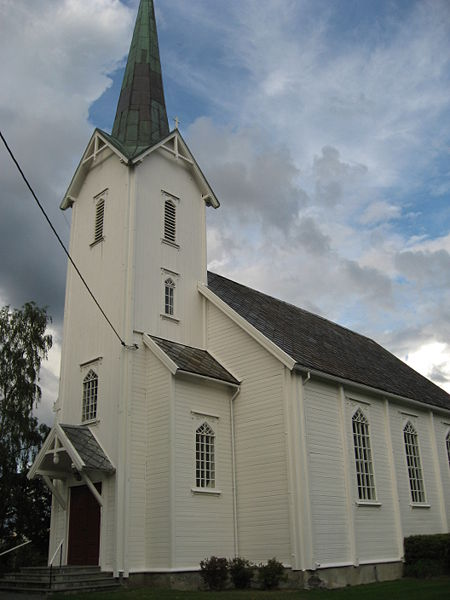
Ytterøy Church

The prestegjeld of Ytterøy was established as a municipality on 1 January 1838 (see formannskapsdistrikt law). On 1 January 1867, the mainland part of the municipality was separated from Ytterøy to form the new Mosvik og Verran Municipality (population: 2,949). This left a much smaller Ytterøy Municipality with 1,499 residents living on the island of Ytterøya. During the 1960s, there were many municipal mergers across Norway due to the work of the Schei Committee. On 1 January 1964, Ytterøy Municipality was merged with the neighboring Levanger Municipality on the mainland. Prior to the merger, Ytterøy Municipality had 772 residents.

=== Name ===
The municipality (originally the parish) is named after the island of Ytterøya (Old Norse: Øyin ýtri, or more recently Ýtriøy) since the first Ytterøy Church was built there. The first element of the original name is the definite singular form of øy which means "island". The last element is ýtri which means "outer". Thus the meaning of the name is "the outer island" (as opposed to the nearby Inderøya which means "the inner island"). Historically, the name of the municipality was spelled Ytterøen. On 3 November 1917, a royal resolution changed the spelling of the name of the municipality to Ytterøy.

=== Churches ===
The Church of Norway had one parish (sokn) within Ytterøy Municipality. At the time of the municipal dissolution, it was part of the Ytterøy prestegjeld and the Sør-Innherad prosti (deanery) in the Diocese of Nidaros.

Churches in Ytterøy Municipality
Parish (sokn)	Church name	Location of the church	Year built
Ytterøy	Ytterøy Church	Ytterøya	1890

== Geography ==
The highest point in the municipality was the 210-metre (690 ft) tall mountain Sandstadheia on the western end of the island of Ytterøya.

== Government ==
While it existed, Ytterøy Municipality was responsible for primary education (through 10th grade), outpatient health services, senior citizen services, welfare and other social services, zoning, economic development, and municipal roads and utilities. The municipality was governed by a municipal council of directly elected representatives. The mayor was indirectly elected by a vote of the municipal council. The municipality was under the jurisdiction of the Frostating Court of Appeal.

=== Municipal council ===
The municipal council (Herredsstyre) of Ytterøy Municipality was made up of 13 representatives that were elected to four year terms. The tables below show the historical composition of the council by political party.

Ytterøy herredsstyre 1959–1963
Party name (in Norwegian)	Number of representatives
Labour Party (Arbeiderpartiet)	3
Conservative Party (Høyre)	1
Christian Democratic Party (Kristelig Folkeparti)	2
Centre Party (Senterpartiet)	5
List of workers, fishermen, and small farmholders (Arbeidere, fiskere, småbrukere liste)	2
Total number of members:	13
Note: On 1 January 1964, Ytterøy Municipality became part of Levanger Municipality.

Ytterøy herredsstyre 1955–1959
Party name (in Norwegian)	Number of representatives
Labour Party (Arbeiderpartiet)	4
Conservative Party (Høyre)	1
Farmers' Party (Bondepartiet)	5
List of workers, fishermen, and small farmholders (Arbeidere, fiskere, småbrukere liste)	3
Total number of members:	13

Ytterøy herredsstyre 1951–1955
Party name (in Norwegian)	Number of representatives
Labour Party (Arbeiderpartiet)	3
List of workers, fishermen, and small farmholders (Arbeidere, fiskere, småbrukere liste)	2
Joint List(s) of Non-Socialist Parties (Borgerlige Felleslister)	7
Total number of members:	12

Ytterøy herredsstyre 1947–1951
Party name (in Norwegian)	Number of representatives
Labour Party (Arbeiderpartiet)	3
List of workers, fishermen, and small farmholders (Arbeidere, fiskere, småbrukere liste)	3
Joint List(s) of Non-Socialist Parties (Borgerlige Felleslister)	6
Total number of members:	12

Ytterøy herredsstyre 1945–1947
Party name (in Norwegian)	Number of representatives
Labour Party (Arbeiderpartiet)	1
List of workers, fishermen, and small farmholders (Arbeidere, fiskere, småbrukere liste)	5
Joint List(s) of Non-Socialist Parties (Borgerlige Felleslister)	6
Total number of members:	12

Ytterøy herredsstyre 1937–1941*
Party name (in Norwegian)	Number of representatives
Labour Party (Arbeiderpartiet)	3
Liberal Party (Venstre)	3
Local List(s) (Lokale lister)	6
Total number of members:	12
Note: Due to the German occupation of Norway during World War II, no elections were held for new municipal councils until after the war ended in 1945.

=== Mayors ===
The mayor (Norwegian: ordfører) of Ytterøy Municipality was the political leader of the municipality and the chairperson of the municipal council. Here is a list of people who held this position:

- 1838–1839: Anthon P. Jenssen
- 1840–1843: Anders Sandstad
- 1844–1847: Anthon P. Jenssen
- 1848–1851: Johannes Tørrissen Worum
- 1852–1855: Anders Sandstad
- 1856–1859: Johannes Tørrissen Worum
- 1860–1861: Anders Sandstad
- 1862–1866: Benedict Jenssen
- 1867–1871: Anders Sandstad
- 1872–1873: John Guldahl
- 1874–1875: Martinus Barstad
- 1876–1881: John Guldahl
- 1882–1884: Peder Sandstad (V)
- 1885–1894: Anders Møen (V)
- 1895–1902: Peder Sandstad (V)
- 1903–1922: Anton Faanes (V)
- 1923–1928: Sofus Vigen (H)
- 1929–1931: John Vigen (H)
- 1932–1937: Sofus Vigen (H)
- 1938-1938: Johannes Stavrum (Bp)
- 1938–1941: Ingmar Nøst (Bp)
- 1942–1945: Nils Myhr (NS)
- 1945–1955: Ingmar Nøst (Bp)
- 1956–1963: Henrik J. Sandstad (Bp)

== See also ==
- List of former municipalities of Norway
