= Mosvik og Verran Municipality =

Former municipality in Trøndelag, Norway

Mosvik og Verran Municipality Mosvik og Verran herred
- Former municipality
- Nord-Trøndelag within Norway

- Mosvik og Verran within Nord-Trøndelag
- Coordinates: 63°54′09″N 10°54′37″E
- Country: Norway
- County: Nord-Trøndelag
- District: Innherred
- Established: 1 Jan 1867
  - Preceded by: Ytterøy Municipality
- Disestablished: 1 Jan 1901
  - Succeeded by: Mosvik Municipality and Verran Municipality
- Administrative centre: Mosvik

Government
  - Mayor (1899–1901): Jørginius Stavrum

Area (upon dissolution)
  - Total: 551.91 km^{2} (213.09 sq mi)
- Highest elevation: 655.2 m (2,150 ft)

Population (1901)
  - Total: 2,425
  - Density: 4.394/km^{2} (11.38/sq mi)
- Demonym(s): Mosbygg; Verrabygg
- Time zone: UTC+01:00 (CET)
  - Summer (DST): UTC+02:00 (CEST)
- ISO 3166 code: NO-1723

Mosvik og Verran is a former municipality in the old Nord-Trøndelag county in Norway. The 552-square-kilometre (213 sq mi) municipality existed from 1867 until 1901 when it was split into two. It was located on the Fosen peninsula, on the west side of the Trondheimsfjord. It included the southern part of what is now Inderøy Municipality and the western part of the present-day Steinkjer Municipality. The municipality was centered around the Verrasundet strait, a branch of the Trondheimsfjord. The administrative centre was the village of Mosvik where the Mosvik Church was located.

== History ==
The municipality of Mosvik og Verran was established on 1 January 1867 when the western part of the large Ytterøy Municipality was separated to form a this new municipality. Initially, Mosvik og Verran Municipality had a population of 2,949. On 1 January 1901, Mosvik og Verran Municipality was divided to create two new municipalities: Mosvik Municipality (population: 969) in the southeast and Verran Municipality (population: 1,456) in the north and west. In 2012, Mosvik Municipality merged into the neighboring Inderøy Municipality. On 1 January 1964, Malm Municipality was merged with Verran Municipality to form a new, larger Verran Municipality. Then on 1 January 2020, Verran Municipality became part of Steinkjer Municipality.

=== Name ===
The municipal name is a compound name made up of the two parishes that made up the municipality, literally meaning Mosvik and Verran.

The first part was named after the village of Mosvik (Old Norse: Masarvík) since the first Mosvik Church was built there. The first element is the genitive case of the river name Mǫs (now called the Mossa river). The meaning of the river name is unknown. The last element is vík which means "inlet" or "cove". Historically, the name of the municipality was spelled Mosviken. On 3 November 1917, a royal resolution changed the spelling of the name of the municipality to Mosvik, removing the definite form ending -en.

The second part is named after the Verrasundet fjord (Old Norse: Veri), which is an arm of the great Trondheimsfjord. The meaning of the old name is probably "the quiet one" or "the fjord with still water".

== Geography ==
The highest point in the municipality was the 655.2-metre (2,150 ft) tall mountain Sandvassheia on the border with Malm Municipality.

== Government ==
While it existed, Mosvik og Verran Municipality was governed by a municipal council of directly elected representatives. The mayor was indirectly elected by a vote of the municipal council. The municipality was under the jurisdiction of the Frostating Court of Appeal.

=== Mayors ===
The mayor (Norwegian: ordfører) of Mosvik og Verran Municipality was the political leader of the municipality and the chairperson of the municipal council. Here is a list of people who held this position:

- 1867–1882: Benedict Jenssen
- 1883–1898: Martin Følstad
- 1899–1901: Jørginius Stavrum

== See also ==
- List of former municipalities of Norway
