= Beitstadfjorden =

Fjord in Trøndelag, Norway

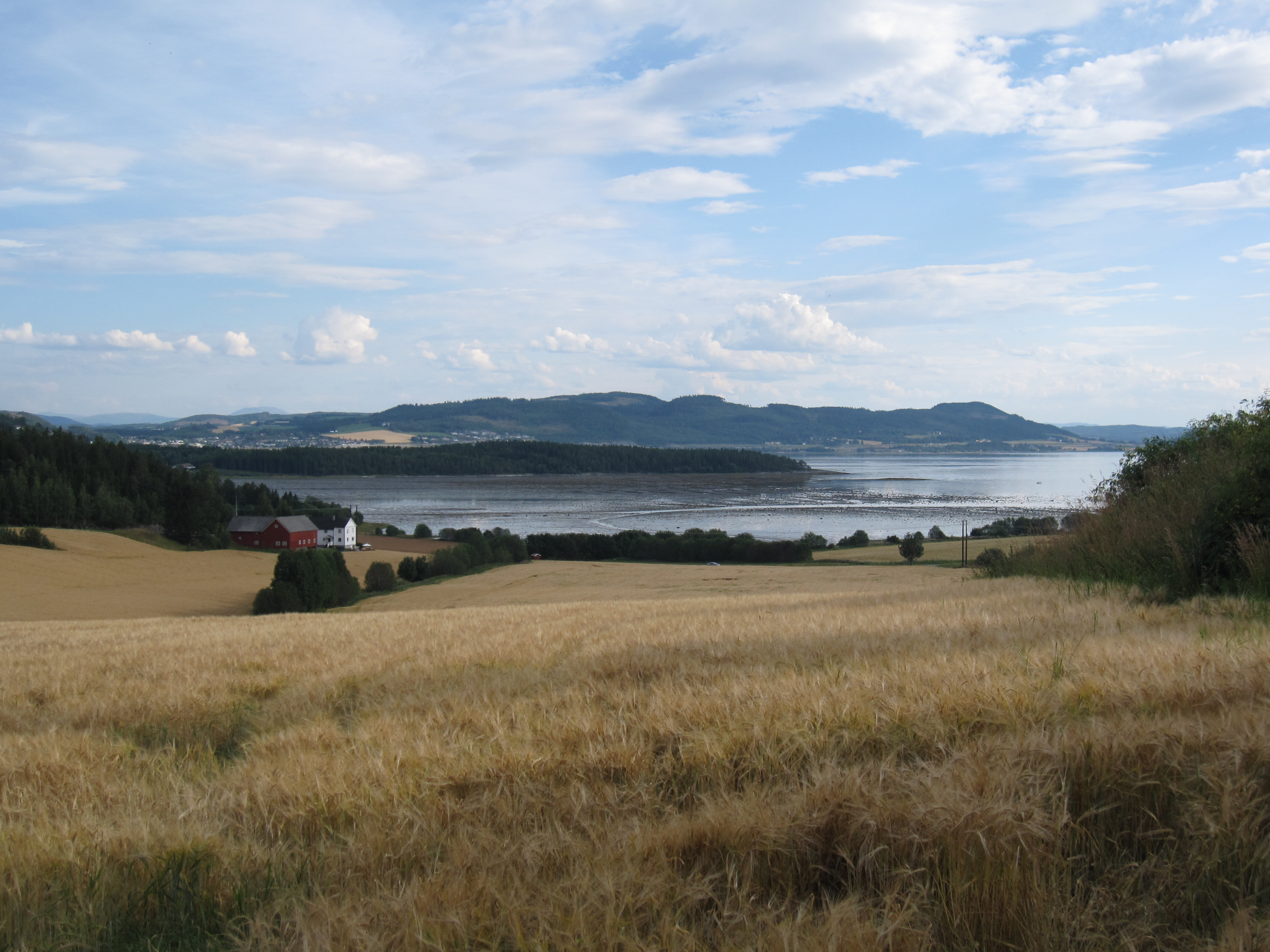
- View of the fjord
- Interactive map of the fjord
- Location: Trøndelag county, Norway
- Coordinates: 63.93413°N 11.08086°E
- Type: Fjord
- Primary outflows: Trondheimsfjorden
- Basin countries: Norway
- Max. length: 28 kilometres (17 mi)
- Max. width: 6 to 8 km (3.7 to 5.0 mi)

Beitstadfjorden (Urban East Norwegian: [ˈbæ̂ɪtstɑˌfjuːɳ]) is the innermost arm of the Trondheimsfjord in Trøndelag county, Norway. It is located in Steinkjer Municipality, Inderøy Municipality, and a small part extends into Indre Fosen Municipality. The fjord has a length of 28 kilometres (17 mi) from southwest to northeast, and a width of about 6 to 8 kilometres (3.7 to 5.0 mi).

The fjord begins at the Skarnsund strait in the south and extends northeast to the city of Steinkjer. On the far western part of the fjord, the Verrasundet strait extends south to the village of Verrabotn in Indre Fosen Municipality, while in the north the Beitstad strait stretches northward past the villages of Malm, Beitstad, and Vellamelen. In Inderøy Municipality, the villages of Kjerknesvågen and Breivika are located along the shoreline. Follafoss is located along the north side of the fjord.

== See also ==
- List of Norwegian fjords
