= Trongsundet =

Village in Inderøy Municipality, Norway

- Village
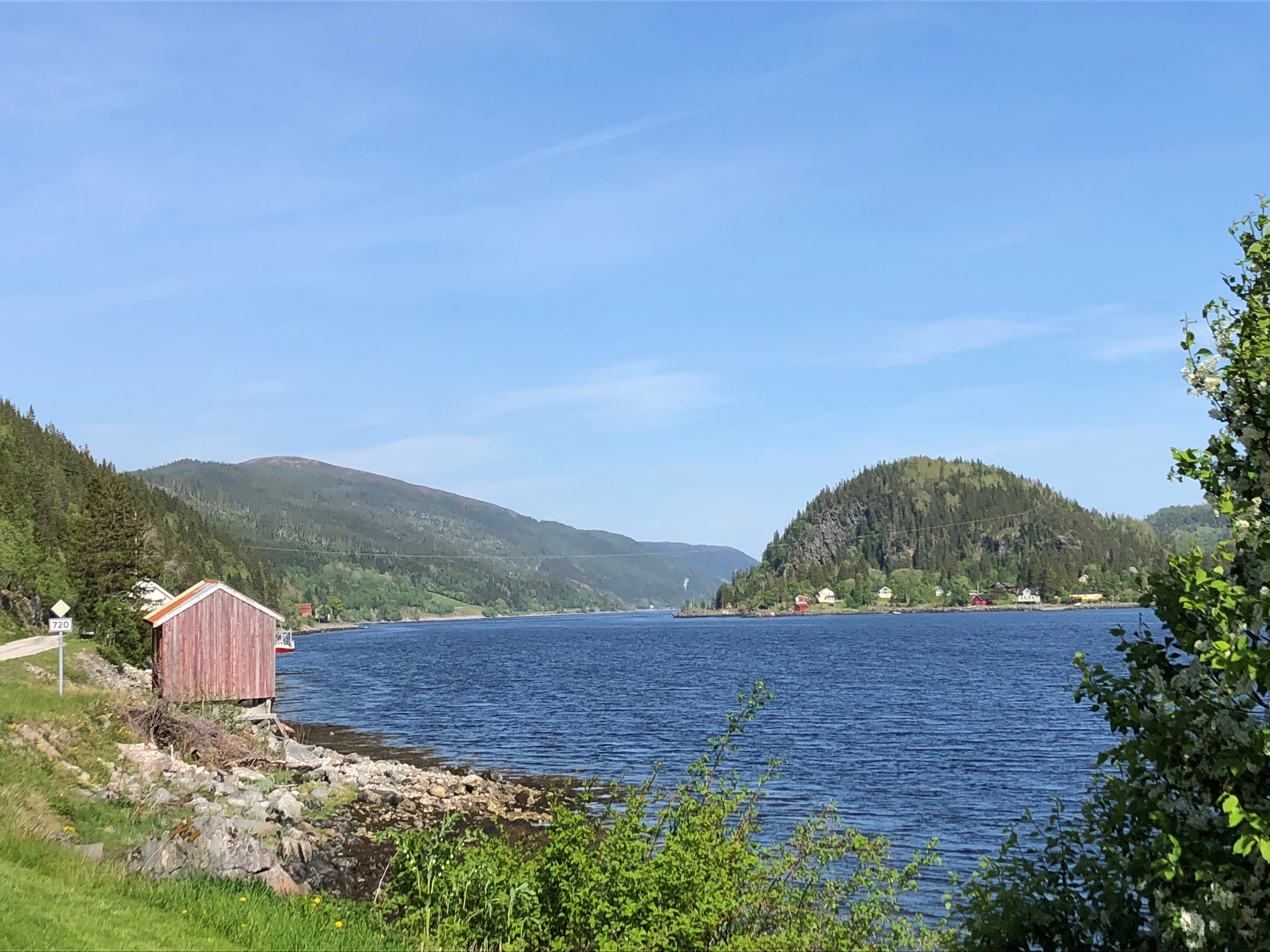
- View of the village
- Interactive map of Trongsundet
- Location within Trøndelag Location within Norway
- Coordinates: 63.8349°N 10.6937°E
- Country: Norway
- Region: Central Norway
- County: Trøndelag
- District: Innherred
- Municipality: Inderøy Municipality
- Elevation: 16 m (52 ft)
- Time zone: UTC+01:00 (CET)
  - Summer (DST): UTC+02:00 (CEST)
- Post Code: 7690 Mosvik

Trongsundet is a village in Inderøy Municipality in Trøndelag county, Norway. The village is located along the Verrasundet, an arm of the Trondheimsfjord, about 10 kilometres (6.2 mi) northeast of the village of Verrabotn (in the neighboring Indre Fosen Municipality) and about 15 kilometres (9.3 mi) southwest of the village of Framverran.
