= ScanWind =

Norwegian manufacturing company

ScanWind Group AS
- Company type: Private
- Industry: Manufacturing
- Founded: 1999
- Defunct: 2009
- Fate: Acquired
- Successor: General Electric
- Headquarters: Trondheim, Norway
- Key people: Inge Skulstad Garshol (CEO); Svein Sivertsen (Chairman)
- Products: wind turbines
- Revenue: NOK 127 million (2006)
- Operating income: NOK -51 million (2006)
- Net income: NOK -52 million (2006)
- Number of employees: 45 (2009)
- Parent: Nord-Trøndelag Elektrisitetsverk

ScanWind was a Norwegian manufacturing company that produced wind turbines. In 2009 Scanwind was bought by General Electric, and became the base for GE Wind Energy in Norway. The company had its head office in Trondheim and production facilities in Verdal Municipality, both Norway, as well as engineering division in Karlstad, Sweden. The company was founded in 1999.

Models produced by ScanWind include: ScanWind 3000 DL with an output of 3.0 megawatts (4,000 hp) and ScanWind 3500 DL at 3.5 megawatts (4,700 hp). These windmills have been installed in the Hundhammerfjellet wind farm in the old Nærøy Municipality, owned by NTE.
