= FollaCell =

Paper mill in Norway

- Type: Private
- Industry: Pulp and Paper Industry
- Founded: 1908
- Headquarters: Steinkjer, Norway
- Key people: Odd Morten Aalberg (Manager)
- Products: CTMP pulp
- Number of employees: 69 (2009)
- Parent: Mayr-Melnhof
- Website: http://www.mm-karton.com/en/company/mills/follacell/

FollaCell is a paper mill located in the village of Follafoss in Steinkjer Municipality in Trøndelag county, Norway. The mill produces 130,000 tonnes of CTMP pulp per year, and is owned by Mayr-Melnhof.

== History ==
Folla Bruk AS traditionally owned 170 square kilometers (66 sq mi) of land in the old Verran Municipality, including 50 square kilometers (19 sq mi) of productive forest. A pulp mill was established at Follafoss in 1908. In 1919, the company was bought by Nord-Trøndelag County Municipality. In 1982, the company was sold cheaply to Bjørn Lyng. In 1988, the plant was sold to Norske Skog. Norske Skog sold the plant to Södra in 2000. The current plant was taken into use 1984. In 2007, the power company Nord-Trøndelag Elektrisitetsverk, owned by Nord-Trøndelag County Municipality, was investigated by the EFTA Surveillance Authority (ESA) for illegal subsidizing Södra Cell Folla with cheap electricity. In 2010, ESA concluded that although there had been given selective subsidies, it was not illegal. On August 28, 2012, Södra announced that it was ending its ownership and involvement with Södra Cell Folla.

On 20 December 2012 it was announced that the Austria's Mayr-Melnhof has signed a Letter of Intent with Södra where they intend to buy 100% of the stocks in Södra Cell Folla AS and restart the factory as soon as possible during 1st quarter of 2013.
