= Sela, Trøndelag =

Village in Steinkjer Municipality, Norway

Sela
- Village
- Interactive map of Sela
- Location within Trøndelag Location within Norway
- Coordinates: 64.0100°N 10.7970°E
- Country: Norway
- Region: Central Norway
- County: Trøndelag
- District: Innherred
- Municipality: Steinkjer Municipality
- Elevation: 277 m (909 ft)
- Time zone: UTC+01:00 (CET)
  - Summer (DST): UTC+02:00 (CEST)
- Post Code: 7796 Follafoss

Sela is a village located in Steinkjer Municipality in Trøndelag county, Norway. It is located in the rural mountain area in the west-central part of Steinkjer Municipality, close to the border with Åfjord Municipality. The village sits along the shore of the lake Selavatnet, about 22 kilometres (14 mi) northwest of the village of Follafoss and about 29 kilometres (18 mi) west of the village of Malm. The village is the location of Sela Church.
