= Malm Municipality =

Former municipality in Trøndelag, Norway

Malm Municipality Malm herad
- Former municipality
- Malme herred (historic name)
- Nord-Trøndelag within Norway

- Malm within Nord-Trøndelag
- Coordinates: 64.0753°N 11.2240°E
- Country: Norway
- County: Nord-Trøndelag
- District: Innherred
- Established: 1 July 1913
  - Preceded by: Beitstad Municipality
- Disestablished: 1 Jan 1964
  - Succeeded by: Verran Municipality
- Administrative centre: Malm

Government
  - Mayor (1949-1964): Olav Stavrum (Ap)

Area (upon dissolution)
  - Total: 260.99 km^{2} (100.77 sq mi)
  - Rank: #312 in Norway
- Highest elevation: 655.2 m (2,150 ft)

Population (1963)
  - Total: 2,986
  - Rank: #308 in Norway
  - Density: 11.4/km^{2} (30/sq mi)
  - Change (10 years): ▲ +16.4%
- Demonym: Malmbygg

Official language
  - Norwegian form: Nynorsk
- Time zone: UTC+01:00 (CET)
  - Summer (DST): UTC+02:00 (CEST)
- ISO 3166 code: NO-1726

Malm is a former municipality in the old Nord-Trøndelag county, Norway. The 261-square-kilometre (101 sq mi) municipality existed from 1913 until its dissolution in 1964. The municipality included a portion of what is now Steinkjer Municipality in Trøndelag county. The administrative centre was the village of Malm where Malm Church is located.

Prior to its dissolution in 1963, the 261-square-kilometre (101 sq mi) municipality was the 312th largest by area out of the 689 municipalities in Norway. Malm Municipality was the 308th most populous municipality in Norway with a population of about 2,986. The municipality's population density was 11.4 inhabitants per square kilometre (30/sq mi) and its population had increased by 16.4% over the previous 10-year period.

== General information ==
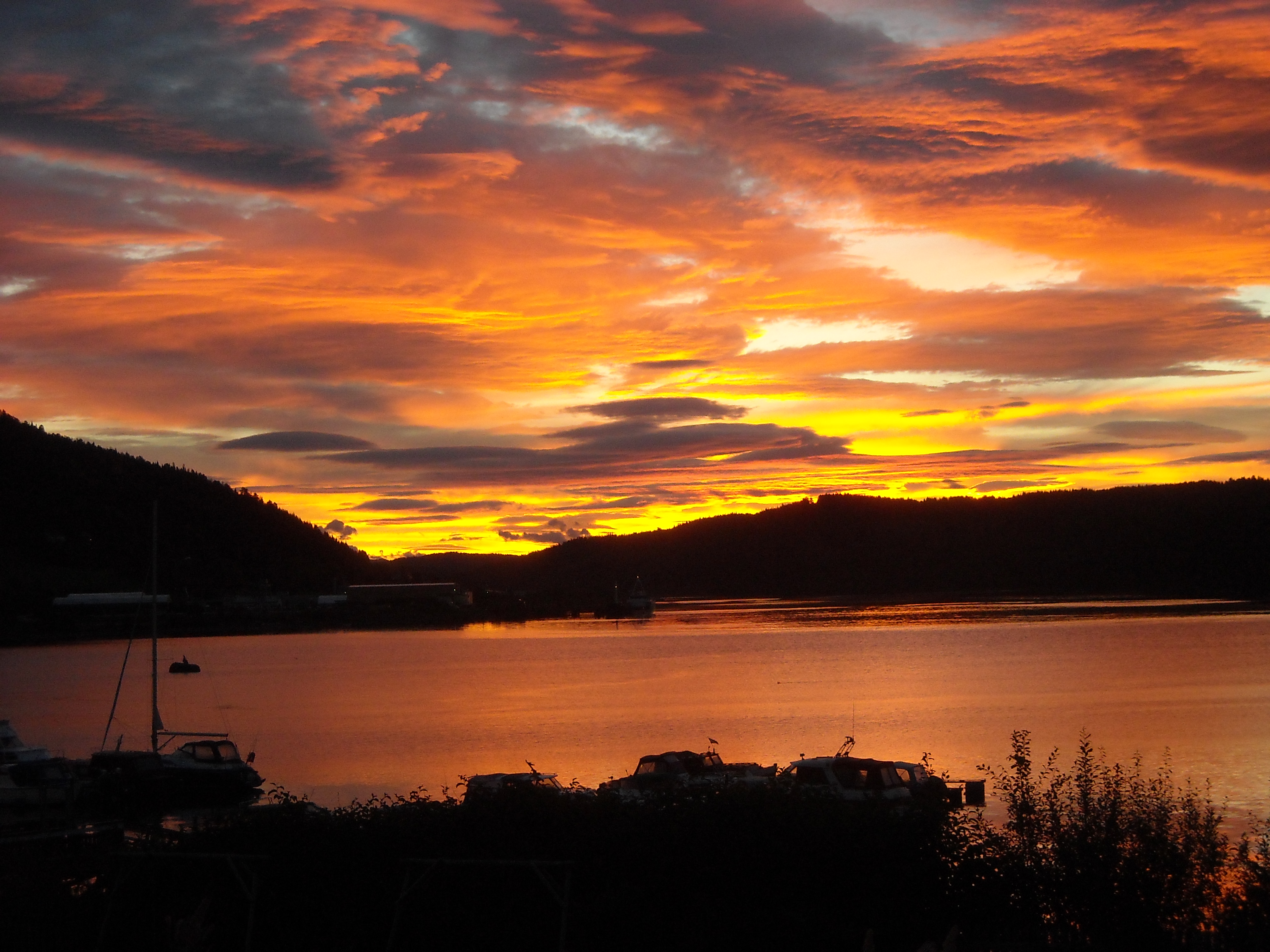
View of the Tjuin area of Malm

The municipality was established on 1 July 1913 when the western district of Beitstad Municipality was separated to form the new Malm Municipality. The initial population of Malm was 993 people, which left Beitstad Municipality with 1,934. During the 1960s, there were many municipal mergers across Norway due to the work of the Schei Committee. On 1 January 1964, Malm Municipality (population: 2,975) was merged with the neighboring Verran Municipality (population: 1,803), creating a new, larger Verran Municipality.

=== Name ===
The municipality (originally the parish) is named after the old Malm farm (Old Norse: Malmar) since the first Malm Church was built there. The name is the plural form of malmr which means "ore", likely referring to a gravelly plain or iron ore. Historically, the name of the municipality was spelled Malme. On 18 September 1914, a royal resolution changed the spelling of the name of the municipality to Malm.

=== Churches ===
The Church of Norway had one parish (sokn) within Malm Municipality. At the time of the municipal dissolution, it was part of the Beitstad prestegjeld and the Nord-Innherad prosti (deanery) in the Diocese of Nidaros.

Churches in Malm Municipality
| Parish (sokn) | Church name | Location of the church | Year built |
|---|---|---|---|
| Malm | Malm Church | Malm | 1885 |

== Geography ==
Malm Municipality was located a little to the west of the town of Steinkjer. It was surrounded by Namdalseid Municipality to the north, Beitstad Municipality to the east, the Beitstadfjorden and Verran Municipality to the south, and Åfjord Municipality to the west. The highest point in the municipality was the 655.2-metre (2,150 ft) tall mountain Sandvassheia on the border with Verran Municipality.

== Government ==
While it existed, Malm Municipality was responsible for primary education (through 10th grade), outpatient health services, senior citizen services, welfare and other social services, zoning, economic development, and municipal roads and utilities. The municipality was governed by a municipal council of directly elected representatives. The mayor was indirectly elected by a vote of the municipal council. The municipality was under the jurisdiction of the Frostating Court of Appeal.

=== Municipal council ===
The municipal council (Herredsstyre) of Malm Municipality was made up of 13 representatives that were elected to four year terms. The tables below show the historical composition of the council by political party.

Malm heradsstyre 1959–1963
| Party name (in Nynorsk) | Number of representatives |
|---|---|
| Labour Party (Arbeidarpartiet) | 8 |
| Communist Party (Kommunistiske Parti) | 2 |
| Centre Party (Senterpartiet) | 1 |
| Liberal Party (Venstre) | 2 |
| Total number of members: | 13 |

Malm heradsstyre 1955–1959
| Party name (in Nynorsk) | Number of representatives |
|---|---|
| Labour Party (Arbeidarpartiet) | 10 |
| Communist Party (Kommunistiske Parti) | 1 |
| Joint List(s) of Non-Socialist Parties (Borgarlege Felleslister) | 2 |
| Total number of members: | 13 |

Malm heradsstyre 1951–1955
| Party name (in Nynorsk) | Number of representatives |
|---|---|
| Labour Party (Arbeidarpartiet) | 8 |
| Communist Party (Kommunistiske Parti) | 1 |
| Joint List(s) of Non-Socialist Parties (Borgarlege Felleslister) | 3 |
| Total number of members: | 12 |

Malm heradsstyre 1947–1951
| Party name (in Nynorsk) | Number of representatives |
|---|---|
| Labour Party (Arbeidarpartiet) | 6 |
| Communist Party (Kommunistiske Parti) | 1 |
| Joint List(s) of Non-Socialist Parties (Borgarlege Felleslister) | 5 |
| Total number of members: | 12 |

Malm heradsstyre 1945–1947
| Party name (in Nynorsk) | Number of representatives |
|---|---|
| Labour Party (Arbeidarpartiet) | 6 |
| Communist Party (Kommunistiske Parti) | 3 |
| Joint List(s) of Non-Socialist Parties (Borgarlege Felleslister) | 3 |
| Total number of members: | 12 |

Malm heradsstyre 1937–1941*
| Party name (in Nynorsk) | Number of representatives |
|---|---|
| Labour Party (Arbeidarpartiet) | 8 |
| Joint List(s) of Non-Socialist Parties (Borgarlege Felleslister) | 4 |
| Total number of members: | 12 |
Note: Due to the German occupation of Norway during World War II, no elections were held for new municipal councils until after the war ended in 1945.

=== Mayors ===
The mayor (Nynorsk: ordførar) of Malm Municipality was the political leader of the municipality and the chairperson of the municipal council. Here is a list of people who held this position:

- 1913–1919: Karl Ertsaas (V)
- 1920–1925: Karl Larsen (Ap)
- 1926–1928: Martin Landsem (Bp)
- 1929–1931: Ole Kristian Olsen (Ap)
- 1932–1934: Martin Landsem (Bp)
- 1935–1940: Ole Kristian Olsen (Ap)
- 1940–1945: Martin Landsem (NS)
- 1945–1948: Ole Kristian Olsen (Ap)
- 1949–1964: Olav Stavrum (Ap)

== See also ==
- List of former municipalities of Norway
