= Bartnes Church =

Church in Trøndelag, Norway

- Bartnes kirke
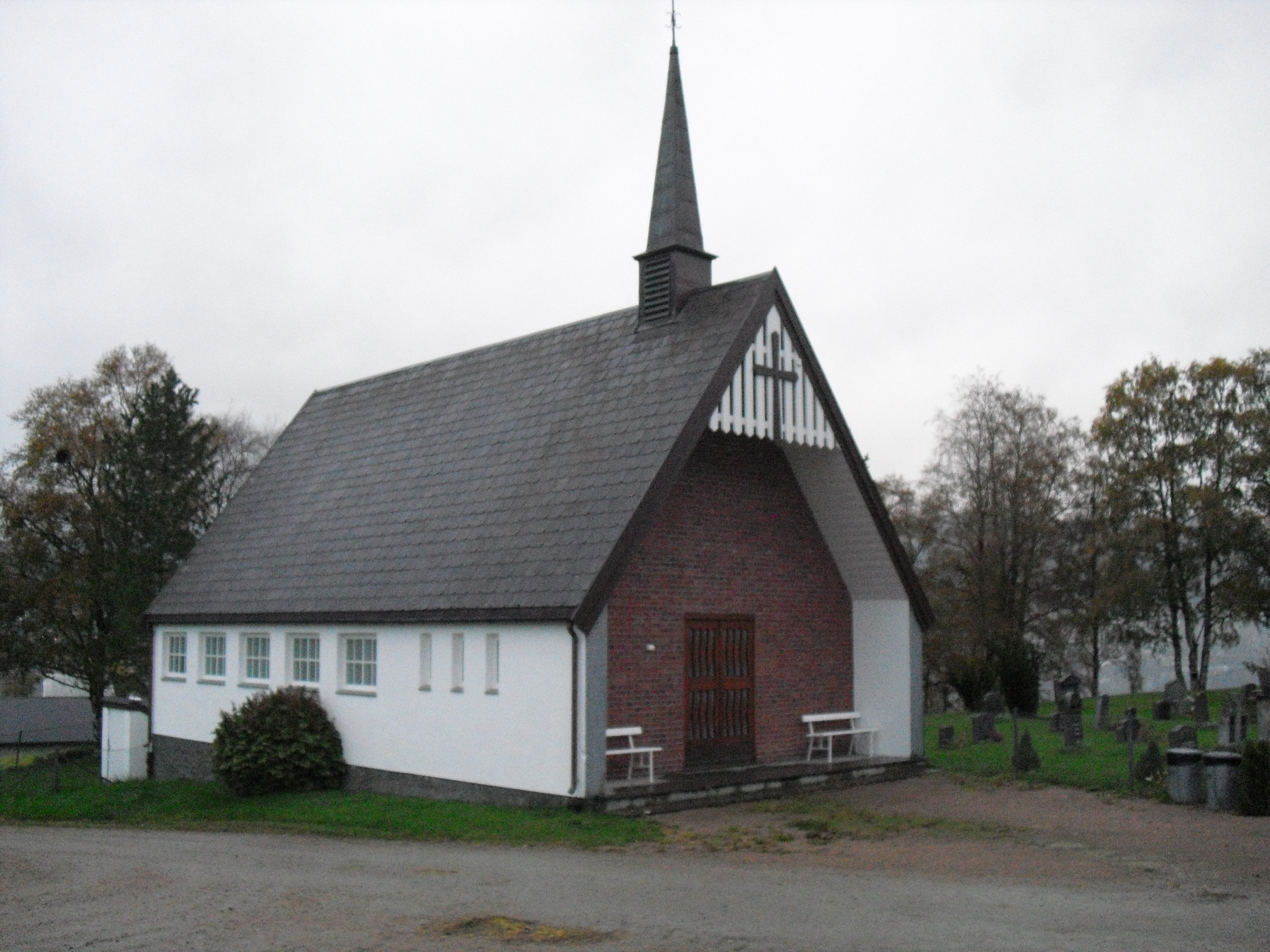
- View of the church
- Bartnes Church
- 64.057449337°N 11.242280065°E
- Location: Steinkjer Municipality, Trøndelag
- Country: Norway
- Denomination: Church of Norway
- Churchmanship: Evangelical Lutheran

History
- Status: Chapel
- Founded: 1960
- Consecrated: 31 July 1960

Architecture
- Functional status: Active
- Architect: John Aasum
- Architectural type: Long church
- Completed: 1960 (66 years ago)

Specifications
- Capacity: 100
- Materials: Brick

Administration
- Diocese: Nidaros bispedømme
- Deanery: Stiklestad prosti
- Parish: Beitstad
- Norwegian Cultural Heritage Site
- Type: Church
- Status: Not protected
- ID: 83854

Bartnes Church (Norwegian: Bartnes kirke) is a chapel of the Church of Norway in Steinkjer Municipality in Trøndelag county, Norway. It is located in the village of Bartnes. It is an annex chapel for the Beitstad parish which is part of the Stiklestad prosti (deanery) in the Diocese of Nidaros. The white and red, brick church was built in a long church style in 1960 using plans drawn up by the architect John Aasum. The church seats about 100 people.

== History ==
The first church in Bartnes was built around the year 1660 when the old Malm Church was relocated across the fjord to Bartnes. In the mid-1800s, the church was taken down and moved back across the fjord, but the cemetery that surrounded it remained. Over a century later, the parish chose to build a chapel just south of the cemetery. The new chapel was consecrated on 31 July 1960 by the bishop Arne Fjellbu.

== See also ==
- List of churches in Nidaros
