= Holden (Steinkjer) =

Lake in Trøndelag, Norway

- Interactive map of the lake
- Location: Steinkjer Municipality, Trøndelag
- Coordinates: 64.0739°N 10.9445°E
- Primary inflows: Torselva river
- Primary outflows: Stokkvedelva river
- Catchment area: Follaelva
- Basin countries: Norway
- Max. length: 8.5 kilometres (5.3 mi)
- Max. width: 5 kilometres (3.1 mi)
- Surface area: 13.31 km^{2} (5.14 sq mi)
- Shore length^{1}: 48.13 kilometres (29.91 mi)
- Surface elevation: 301 metres (988 ft)
- References: NVE
- ^{1} Shore length is not a well-defined measure.

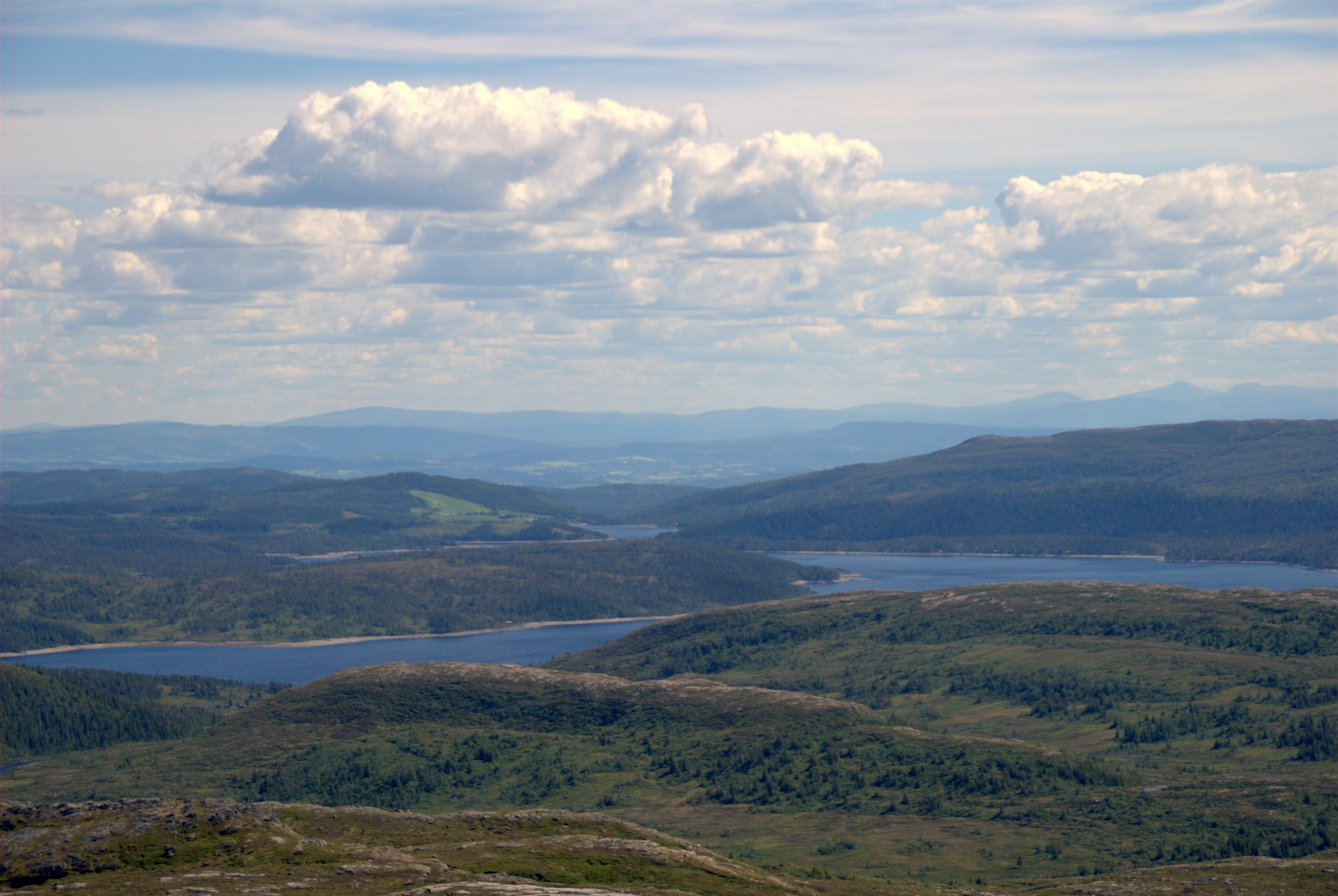
Holden, as seen from Finnvollheia

Holden is a lake in Steinkjer Municipality in Trøndelag county, Norway. It is located about 8 kilometres (5.0 mi) west of the village of Malm and about 10 kilometres (6.2 mi) north of the village of Follafoss. The 13.31-square-kilometre (5.14 sq mi) lake has a dam on the southern end to control the water for hydroelectric power. The lake flows out into the Follaelva river which flows into the Trondheimsfjord at the village of Follafoss.

== See also ==
- List of lakes in Norway
