= Knut Guttormsen =

Norwegian builder and architect

- Born: 1830; Morgedal, Norway
- Died: 1900 (aged 69–70); Trondheim, Norway
- Occupation: Architect
- Spouse: Sara Sofie Andersdtter Haugaskjæret

Knut Guttormsen (1830–1900) was a Norwegian builder and architect. He is most famous for the many churches he built and renovated.

Knut Guttormsen was married to Sara Sofie Andersdtter Haugaskjæret and together they had five children: Sofus Emil Guttormsen, Richard Gotfred Guttormsen, Olav Guttormsen, Karl Guttormsen, and Olaf Marinius Guttormsen.

Knut Guttormsen was born on the homestead Sigurdstøyl in Morgedal in Telemark county. He was confirmed at the Kviteseid Church in 1845. The same year he traveled to Christiania where an older half-brother had settled earlier. He became a stonemason, bricklayer, and builder. He helped build a bridge over Sarpsfossen in Sarpsborg. While in Sarpsborg, he met Sofie Andersdatter Haugaskjæret from Time in Østfold. For a time he also did work on the Gamle Aker Church.

The family moved to Trondheim in the 1860s where he received several large construction assignments. Eventually, Knut Guttormsen was appointed construction manager for the restoration work at Nidaros Cathedral. He also did work on many churches including Åfjord Church, Rissa Church, Melhus Church, and Ytterøy Church.
