= Verrastranda =

Village in Steinkjer Municipality, Norway

- Village
- Interactive map of Verrastranda
- Location within Trøndelag Location within Norway
- Coordinates: 63.9036°N 10.9119°E
- Country: Norway
- Region: Central Norway
- County: Trøndelag
- District: Innherred
- Municipality: Steinkjer Municipality
- Elevation: 41 m (135 ft)
- Time zone: UTC+01:00 (CET)
  - Summer (DST): UTC+02:00 (CEST)
- Post Code: 7796 Follafoss

Verrastranda is a village located in Steinkjer Municipality in Trøndelag county, Norway. It is located on the north shore of the Verrasundet arm of the Trondheimsfjord. The village of Verrabotn (in Indre Fosen Municipality) lies about 20 kilometres (12 mi) to the southwest and the village of Follafoss lies about 15 kilometres (9.3 mi) to the northeast. Norwegian National Road 720 runs through the village. Verrastranda has a primary school.

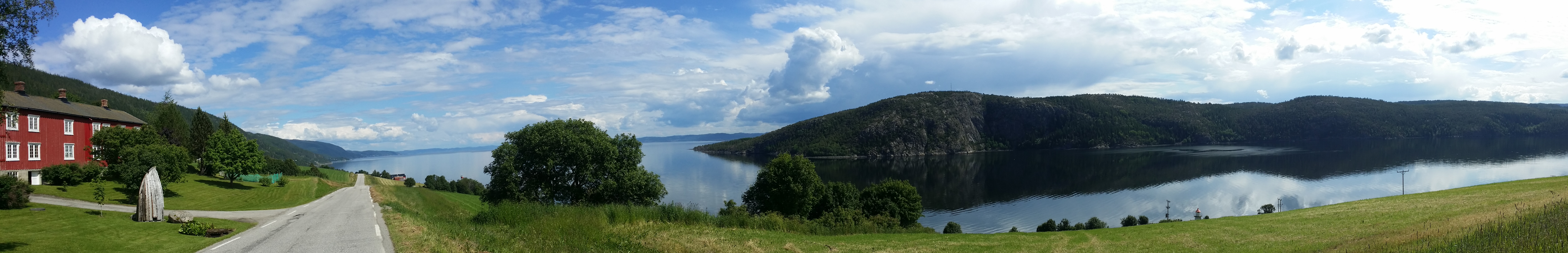
View from Verrastranda, looking across the fjord towards Ramsberget mountain

== Notable people ==
- André N. Skjelstad, a former member of the Norwegian Parliament grew up in Verrastranda
