= Selavatnet =

Lake in Trøndelag, Norway

Selavatnet Straumsetervatnet
- Interactive map of the lake
- Location: Trøndelag, Norway
- Coordinates: 63.9814°N 10.8804°E
- Primary inflows: Gurbelva river
- Primary outflows: Tverråa river
- Catchment area: Follaelva
- Basin countries: Norway
- Max. length: 8 kilometres (5.0 mi)
- Max. width: 2.5 kilometres (1.6 mi)
- Surface area: 4.72 km^{2} (1.82 sq mi)
- Shore length^{1}: 31.68 kilometres (19.69 mi)
- Surface elevation: 260 metres (850 ft)
- References: NVE
- ^{1} Shore length is not a well-defined measure.

Selavatnet is a lake on the border of Åfjord Municipality and Steinkjer Municipality in Trøndelag county, Norway. The majority of the 4.72-square-kilometre (1.82 sq mi) lake lies in Steinkjer Municipality, with the northwestern end of the lake partially lying in Åfjord Municipality. The village of Sela (and Sela Church) lies on the northern side of the lake and the village of Sandsetra at the southeastern end of the lake. The lake is one of the sources for the Folla river system which flows into the Trondheimsfjord at the village of Follafoss.

The main part of the lake is called Selavatnet, the southeastern end of the lake is known as Straumsetervatnet.

== See also ==
- List of lakes in Norway
