= Tørris Johnsen Worum =

Norwegian politician

Tørris Johnsen Worum (1784 – 4 May 1834) was a Norwegian politician.

He worked as a farmer in Nord-Trøndelag. He was elected to the Norwegian Parliament in 1824, representing the constituency of Nordre Throndhjems Amt (now Nord-Trøndelag). He served only one term. His son Johannes Tørrissen Worum (1817-1889) later served in the Norwegian Parliament from the same district.
