= Fines Church =

Church in Trøndelag, Norway

- Fines kirke
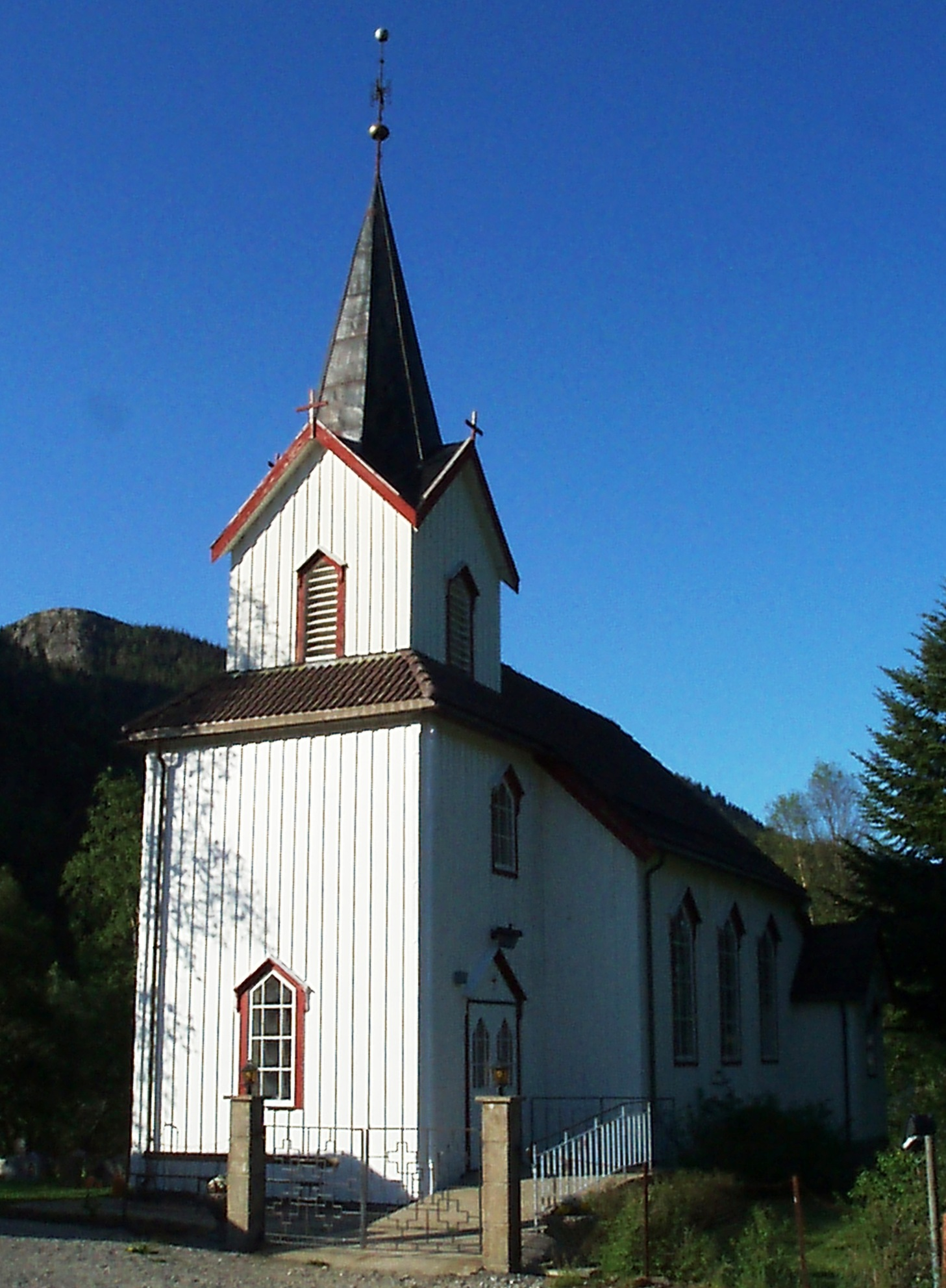
- View of the church
- Fines Church
- 63.80191791°N 10.581253409°E
- Location: Indre Fosen, Trøndelag
- Country: Norway
- Denomination: Church of Norway
- Churchmanship: Evangelical Lutheran

History
- Status: Parish church
- Founded: 1915
- Consecrated: 1915

Architecture
- Functional status: Active
- Architect: Ole Havnæs
- Architectural type: Long church
- Completed: 1915 (111 years ago)

Specifications
- Capacity: 136
- Materials: Wood

Administration
- Diocese: Nidaros bispedømme
- Deanery: Fosen prosti
- Parish: Rissa
- Norwegian Cultural Heritage Site
- Type: Church
- Status: Not protected
- ID: 84136

Fines Church (Norwegian: Fines kirke) is a parish church of the Church of Norway in Indre Fosen Municipality in Trøndelag county, Norway. It is located in the village of Verrabotn. It is one of the churches for the Rissa parish which is part of the Fosen prosti (deanery) in the Diocese of Nidaros. The white, wooden church was built in a long church style in 1915 using plans drawn up by the architect Ole Havnæs. The church seats about 136 people. The church has a pink interior.

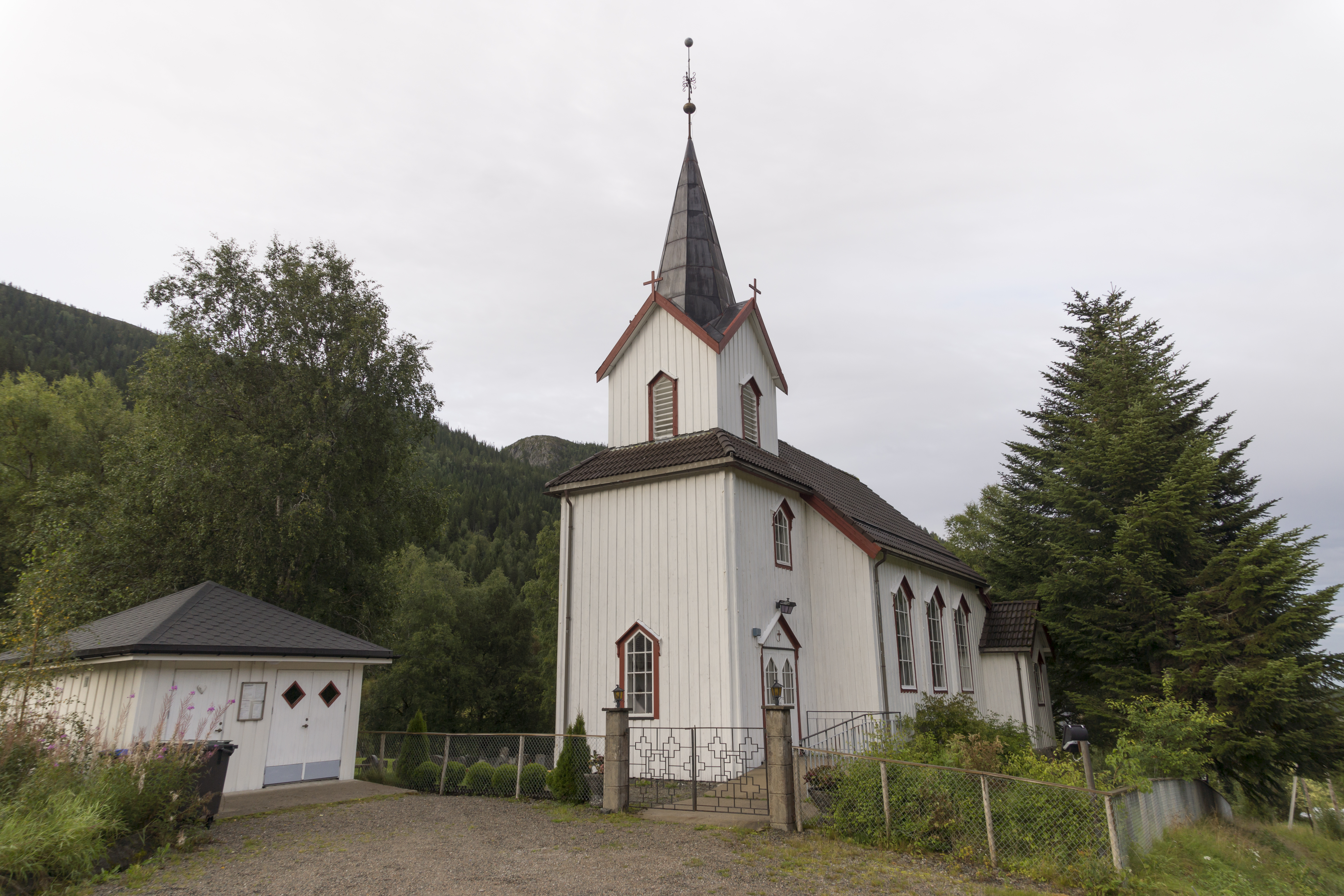
View of the church

Prior to 1 January 2020, the church was part of the Verran parish in what is now Sør-Innherad prosti. On that date, the Verrabotn area became part of Indre Fosen Municipality and therefore the church changed parishes and joined the Fosen prosti.

== See also ==
- List of churches in Nidaros
