= Bartnes, Trøndelag =

Village in Steinkjer Municipality, Norway

Bartnes
- Village
- Interactive map of Bartnes
- Location within Trøndelag Location within Norway
- Coordinates: 64.0582°N 11.2430°E
- Country: Norway
- Region: Central Norway
- County: Trøndelag
- District: Innherred
- Municipality: Steinkjer Municipality
- Elevation: 49 m (161 ft)
- Time zone: UTC+01:00 (CET)
  - Summer (DST): UTC+02:00 (CEST)
- Post Code: 7730 Beitstad

Bartnes is a village in Steinkjer Municipality in Trøndelag county, Norway. The village is located along the shore of the innermost part of the Trondheimsfjord, across from the large village of Malm and about 7 kilometres (4.3 mi) southwest of the village of Beitstad. The town of Steinkjer lies about 13 kilometres (8.1 mi) to the southeast and the village of Vellamelen lies about 10 kilometres (6.2 mi) northeast of Bartnes. Bartnes Church is located in this village. Bartnes is a very old settlement, with many historical findings in the surrounding area.
