= Hundhammerfjellet Wind Farm =

Wind farm in Nærøysund, Norway

Hundhammerfjellet
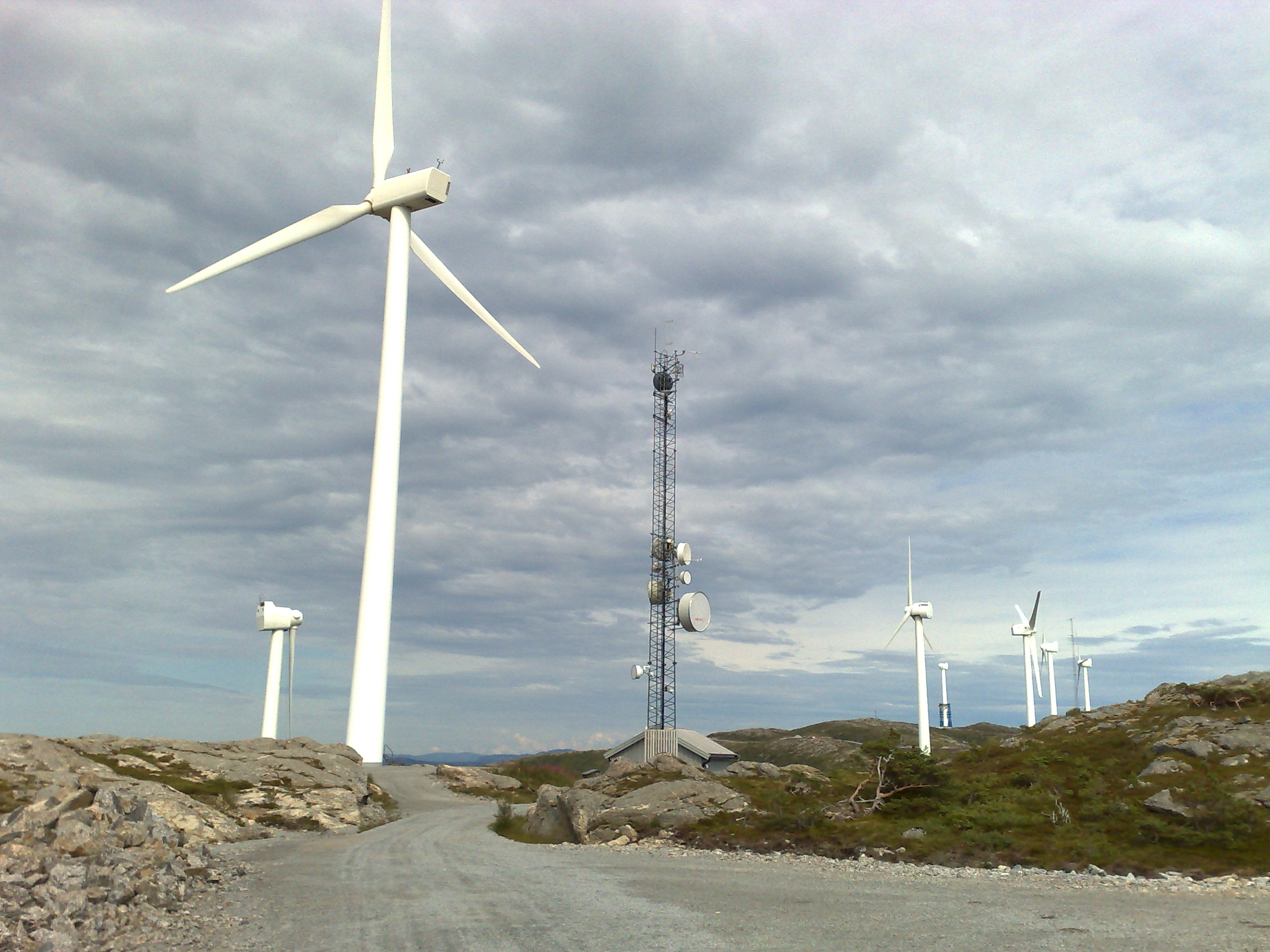
- Country: Norway
- Location: Nærøysund Municipality
- Coordinates: 64°45′39.43″N 11°23′9.44″E
- Status: Operational
- Commission date: December 2009
- Owner: Nord-Trøndelag Elektrisitetsverk

Power generation
- Units operational: 17
- Make and model: Scanwind; Vestas; Enercon
- Units decommissioned: 1
- Nameplate capacity: 54 MW
- Capacity factor: 33.8%
- Annual net output: 160 GW·h

Hundhammerfjellet Wind Farm is a wind farm located in Nærøysund Municipality, Norway. It has 17 windmills with output between 1.66 to 3.5 megawatts (2,230 to 4,690 hp), delivered from Norwegian manufacturer Scanwind (14 turbines, one more has been decommissioned), Vestas (one V66) and Enercon (one E-70 2.0 MW and one E-70 2.3 MW). The farm is owned by Nord-Trøndelag Elektrisitetsverk and has been completed in December 2009 with the installation of the ENERCON E-70 2.3 MW.
