= Sela Church =

Church in Trøndelag, Norway

- Sela fjellkirke
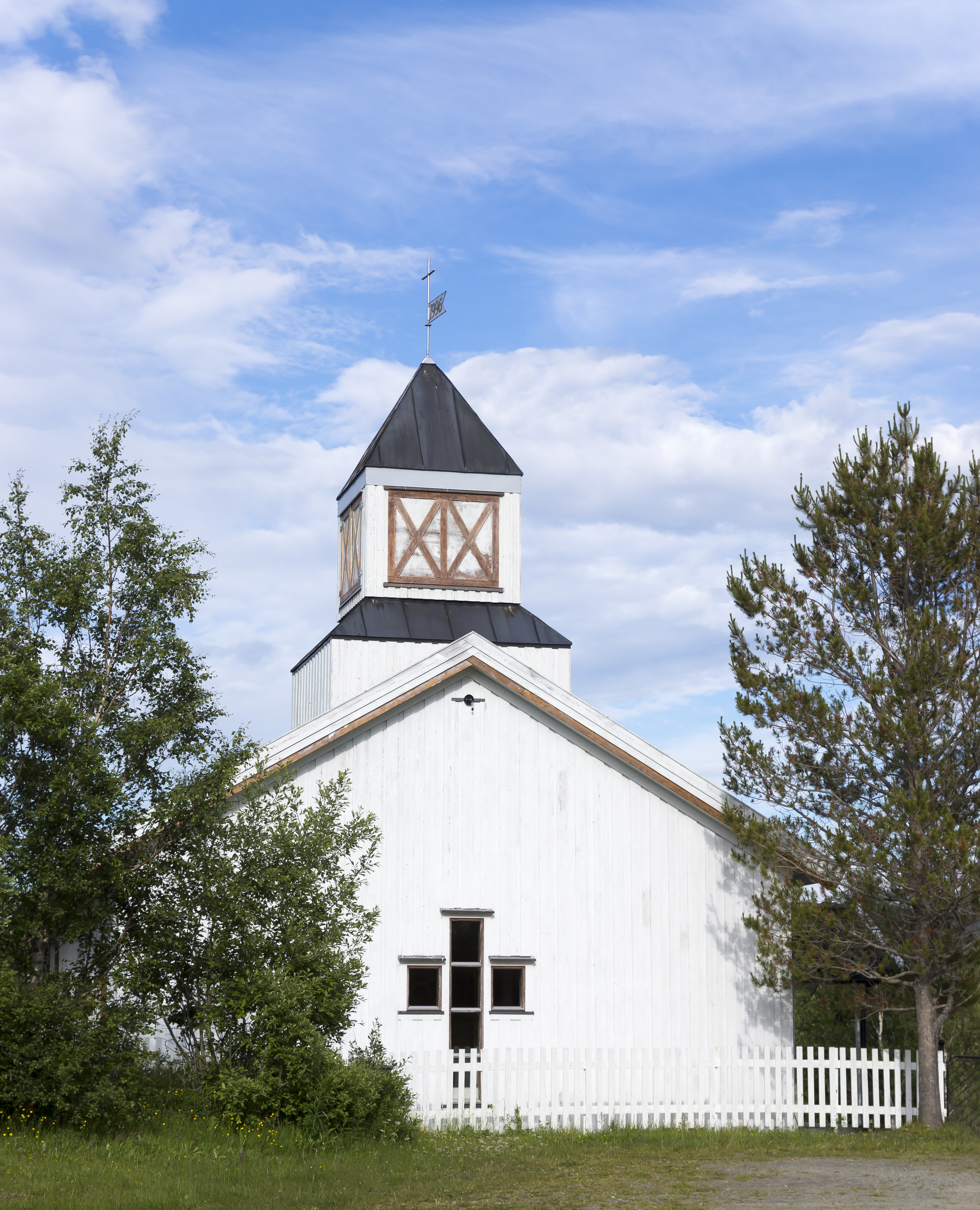
- View of the chapel
- Sela Church
- 64.0062698°N 10.79465076°E
- Location: Steinkjer Municipality, Trøndelag
- Country: Norway
- Denomination: Church of Norway
- Churchmanship: Evangelical Lutheran

History
- Status: Chapel
- Founded: 1895
- Consecrated: 28 Sept 1997

Architecture
- Functional status: Active
- Architectural type: Long church
- Completed: 1997 (29 years ago)

Specifications
- Capacity: 120
- Materials: Wood

Administration
- Diocese: Nidaros bispedømme
- Deanery: Stiklestad prosti
- Parish: Malm
- Norwegian Cultural Heritage Site
- Type: Church
- Status: Not protected
- ID: 85414

Sela Church (Norwegian: Sela fjellkirke) is a chapel of the Church of Norway in Steinkjer Municipality in Trøndelag county, Norway. It is located in the village of Sela. It is an annex chapel for the Malm parish which is part of the Stiklestad prosti (deanery) in the Diocese of Nidaros. The white, wooden church was built in a long church style in 1997. The church seats about 120 people.

== History ==
The first chapel in Sela was built in 1895. The chapel was built by Petter Estensen. The villagers financed the building and the teacher Anton Granhus made the drawings for the local builders. The church was 15 metres (49 ft) long, with a low spire. It was built to seat about 100 people. On 26 October 1895, a royal resolution granted permission to consecrate the small chapel that the local residents had built. It was consecrated on 15 July 1896 by Bishop Johannes Skaar. A plot of land by the church was also consecrated as a burial ground. The church officials decided that four services a year should be held at the chapel: two by the parish priest from Beitstad Church, one by the parish priest from Ytterøy Church, and one by the parish priest in Åfjord Church. The church was not well-made and so by the 1930s, the church was in poor condition. It was torn down in 1937.

The second chapel on this site was built in 1937 right after the previous building was torn down. The new building was consecrated on 21 September 1937 by Bishop Johan Nicolai Støren. The chapel was designed by Roar Tønseth. It was a log building with a turf roof and a cross on the roof. In 1955, after only 28 years in use, the building was condemned due to rot and fungal infestation. The building was demolished and burned. The local schoolhouse in Kruven was used to hold church services after that time, but there were no immediate plans to replace the building.

Finally, after many years without a chapel building, a new chapel was built in 1997. It was consecrated on 28 September 1997 by the Bishop Finn Wagle. This church was built near where the old Selahaugen church used to stand until the 1955.

== See also ==
- List of churches in Nidaros
