= Follafoss Church =

Church in Trøndelag, Norway

- Follafoss kirke
- Foldafoss kirke
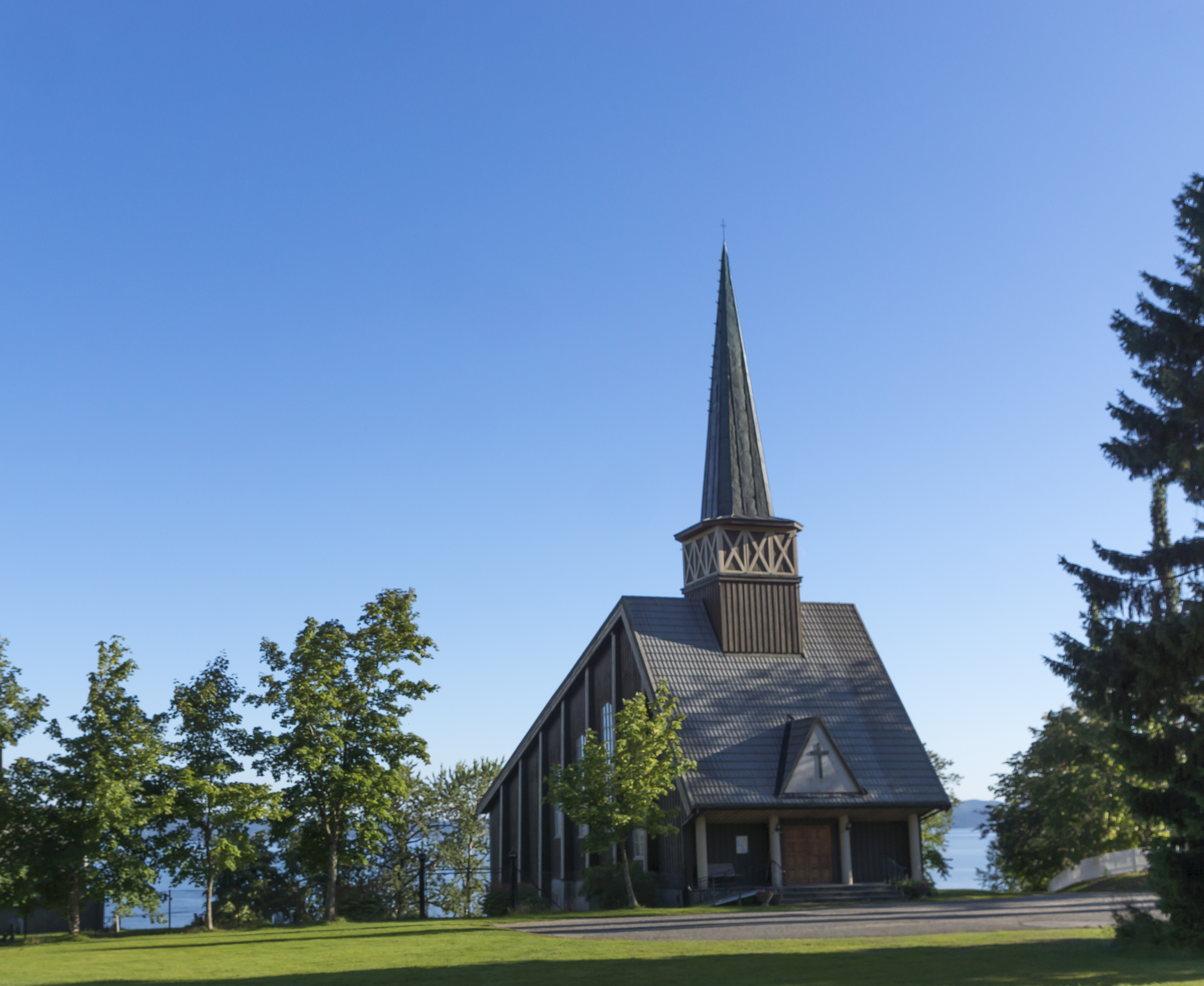
- View of the church
- Follafoss Church
- 63.98544807°N 11.113651514°E
- Location: Steinkjer Municipality, Trøndelag
- Country: Norway
- Denomination: Church of Norway
- Churchmanship: Evangelical Lutheran

History
- Status: Parish church
- Founded: 1954
- Consecrated: 1954

Architecture
- Functional status: Active
- Architect: Sverre Olsen
- Architectural type: Long church
- Completed: 1954 (72 years ago)

Specifications
- Capacity: 200
- Materials: Wood

Administration
- Diocese: Nidaros bispedømme
- Deanery: Stiklestad prosti
- Parish: Verran
- Norwegian Cultural Heritage Site
- Type: Church
- Status: Not protected
- ID: 84173

Follafoss Church (Norwegian: Follafoss kirke) is a parish church of the Church of Norway in the Steinkjer Municipality in Trøndelag county, Norway. It is located in the village of Follafoss. It is the church for the Verran parish, which is part of the Stiklestad prosti (deanery) in the Diocese of Nidaros. The brown, wooden church was built in a long church style in 1954 using plans drawn up by the architect Sverre Olsen. The church seats about 200 people. It has a somewhat non-traditional roof line and design due to being built on the side of a hill.

== See also ==
- List of churches in Nidaros
