= Erik Tørrissen =

Norwegian politician (born 1988)

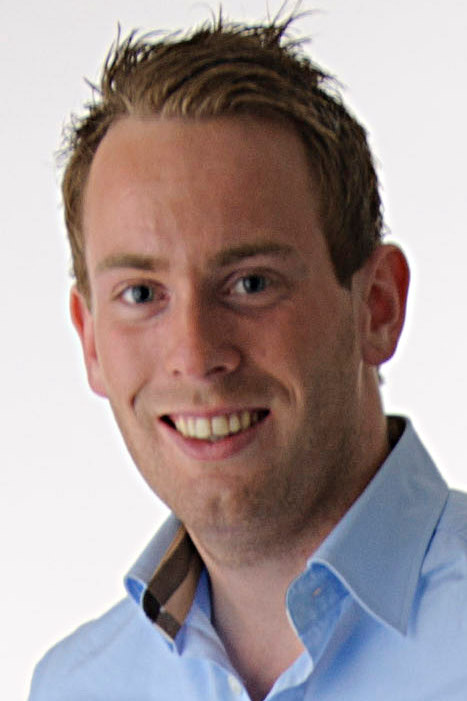
Erik Tørrissen (2011)

Erik Tørrissen (born February 10, 1988, in Ålesund, Møre og Romsdal) is a Norwegian yachtsman and politician from the Progress Party. He was the Vice-chairman of the Progress Party's Youth from 2012 to 2014.

== Political career ==
After the 2015 local elections, Tørrissen was elected into the Bærum municipal council. During the 2011-2015 term he served as deputy member of the county council of Møre og Romsdal, and member of the municipal council of Ålesund Municipality where he was chairing the Scrutiny-committee. On the national convention of the Progress Party's Youth in 2012 he was elected vice-chairman, after having served a variety of positions previously including election campaign manager. Prior to the 2014 National Convention he announced that he would not seek re-election as he was entering a position as Communications Adviser for the Progress Party's Parliamentary Group.

He previously held an internship with the Confederation of Norwegian Enterprise. Tørrissen is currently serving as Communications Advisor for the Progress Party at the Storting.

=== Political views ===
A staunch liberal, Tørrissen advocates decreased government regulation as well as a drastic reduction on import taxes to avoid protectionism. In his opinion: Public schools should be neutral and not favour any particular religion. Working on Sundays should be legalised together with alcohol advertisements on television, which is currently illegal. He also wishes to abolish the government monopoly on alcoholic beverage retails through Vinmonopolet.

Tørrissen is a known supporter of a Norwegian membership in the European Union.

== Personal life ==
Tørrissen is currently studying law at the University of Oslo, and he holds a degree in Managerial economics from the BI Norwegian Business School. He lives in Fornebu in Bærum.

=== Sailing ===
Tørrissen is an avid yachtsman. In 2003 he represented Norway in the European Championship with his optimist, as well as the Nordic championship with his Europe class boat. Today, although retired from competing, he is certified by the Norwegian Sailing Association as both coach and sailing referee and has worked as a coach at his local sailing club in Ålesund.
