= Velle, Trøndelag =

Village in Steinkjer Municipality, Norway

Vellamelen Velde / Velle
- Village
- Interactive map of Vellamelen
- Location within Trøndelag Location within Norway
- Coordinates: 64.1110°N 11.3883°E
- Country: Norway
- Region: Central Norway
- County: Trøndelag
- District: Innherred
- Municipality: Steinkjer Municipality

Area
  - Total: 0.42 km^{2} (0.16 sq mi)
- Elevation: 5 m (16 ft)

Population (2024)
  - Total: 479
  - Density: 1,140/km^{2} (3,000/sq mi)
- Time zone: UTC+01:00 (CET)
  - Summer (DST): UTC+02:00 (CEST)
- Post Code: 7730 Beitstad

Vellamelen or Velle is a village in Steinkjer Municipality in Trøndelag county, Norway. The village sits at the end of one of the innermost parts of the Trondheimsfjord, west of the village of Følling and northeast of the villages of Beitstad and Bartnes. The village sits along Norwegian County Road 17 about 20 kilometres (12 mi) northwest of the town of Steinkjer.

The 0.42-square-kilometre (100-acre) village has a population (2024) of 479 and a population density of 1,140 inhabitants per square kilometre (3,000/sq mi).
