= Nord-Trøndelag Elektrisitetsverk =

Norwegian power company

Nord-Trøndelag Elektrisitetsverk – NTE
- Company type: Aksjeselskap
- Industry: Power
- Founded: 1923
- Headquarters: Steinkjer, Norway
- Area served: Nord-Trøndelag
- Key people: CEO/President: Christian Stav; Chairman of the Board of Directors: Bjørnar Skjevik
- Products: Electricity; Broadband; District heating
- Revenue: ▲NOK 1,809 million (2005)
- Operating income: NOK 694 million (2005)
- Number of employees: 950 (2006)
- Parent: Nord-Trøndelag County Municipality
- Website: http://www.nte.no http://timeline.nte.no

Nord-Trøndelag Elektrisitetsverk or NTE is a power company serving northern Trøndelag county in Norway and owned by the local governments of 19 municipalities that it serves. NTE is one of the largest producers of electricity in Norway, with an annual production of 3.4 terawatt-hours (12 PJ) per year (2013). In addition, the company is a provider of electrical installation and electrical application retailing as well as optic fiber broadband. The company has its headquarters in Steinkjer.

== Operations ==
=== Power production ===
NTE operates 22 hydroelectric power plants, two wind farms and one bioenergy plant, totaling an annual electricity production of 3.4 terawatt-hours (12 PJ), about 4% of the total electricity production in Norway. The hydro plants are mostly located in the Indre Namdal district plus Meråker Municipality, Inderøy Municipality and Steinkjer Municipality. NTE's largest plant is the one at Tunnsjødal with an annual production of 840 gigawatt-hours (3,000 TJ) per year. The bioplant is located in Inderøy Municipality while the two windmill parks are located at Hundhammerfjellet and Vikna.

=== Power distribution ===
NTE owns the power grid for all of northern Trøndelag county. Despite the market being deregulated so anyone can purchase from any supplier in the country, NTE has remained a market share of 96%. The ownership and operations of the power grid was transferred to the subsidiary NTE Nett AS in 2006.

=== Other operations ===
The company also construct a network of primarily optical fiber based broadband supplemented with ADSL to all households in Nord-Trøndelag though the subsidiary NTE Bredbånd AS.

== History ==
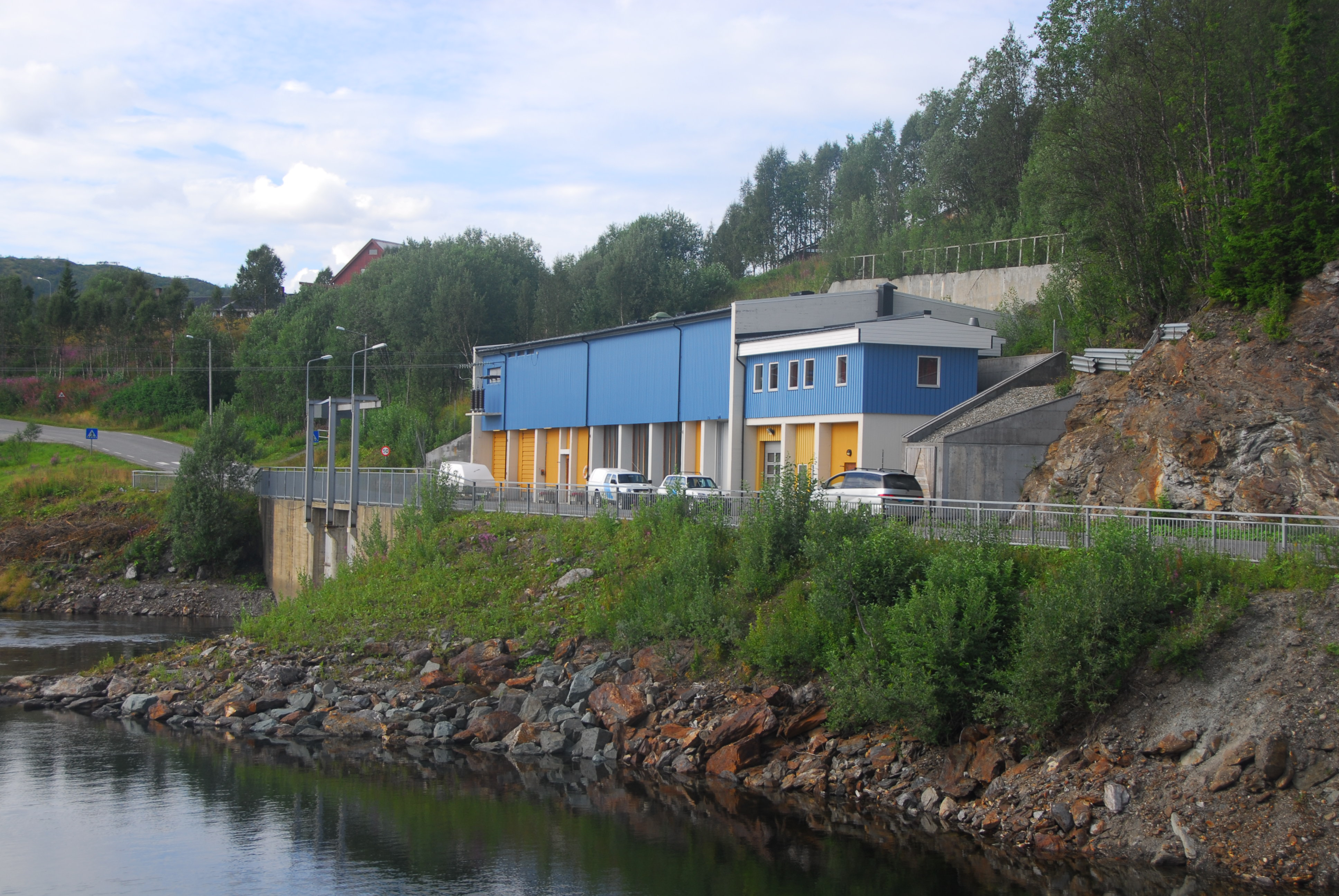
Røyrvikfoss Power Station in Røyrvik Municipality

On June 22, 1919, the County of Nord-Trøndelag decided to found NTE and build a hydroelectric power plant at Follafoss in Verran Municipality. In 1923, the power plant started operations. In 1938, NTE made its first acquisition of a municipal power company, Stod electrical works. NTE gradually took over the municipal companies until it owned all the companies by 1989. This was due to a national encouragement from the authorities to create larger, vertical integrated power companies, preferably owned by counties and not municipalities, through the 1970s and 80s. Nord-Trøndelag is the only county that managed to create a fully vertical integrated power company that controlled the entire power grid and all production facilities throughout the entire country, and was wholly owned by the county municipality. The last purchase was Statkrafts ownership in the powerplants in Indre Namdal in 2004. On 5 October 2009, NTE and Østfold Energi announced that they, through their 50–50% joint venture Norsk Vannkraftproduksjon had bought the power stations Siso and Laksola from Elkem for NOK 4.3 billion. The shares are distributed between 23 owner municipalities in 2018. In 2018, Nord-Trøndelag and Sør-Trøndelag counties merged to form Trøndelag county. At that time the old Nord-Trøndelag county sold the entire ownership of the company to the 19 municipalities in the old Nord-Trøndelag county.
