= Johannes Tørrissen Worum =

Norwegian politician

Johannes Tørrissen Worum (4 June 1817 – 20 December 1889) was a Norwegian politician.

He was born on Ytterøya in Nordre Trondheim county. His father was Tørris Johnsen Worum (1784-1836). He worked as a teacher and was elected to the Norwegian Parliament in 1854 and 1859, representing the constituency of Nordre Throndhjems Amt (now Nord-Trondelag).
