= Malm Church =

Church in Trøndelag, Norway

- Malm kirke
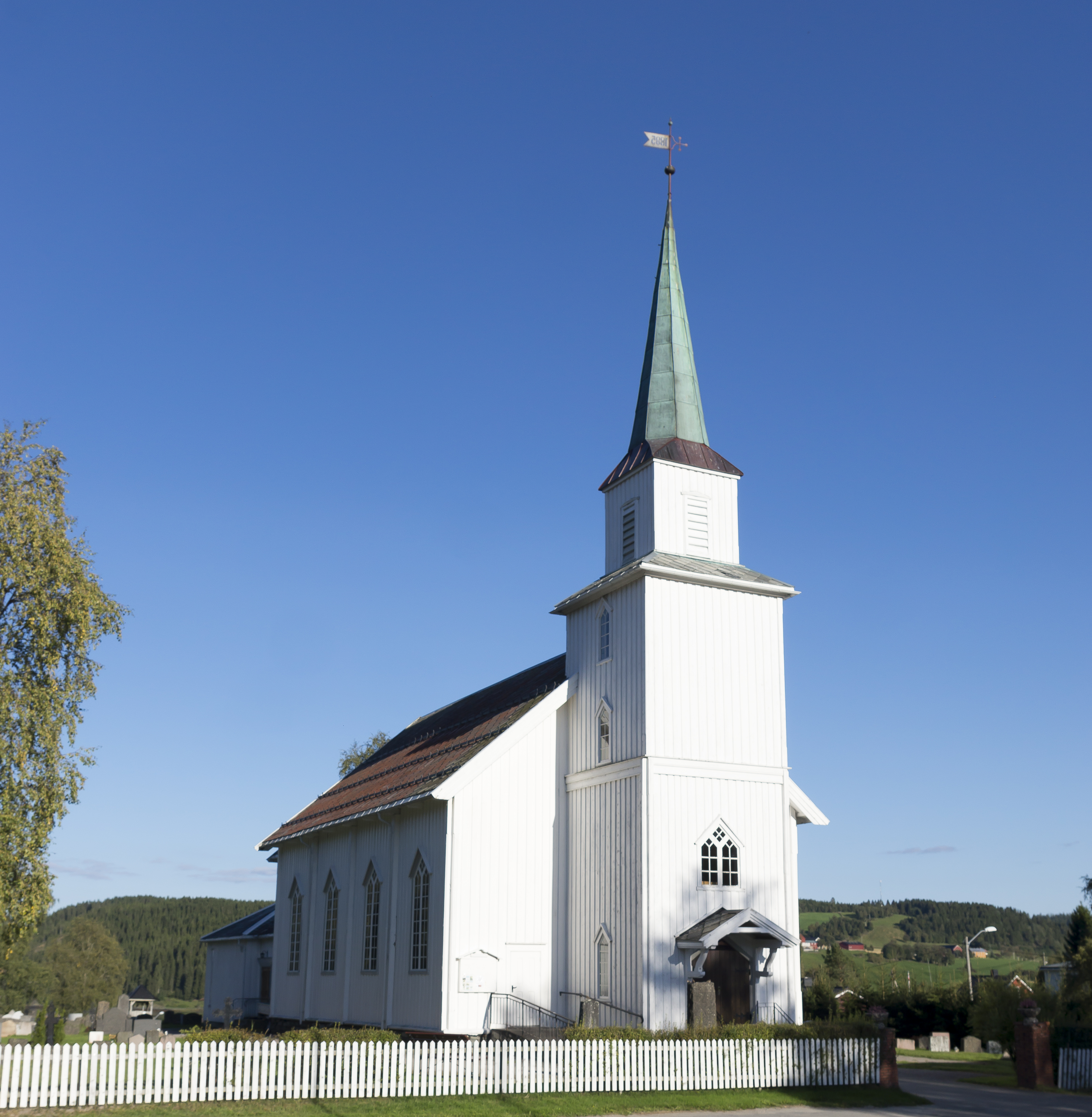
- View of the church
- Malm Church
- 64.069547715°N 11.218060791°E
- Location: Steinkjer Municipality, Trøndelag
- Country: Norway
- Denomination: Church of Norway
- Churchmanship: Evangelical Lutheran

History
- Former name: Reit kirke / Bartnes kirke
- Status: Parish church
- Founded: 15th century
- Consecrated: 17 Sept 1886

Architecture
- Functional status: Active
- Architect: Rasmus Overrein
- Architectural type: Long church
- Completed: 1886 (140 years ago)

Specifications
- Capacity: 350
- Materials: Wood

Administration
- Diocese: Nidaros bispedømme
- Deanery: Stiklestad prosti
- Parish: Malm
- Norwegian Cultural Heritage Site
- Type: Church
- Status: Listed
- ID: 84380

Malm Church (Norwegian: Malm kirke) is a parish church of the Church of Norway in Steinkjer Municipality in Trøndelag county, Norway. It is located in the village of Malm. It is the main church for the Malm parish which is part of the Stiklestad prosti (deanery) in the Diocese of Nidaros. The white, wooden church was built in a long church style in 1886 using plans drawn up by the architect Rasmus Overrein. The church seats about 350 people.

== History ==
The earliest existing historical records of the church date back to the year 1533, but the church was not new that year. The first church for Malm was a stave church located at Reit, about 2 kilometres (1.2 mi) south of the present-day church site and it was built possibly during the 15th century. The church stood at Reit for centuries and then by the mid-1600s, the church was in poor condition so it was decided to build a new church. In 1660, a new wooden church was built at Bartnes, the 2nd largest farm in the whole parish. Bartnes is located about 1.5 kilometres (0.93 mi) east of the old church site, on the opposite site of the Beitstadsundet strait. The old church was not torn down right away, but for some time it was maintained as a burial chapel. Eventually it was taken down.

The new church at Bartnes was not well maintained. In 1722, the fairly new church was renovated completely. In 1850, it was again decided to move the church. This time the church would be moved to the village of Malm (on the west side of the strait). In the fall and winter of 1850, the building was disassembled, transported across the ice on the strait, and rebuilt in the village of Malm. It was put back in to use in 1851. The cemetery that surrounded the old Bartnes church remained in use as an auxiliary cemetery (and many years later a new Bartnes Church was built on that site once again).

After moving the church to Malm, the building was soon found to be too small for the congregation. A new long church was built beside the old one and it was completed in 1886. It was designed by Rasmus Overrein using the same design that was used on the nearby Kvam Church. The last worship service in the old church was on 22 August 1886. The new church was consecrated on 17 September 1886 by the Bishop Niels Laache. Afterwards, the old church was disassembled (again) and sold to a parish in Helgeland where it was rebuilt as Skålvær Church. In 1956, the church was expanded. A new church hall was added on the eastern end of the building and a basement was dug under the sacristy that houses a kitchen and bathrooms.

== Media gallery ==
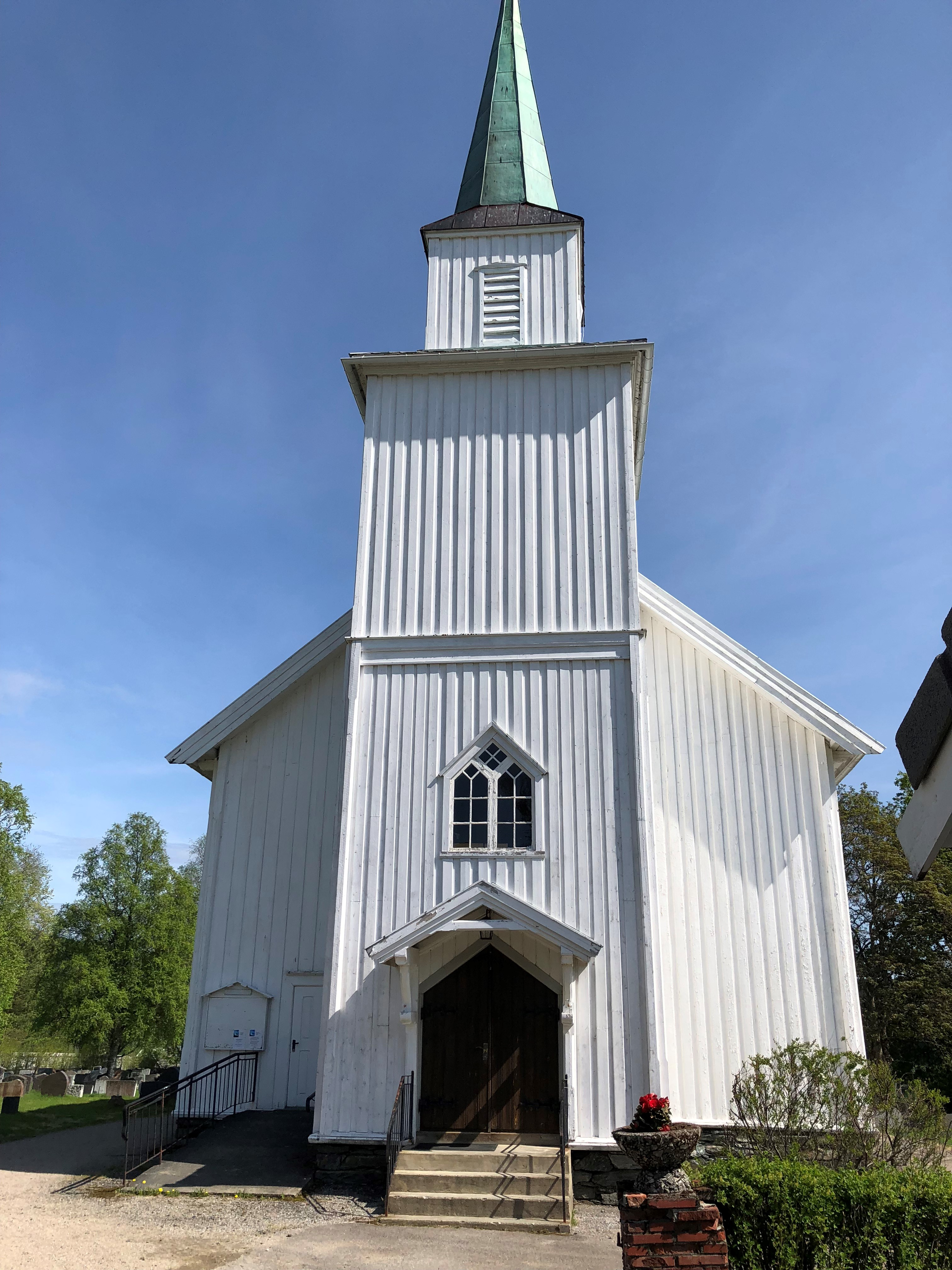

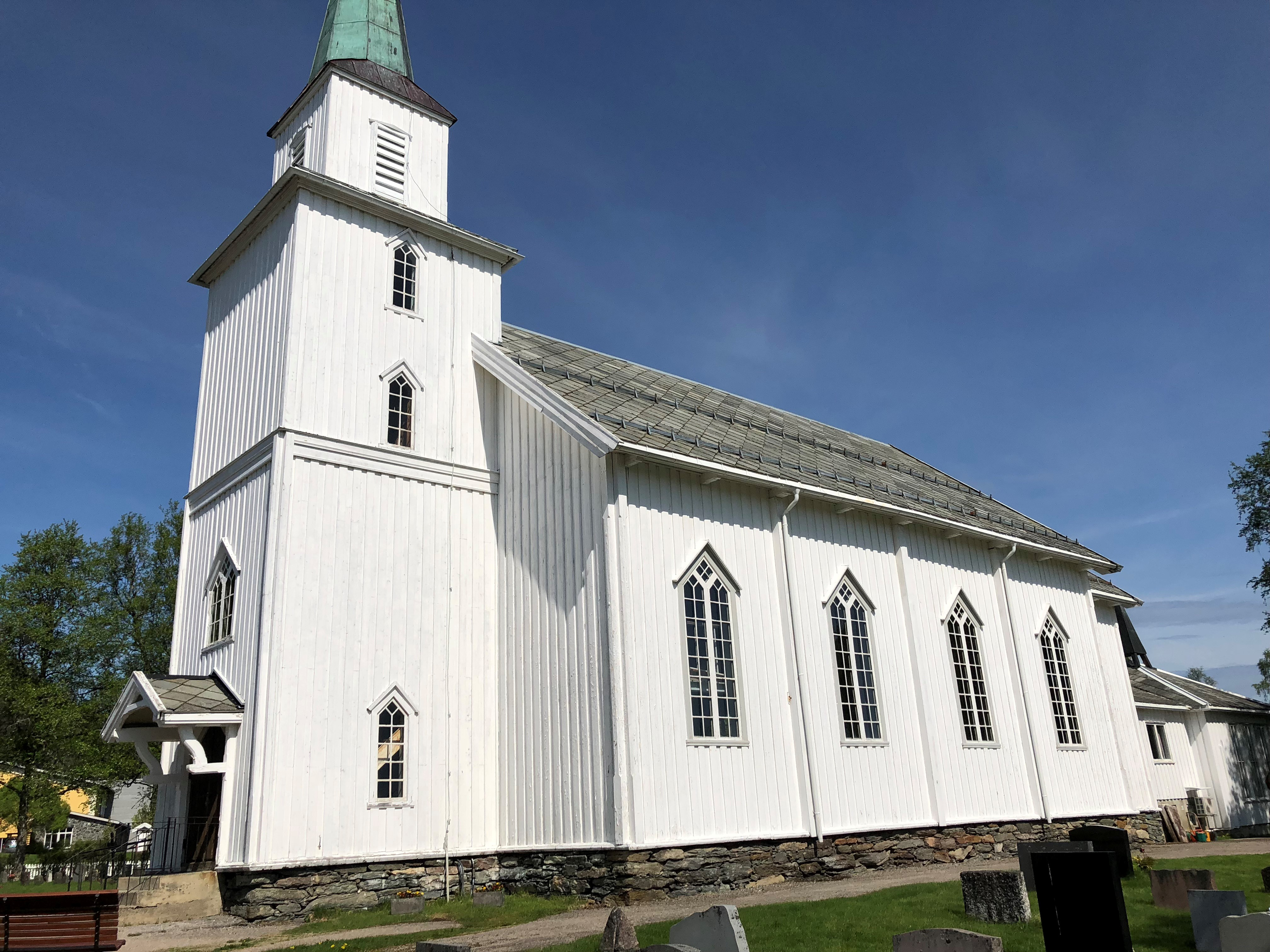

== See also ==
- List of churches in Nidaros
