= Ytterøy Church =

Church in Trøndelag, Norway

- Ytterøy kirke
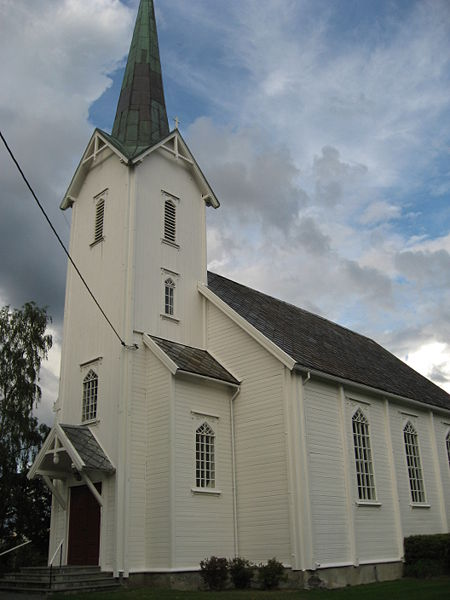
- View of the church
- Ytterøy Church
- 63.801770367°N 11.143518984°E
- Location: Levanger Municipality, Trøndelag
- Country: Norway
- Denomination: Church of Norway
- Churchmanship: Evangelical Lutheran

History
- Former name: Eid kirke
- Status: Parish church
- Founded: 14th century
- Consecrated: 14 Feb 1890

Architecture
- Functional status: Active
- Architect: Knut Guttormsen
- Architectural type: Long church
- Style: Neo-Gothic
- Completed: 1890 (136 years ago)

Specifications
- Capacity: 350
- Materials: Wood

Administration
- Diocese: Nidaros bispedømme
- Deanery: Stiklestad prosti
- Parish: Ytterøy
- Norwegian Cultural Heritage Site
- Type: Church
- Status: Listed
- ID: 85896

Ytterøy Church (Norwegian: Ytterøy kirke) is a parish church of the Church of Norway in Levanger Municipality in Trøndelag county, Norway. It is located on the island of Ytterøya, just north of the village of Hokstad. It is the church for the Ytterøy parish which is part of the Stiklestad prosti (deanery) in the Diocese of Nidaros. The white, wooden church was built in a long church style in 1890 using plans drawn up by the architect Knut Guttormsen and the lead builder was O. Günther. The church seats about 350 people.

== History ==
The earliest existing historical records of the church date back to the year 1533, but the church was built before that time. The first church on Ytterøya was a stave church that was known as Eid Church and it was located about 70 metres (230 ft) southwest of the present church site. It may have been founded during the 14th century. The old church was torn down in 1651 and it was replaced with a new timber-framed long church on the same site.

In 1814, this church served as an election church (Norwegian: valgkirke). Together with more than 300 other parish churches across Norway, it was a polling station for elections to the 1814 Norwegian Constituent Assembly which wrote the Constitution of Norway. This was Norway's first national elections. Each church parish was a constituency that elected people called "electors" who later met together in each county to elect the representatives for the assembly that was to meet at Eidsvoll Manor later that year.

During the 1880s, the cemetery that had surrounded the church was moved about 400 metres (1,300 ft) to the northeast to a better location on the property. The old cemetery location was very shallow and not suitable for use. When the new cemetery was completed (around 1889), about 100 bodies were exhumed from the old cemetery and moved to the new one. In 1890, the parish built a new church about 70 metres (230 ft) northeast of the old church site. The new church was consecrated on 14 February 1890. Many people were unhappy with the new church site and this caused a big dispute among the people of the parish that raged until 1902. This ultimately caused 81 people to resign their membership in the Church of Norway over this. The old church was torn down around the year 1900.

== See also ==
- List of churches in Nidaros
