= Verrabotn =

Village in Indre Fosen Municipality, Norway

- Village
- Interactive map of Verrabotn
- Location within Trøndelag Location within Norway
- Coordinates: 63.8026°N 10.5815°E
- Country: Norway
- Region: Central Norway
- County: Trøndelag
- District: Fosen
- Municipality: Indre Fosen
- Elevation: 7 m (23 ft)
- Time zone: UTC+01:00 (CET)
  - Summer (DST): UTC+02:00 (CEST)
- Post Code: 7797 Verrabotn

Verrabotn is a village located in Indre Fosen Municipality in Trøndelag county, Norway. It is located at end of the Verrasundet arm of the Trondheimsfjord. The village of Verrastranda lies about 20 kilometres (12 mi) to the northeast, the village of Trongsundet lies about 10 kilometres (6.2 mi) to the northeast (both in Steinkjer Municipality), and the village of Årnset lies about 40 kilometres (25 mi) to the southwest. Norwegian National Road 720 runs through the village, which formerly had a primary school. The village is the location of Fines Church.
