= Follafoss =

Village in Steinkjer Municipality, Norway

- Village
- Interactive map of Follafoss
- Location within Trøndelag Location within Norway
- Coordinates: 63.9863°N 11.1138°E
- Country: Norway
- Region: Central Norway
- County: Trøndelag
- District: Innherred
- Municipality: Steinkjer Municipality

Area
  - Total: 0.7 km^{2} (0.27 sq mi)
- Elevation: 18 m (59 ft)

Population (2024)
  - Total: 373
  - Density: 533/km^{2} (1,380/sq mi)
- Time zone: UTC+01:00 (CET)
  - Summer (DST): UTC+02:00 (CEST)
- Post Code: 7796 Follafoss

Follafoss is a village in Steinkjer Municipality in Trøndelag county, Norway. The village lies on the northern shore of the Beitstadfjorden, about halfway between the east and west end of the fjord. Follafoss village is about 12 kilometres (7.5 mi) southwest of the village of Malm and about 15 kilometres (9.3 mi) northeast of the village of Verrastranda.

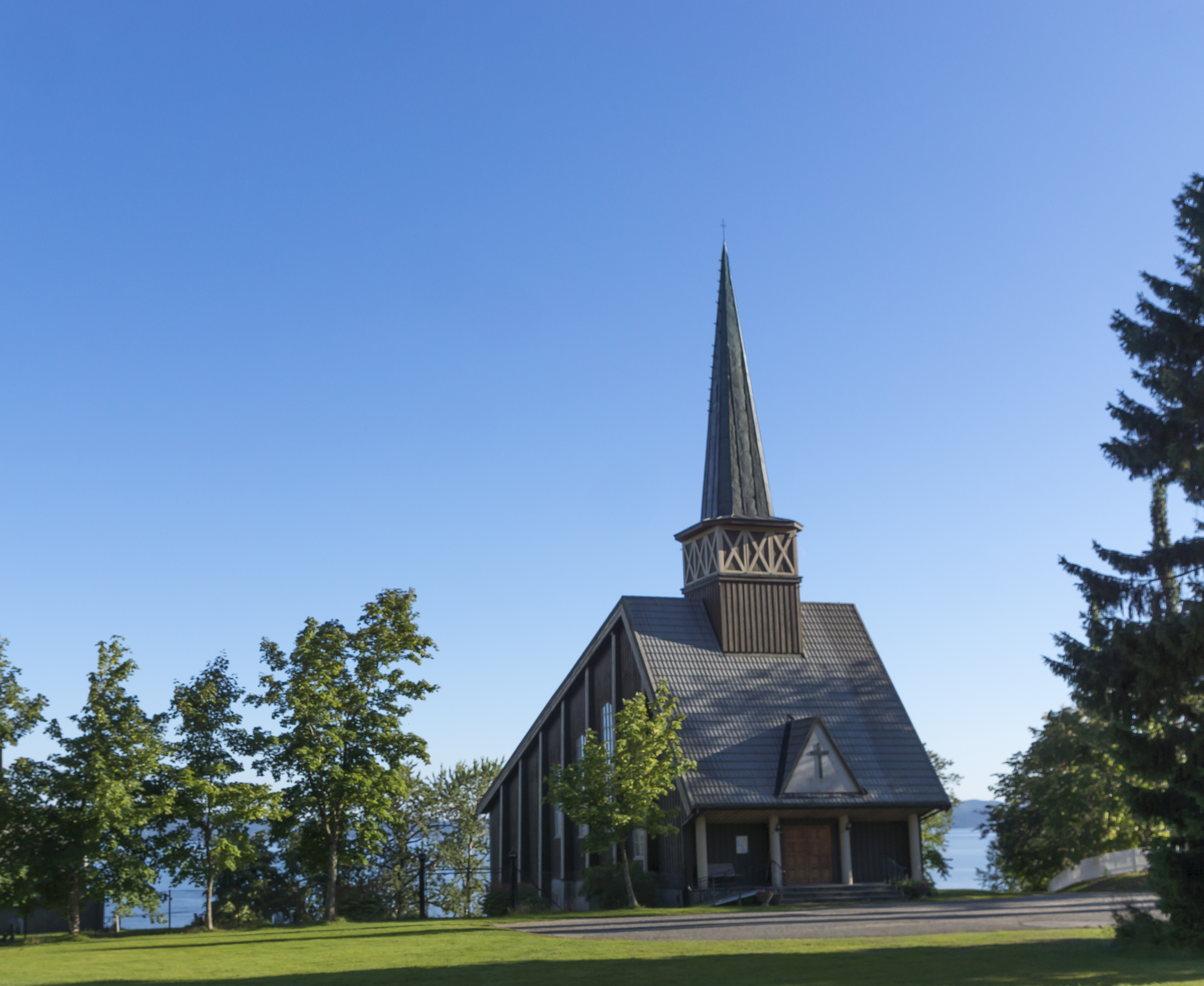
View of the Follafoss Church

The Follaelva river empties into the Trondheimsfjord at Follafoss. The lakes Holden and Selavatnet both feed the river and also provide power through the Nord-Trøndelag Elektrisitetsverk power company through hydroelectric power from the dams on the lakes.

The 0.7-square-kilometre (170-acre) village has a population (2024) of 373 and a population density of 533 inhabitants per square kilometre (1,380/sq mi).

Follafoss Church is located in the village. There is a pulp mill in the village, MMK FollaCell A.S., which is the largest employer in the area.
