= Malm =

Village in Steinkjer Municipality, Norway

- Village
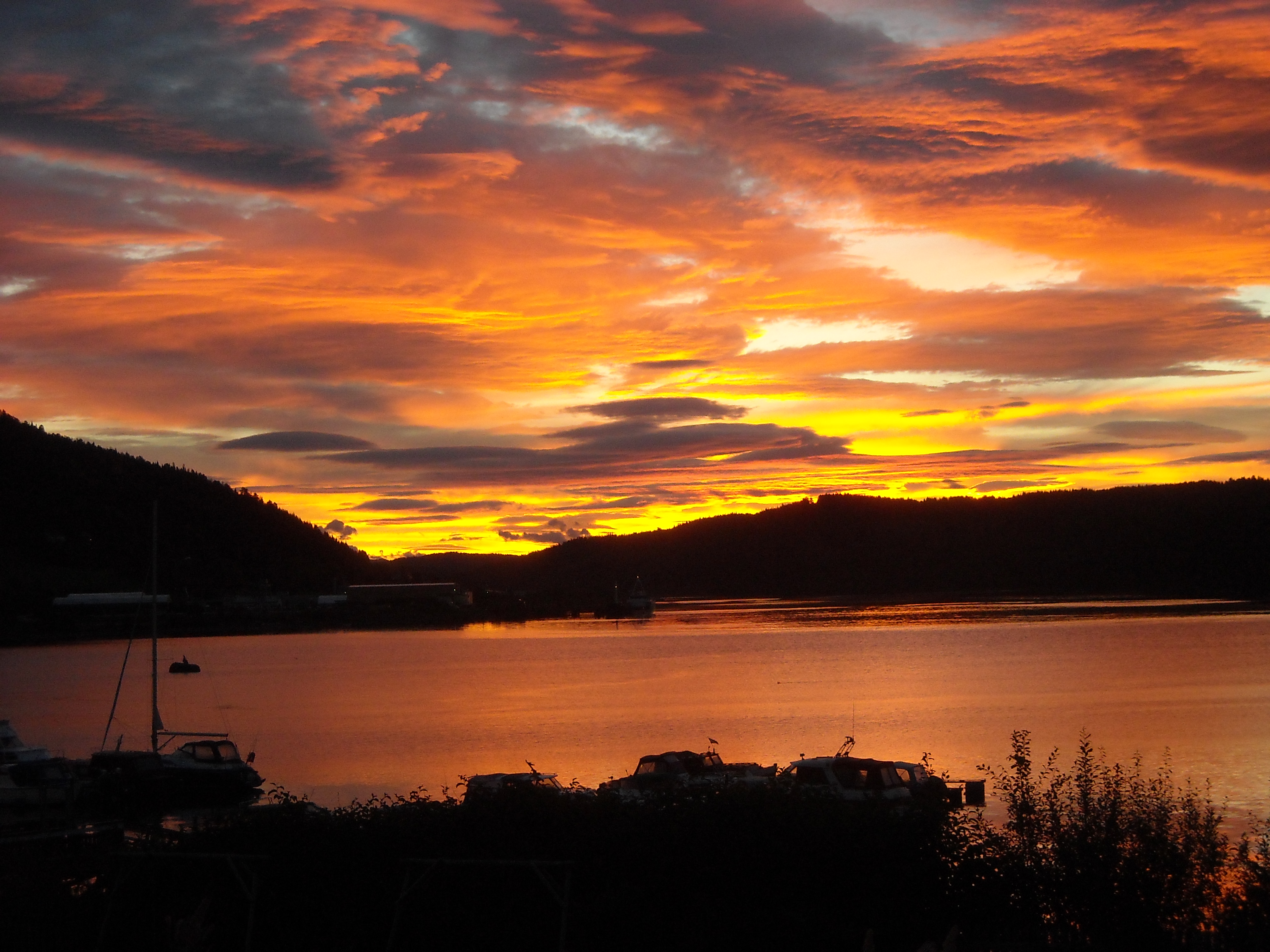
- View of the village
- Interactive map of Malm
- Location within Trøndelag Location within Norway
- Coordinates: 64.0753°N 11.2240°E
- Country: Norway
- Region: Central Norway
- County: Trøndelag
- District: Innherred
- Municipality: Steinkjer Municipality

Area
  - Total: 1.35 km^{2} (0.52 sq mi)
- Elevation: 8 m (26 ft)

Population (2024)
  - Total: 1,163
  - Density: 861/km^{2} (2,230/sq mi)
- Time zone: UTC+01:00 (CET)
  - Summer (DST): UTC+02:00 (CEST)
- Post Code: 7790 Malm

Malm is a village in Steinkjer Municipality in Trøndelag county, Norway. The village of Malm is located along the Beitstadsundet strait which flows into the Trondheimsfjorden. The village of Bartnes lies across the strait from Malm. The village lies about a 32 kilometres (20 mi) drive northwest of the town of Steinkjer, about 12 kilometres (7.5 mi) northwest of the village of Follafoss, and about 20 kilometres (12 mi) south of the village of Namdalseid (in neighboring Namsos Municipality). The Norwegian County Road 720 runs through the village.

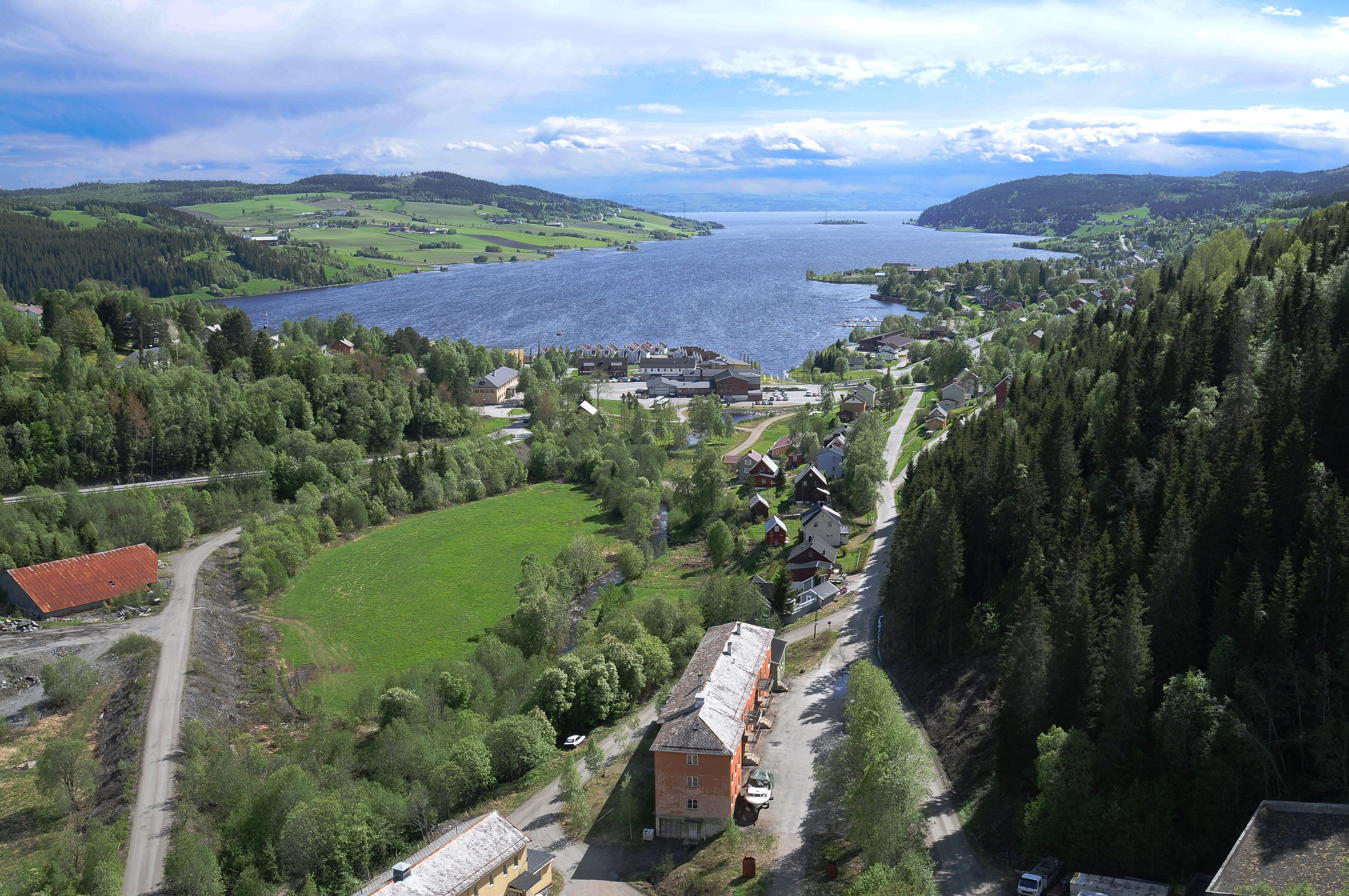
View of Malm

The village of Malm was also the administrative centre of the old Malm Municipality from 1913 until its dissolution in 1964 and then it was the administrative centre of the old Verran Municipality from 1964 until its dissolution in 2020. Malm Church is located in this village and serves as the main church for the parish.

The 1.35-square-kilometre (330-acre) village has a population (2024) of 1,163 and a population density of 861 inhabitants per square kilometre (2,230/sq mi).

== Economy ==
Long traditions with mining of iron and sulphur made Malm an industrial centre of the county. The mining company Fosdalen Bergverk was owned by the state of Norway and some of the profit was spent to build a top modern primary school. The school of Malm was one of three pioneer schools in Norway, which started a 3-year long middle school (junior high school, grades 7-9) in the 1950s. New small industry has been established since the end of the mining period, where steel constructions for offshore vessels and bridges are made.
