= Verrasundet =

Fjord in Trøndelag, Norway

- Interactive map of the fjord
- Location: Trøndelag county, Norway
- Coordinates: 63.8771°N 10.8592°E
- Type: Fjord
- Primary outflows: Beitstadfjorden
- Basin countries: Norway
- Max. length: 22 kilometres (14 mi)
- Max. width: 2 kilometres (1.2 mi)

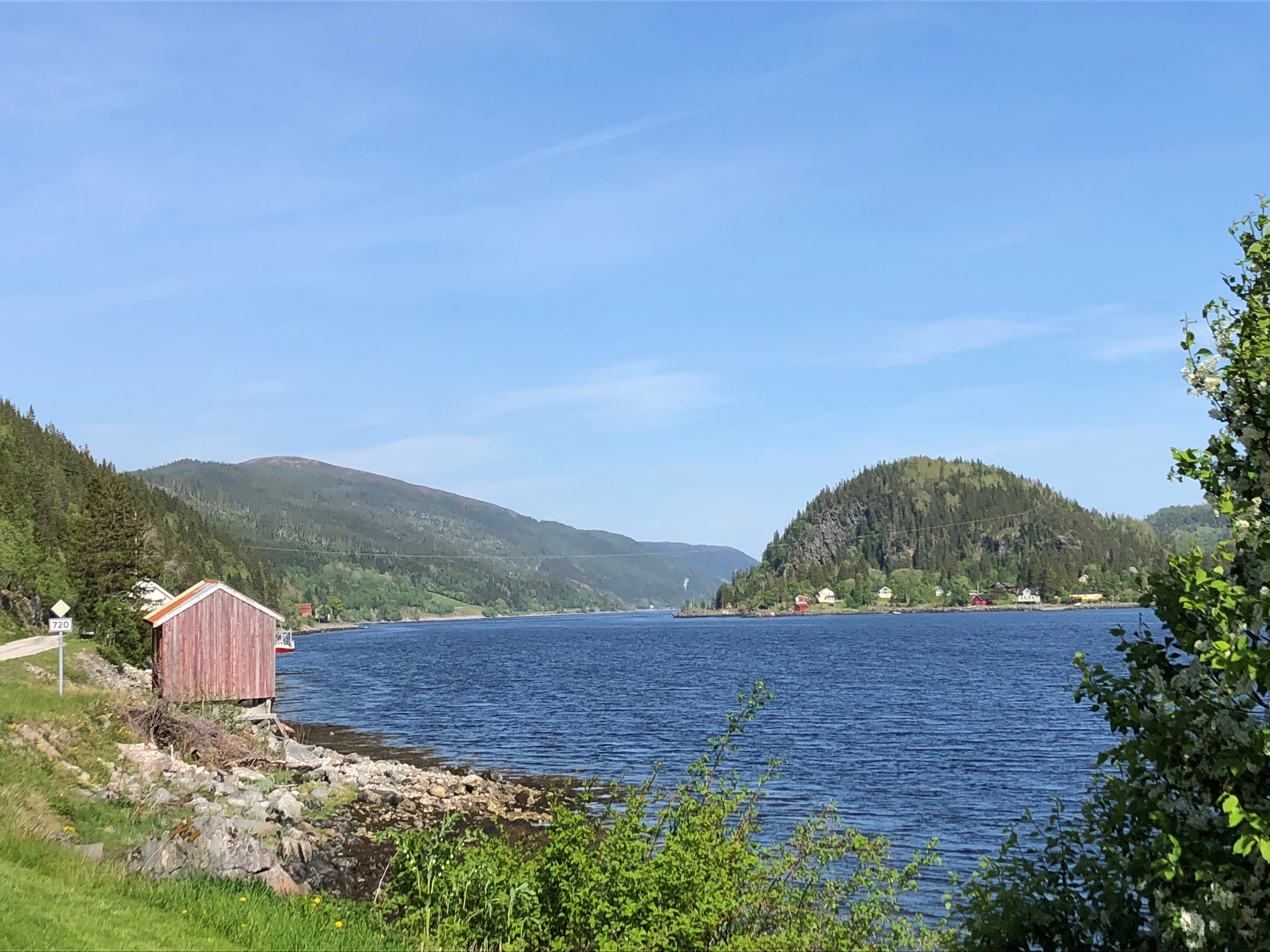
Verrasundet in Trondheimsfjorden, Trøndelag, Norway at its most narrow point Trongsundet

Verrasundet is a fjord in Trøndelag county, Norway. The 22-kilometre (14 mi) long fjord branches off of the northern part of the vast Trondheimsfjorden in Indre Fosen Municipality, Steinkjer Municipality, and Inderøy Municipality. It extends from Beitstadfjorden to the village of Verrabotn. The fjord is a maximum of 2 kilometres (1.2 mi) wide, but at Trongsundet, the fjord is barely 200 metres (660 ft) wide.

== See also ==
- List of Norwegian fjords
