= Inderøy =

Inderøy may refer to:

== Places ==
- Inderøy Municipality, a municipality in Trøndelag county, Norway
- Inderøya, a peninsula within Inderøy Municipality in Trøndelag county, Norway

== Other ==
- Inderøy District Court, a former district court in Trøndelag, Norway
- Inderøy IL, a sports club based in Inderøy Municipality in Trøndelag county, Norway
