= Utoy =

Utøy or Utoy can refer to:

== Places ==
- Utøy, Norway, a village
- Achernar Island (also known as Utöy), an island off of Antarctica
- Utoy Creek, Georgia, United States

== Other uses ==
- Utøy School, Utøy, Norway
- Utoy (TV series), a Filipino television series
- Utoy, a character in Ang Panday, a Filipino television series
- Utoy, a character in Pugad Baboy, a Filipino comic strip

== See also ==
- Battle of Utoy Creek, an American Civil War battle
- Utøya, an island in Norway
- Utö, Finland, an island in the Archipelago Sea, in southwest Finland
- Utö, Sweden, an island in the Stockholm archipelago in Sweden
