= Kjerknesvågen =

Village in Inderøy Municipality, Norway

- Village
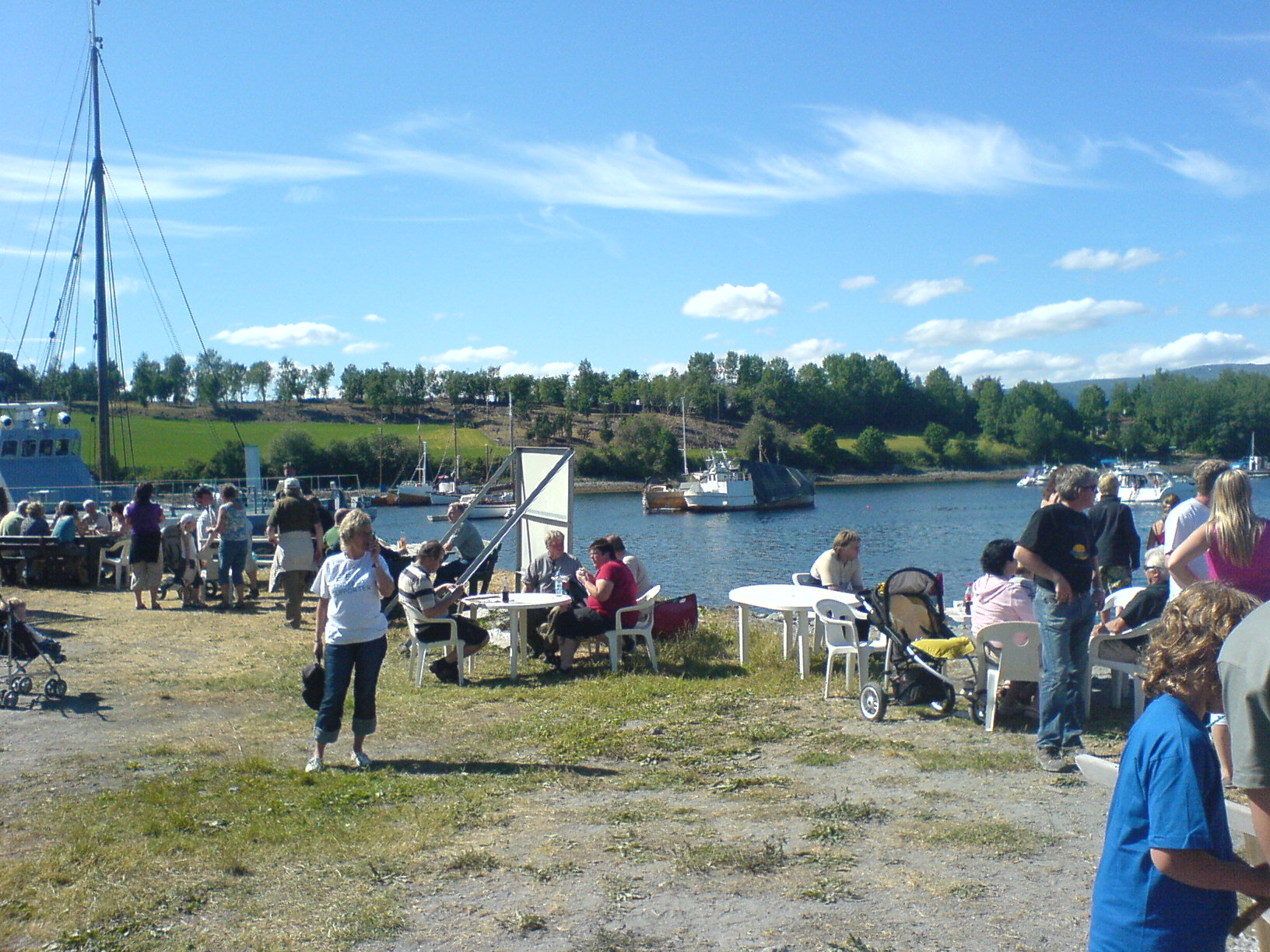
- View of the harbor at Kjerknesvågen
- Interactive map of Kjerknesvågen
- Location within Trøndelag Location within Norway
- Coordinates: 63.9120°N 11.1904°E
- Country: Norway
- Region: Central Norway
- County: Trøndelag
- District: Innherred
- Municipality: Inderøy Municipality
- Elevation: 8 m (26 ft)
- Time zone: UTC+01:00 (CET)
  - Summer (DST): UTC+02:00 (CEST)
- Post Code: 7670 Inderøy

Kjerknesvågen is a village in Inderøy Municipality in Trøndelag county, Norway. It is located along the Trondheimsfjord on the northwestern shore of the Inderøya peninsula, about 8 kilometres (5.0 mi) north of the village of Utøya.

The village features a general store and a harbour. Located a few kilometers to the east is Lyngstad School that serves as an elementary school. The harbour is known for its annual Båttreff, a marine fair including a regatta. The dominant industry around the village is farming.
