= Jon Ramstad =

Norwegian politician (1925–2014)

Jon Ramstad (27 September 1925 – 17 October 2014) was a Norwegian educator, sports official and politician for the Centre Party.

He took his education at the Norwegian College of Agriculture in 1955, and worked at the horticultural schools in Telemark, Mære and Staup. He was also a rector of the latter school.

He was elected as a deputy representative to the Parliament of Norway from Nord-Trøndelag during the term 1969–1973. He was the mayor of Levanger Municipality from 1976 to 1980, and was both preceded and succeeded by Jarle Haugan. He has also been chairman of Nord-Trøndelag Idrettskrets, and a board member of the Norwegian Confederation of Sports and Røra Fabrikker.

He resided in Levanger Municipality. His brother Ivar Ramstad was a farmer in Inderøy Municipality and an Olympic discus thrower.
