= Straumen, Trøndelag =

Village in Inderøy Municipality, Norway

Straumen
- Village
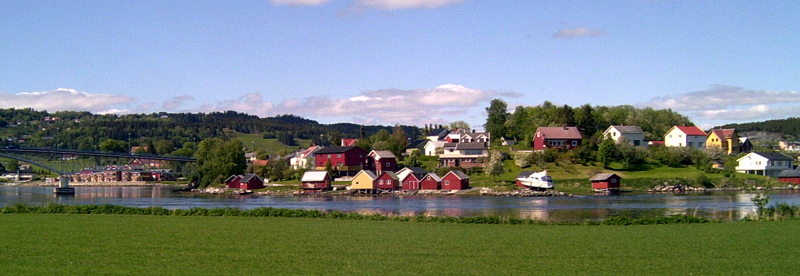
- View of the village
- Interactive map of Straumen
- Location within Trøndelag Location within Norway
- Coordinates: 63.8716°N 11.2962°E
- Country: Norway
- Region: Central Norway
- County: Trøndelag
- District: Innherred
- Municipality: Inderøy Municipality

Area
  - Total: 1.43 km^{2} (0.55 sq mi)
- Elevation: 8 m (26 ft)

Population (2024)
  - Total: 1,900
  - Density: 1,329/km^{2} (3,440/sq mi)
- Time zone: UTC+01:00 (CET)
  - Summer (DST): UTC+02:00 (CEST)
- Post Code: 7670 Inderøy

Straumen is the administrative centre of Inderøy Municipality in Trøndelag county, Norway. It is located along the Trondheimsfjord at the northeastern side of the Inderøya peninsula, next to the Børgin fjord. The village lies about 2 kilometres (1.2 mi) east of the village of Sakshaug and about 7 kilometres (4.3 mi) west of the villages of Røra and Hylla. The village has a slaughterhouse, a folk high school, and a museum. The Sakshaug Church and the historic Old Sakshaug Church lie just west of Straumen.

The 1.43-square-kilometre (350-acre) village has a population (2024) of 1,900 and a population density of 1,329 inhabitants per square kilometre (3,440/sq mi).

== Media gallery ==
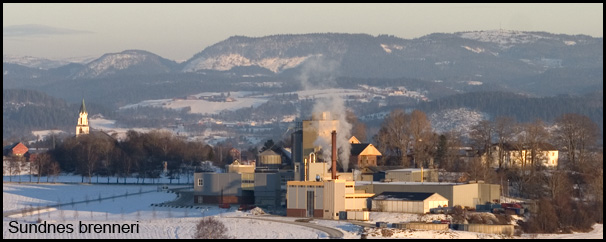
View of the village

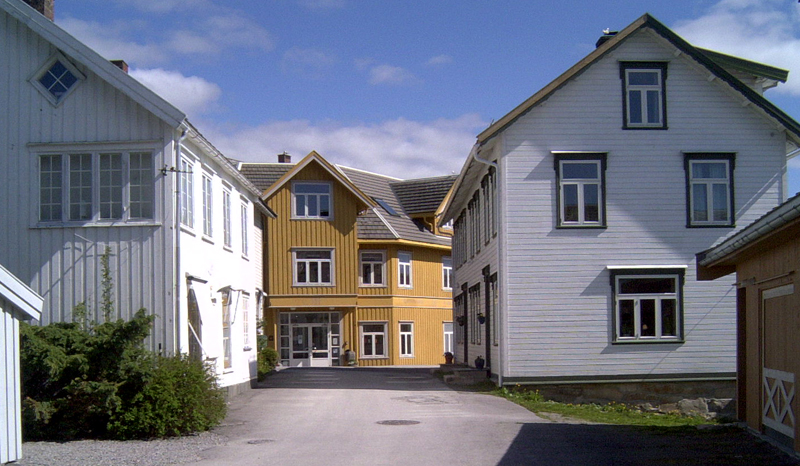
Typical street and houses

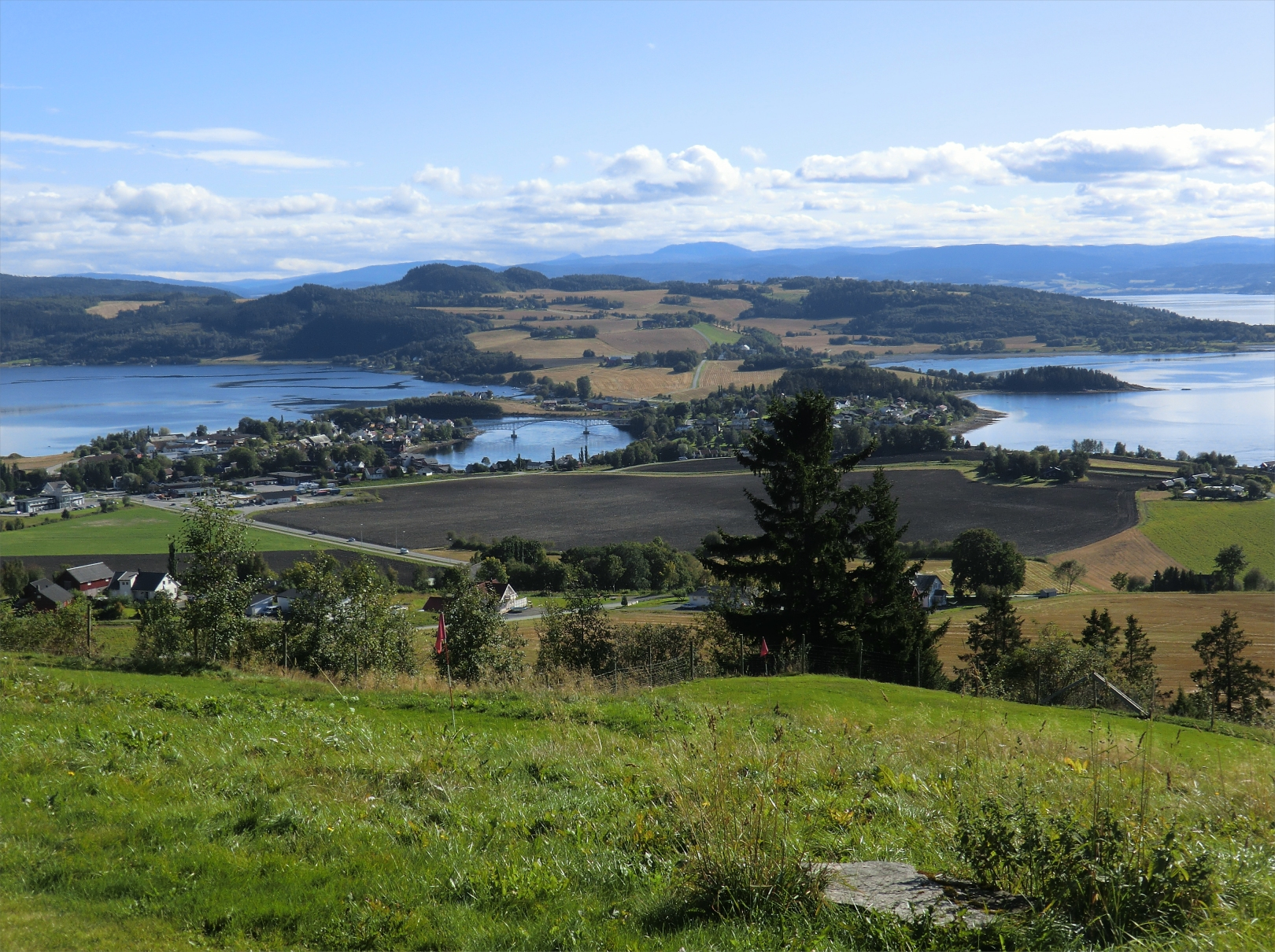
View of the village from a distance

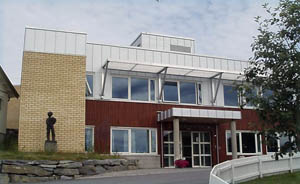
Retirement home

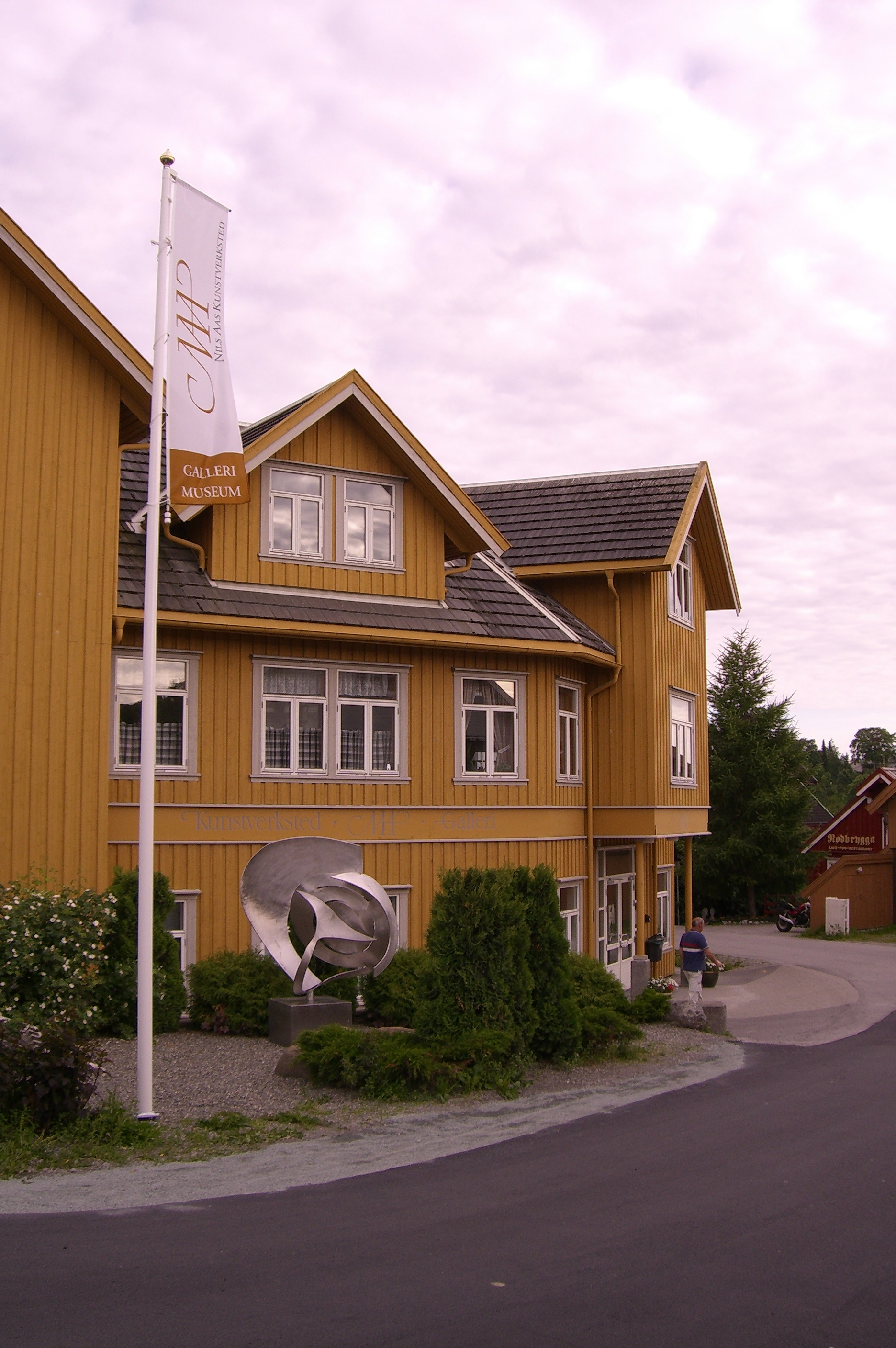
Bølge

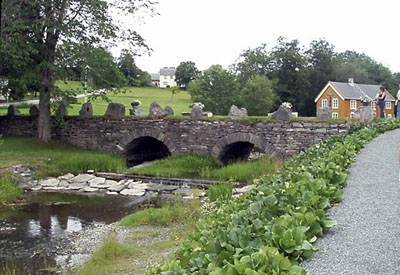
Park in Straumen

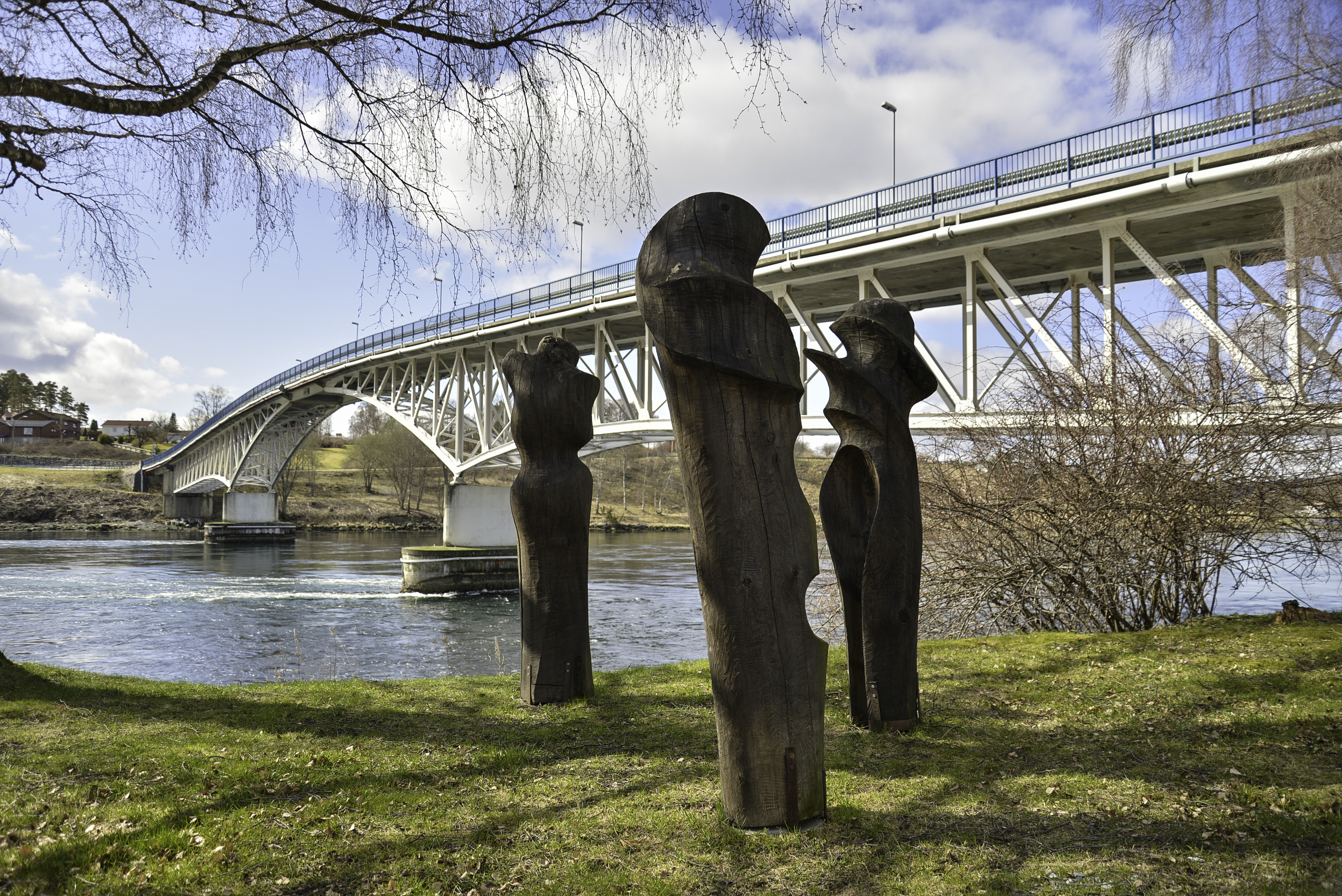
Bridge towards Røra
