= Ivar Ramstad =

Norwegian discus thrower

Ivar Ramstad (3 February 1924 – 26 April 2009) was a Norwegian discus thrower.

He worked as a farmer at the farm Nygjerdet, just west of Røra in Røra Municipality (now part of Inderøy Municipality). He also had a career in Gjensidige. His brother Jon Ramstad was mayor of Levanger Municipality.

His personal best throw was 52.32 metres, achieved in July 1948 on Bislett Stadion. This stood as a Norwegian record in the discus throw for eleven years. It is still the county record for Nord-Trøndelag. At the 1948 Summer Olympics he finished fourth in the discus final with a throw of 49.21 metres. He has stated that he did not retain his form from July due to farming work.

He became Norwegian champion in discus throw in the years 1947–1949, representing Røra IL. His main competitor was Stein Johnson. He received the Norwegian Athletics Association Gold Medal, and was an honorary member of Røra IL.

Ramstad died in April 2009. He was buried at Sakshaug Church.
