= Sakshaug =

Village in Inderøy Municipality, Norway

- Village
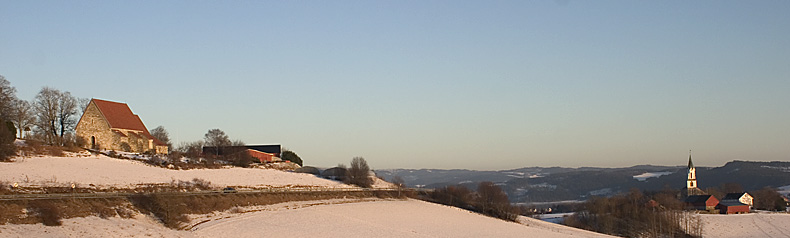
- View of the two churches
- Interactive map of Sakshaug
- Location within Trøndelag Location within Norway
- Coordinates: 63.8746°N 11.2745°E
- Country: Norway
- Region: Central Norway
- County: Trøndelag
- District: Innherred
- Municipality: Inderøy Municipality

Area
  - Total: 0.16 km^{2} (0.062 sq mi)
- Elevation: 35 m (115 ft)

Population (2012)
  - Total: 224
  - Density: 1,400/km^{2} (3,600/sq mi)
- Time zone: UTC+01:00 (CET)
  - Summer (DST): UTC+02:00 (CEST)
- Post Code: 7670 Inderøy

Sakshaug is a village in Inderøy Municipality in Trøndelag county, Norway. It is located on the Inderøya peninsula, about 1.5 kilometres (0.93 mi) northwest of the municipal center of Straumen and about 5 kilometres (3.1 mi) northeast of the village of Utøya.

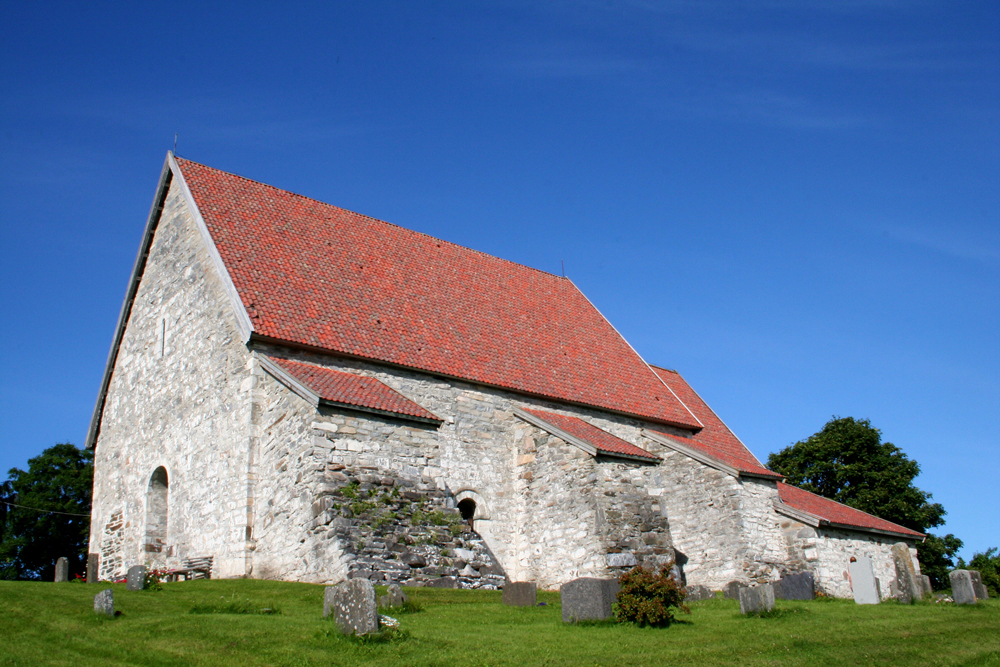
Old Sakshaug Church

The Old Sakshaug Church is located on the eastern edge of the village, and the newer Sakshaug Church lies a little farther to the east, closer to Straumen. The Norwegian County Road 755 runs through the village.

The 0.16-square-kilometre (40-acre) village had a population (2012) of 224 and a population density of 1,400 inhabitants per square kilometre (3,600/sq mi). Since 2012, the population and area data for this village area has not been separately tracked by Statistics Norway, but instead it has been considered part of the Straumen urban area.
