= Utøya, Inderøy =

Village in Inderøy Municipality, Norway

Utøya
- Village
- Interactive map of Utøya
- Location within Trøndelag Location within Norway
- Coordinates: 63.84866°N 11.10021°E
- Country: Norway
- Region: Central Norway
- County: Trøndelag
- District: Innherred
- Municipality: Inderøy Municipality
- Elevation: 79 m (259 ft)
- Time zone: UTC+01:00 (CET)
  - Summer (DST): UTC+02:00 (CEST)
- Post Code: 7670 Inderøy

Utøya is a village area in Inderøy Municipality in Trøndelag county, Norway. The village sits about halfway between the village of Vangshylla (to the southwest) and the village of Sakshaug (to the northeast). The village of Kjerknesvågen lies about 6 kilometres (3.7 mi) to the north and the Trondheimsfjord lies just to the south. The area of Utøya generally includes the area around the village which is the southern part of the Inderøya peninsula.

== Economy ==
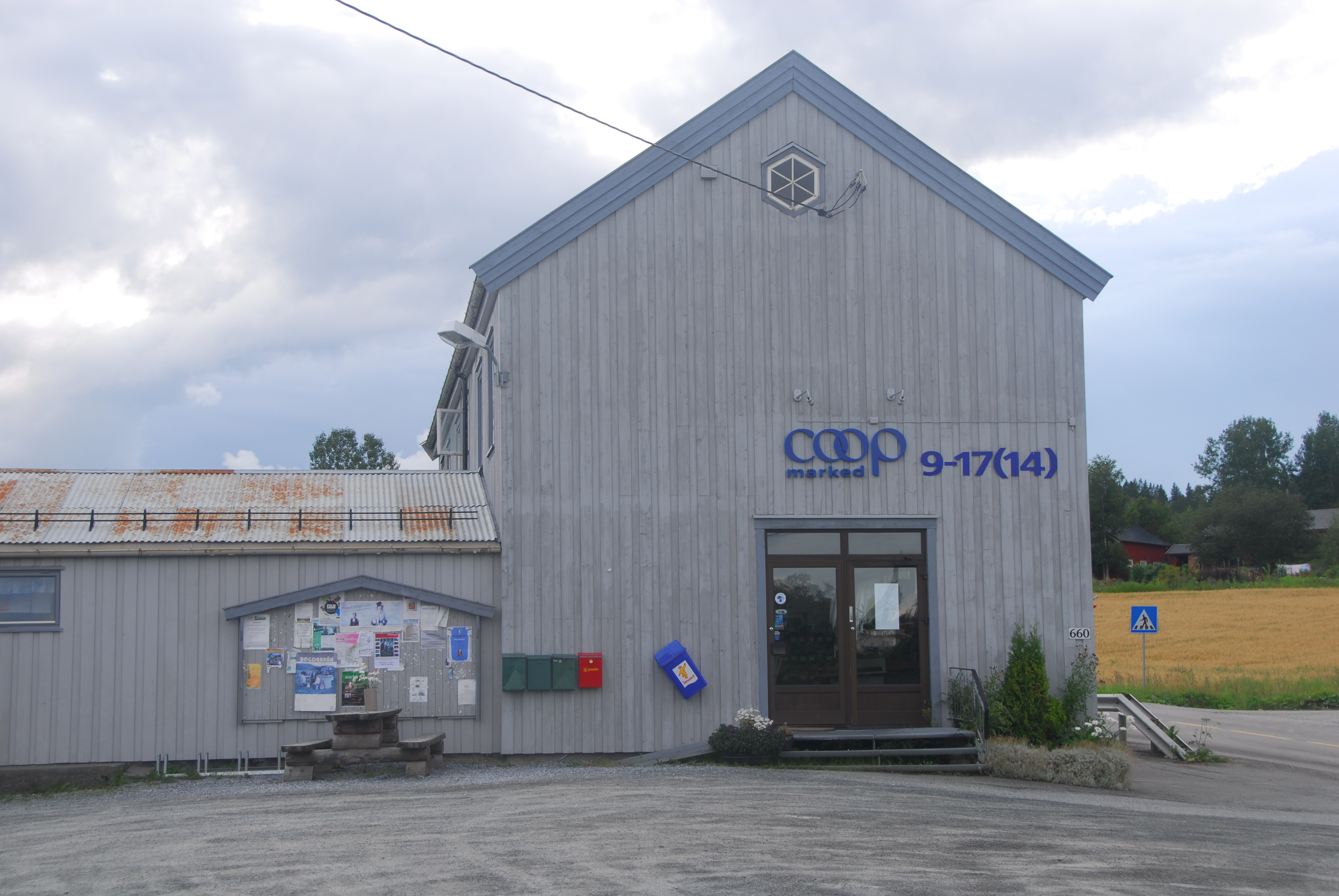
Coop Marked store in Utøy

The predominant employment in for the Utøya area is agriculture, as in the rest of Inderøy, in addition to functioning as a suburb of Steinkjer, Verdal, and Levanger. There is no notable industry, but the area has a Coop Marked grocery store, Utøy School, kindergarten, and amateur theatre.

At nearby Vangshylla, there is a hotel that specializes in fishing tourism in the fjord, a boat harbor, and also located there is the Skarnsund Bridge that when it opened in 1991 was the longest cable-stayed bridge in the world and connects the old Mosvik Municipality area to Innherred.

== Notable residents ==
Notable people from Utøy include Willy Ustad, a novelist; Ole Richter, Norwegian Prime Minister in Stockholm, and actress Ingrid Bolsø Berdal.
