= Børgin =

Fjord in Trøndelag, Norway

- Interactive map of the fjord
- Location: Trøndelag county, Norway
- Coordinates: 63.8854°N 11.3379°E
- Type: Fjord
- Primary outflows: Trondheimsfjorden
- Basin countries: Norway
- Max. length: 10 kilometres (6.2 mi)
- Max. width: 1 to 3 km (0.62 to 1.86 mi)
- Settlements: Straumen

Børgin is a fjord branch in the eastern part of Trondheimsfjorden in Steinkjer Municipality and Inderøy Municipality in Trøndelag county, Norway. The 10-kilometre (6.2 mi) long fjord is about 1 to 3 kilometres (0.62 to 1.86 mi) wide, although the mouth of the fjord is only 100 metres (330 ft) wide. The mouth of the fjord is by the village of Straumen and there is a bridge across the fjord at its narrowest point.

== See also ==
- List of Norwegian fjords
