= Karin Kjølmoen =

Norwegian politician

Karin Kjølmoen (born 8 February 1946 in Steinkjer) is a Norwegian politician for the Labour Party.

From 1995 to 1996, during the third cabinet Brundtland, she was appointed State Secretary in the Ministry of Local Government and Work Affairs. She served as a deputy representative to the Norwegian Parliament from Nord-Trøndelag during the terms 1993–1997, 1997–2001 and 2001–2005. From 2000 to 2001 she was a regular representative, covering for Bjarne Håkon Hanssen who was appointed to the first cabinet Stoltenberg.

Kjølmoen was deputy mayor of Inderøy Municipality from 1983 to 1987, and later mayor from 1990 to 1995.
