= Old Sakshaug Church =

Church in Trøndelag, Norway

- Sakshaug gamle kirke
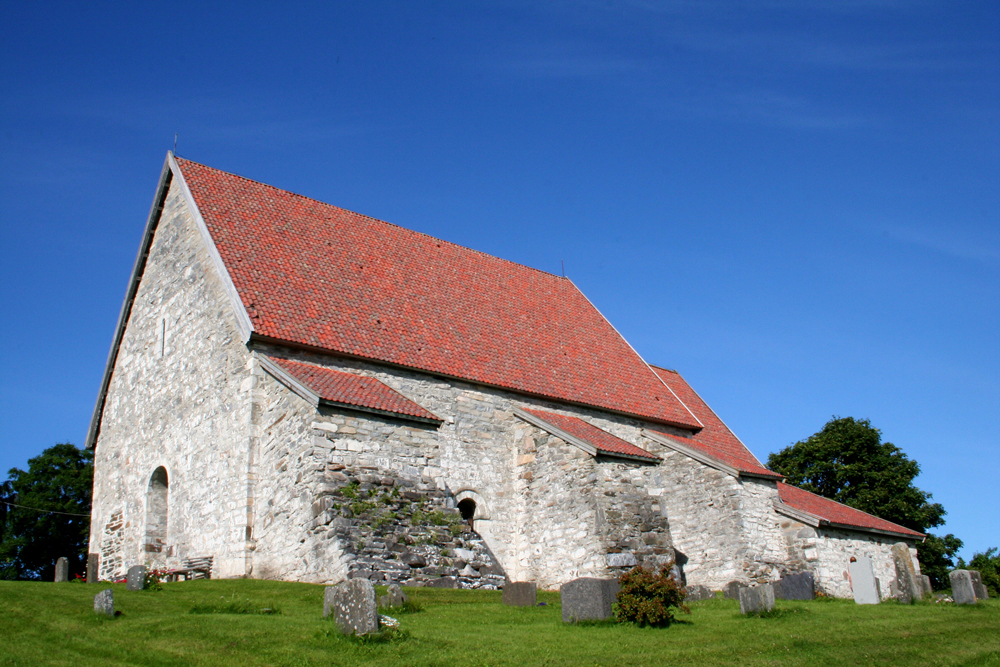
- View of the church
- Old Sakshaug Church
- 63.87516145°N 11.268162846°E
- Location: Inderøy Municipality, Trøndelag
- Country: Norway
- Denomination: Church of Norway
- Previous denomination: Catholic Church
- Churchmanship: Evangelical Lutheran

History
- Status: Parish church
- Founded: c. 1150
- Consecrated: 1184

Architecture
- Functional status: Preserved
- Architectural type: Long church
- Completed: 1184 (842 years ago)

Specifications
- Capacity: 200
- Materials: Limestone

Administration
- Diocese: Nidaros bispedømme
- Deanery: Stiklestad prosti
- Parish: Inderøy
- Norwegian Cultural Heritage Site
- Type: Church
- Status: Automatically protected
- ID: 28100

Old Sakshaug Church (Norwegian: Sakshaug gamle kirke) is a preserved, former parish church of the Church of Norway in Inderøy Municipality in Trøndelag county, Norway. It is located in the village of Sakshaug, just west of the municipal centre of Straumen. It is the former main church for the Inderøy parish which is part of the Stiklestad prosti (deanery) in the Diocese of Nidaros. The stone church was built in a long church style around the year 1184 using plans drawn up by an unknown architect. The church seats about 200 people.

== History ==
The earliest existing historical records of the church date back to the year 1433, but the church was not built that year. The stone church was likely constructed over a period of time stretching from about 1150 to 1180. The medieval church is one of the oldest churches in Trøndelag. The choir is the oldest part of the building, being built around 1150. The nave was constructed over the next couple of decades. At the end of the 18th century, an inscription was found in the building that stated that the church was consecrated in 1184 by Eysteinn Erlendsson, Archbishop of the Diocese of Nidaros. The choir was modernized with Gothic details in the early 1200s.

The walls are built of limestone. Around the year 1400, supporting walls were built on the south side. It is Romanesque in design and has rounded portals to the south, west and north. The arch of the north gate is decorated with chevrons. The choir area is early Gothic in design. Around 1440, a sacristy was built. The church once had a west tower, but it had to be demolished during the Middle Ages. The pulpit is of wood and from 1646 and was carved by Trøndelag-based artist and craftsman Johan Johansen and painted by Johan Hanssønn. The baroque altarpiece dates back to 1692. It has been suggested that the carving of a woman in the church is one of three alleged examples of sheela na gig in Norway, the others being at Trondheim and Stiklestad; but the Sakshaug carving is "somewhat suspect as it appears to be more of a pine cone than sheela na gig."

In 1814, this church served as an election church (Norwegian: valgkirke). Together with more than 300 other parish churches across Norway, it was a polling station for elections to the 1814 Norwegian Constituent Assembly which wrote the Constitution of Norway. This was Norway's first national elections. Each church parish was a constituency that elected people called "electors" who later met together in each county to elect the representatives for the assembly that was to meet at Eidsvoll Manor later that year.

In 1870-1871, a new Sakshaug Church was built about 500 metres (1,600 ft) to the southeast of the old church. After the new church was completed, the old church was closed. The wood roof, tower, decor, and other woodwork were removed and sold. The only parts of the building that remained were the stone walls. The ownership of the church was transferred to the Society for the Preservation of Ancient Norwegian Monuments in 1873. The church ruins sat for years without anything being done, but in the early 20th century, work began to restore the church. The ruins were finally enclosed by a roof in 1926. Work continued over the years, being finally completed in 1958 when the historic church was re-consecrated.

== Media gallery ==
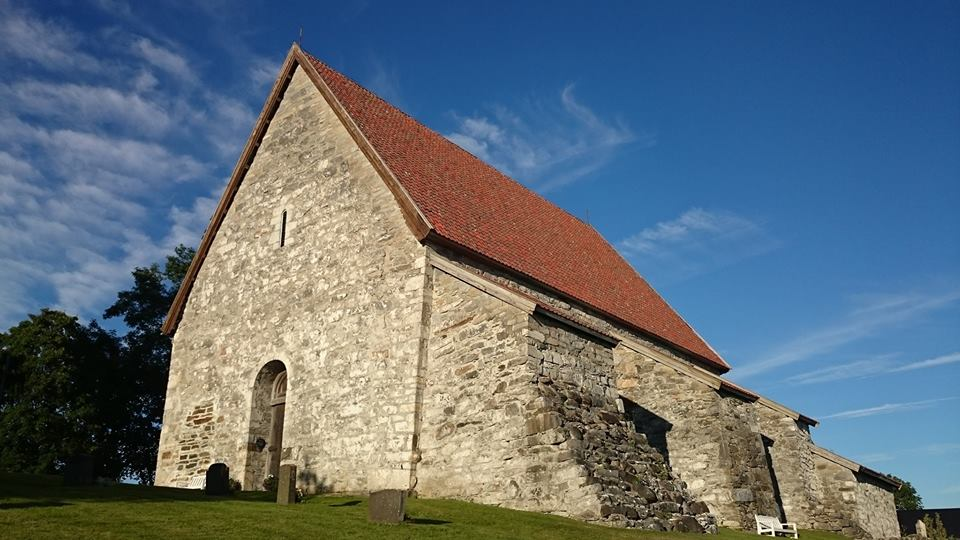

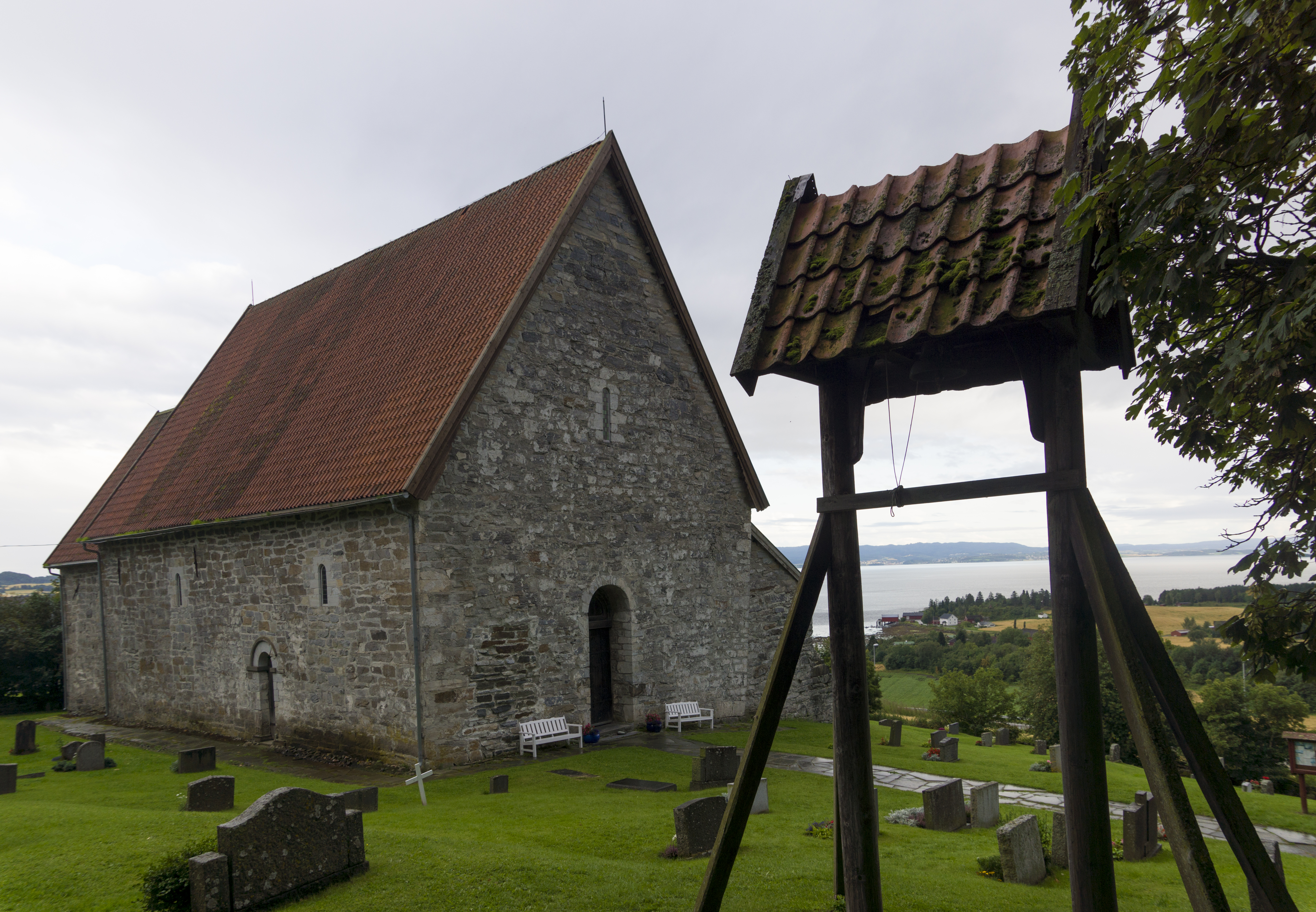

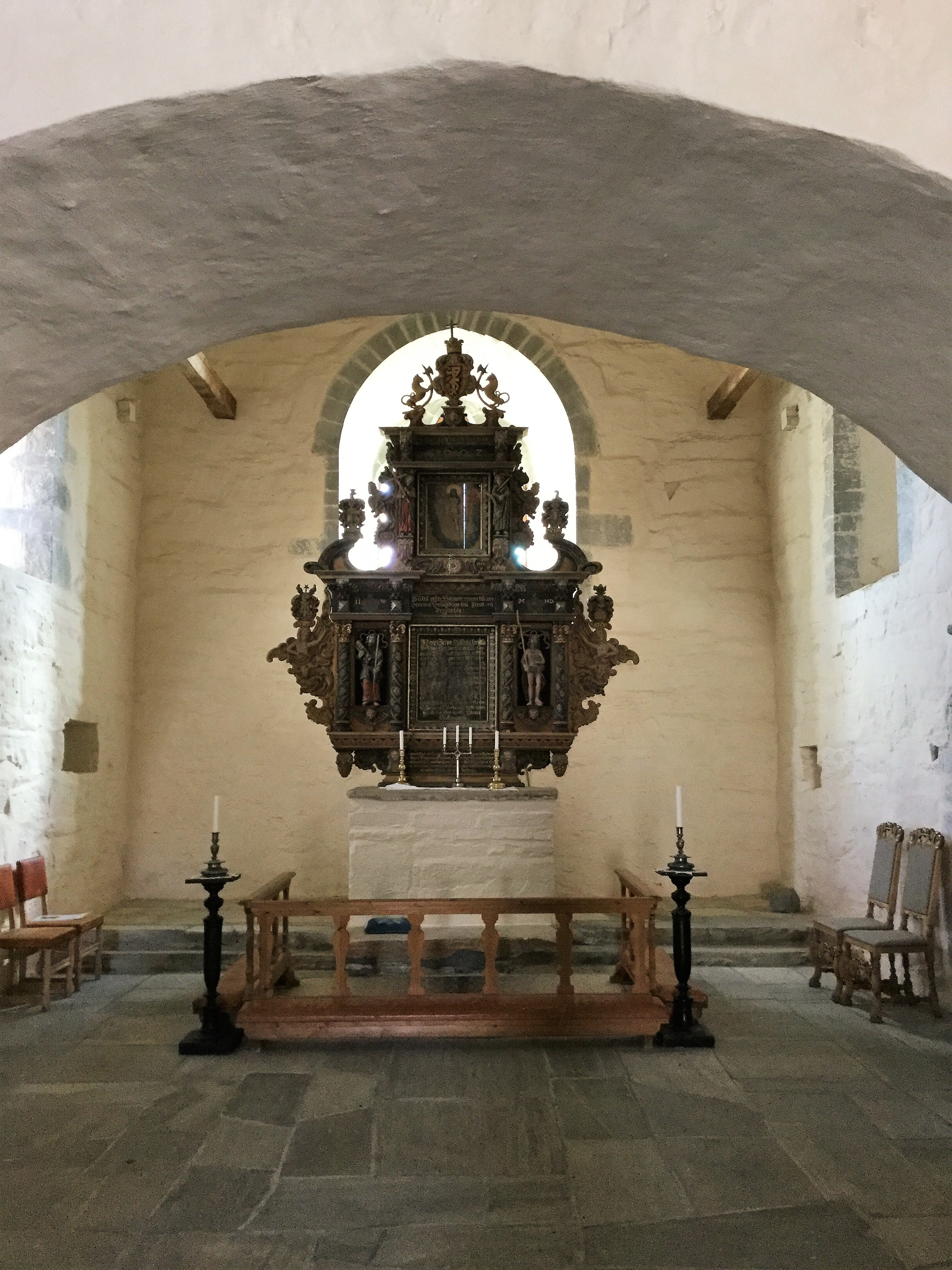

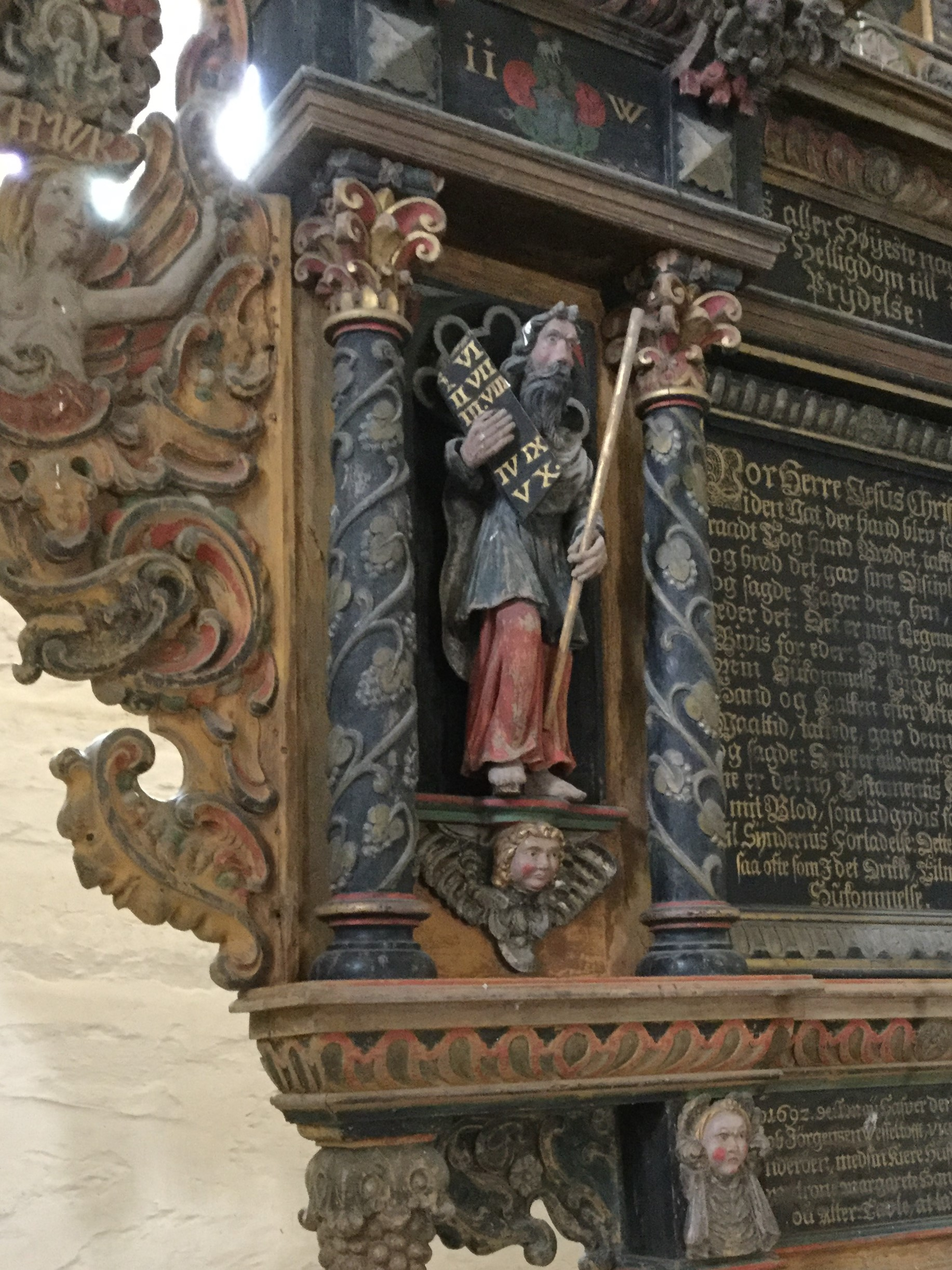

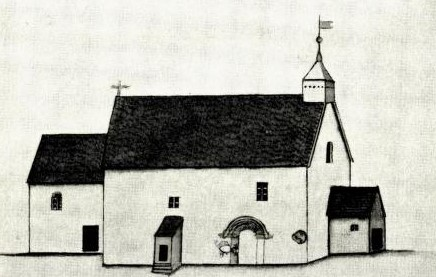

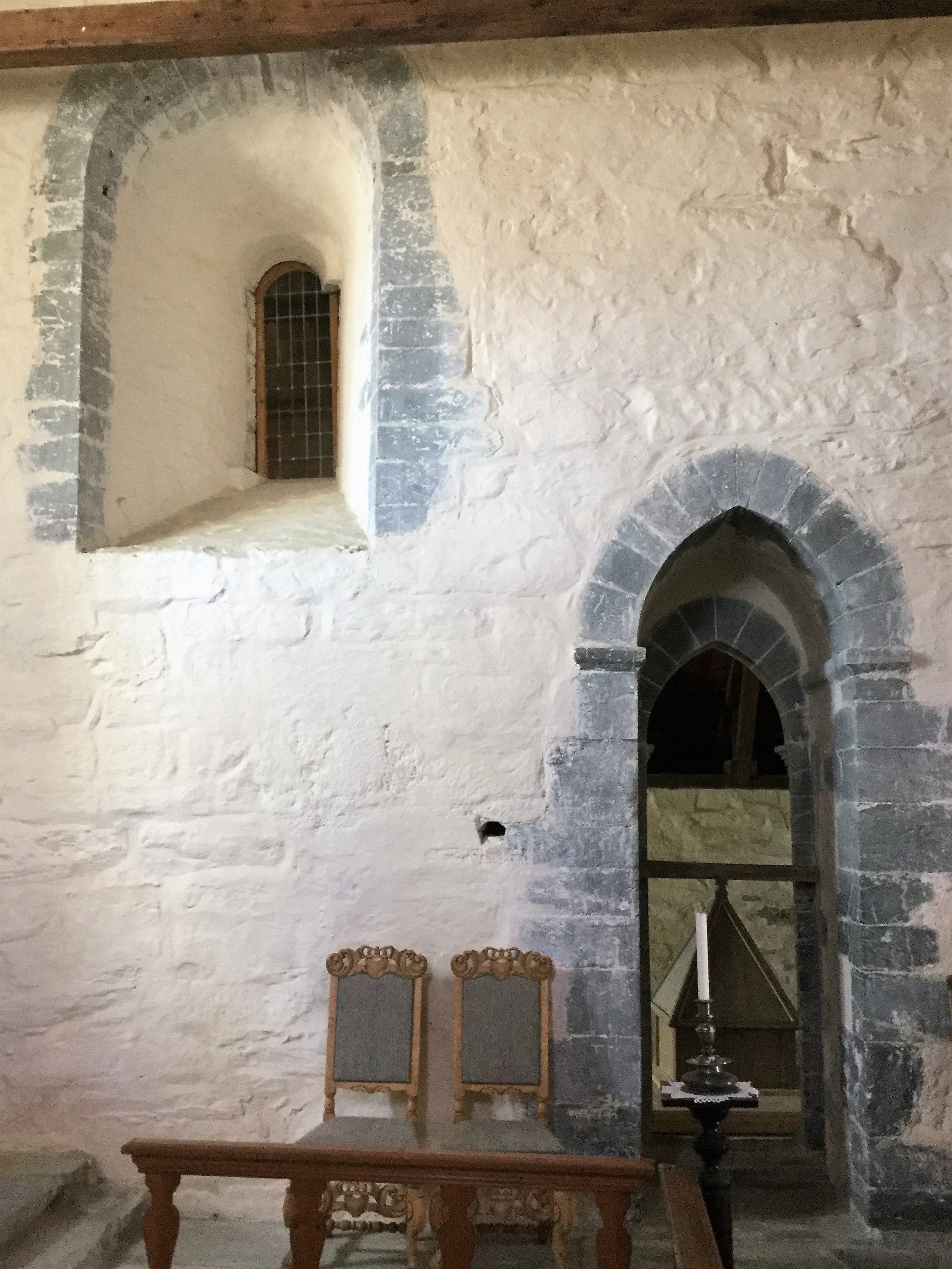

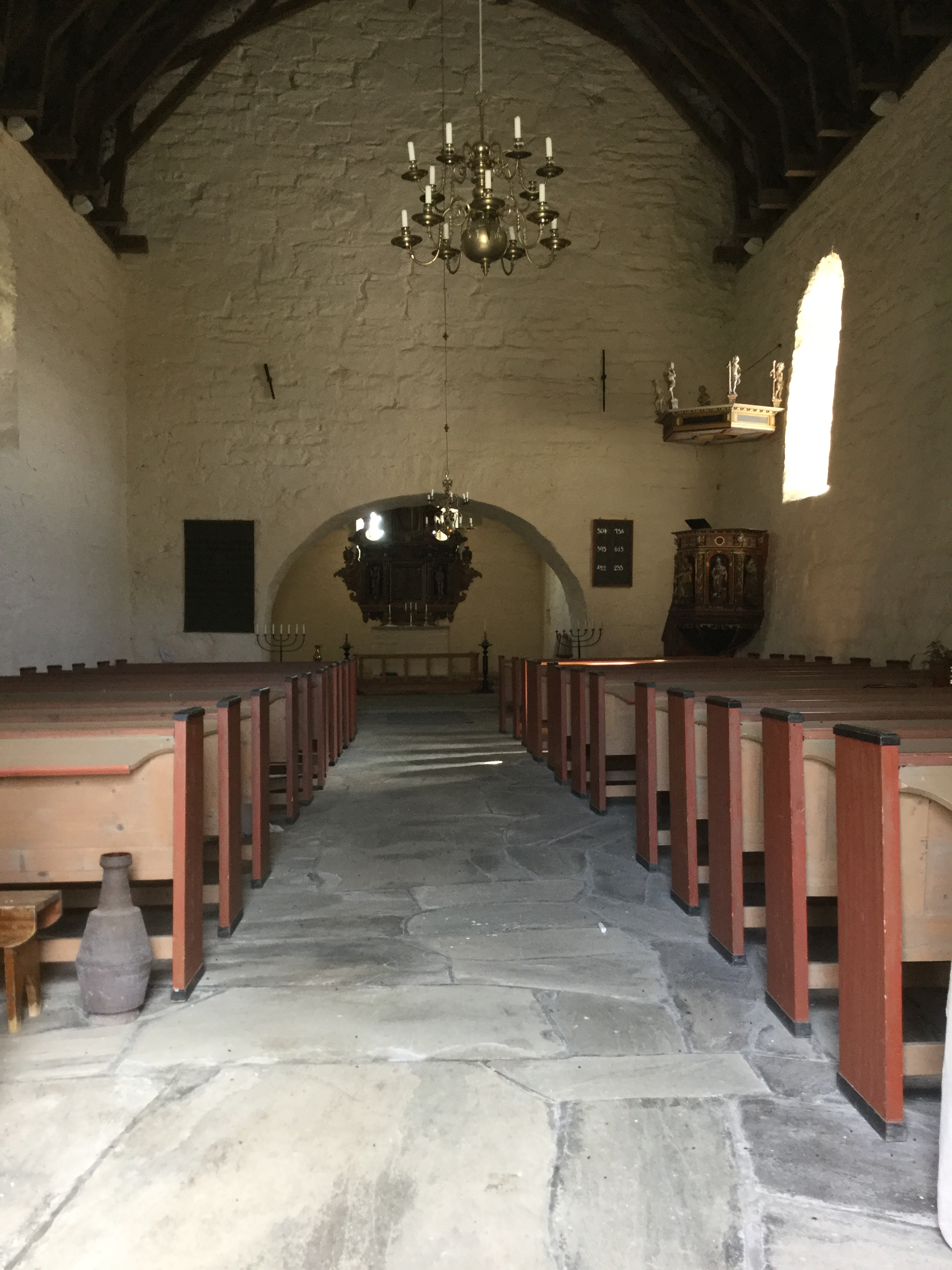

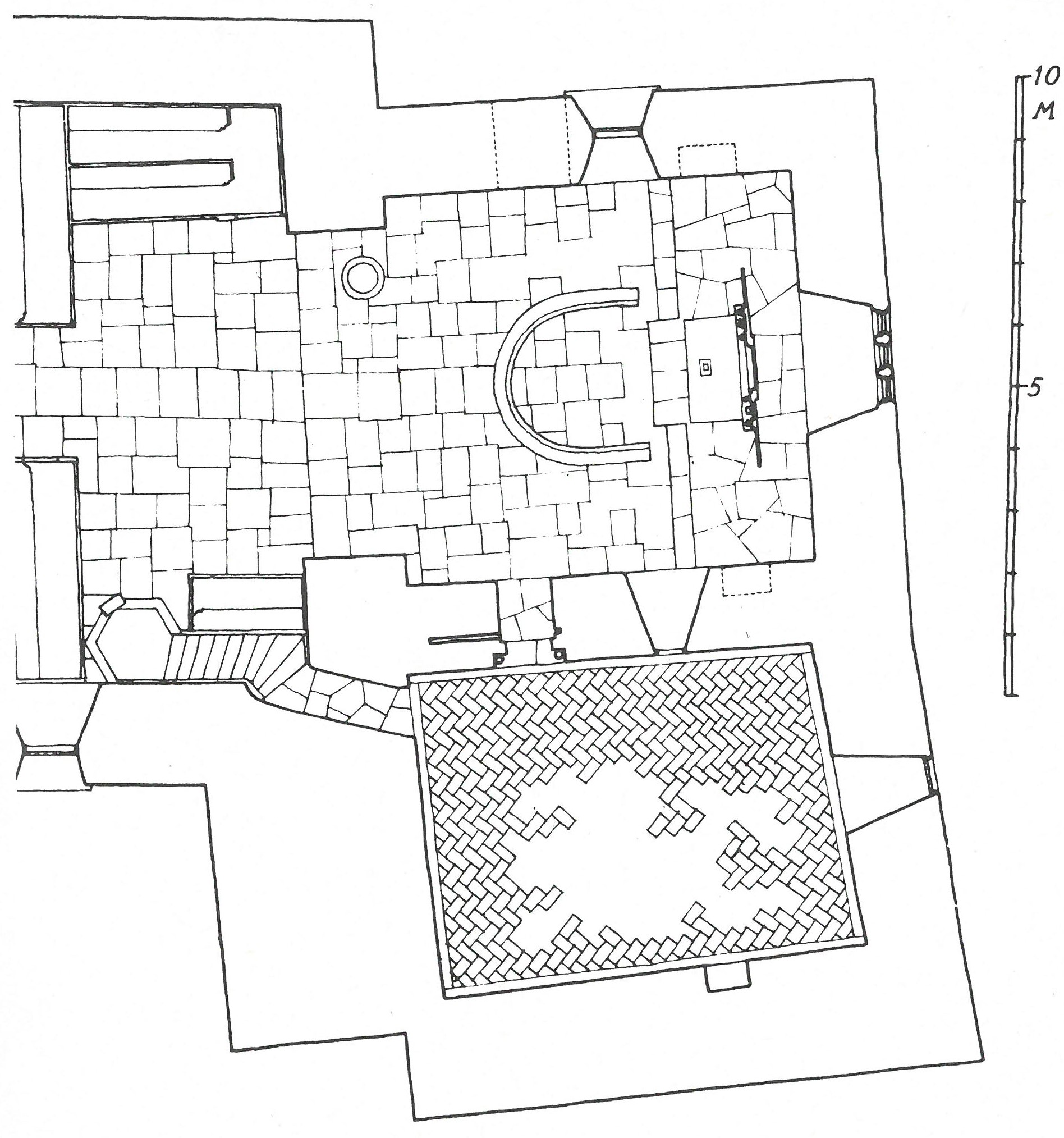

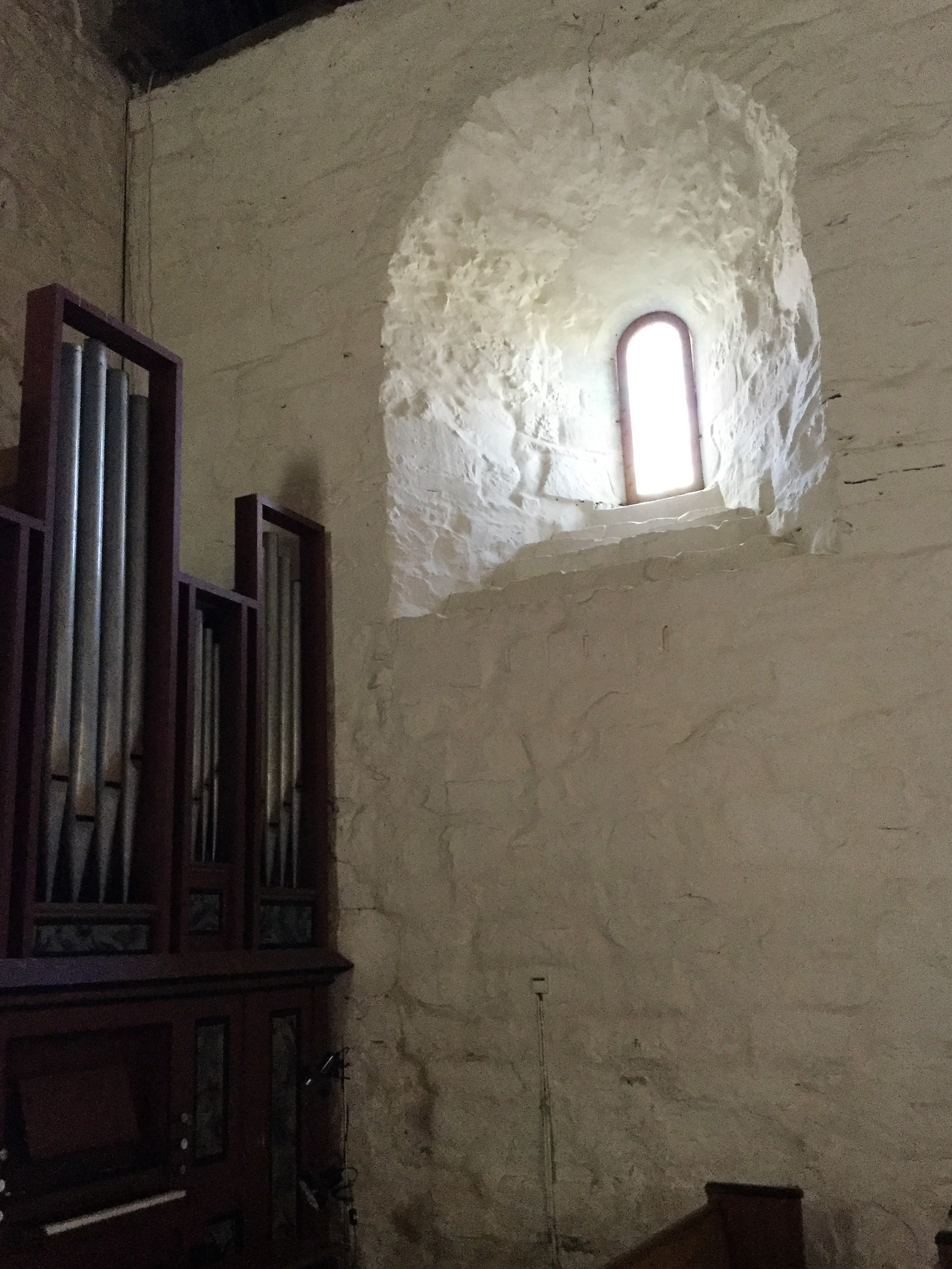

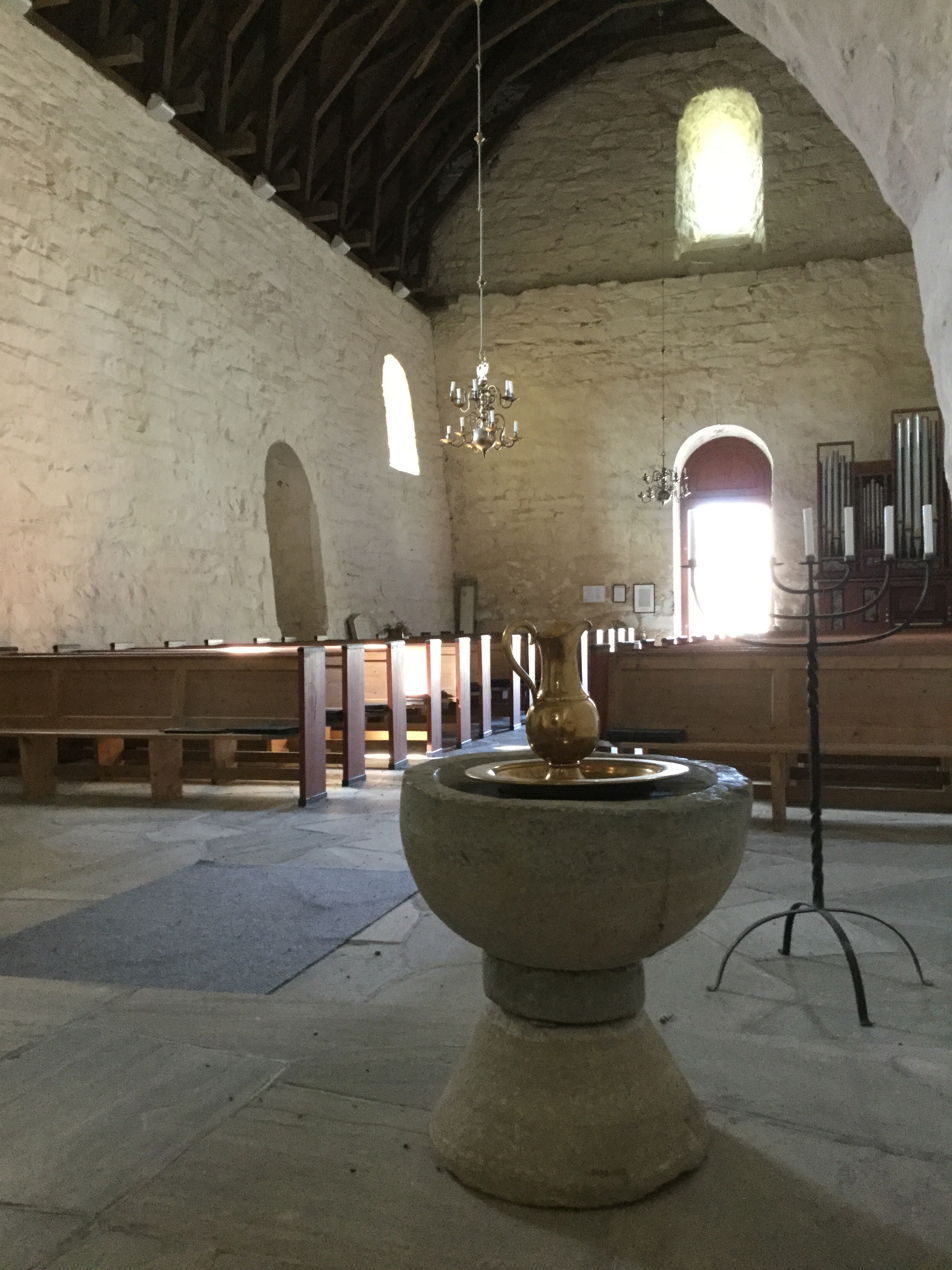

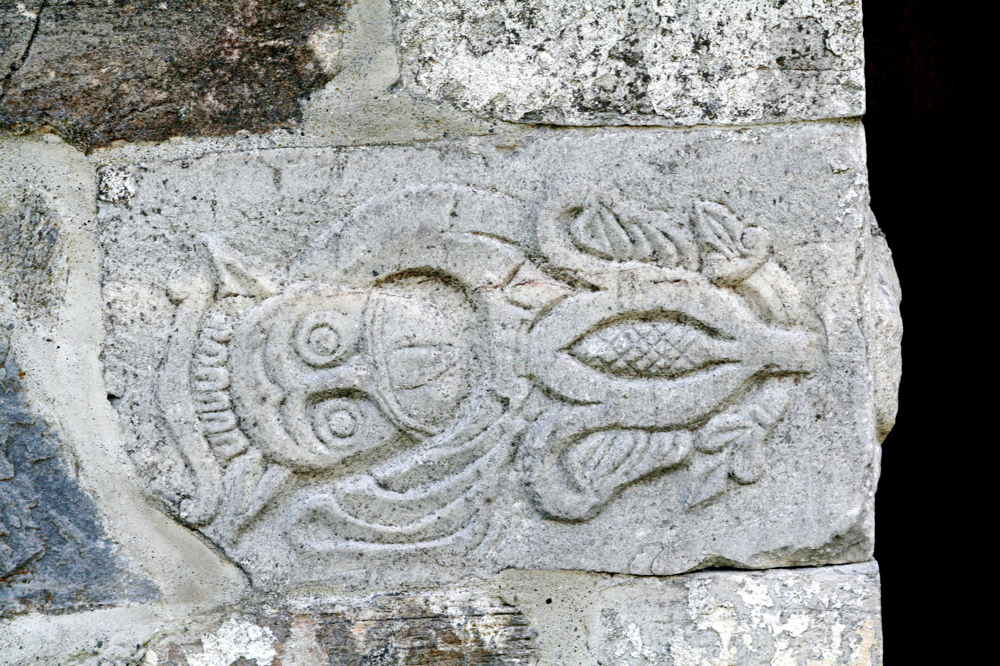

== See also ==
- List of churches in Nidaros
