= Ole Richter =

Norwegian politician

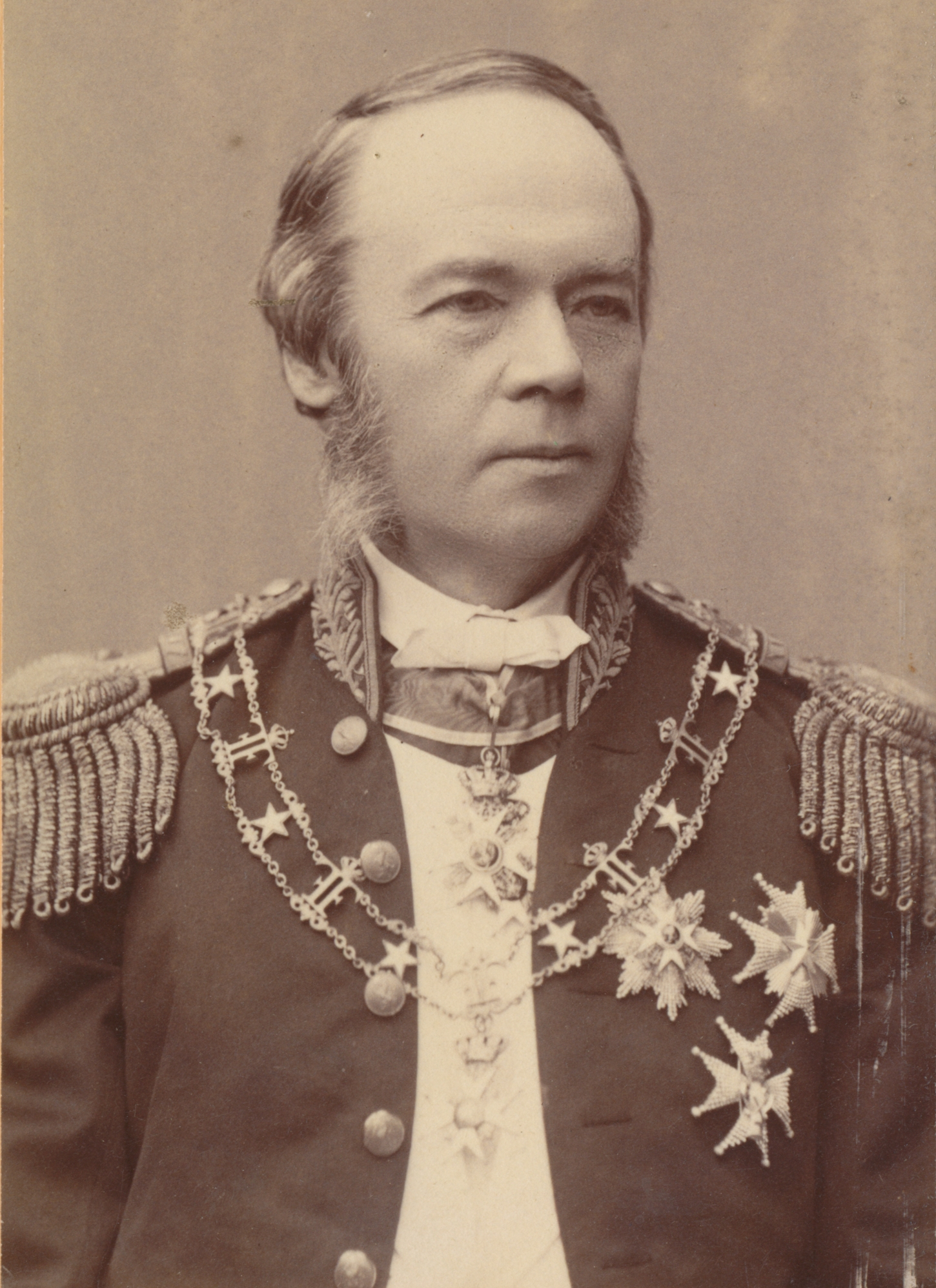
- Ole Richter during his premiership.

Norwegian Prime Minister in Stockholm
- In office 26 June 1884 – 6 June 1888
- Monarch: Oscar II
- Prime Minister: Johan Sverdrup
- Preceded by: Carl Otto Løvenskiold
- Succeeded by: Hans Georg Jacob Stang

Member of the Norwegian Parliament
- In office 1 January 1877 – 31 December 1879
- Constituency: Trondhjem og Levanger
- In office 1 January 1862 – 31 December 1876
- Constituency: Nordre Trondhjems amt

Personal details
- Born: 23 May 1829 Inderøya, Norway
- Died: 15 June 1888 (aged 59) Stockholm, Sweden
- Cause of death: Suicide
- Resting place: Rostad farm
- Party: Liberal Party
- Spouse: Charlotte Wakeford Attree
- Parents: Jørgen Richter (father); Massi Richter (née Rostad) (mother)
- Education: Royal Frederick University
- Occupation: Politician, jurist and diplomat

Ole Jørgensen Richter (23 May 1829 – 15 June 1888) was a Norwegian lawyer, politician, parliamentarian, and the prime minister of the Norwegian Government in Stockholm.

== Early life and education ==
Son of Jørgen and Massi Richter, Ole was born and grew up on the farm Rostad in Inderøya, Nord-Trøndelag. The farm was one of the biggest in the community and had belonged to his mother's family for generations. His father belonged to the family Richter which originated in Saxony. His great-grandfather had come to Norway as a specialist in mining. He married a Norwegian farmer daughter and the family was subsequently involved in farming as well as other businesses. Jørgen Richter ran Rostad farm, had a small brickyard, and did some fishing and boatbuilding. He was involved in local politics and had interest in national politics as well. Both of his parents were religious.

Ole, who was number four of eight children, was educated at home. At the age of 15 in 1845, he moved to live with an uncle in Orkdal Municipality. His uncle was a district magistrate (Norwegian: sorenskriver). He worked at the office and got some education. In 1846, he went to Christiania to take a preliminary exam at the University of Oslo. This was for students who had not studied Greek or Latin. The preliminary exam gave the opportunity to take a lower degree in law which he did in 1847. Feeling that the lower degree would not provide him with adequate career opportunities, he chose the same year to accept an offer by an uncle in Denmark to come and live in order to study to an ordinary examen artium. After two years in Denmark, he passed the examen artium at the University of Oslo in 1849. He subsequently got a cand.jur. degree at the University of Oslo.

== Political career and death ==
Richter was elected to the Storting for the Liberal Party where he became the first Prime Minister in Stockholm after parliamentarianism was introduced, as part of Cabinet Sverdrup in 1884. He was granted royal permission for a family graveyard on his farm Rostad, where he and his family are buried. He committed suicide on 16 June 1888 by shooting himself in his Prime Ministerial office in Stockholm.

== Sources ==
- Fuglum, Per. "Ole Richter". Norsk biografisk leksikon. Store norske leksikon.
- Fuglum, Per (1957). Ole Richter : ungdom og stortingsvirke. Oslo: Universitetsforlaget Press.

Diplomatic posts
Preceded by Theodor Willerding	Consul General of Sweden-Norway in London; 1878–1884	Succeeded by Magnus Björnstjerna
