= Sakshaug Church =

Church in Trøndelag, Norway

- Sakshaug kirke
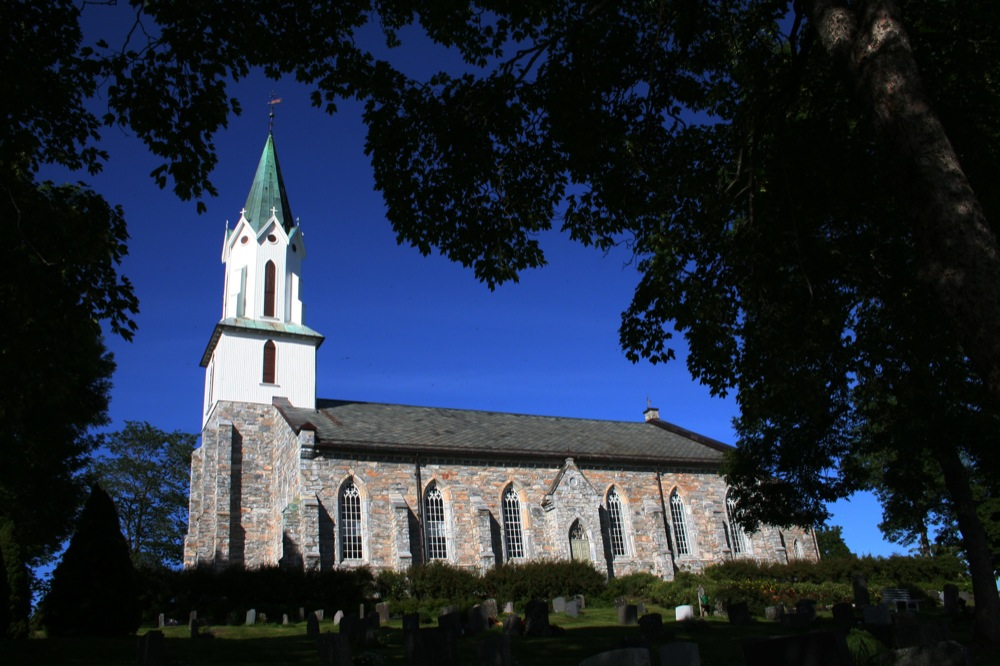
- View of the church
- Sakshaug Church
- 63.871671938°N 11.27608287°E
- Location: Inderøy Municipality, Trøndelag
- Country: Norway
- Denomination: Church of Norway
- Churchmanship: Evangelical Lutheran

History
- Status: Parish church
- Founded: 1871
- Consecrated: 7 Sept 1871

Architecture
- Functional status: Active
- Architect: Håkon Mosling
- Architectural type: Long church
- Style: Neo-Gothic
- Completed: 1871 (155 years ago)

Specifications
- Capacity: 850
- Materials: Stone

Administration
- Diocese: Nidaros bispedømme
- Deanery: Stiklestad prosti
- Parish: Inderøy
- Norwegian Cultural Heritage Site
- Type: Church
- Status: Listed
- ID: 85356

Sakshaug Church (Norwegian: Sakshaug kirke) is a parish church of the Church of Norway in Inderøy Municipality in Trøndelag county, Norway. It is located in the village of Sakshaug, just west of the municipal centre of Straumen. It is the main church for the Inderøy parish which is part of the Stiklestad prosti (deanery) in the Diocese of Nidaros. The large, stone church was built in a Neo-Gothic long church style in 1871 using plans drawn up by the architect Håkon Mosling (1840-1914). The church seats about 850 people.

== History ==
The church was built to replace the medieval Old Sakshaug Church located about 500 metres (1,600 ft) to the northwest of the new church. An increase in the population in the parish and the requirements of the Church Act of 1851 led to the building of the new church. The Church Act required that church buildings have room to hold 30% of the people living in the parish. This meant that the church was too small. The new church was constructed in 1871 and it was consecrated on 7 September 1871. The old church was closed and sold to the Society for the Preservation of Ancient Norwegian Monuments. The new church was designed to hold about 1200 people, but more recently the fire regulations hold 850 as the maximum capacity.

== Media gallery ==
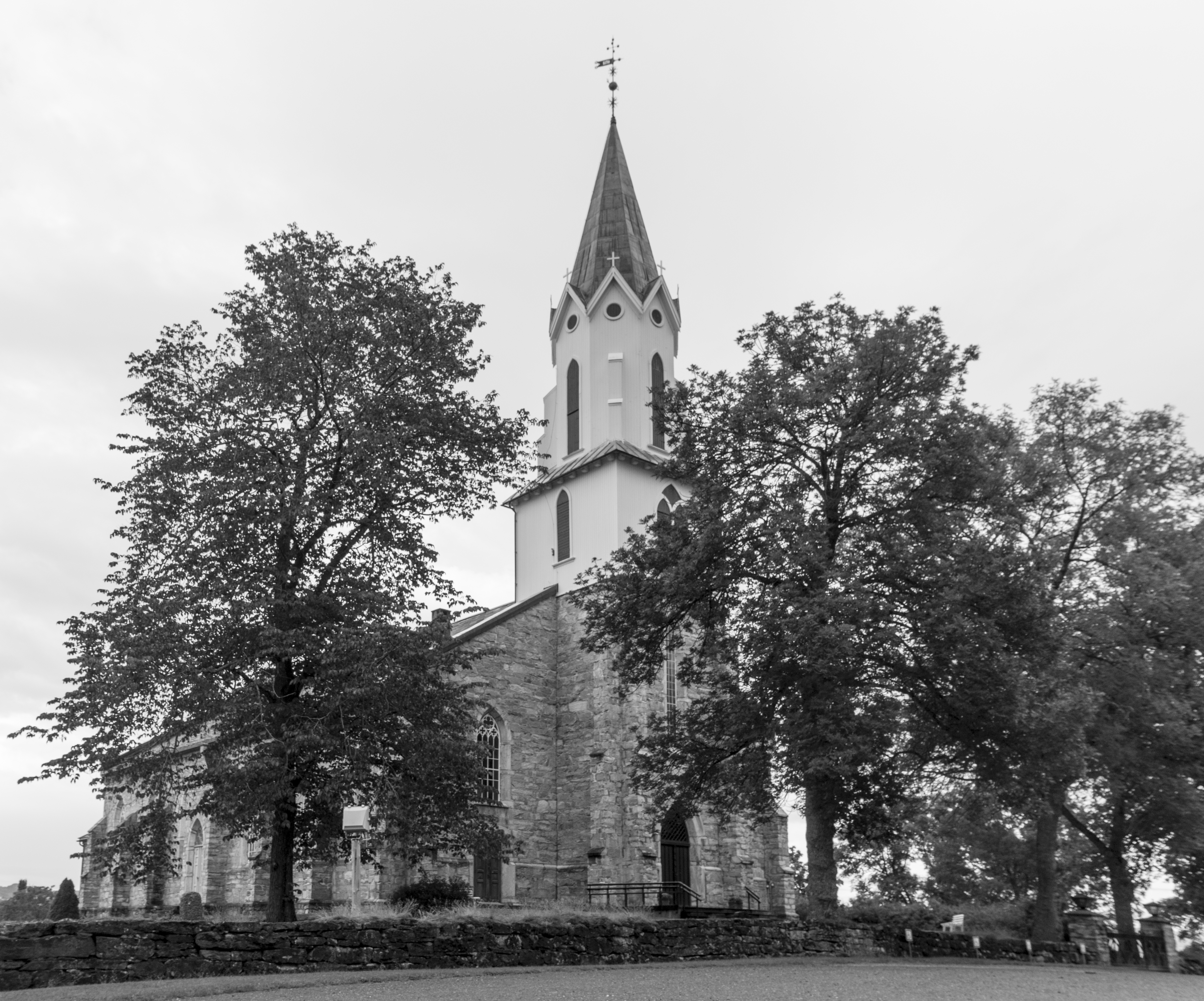

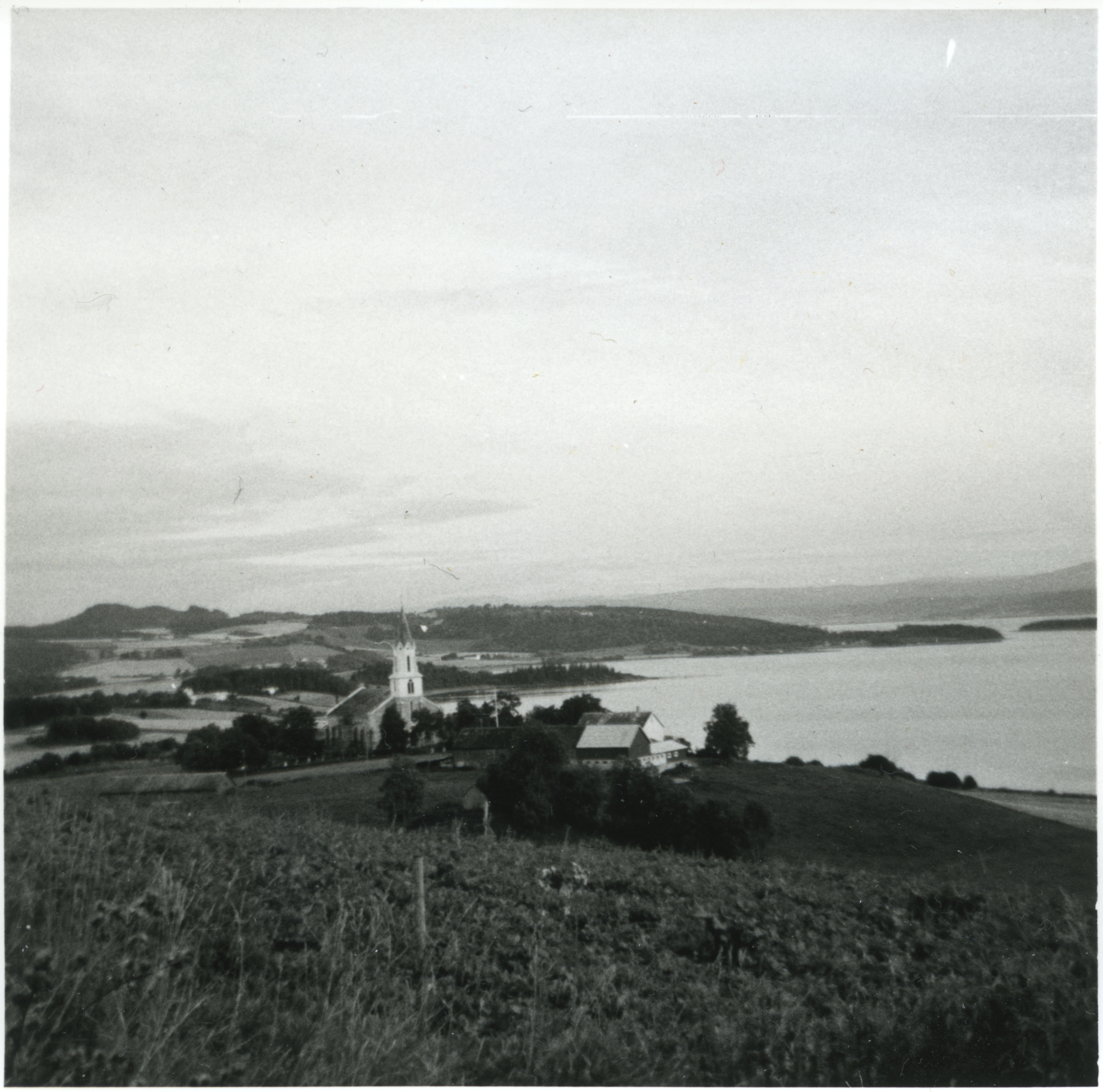

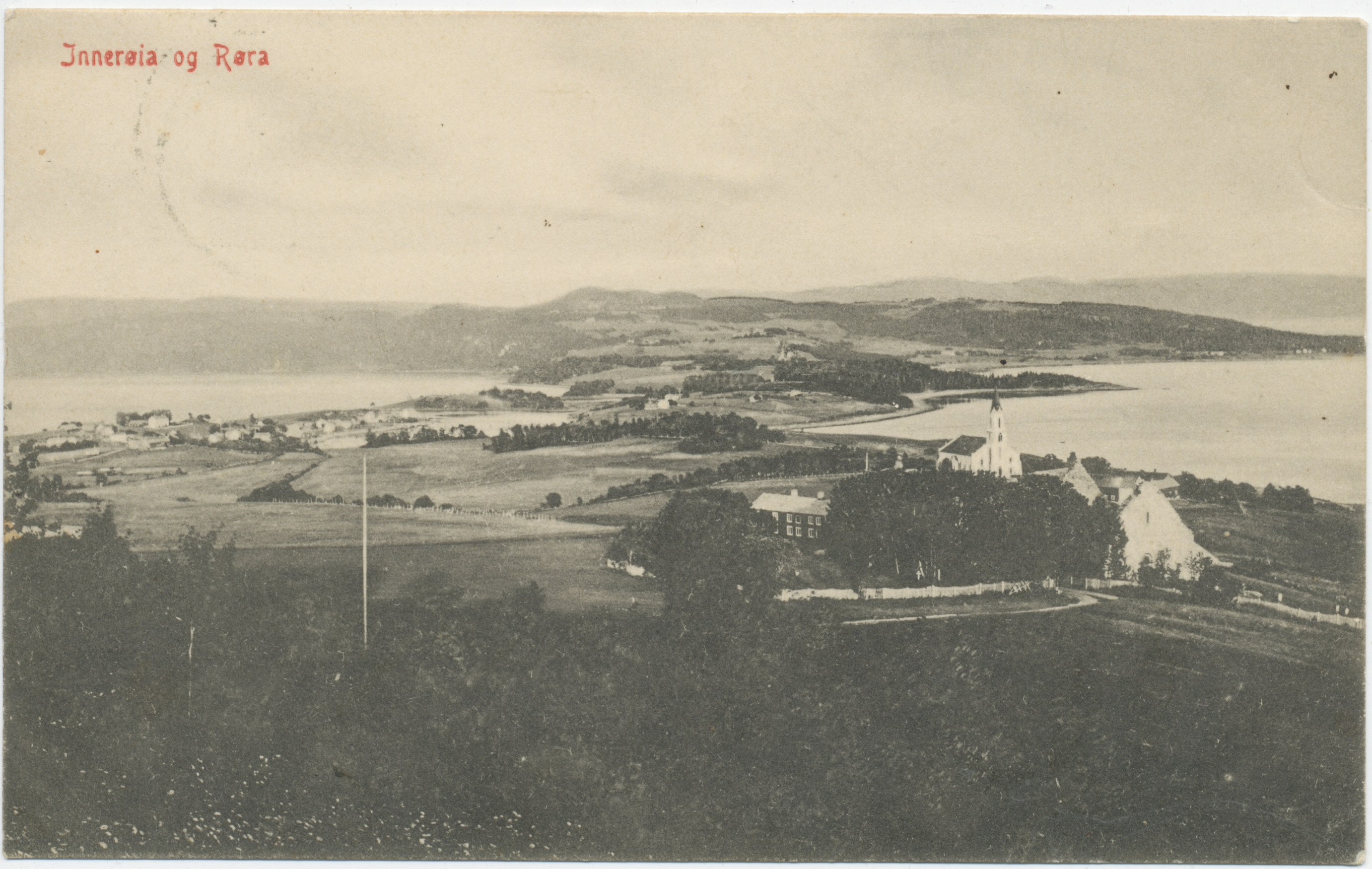

== See also ==
- List of churches in Nidaros
