= Utøy School =

- Utøy skole
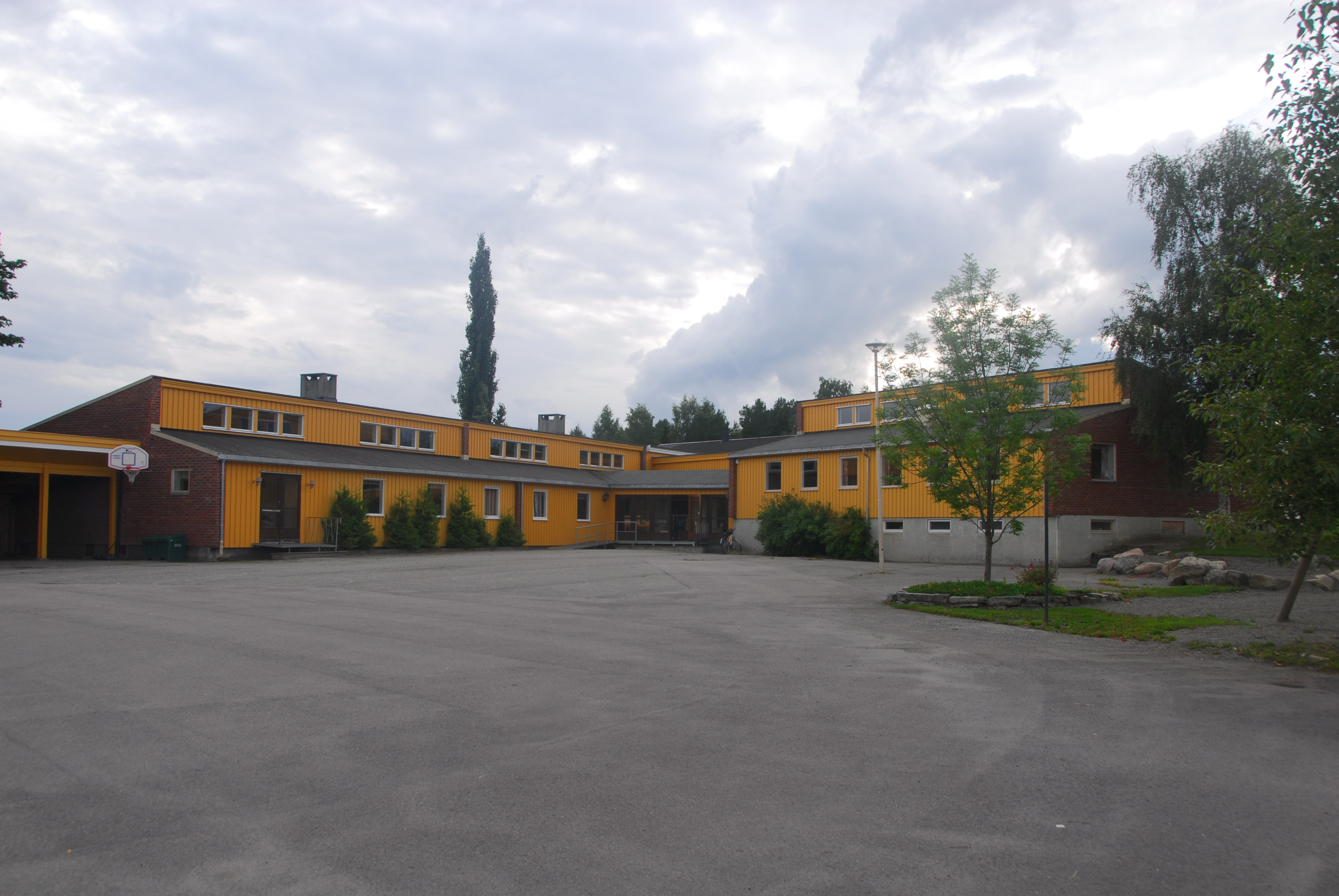
- View of the school

Location
- Utøyvegen 730; 7670 Inderøy; Norway
- Coordinates: 63.8610°N 11.1553°E

Information
- School type: Primary school
- Opened: 12 October 1901
- School district: Inderøy Municipality
- Principal: Bjørg Olsrud
- Grades: 1–7
- Enrollment: 77
- Classrooms: 6
- Campus size: 0.86 hectares (2.1 acres)
- Campus type: Rural
- Budget: 5.1 million kr
- Website: www.utoy-skole.no

Utøy School (Norwegian: Utøy skole) is a primary school serving the Utøy area of Inderøy Municipality in Trøndelag county, Norway. The school offers first through seventh grades, as well as operating the Utøy Kindergarten for children from zero to six years. The school has 77 pupils (2008–09) and the kindergarten has 22 children. The school and kindergarten have 13.9 man-hours of staffing.

== History ==
The school was founded as Jystad School on 12 October 1901. It had 85 pupils who were transferred from the former school districts of Kvam and Leren, following a decision to merge them by the municipal council in 1899. A lot was bought from the farm Jystad nordre and the former school house at Kvam was moved there. The school had two classrooms, a gym, and storage area, which was later converted to another classroom. The school also included two apartments; one for the principal and one for a teacher. The school had agricultural land sufficient for the teachers to hold some animals. The first principal was Adolf Hammer, who worked until 1935.

The name Utøy School was taken into use in 1927. Bjarne Grandhus became principal in 1935. A new barn was opened in 1951, with modern facilities for cattle, hens, and pigs. In 1962, Stokkan School was closed, and the pupils transferred to Utøy. On 22 February 1964, a new building complex was opened. It contained five classrooms. and cost 583,000 kr. Inge Grue became principal in 1965. The lot was extended in 1978 and a new building opened with a crafts room, a gym, and a shooting range. Following the introduction of a new six-year-old first grade, the school was expanded with two new classrooms and expanded teacher offices in 1996.

Since 1 August 2008, the school has had responsibility for Utøy Kindergarten. The kindergarten was established as Knoll og Tott in 1990, but changed its name in 1994 when it was taken over by the municipality and became a full-time kindergarten. This division is located in rented accommodation on the ground floor of Utøy Gospel Hall. It has 22 children and 4.3 man-hours of staff.

== Notable alumni ==
- Ingrid Bolsø Berdal (born 1980), a Norwegian actress
