= Inderøy Municipality =

Municipality in Trøndelag, Norway

Inderøy Municipality Inderøy kommune
- Municipality
- Inderøen herred (historic name)
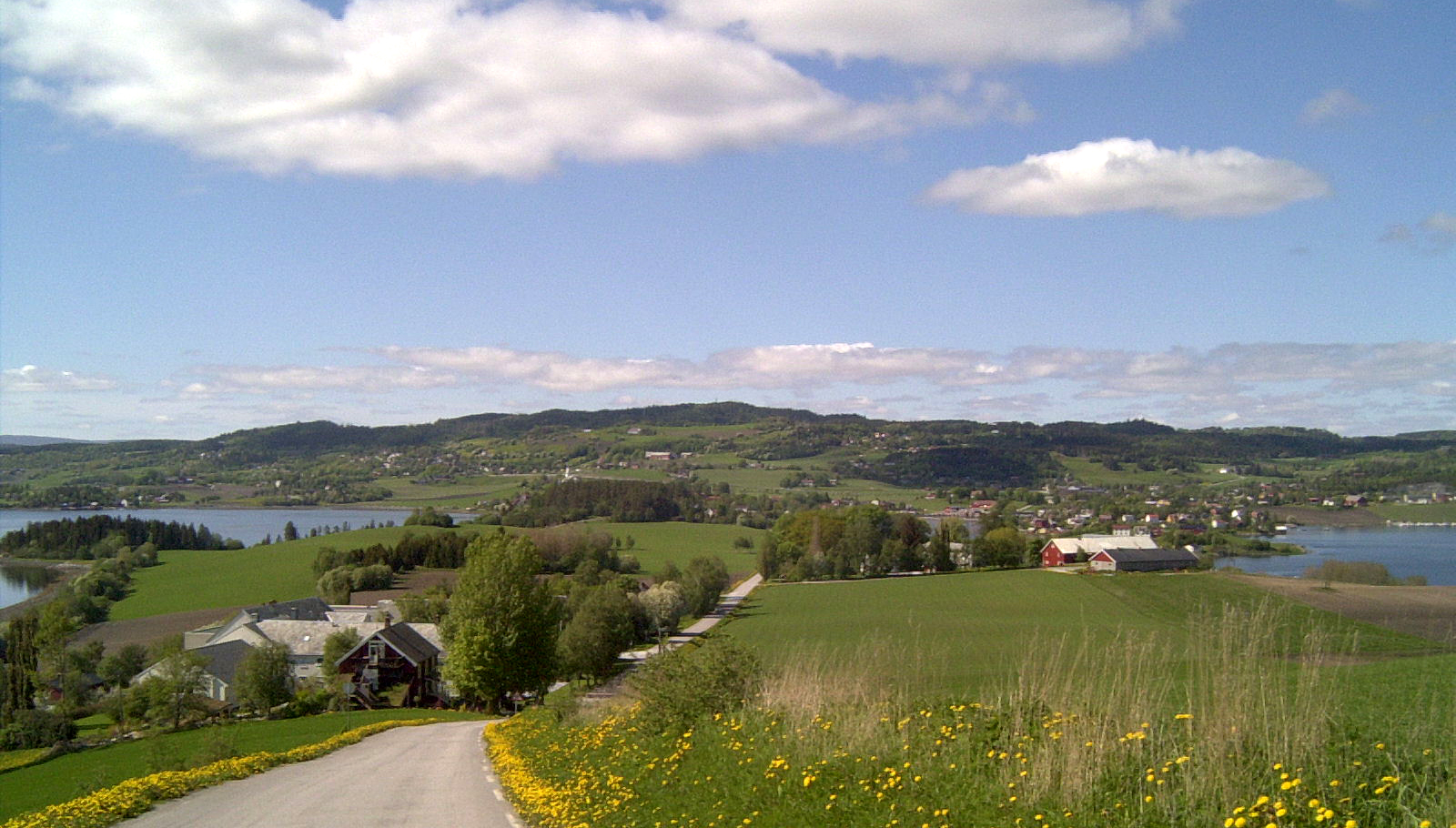

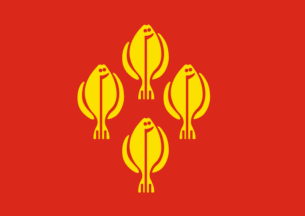
- Flag Coat of arms

- Trøndelag within Norway

- Inderøy within Trøndelag
- Coordinates: 63°53′58″N 11°13′12″E
- Country: Norway
- County: Trøndelag
- District: Innherad
- Established: 1 Jan 1838
  - Created as: Formannskapsdistrikt
- Administrative centre: Straumen

Government
  - Mayor (2023): Unn-Elisabeth Tronstad Kristiansen (Ap)

Area
  - Total: 365.67 km^{2} (141.19 sq mi)
  - Land: 351.16 km^{2} (135.58 sq mi)
  - Water: 14.51 km^{2} (5.60 sq mi) 4%
  - Rank: #247 in Norway
- Highest elevation: 502.45 m (1,648.5 ft)

Population (2024)
  - Total: 6,938
  - Rank: #147 in Norway
  - Density: 19/km^{2} (49/sq mi)
  - Change (10 years): ▲ +3.2%
- Demonym: Inderøyning

Official language
  - Norwegian form: Neutral
- Time zone: UTC+01:00 (CET)
  - Summer (DST): UTC+02:00 (CEST)
- ISO 3166 code: NO-5053
- Website: Official website

Inderøy is a municipality in Trøndelag county, Norway. It is part of the Innherad region. The administrative centre of the municipality is the village of Straumen. Other villages include Framverran, Gangstadhaugen, Hylla, Kjerknesvågen, Kjerringvika, Røra, Sakshaug, Sandvollan, Småland, Trongsundet, Utøya, Vangshylla, and Venneshamn. The municipality is primarily an agricultural community, but also has some industry.

The 366-square-kilometre (141 sq mi) municipality is the 247th largest by area out of the 357 municipalities in Norway. Inderøy Municipality is the 147th most populous municipality in Norway with a population of 6,938. The municipality's population density is 19 inhabitants per square kilometre (49/sq mi) and its population has increased by 3.2% over the previous 10-year period.

== General information ==
The parish of Inderøy was established as a municipality on 1 January 1838 (see formannskapsdistrikt law). On 1 January 1907, the municipality was divided into three municipalities: Røra Municipality (population: 866) in the southeast, Hustad Municipality (population: 732) in the north, and Inderøy Municipality (population: 2,976) in the west. During the 1960s, there were many municipal mergers across Norway due to the work of the Schei Committee. On 1 January 1962, the three neighboring municipalities of Røra Municipality (population: 1,003), Sandvollan Municipality (population: 750), and Inderøy Municipality (population: 3,194) to form a new, larger Inderøy Municipality.

On 1 January 2012, the neighboring Mosvik Municipality was merged into Inderøy. This added about 800 more residents to the municipality, bringing the total population to 6,716 people. On 1 January 2018, the municipality switched from the old Nord-Trøndelag county to the new Trøndelag county.

=== Name ===
The municipality (originally the parish) is named after the Inderøya peninsula (Old Norse: Eynni iðri) since the parish included the whole peninsula. The first element is the definite singular version of the dative case of the word ey which means "island". The last element is iðri which means "inner". The name therefore meant "the inner island", referring to the peninsula which sticks out into the fjord (to contrast with the neighboring Ytterøya island which means "the outer island"). Historically, the name of the municipality was spelled Inderøen. On 3 November 1917, a royal resolution changed the spelling of the name of the municipality to Inderøy.

=== Coat of arms ===
The coat of arms was granted on 5 October 1984. The official blazon is "Gules, four flatfishes Or, one over two over one" (Norwegian: I rødt fire opprette gull flyndrer, 1-2-1). This means the arms have a red field (background) and the charge is four European plaice (a type of flat fish) one over two over one. The fish design has a tincture of Or which means it is commonly colored yellow but if it is made out of metal, then gold is used. This fish design was chosen to symbolize how this type of fish was once plentiful and was one of the main sources of income for the area until around 1940. The arms were designed by Nils Aas. In 2012, the arms were re-approved after the merger of Inderøy and Mosvik Municipality. The old arms of Inderøy were chosen to continue for the new, larger municipality since fishing is still important to the culture and history of the new municipality. The four fish shown on the arms are now said to represent the four original municipalities that now make up Inderøy: Inderøy, Mosvik, Røra, and Sandvollan.

=== Churches ===
The Church of Norway has four parishes (sokn) within Inderøy Municipality. It is part of the Nord-Innherad prosti (deanery) in the Diocese of Nidaros.

Churches in Inderøy Municipality
Parish (sokn)	Church name	Location of the church	Year built
Inderøy	Sakshaug Church	Straumen	1871
Inderøy	Old Sakshaug Church	Sakshaug	c. 1150
Røra	Salberg Church	Røra	1715
Sandvollan	Heggstad Church	Sandvollan	1887
Sandvollan	Hustad Church	Gangstad	c. 1150
Mosvik	Mosvik Church	Mosvik	1884
Mosvik	Vestvik Church	Framverran	1905

== History ==
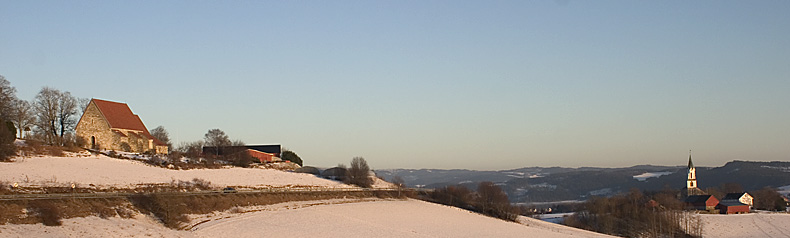
Sakshaug Churches

During the Middle Ages, the Inderøya peninsula was called Eynni iðri, meaning the inner island, which is still the meaning of the word Inderøy. Saurshaug (now Sakshaug) was an important political centre until the 20th century. In the Middle Ages it was the centre of the county Øynafylket (which also included the areas of Beitstad and Verran. The Old Sakshaug Church was opened by Archbishop Eysteinn Erlendsson in 1184 and was the county church. Many of the construction techniques used in the archbishop's cathedral Nidarosdomen in Trondheim were experimented with on Old Sakshaug Church. Also the village of Sandvollan has a church from the Middle Ages, Hustad Church.

During the late Middle Ages and until the breakup of the union between Sweden and Norway Inderøy was the seat of the Governor, Judge, and Tax Collector of Nordre Trondhjems amt, thus it was the county capital of the old Nord-Trøndelag county. Later, the areas lent its name to the Inderøy District Court which formerly had jurisdiction over parts of Trøndelag county.

The area was described by a Norwegian poet, Aasmund Olavsson Vinje, in 1860 who depicted its panorama from Rolsbakken.

== Government ==
Inderøy Municipality is responsible for primary education (through 10th grade), outpatient health services, senior citizen services, welfare and other social services, zoning, economic development, and municipal roads and utilities. The municipality is governed by a municipal council of directly elected representatives. The mayor is indirectly elected by a vote of the municipal council. The municipality is under the jurisdiction of the Trøndelag District Court and the Frostating Court of Appeal.

Inderøy's waste management has since 1985 been carried out by the intermunicipal Innherred Renovasjon. Inderøy became the first municipality in the country to introduce three-container waste sorting at the curbside, in 1994. A new recycling center opened in Utøy in 2018. Since the same year, waste collection has been operated by ReTrans Midt.

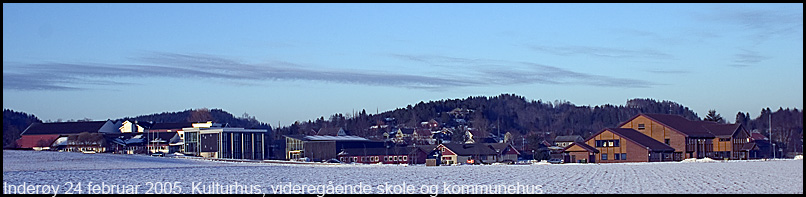
Sakshaug, School, and Administration Center

The administrative centre of Inderøy is Straumen where most of the commercial services are based. Municipal services are located about 1 kilometre (0.62 mi) to the north, at Sakshaug. There are several boroughs in Inderøy: Kjerknesvågen, Mosvik, Røra, Sandvollan, Sakshaug, and Utøy. Each has its own primary school and community centre.

=== Municipal council ===
The municipal council (Kommunestyre) of Inderøy Municipality is made up of 25 representatives that are elected to four-year terms. The tables below show the current and historical composition of the council by political party.

Inderøy kommunestyre 2023–2027
Party name (in Norwegian)	Number of representatives
Labour Party (Arbeiderpartiet)	9
Conservative Party (Høyre)	5
Christian Democratic Party (Kristelig Folkeparti)	1
Centre Party (Senterpartiet)	8
Socialist Left Party (Sosialistisk Venstreparti)	2
Total number of members:	25

Inderøy kommunestyre 2019–2023
Party name (in Norwegian)	Number of representatives
Labour Party (Arbeiderpartiet)	7
Green Party (Miljøpartiet De Grønne)	1
Conservative Party (Høyre)	3
Christian Democratic Party (Kristelig Folkeparti)	1
Centre Party (Senterpartiet)	11
Socialist Left Party (Sosialistisk Venstreparti)	2
Total number of members:	25

Inderøy kommunestyre 2015–2019
Party name (in Norwegian)	Number of representatives
Labour Party (Arbeiderpartiet)	9
Green Party (Miljøpartiet De Grønne)	1
Conservative Party (Høyre)	2
Christian Democratic Party (Kristelig Folkeparti)	1
Centre Party (Senterpartiet)	15
Socialist Left Party (Sosialistisk Venstreparti)	2
Liberal Party (Venstre)	1
Total number of members:	31

Inderøy kommunestyre 2011–2015
Party name (in Norwegian)	Number of representatives
Labour Party (Arbeiderpartiet)	10
Progress Party (Fremskrittspartiet)	1
Conservative Party (Høyre)	3
Christian Democratic Party (Kristelig Folkeparti)	1
Centre Party (Senterpartiet)	13
Socialist Left Party (Sosialistisk Venstreparti)	2
Liberal Party (Venstre)	1
Total number of members:	31

Inderøy kommunestyre 2007–2011
Party name (in Norwegian)	Number of representatives
Labour Party (Arbeiderpartiet)	7
Progress Party (Fremskrittspartiet)	2
Conservative Party (Høyre)	3
Christian Democratic Party (Kristelig Folkeparti)	1
Centre Party (Senterpartiet)	11
Socialist Left Party (Sosialistisk Venstreparti)	2
Liberal Party (Venstre)	1
Total number of members:	27

Inderøy kommunestyre 2003–2007
Party name (in Norwegian)	Number of representatives
Labour Party (Arbeiderpartiet)	10
Progress Party (Fremskrittspartiet)	1
Conservative Party (Høyre)	3
Christian Democratic Party (Kristelig Folkeparti)	1
Centre Party (Senterpartiet)	7
Socialist Left Party (Sosialistisk Venstreparti)	3
Liberal Party (Venstre)	2
Total number of members:	27

Inderøy kommunestyre 1999–2003
Party name (in Norwegian)	Number of representatives
Labour Party (Arbeiderpartiet)	11
Conservative Party (Høyre)	3
Christian Democratic Party (Kristelig Folkeparti)	2
Centre Party (Senterpartiet)	11
Socialist Left Party (Sosialistisk Venstreparti)	3
Liberal Party (Venstre)	1
Total number of members:	31

Inderøy kommunestyre 1995–1999
Party name (in Norwegian)	Number of representatives
Labour Party (Arbeiderpartiet)	12
Conservative Party (Høyre)	2
Christian Democratic Party (Kristelig Folkeparti)	1
Centre Party (Senterpartiet)	12
Socialist Left Party (Sosialistisk Venstreparti)	3
Liberal Party (Venstre)	1
Total number of members:	31

Inderøy kommunestyre 1991–1995
Party name (in Norwegian)	Number of representatives
Labour Party (Arbeiderpartiet)	12
Conservative Party (Høyre)	2
Christian Democratic Party (Kristelig Folkeparti)	1
Centre Party (Senterpartiet)	11
Socialist Left Party (Sosialistisk Venstreparti)	4
Liberal Party (Venstre)	1
Total number of members:	31

Inderøy kommunestyre 1987–1991
Party name (in Norwegian)	Number of representatives
Labour Party (Arbeiderpartiet)	14
Conservative Party (Høyre)	2
Christian Democratic Party (Kristelig Folkeparti)	1
Centre Party (Senterpartiet)	10
Socialist Left Party (Sosialistisk Venstreparti)	2
Liberal Party (Venstre)	2
Total number of members:	31

Inderøy kommunestyre 1983–1987
Party name (in Norwegian)	Number of representatives
Labour Party (Arbeiderpartiet)	13
Conservative Party (Høyre)	2
Christian Democratic Party (Kristelig Folkeparti)	1
Centre Party (Senterpartiet)	9
Socialist Left Party (Sosialistisk Venstreparti)	2
Liberal Party (Venstre)	2
Total number of members:	29

Inderøy kommunestyre 1979–1983
Party name (in Norwegian)	Number of representatives
Labour Party (Arbeiderpartiet)	13
Conservative Party (Høyre)	2
Christian Democratic Party (Kristelig Folkeparti)	1
Centre Party (Senterpartiet)	9
Liberal Party (Venstre)	4
Total number of members:	29

Inderøy kommunestyre 1975–1979
Party name (in Norwegian)	Number of representatives
Labour Party (Arbeiderpartiet)	14
Conservative Party (Høyre)	1
Christian Democratic Party (Kristelig Folkeparti)	1
Centre Party (Senterpartiet)	10
Liberal Party (Venstre)	3
Total number of members:	29

Inderøy kommunestyre 1971–1975
Party name (in Norwegian)	Number of representatives
Labour Party (Arbeiderpartiet)	15
Conservative Party (Høyre)	1
Christian Democratic Party (Kristelig Folkeparti)	1
Centre Party (Senterpartiet)	10
Liberal Party (Venstre)	2
Total number of members:	29

Inderøy kommunestyre 1967–1971
Party name (in Norwegian)	Number of representatives
Labour Party (Arbeiderpartiet)	14
Christian Democratic Party (Kristelig Folkeparti)	1
Centre Party (Senterpartiet)	11
Liberal Party (Venstre)	3
Total number of members:	29

Inderøy kommunestyre 1963–1967
Party name (in Norwegian)	Number of representatives
Labour Party (Arbeiderpartiet)	15
Christian Democratic Party (Kristelig Folkeparti)	1
Centre Party (Senterpartiet)	11
Liberal Party (Venstre)	2
Total number of members:	29

Inderøy herredsstyre 1959–1963
Party name (in Norwegian)	Number of representatives
Labour Party (Arbeiderpartiet)	12
Christian Democratic Party (Kristelig Folkeparti)	1
Centre Party (Senterpartiet)	10
Liberal Party (Venstre)	2
Total number of members:	25

Inderøy herredsstyre 1955–1959
Party name (in Norwegian)	Number of representatives
Labour Party (Arbeiderpartiet)	12
Farmers' Party (Bondepartiet)	10
Liberal Party (Venstre)	3
Total number of members:	25

Inderøy herredsstyre 1951–1955
Party name (in Norwegian)	Number of representatives
Labour Party (Arbeiderpartiet)	11
Farmers' Party (Bondepartiet)	10
Liberal Party (Venstre)	3
Total number of members:	24

Inderøy herredsstyre 1947–1951
Party name (in Norwegian)	Number of representatives
Labour Party (Arbeiderpartiet)	11
Farmers' Party (Bondepartiet)	10
Liberal Party (Venstre)	3
Total number of members:	24

Inderøy herredsstyre 1945–1947
Party name (in Norwegian)	Number of representatives
Labour Party (Arbeiderpartiet)	12
Farmers' Party (Bondepartiet)	9
Liberal Party (Venstre)	3
Total number of members:	24

Inderøy herredsstyre 1937–1941*
Party name (in Norwegian)	Number of representatives
Labour Party (Arbeiderpartiet)	10
Farmers' Party (Bondepartiet)	11
Liberal Party (Venstre)	3
Total number of members:	24
Note: Due to the German occupation of Norway during World War II, no elections were held for new municipal councils until after the war ended in 1945.

=== Mayors ===
The mayor (Norwegian: ordfører) of Inderøy Municipality is the political leader of the municipality and the chairperson of the municipal council. Here is a list of people who have held this position:

- 1838–1843: Lorents Oxaal
- 1843–1849: Lorents D. Muus
- 1849–1853: Jørgen Buck
- 1854–1861: Herman Løchen
- 1862–1863: Sivert Bragstad
- 1864–1875: Ole Richter
- 1876–1885: Peter Hægstad
- 1886–1889: J.C. Tiller (V)
- 1890–1891: Ole Braa (V)
- 1892–1895: J.C. Tiller (V)
- 1896–1904: Ole Braa (V)
- 1905–1916: Ole Haugum (V)
- 1917–1919: Hans Melhus (V)
- 1920–1922: Ole Haugum (V)
- 1923–1925: Hans Melhus (Bp)
- 1926–1927: John Snerting (V)
- 1927–1929: Hans Hjulstad (Bp)
- 1930–1931: Olaf Ulstad (Bp)
- 1932–1934: John Snerting (V)
- 1935–1937: Olaf Ulstad (Bp)
- 1938–1938: Hans Hjulstad (Bp)
- 1938–1945: Anders Haugum V/NS)
- 1945–1945: Bjarne Lyngstad (V)
- 1946–1947: Paul Hjulstad (Ap)
- 1948–1951: Bjarne Lyngstad (V)
- 1952–1957: Hans Melhus (Bp)
- 1958–1959: Bjarne Lyngstad (V)
- 1959–1959: Hans Melhus (Bp)
- 1960–1961: Trygve Wang (Sp)
- 1962–1967: Kåre Sjøvold (Ap)
- 1968–1971: Olav Andreas Moen (Sp)
- 1972–1975: Kåre Sjøvold (Ap)
- 1976–1983: Anders Lyngstad (Sp)
- 1984–1987: Kåre Sjøvold (Ap)
- 1988–1990: Arild Vist (Ap)
- 1990–1995: Karin Kjølmoen (Ap)
- 1995–2003: Ole Tronstad (Sp)
- 2003–2007: Svein Jørum (Ap)
- 2007–2011: Ole Tronstad (Sp)
- 2011–2023: Ida Stuberg (Sp)
- 2023–present: Unn-Elisabeth Tronstad Kristiansen (Ap)

== Economy ==
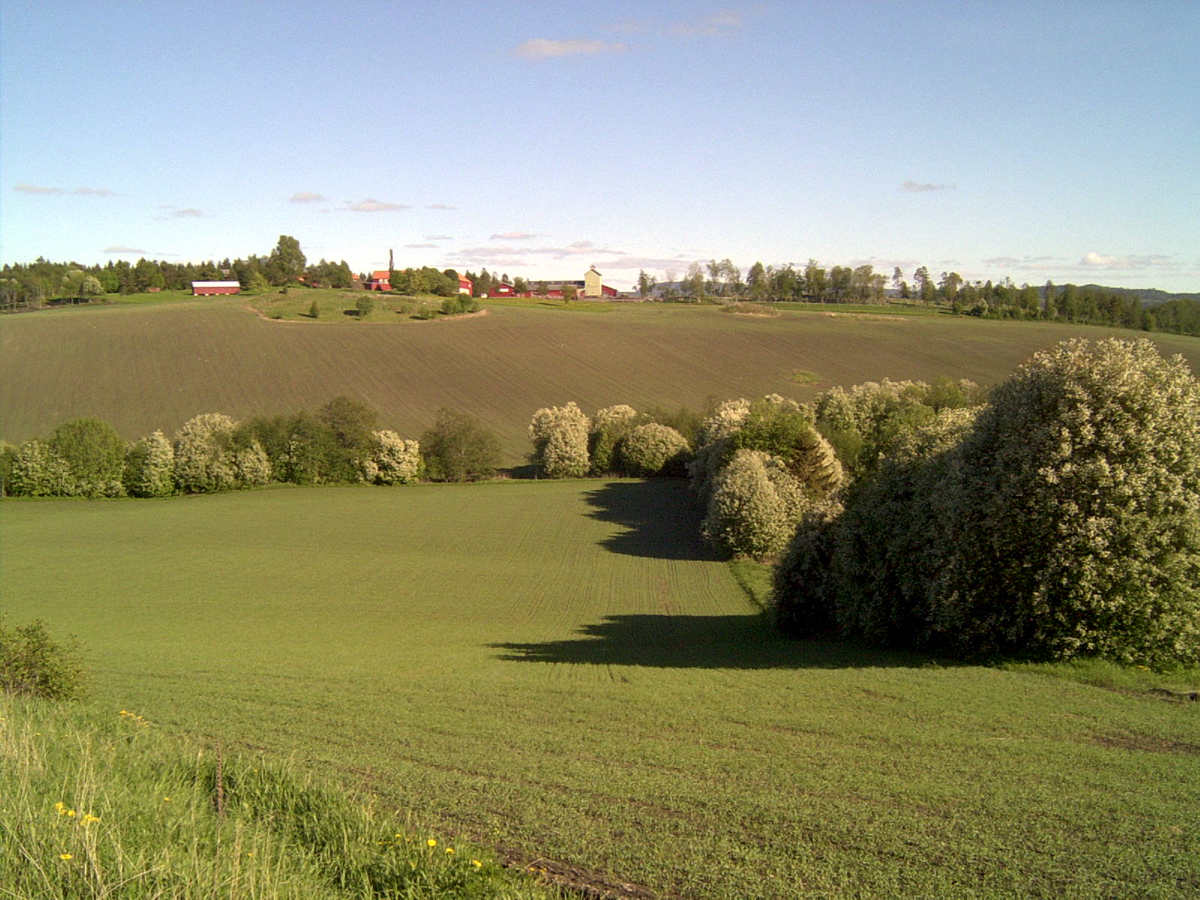
Inderøy is mostly made up by lowland well suited for agriculture

Inderøy is primarily an agricultural area. Most of the municipality is cultivated, with grass and grains being the most common crops, but strawberries are also common. Most farmers also have forests. All dominant industry is oriented around agriculture, with factories producing distillery products (Sundnes Brenneri), animal feed, flat bread, jam, and juice (Røra Fabrikker), chickens, and other meat products. In addition there are numerous farms who manufacture their own produce and sell it on the farm.

There are also a number of service institutions in Inderøy, including stores, public services, and schools (including Utøy School). Quite a lot of people work in the neighboring municipalities of Levanger, Steinkjer, and Verdal, with Inderøy Municipality being a suburb of those.

== Geography ==
Inderøy Municipality is located on two peninsulas (Fosen and Inderøya) in the inner sections of the Trondheimsfjord, bordering Indre Fosen Municipality to the southwest, Levanger Municipality to the southeast (across the fjord), Steinkjer Municipality to the northeast, and Verdal Municipality to the southeast. The Skarnsundet strait lies between the Inderøya and Fosen peninsulas in the center of the municipality, and it connects the main Trondheimsfjord with the inner Beitstadfjorden. The lake Meltingvatnet lies along the border with Indre Fosen Municipality in the southern part of the municipality. The highest point in the municipality is the 502.45-metre (1,648.5 ft) tall mountain Storknuken.

== Transportation ==
The Nordland Line runs through Røra, and Røra Station is served hourly or more often by the Trøndelag Commuter Rail. European route E6 also runs through Røra. It connects to Norwegian National Road 755 that runs through Sakshaug and onwards to Utøya and Mosvik. At Straumen, the road crosses the preserved Straumen Bridge and the Skarnsund Bridge. National Road 761 runs from Sakshaug north through Sandvollan before intersecting with E6 south of Steinkjer. There is a limited bus service provided by TrønderBilene.

== Culture ==
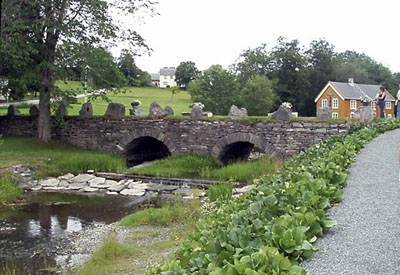
Muustrø Park, Inderøy

There are a number of cultural activities in Inderøy. The Inderøy Upper Secondary School has a music, dance, and drama line, and the county's music service is also located in Straumen. Quite a number of local activities are oriented around culture, including the annual jazz festival Soddjazz. There is also a gallery, Nils Aas Kunstverksted and numerous small artist workshops. The newspaper Inderøyningen is published in Straumen and covers the municipality.

=== Attractions ===
Most tourist attractions are connected to The Golden Detour. Among these are local farms and a distillery that sell locally produced foods and beverages, as well as artist workshops and a fishing centre.

== Notable people ==
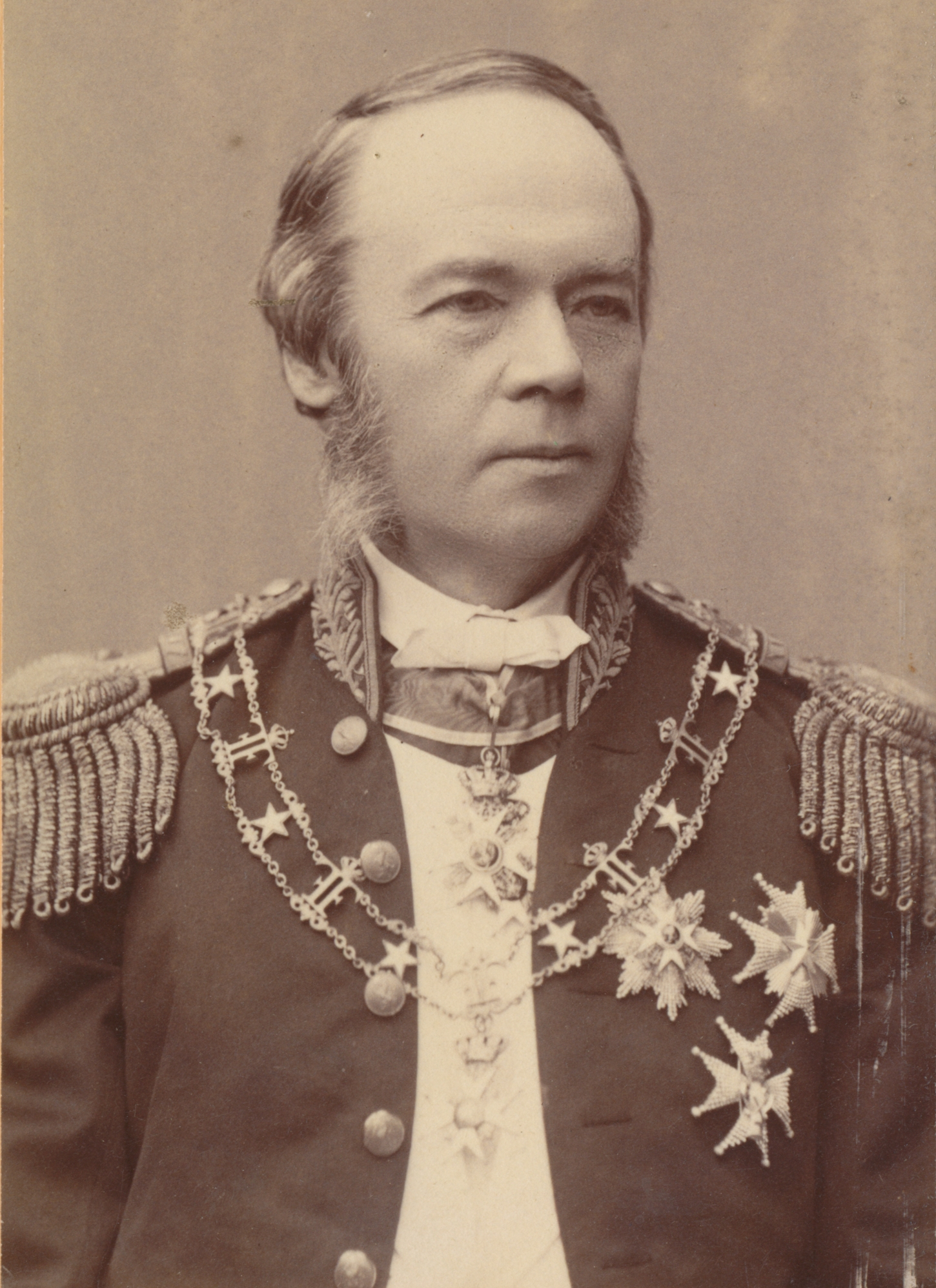
Ole Richter

=== Public Service & public thinking ===
- Ole Richter (1829 in Inderøya – 1888), a lawyer, politician, and Prime Minister of Norway from 1884-1888
- Christian Leden (1882 in Inderøy – 1957), an Arctic explorer, scientist and composer
- Bjarne Lyngstad (1901 in Inderøy – 1971), a Norwegian politician and Mayor of Inderøy from 1947-1952
- Albert Lange Fliflet (1908 in Inderøy – 2001), a philologist and translator, translated Kalevala
- Inger Lise Gjørv (1938–2009), a politician and County Governor of Nord-Trøndelag; lived in Sandvollan
- Karin Kjølmoen (born 1946 in Steinkjer), a Norwegian politician and Mayor of Inderøy from 1990-1995

=== The Arts ===
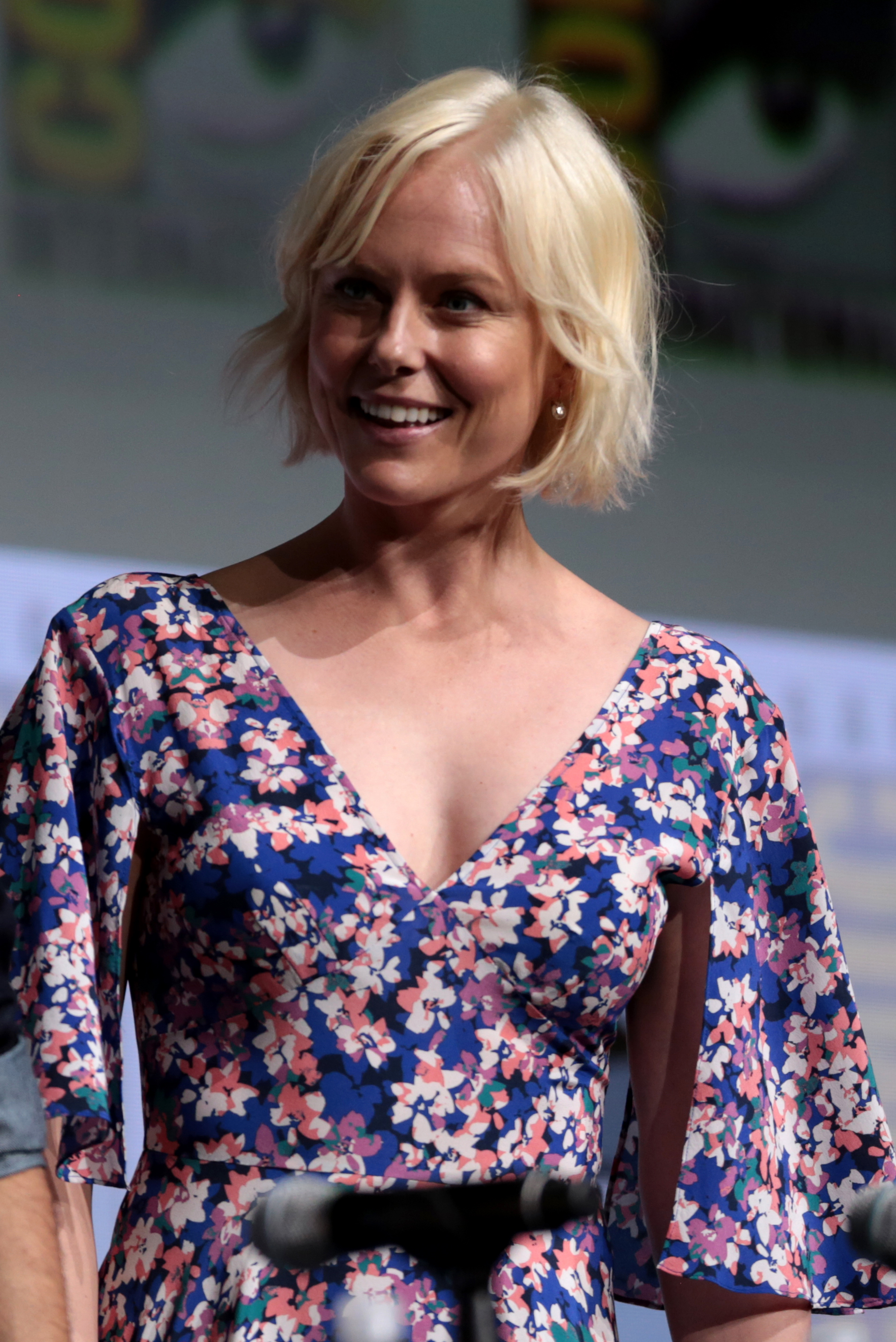
Ingrid Bolso Berdal, 2017

- Olaug Løken (1854 at Sundnes – 1925), a Norwegian writer and women's rights activist
- Håkon Løken (1859 in Inderøy – 1923), a journalist, lawyer, editor, and non-fiction writer
- Johannes B. Wist (1864 at Sund – 1923), a Norwegian American journalist and author
- Gudrun Løchen Drewsen (1867 in Inderøy – 1946), an American women's rights activist and painter
- Nils Aas (1933 in Inderøy – 2004), a Norwegian sculptor and artist
- Per Egil Hegge (born 1940), a journalist and former editor of Aftenposten; brought up in Inderøy
- Hanne Aga (1947 in Røra − 2019), a Norwegian poet
- Jon Øivind Ness (born 1968), a Norwegian contemporary composer
- Ingrid Bolsø Berdal (born 1980 in Utøy), a Norwegian actress

=== Sport ===
- Ivar Ramstad (1924 in Inderøy – 2009), a Norwegian discus thrower who competed at the 1948 Summer Olympics
- Lorns Skjemstad (born 1940 in Inderøy), a retired Norwegian cross-country skier who competed in the 1968 Winter Olympics

and
