= Inderøya =

Peninsula in Inderøy, Norway

- Peninsula
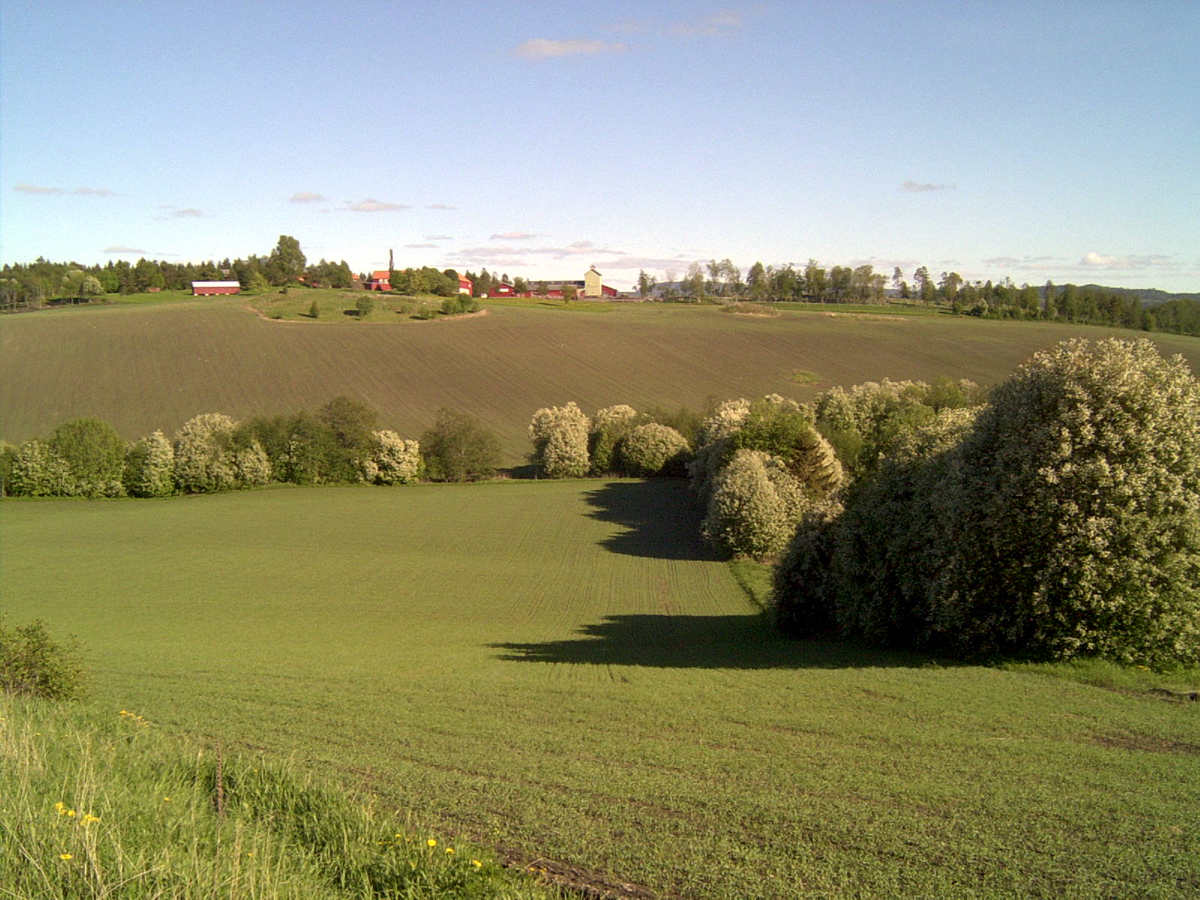
- View of Gjørv
- Interactive map of the peninsula
- Coordinates: 63.8812°N 11.1309°E
- Location: Trøndelag, Norway
- Offshore water bodies: Trondheimsfjorden, Børgin

Inderøya is a peninsula in the Trondheimsfjord in Trøndelag county, Norway. The peninsula constitutes part of Inderøy Municipality (which is named after the peninsula). The peninsula borders the Beitstadfjorden to the north, the Børgin fjord to the east, the Skarnsundet strait to the west, and the Trondheimsfjord to the south. It is connected to the mainland via a narrow strip of land to the northeast.

Until 2011, Inderøy Municipality was made up of this peninsula plus the Røra area, but since 2012, Inderøy Municipality has also included all of the old Mosvik Municipality, a larger peninsula on the west side of Skarnsundet strait.
