= Vestvik Church =

Church in Trøndelag, Norway

- Vestvik kirke / Framverran kirke
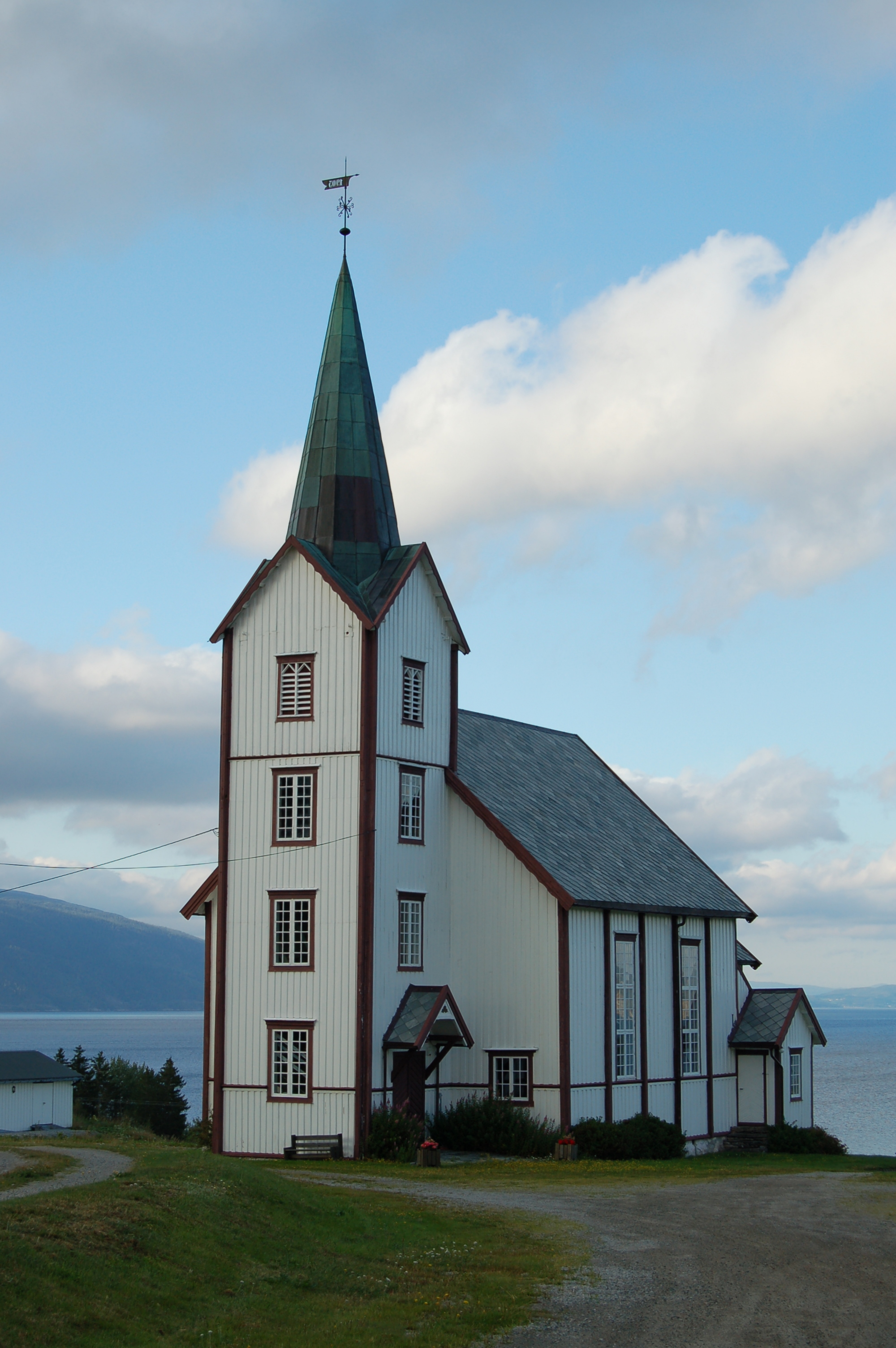
- View of the church
- Vestvik Church
- 63.89310087°N 10.96850576°E
- Location: Inderøy Municipality, Trøndelag
- Country: Norway
- Denomination: Church of Norway
- Churchmanship: Evangelical Lutheran

History
- Status: Parish church
- Founded: 13th century
- Consecrated: 3 Nov 1905

Architecture
- Functional status: Active
- Architect: Jon Rostad
- Architectural type: Long church
- Completed: 1905 (121 years ago)

Specifications
- Capacity: 275
- Materials: Wood

Administration
- Diocese: Nidaros bispedømme
- Deanery: Stiklestad prosti
- Parish: Mosvik
- Norwegian Cultural Heritage Site
- Type: Church
- Status: Automatically protected
- ID: 85823

Vestvik Church (Norwegian: Vestvik kirke) is a parish church of the Church of Norway in Inderøy Municipality in Trøndelag county, Norway. It is located in the village of Framverran. It is one of the two churches for the Mosvik parish which is part of the Stiklestad prosti (deanery) in the Diocese of Nidaros. The white, wooden church was built in a long church style using plans drawn up by the architect Jon Rostad. The church seats about 275 people.

== History ==
The earliest existing historical records of the church date back to the year 1533, but it was much older than that. The first church was likely a stave church and it was located about 90 metres (300 ft) southwest of the present church site. The baptismal font in the church has been dated to around the year 1250, so it is likely that the church was founded around that time. Not much is known about the old church.

The old church was torn down in 1823 and a new church was constructed on the same site over the next year. The new building was a long church and it was consecrated in 1825. It is not known who designed the building, but it may have been the owner of the church, Jon Rostad. The church was only in use for about 80 years because soon after its construction, the soft clay soil led to instability in the foundation. A royal resolution from 22 October 1904 gave permission to tear down the old church and rebuild it on a new site about 90 metres (300 ft) to the northeast. The new wooden church was constructed in 1905 in a long church style using materials from the previous church building. The new church was designed to look just like the previous church building and Ole Røising was the lead builder. The church was consecrated on 3 November 1905.

== Media gallery ==
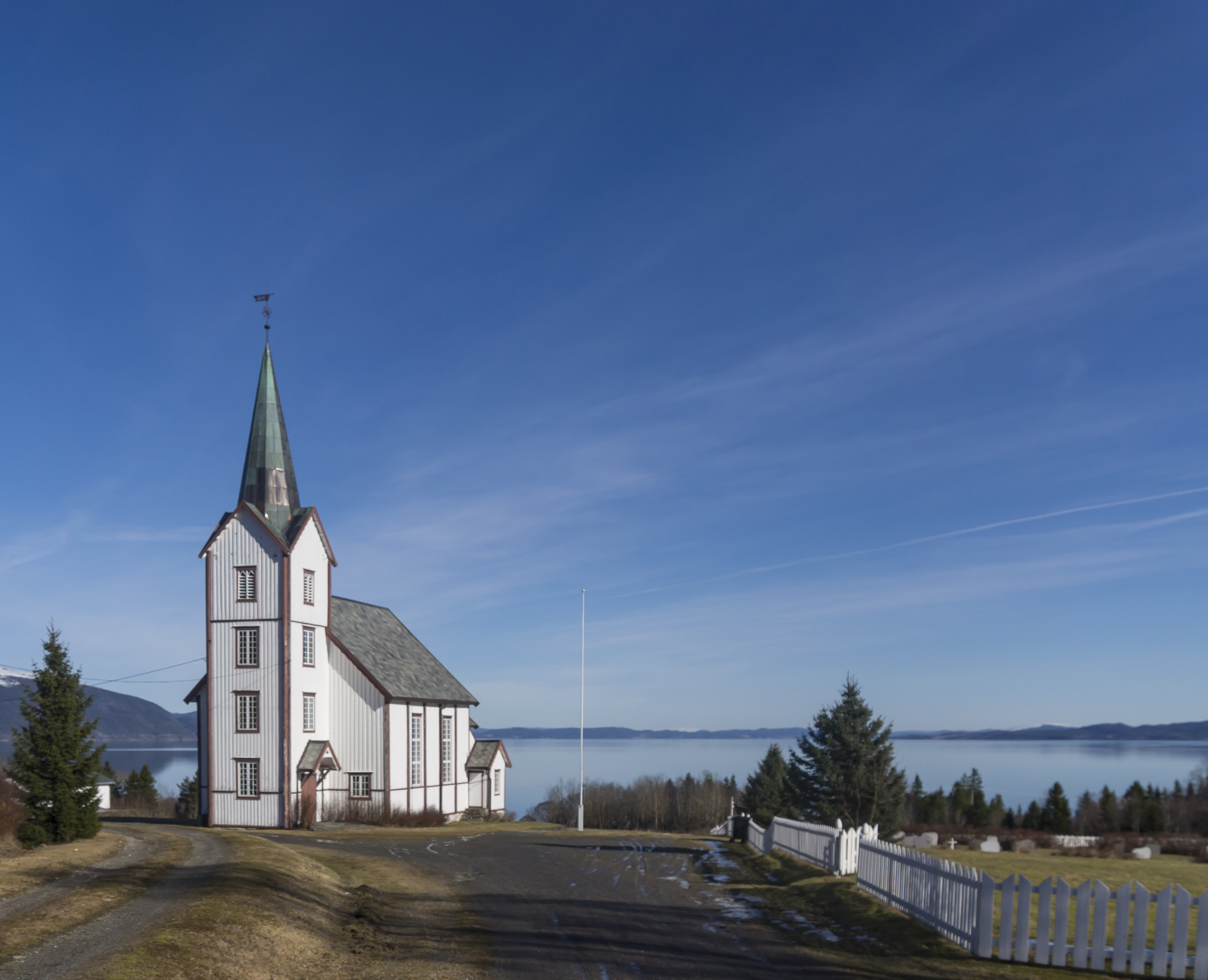

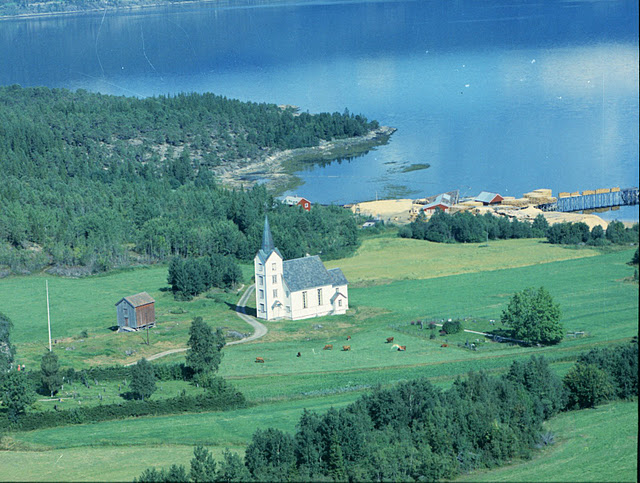

== See also ==
- List of churches in Nidaros
