= Trondheim Tramway controversy =

Transport controversy in Norway

A tram on the Lade Line in 1988, nine days before the tram system's closure

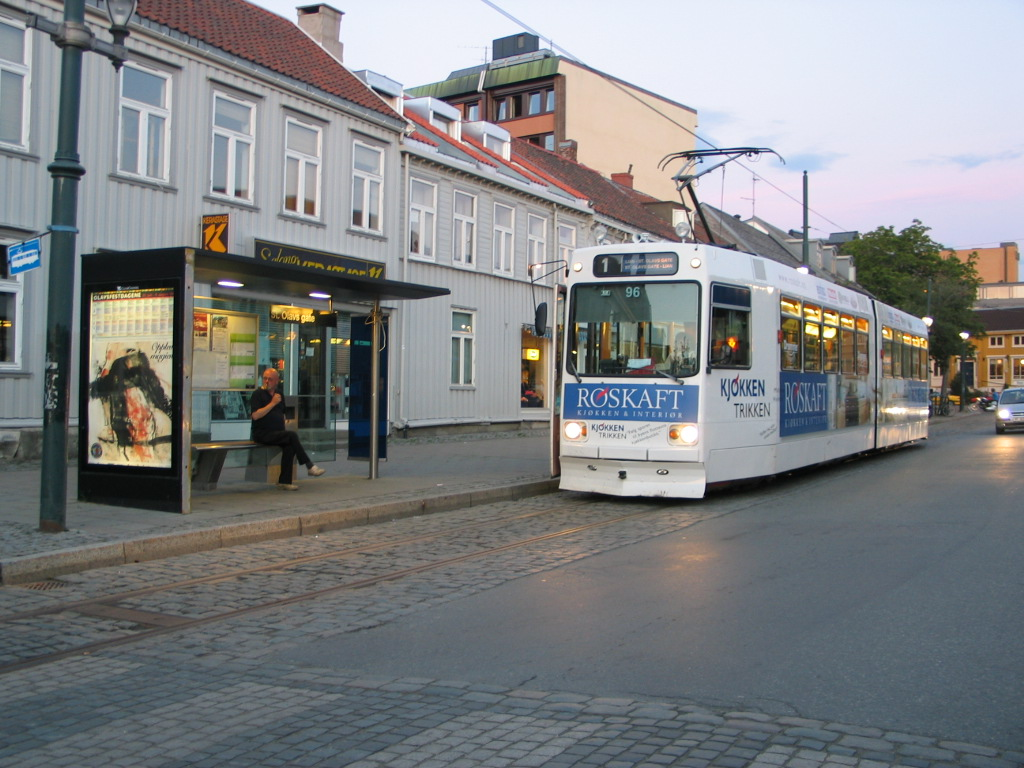
Despite the whole tramway being closed in 1988, trams still serve St. Olavs Gate, after part of the system reopened in 1990.

The Trondheim Tramway controversy regards the political discussion of whether Trondheim, Norway, should have a tramway.

The first debate came after the 1956 Dalsenget fire, when most of the city's tram fleet was destroyed; a proposal to replace the tramway with a trolleybus line was rejected. In 1968, the Singsaker Line was closed, and replaced by a bus route. From the merger of all bus and tram companies into Trondheim Trafikkselskap in 1974, the debate was intensified. In 1984, the Elgeseter Line was closed, but a new depot was built and eleven new trams delivered.

In 1988, the last tram line, from Lian to Lade, was terminated. The tracks in the city center and to Lade were removed, but the Gråkallen Line was kept to run heritage trams. By 1990, the trams were still not sold. Instead, the private company AS Gråkallbanen took over operations and seven trams, and have operated the Gråkallen Line since. The process cost two mayors their jobs.

== Merger ==
After the city owned both tramway companies, Graakalbanen and Trondheim Sporvei, after 1966, it was decided in 1969 to merge them as well as the newly purchased Bynesruten into Trondheim Trafikkselskap (TT). Organized as a limited company, the merger took effect on 1 January 1972. However, this occurred when public transport was becoming commercially unprofitable, and the city had was forced to give subsidies for the first time. Two years later, the private bus company Trondheim Bilruter was nationalized along with the Trondheim operations of Klæburuten and NSB Bilruter. On 1 January 1974, all the bus and tram transport throughout the city was organized as one entity.

Arne Watle, CEO of Trondheim Bilruter since 1951, was appointed CEO of the new company. Odd Hovdenak, former CEO of both Trondheim Sporvei and Graakalbanen, became CFO. In the beginning there were problems with two very different corporate cultures. TT established itself at Sorgenfri after the administration of the former companies had been scattered around town. Trondheim Sporvei had long had ambitions to also become a bus company; while it had captured a few routes, this ambition was merged into the new company culture.

During 1973 and 1974, the oil crisis had encouraged people to start taking more public transport. With high capacity, the trams were better suited than buses to cope with the 10% ridership increase, in particular on car-free Sundays. Other new concepts were monthly passes and senior discounts. During the early 1970s, the interest for environmentalism and people-friendly cities grew. Some politicians and activists demanded that decision processes be made open, and to reduce the massive plans for motorway construction throughout the municipality. In 1976, ridership increased by 12%. 6 million people were transport by two tram lines, while 14 million were transported on 38 bus lines.

== Reports ==
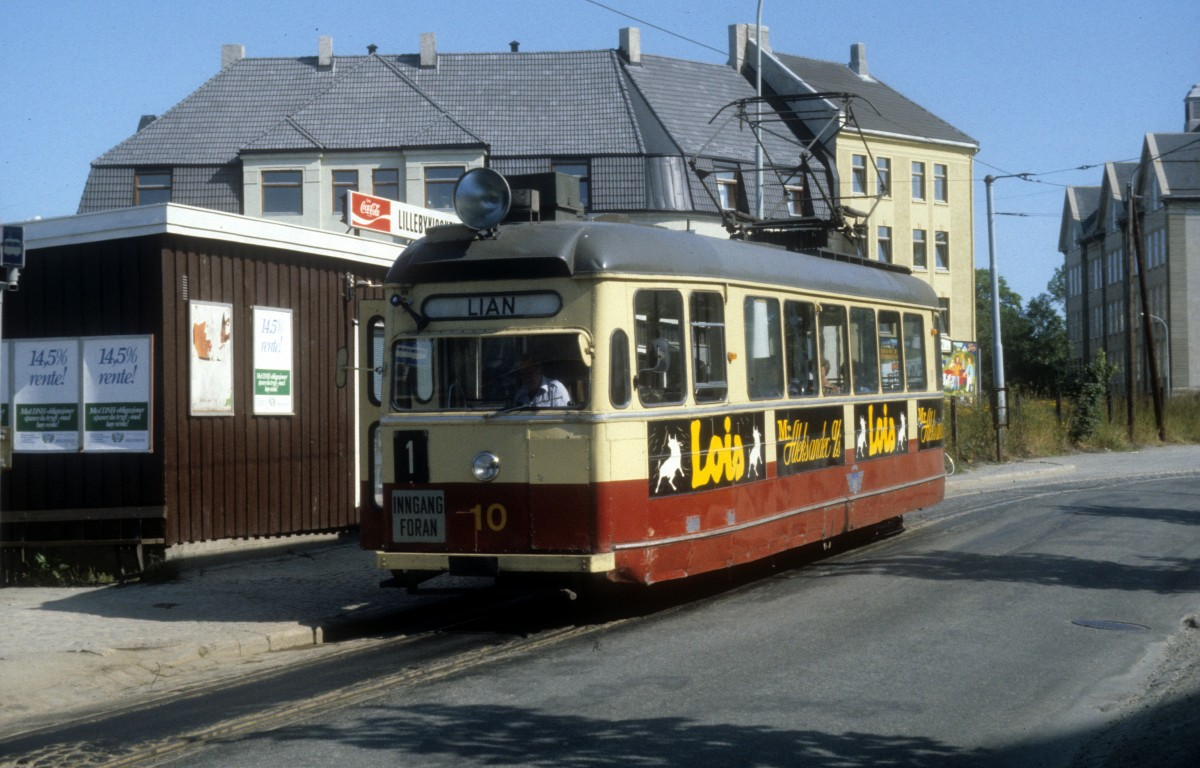
A Strømmen tram at Lademoen in 1982. Service to this terminus ended in 1983, but trams on the Lade Line continued to pass nearby.

=== First report ===
In 1975, the city council decided to order a report to consider the future of the tram. The work was done by the Norwegian Institute of Technology and Arne R. Reinertsen. In particular, it looked at how a new line could be built to Valentinlyst and onwards to the University of Trondheim campus at Dragvoll. Alternative 1 followed an at-grade route, along Innherredsveien to Strindheim, and along Bromstadveien, Kong Øysteins veg and Jonsvannsveien, and would cost NOK 68 million. The second alternative involved a 1.7 km (1.1 mi) tunnel from Bakkegate to Valentinlyst; this would cost NOK 209 million. Alternative 3 ran along Høyskoleveien from Studentersamfundet to Klæbuveien, and into a tunnel to Valentinlyst; this would cost NOK 116. All the sections were dimensioned for 70 km/h (43 mph), and were inspired by the new rapid transit in Oslo. Alternative 1 was recommended, but would give an annual increase in operation costs of NOK 6.8 million.

The report was then considered by the politicians on 28 April 1977. The Socialist Left Party supported alternative 1, while Odd Einar Dørum from the Liberal Party wanted new articulated trams. Both suggestions were only supported by the two respective parties. The Labour Party was split, and decided to win time by ordering a new report. Mayor Axel Busch from the Conservative Party said that the report gave just the conclusion he wanted. The first report was criticized for not considering the economic impact of replacing trams and trailers with new articulated trams, which would have lower operating costs. It also failed to take into consideration the increased ridership that the comfort of trams resulted in.

=== Change of operation ===
During 1978, the Ministry of Transport and Communications required all public transport companies to reduce their costs. TT announced that they wanted to close the Voldsminde Loop on the Lade Line. Instead, a 7.5-minute headway would be introduced from Lade to the Elgeseter Line/Ila Line intersection in Prinsens gate, and both the Gråkallen Line and the Elgeseter line would get a 15-minute headway. This schedule would be able to operate with one less tram in service, and would give a significant reduction in costs. However, Chairman Jens Trøtteberg from the Conservatives chose to present this suggestion in the newspaper, and also his sentiment that the whole network be closed. The deputy chairman Eigil Gullvåg and the labor unions criticized the suggestion, saying that it would not be beneficial to close parts of the network. The city council rejected the proposal on 20 December 1979.

=== Proposal for expansion ===
The second report was initiated by a committee in January 1978. When presented in nine volumes in March 1979, it recommended two new tramways: Lade–Midtbyen–NTH–Risvollan–Heimdalsbyen and Lian–Midtbyen–NTH–Nardo–Moholt–Stokkan. By 1990, this would capture 90% of the public transport in the municipality. Investments would be NOK 340 million and annual operating costs would be NOK 103–106 million. A diesel bus system would cost 81 million annually, while a trolleybus network would cost 87 million annually. The report recommended the diesel bus alternative. An information office was established by the city in Hornemannsgården in the city square. The information brochure made by the city announced that the investment costs were equal to five new schools, ten new kindergartens, two swimming halls, a library and 1,000 new housing lots. The report was considered by the city council on 29 March. After a long debate, the council decided to keep the existing network, and upgrade the rolling stock and tracks. This was again stated in a new vote on 24 August.

Due to this decision, 700 m (2,300 ft) of track were replaced in 1979 in Strandveien, Innherredsveien and Mellomvien. At Buran, the trams to Lade and Voldsminde each got their own track so they could pass each other during red lights. In 1980–82, the whole Ila Line was renovated; Nordre Ilevolden was transformed into a pure public transport road, and the tram was given its own road from Ila to Bergsli gate. On the Gråkallen Line, wooden sleepers were replaced with concrete, and the track weight was increased from 35 to 41 kg/m, and the tracks were welded.

== Political trial ==
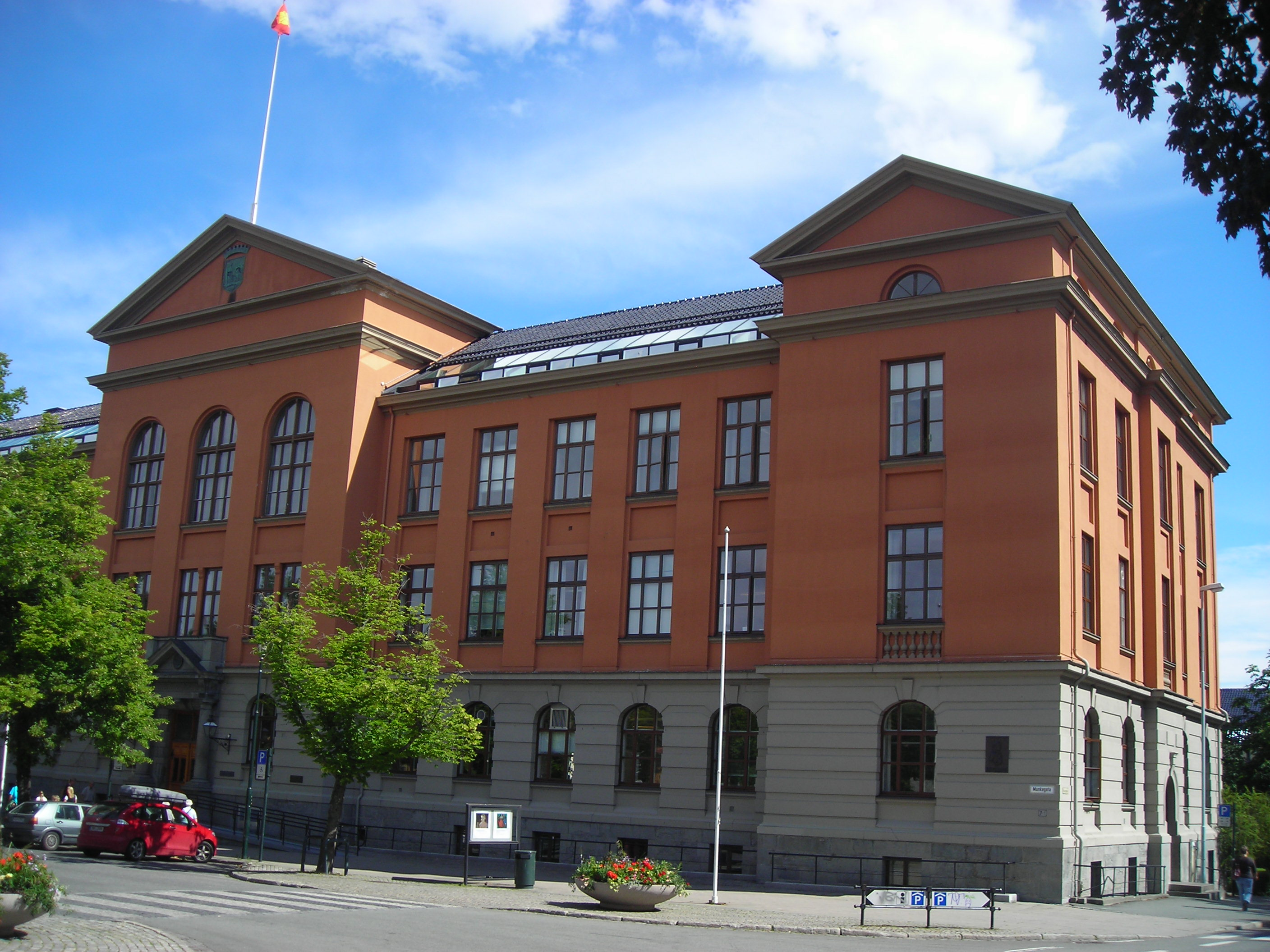
The city hall

=== Political circus ===
During 1979, state subsidies became part of the debate. The 1970s saw a large increase in state subsidies to bus operations. Mayor Olav Gjærevoll had contacted the state to investigate if the tram could receive the same subsidy level as an equivalent bus route, but this had been rejected by the department, even though Minister of Transport, Ronald Bye of the Labour Party, was positive. Chief of Administration Odd Sagør suggested, during the Standing Committee on Transport and Communications of the Norwegian Parliament's visit to Trondheim in 1979, that state road funds could be used on tramway infrastructure. He noted that the trams did not receive state subsidies and were responsible for funding infrastructure. This suggestion was rejected.

The Labour Party had lost the election in 1975, and Axel Buch from the Conservatives had become mayor. During the 1979 election, the Labour Party had chosen the slogan "rather tram than Buch". They increased from 34 to 36 seats, but the right-wing parties claimed 43 mandates while the Conservatives had their best election ever. Hildur Karsesten, a woman tram driver, made the decisive vote. The election proved contentious. Members of the labour union organized a secret council meeting between Karstensen and Olav Gjørevoll, the Labour mayor candidate, during which rumors spread that the right-wing coalition would not hold. During a pause, a search was started for Kristiansen, who had to hide in a room of Labour politicians. Conservative Hans Sørum tried to enter the room, and took a grip of Kristian Dimmen's tie. This proved the closest there had been to a direct fight in the city council. Gjærevoll was elected mayor.

=== New trams ===
In 1979, TT started working on the process of ordering new trams. The whole fleet of Class 7 trams was from 1958, and these would soon need replacement. Invitations to tenders were sent in July 1980. A study trip was taken by seven people to the factories of ČKD Tatra in Czechoslovakia and Duewag in Germany. They also looked at the tramways in Brno and Essen. By 1 December, eight bids had come in from La Brugeoise et Nivelles (BN), Linke-Hofmann-Busch (LHB), Strømmens Værksted, Duewag, Schweizerische Industrie Gesellschaft, Valmet, Waggon Union and Pragoinvest/Tatra.

Only LHB and Valmet would deliver the special 260 cm (100 in) wide trams used in Trondheim. The bid from Tatra was the cheapest (at NOK 2.2 million per tram), but 33 units would be needed, since they would have to run as double units. An alternative with using ten of the newest trailers. The committee instead chose to the articulated, six-axle, tram from LHB as the Class 8. For both lines, trams would be needed, costing NOK 80 million. Various suggestions were made to avoid a full load financing. This included using NOK 20 million from the parking fund, but despite the matter being considered by the government, the money was never used.

=== Only one line ===
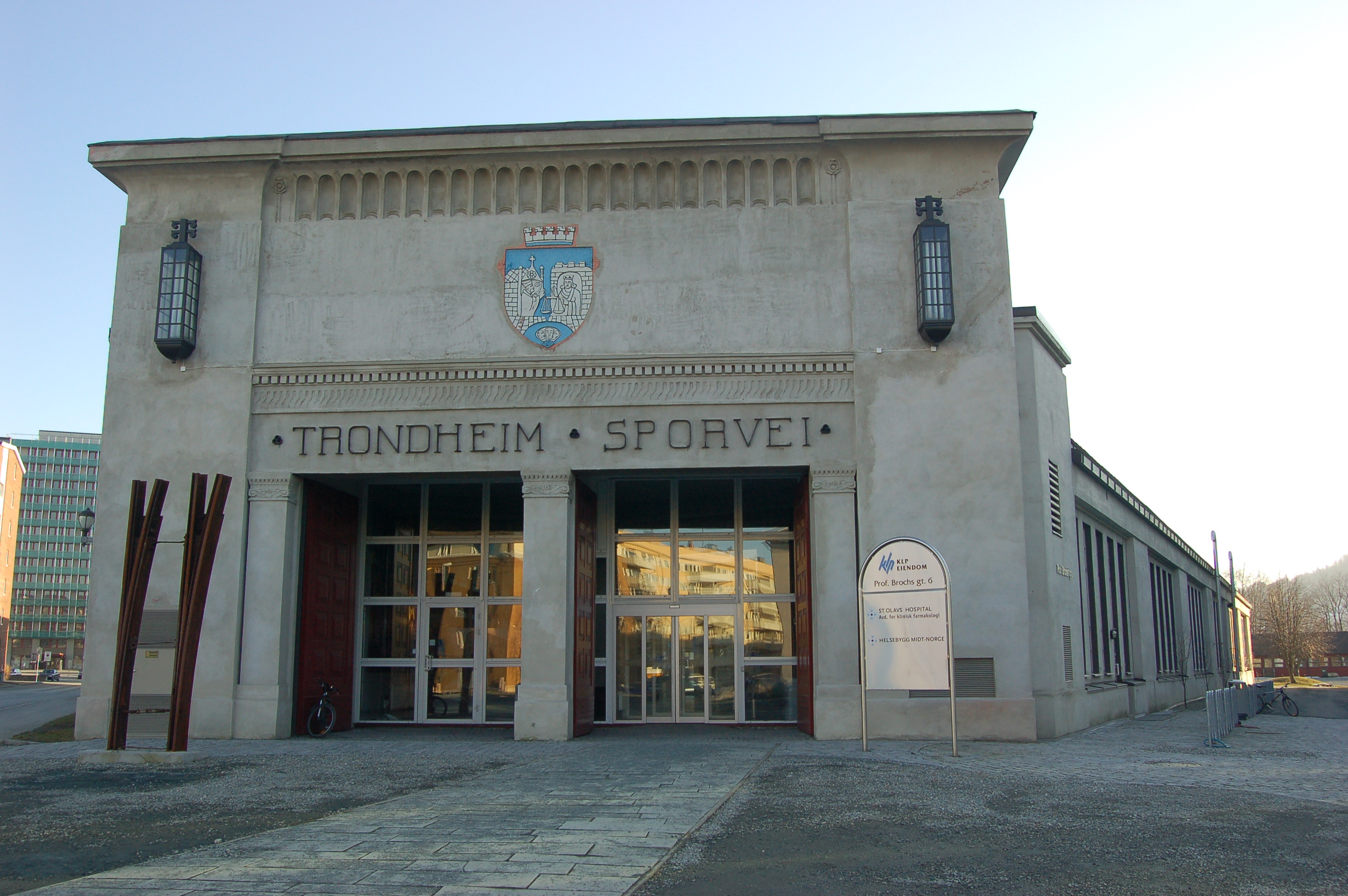
Dalsenget Depot

In 1981, the schedules were changed. 10-minute headways were reduced to 12 minutes, and to 20 minutes outside rush hour. Reduced state subsidies reduced schedules throughout the TT network in 1982, and again in 1983. Ridership declined 13.7% in 1982, to 12.7 million, while the tram had 4.3 million. The support for the tram among the tram-friendly parties started declining in the early 1980s. Both the Labour, Liberal and Socialist Left Party had several members who became opposed to tram operations. On 26 November 1981, the city council decided to consider reducing the number of trams to eleven, and close line 2, from Voldsminde to Elgeseter. To save the line, Ulf Ulseth suggested using the old stock on line 2.

The chief of administration made a proposal to close line 2. The overlapping traffic could be taken over by the trams, and the traffic to Elgeseter could be taken over by southbound buses. This would force the main depot, located at Dalsenget, to be closed. The depot at Munkvoll was suggested rebuilt for NOK 34 million, including NOK 11 for machines. Dalsenget was valuated at NOK 15 million, and proposed sold. Ulseth's proposal would require five trams in route, demanding ten in total. This would also require NOK 6.5 million upgrade to the Elgeseter Line, plus new trams for line 2 around 1990. The new trams would increase the annual capital costs with 1.6 million, but reduce operating costs with NOK 1.2 million. One line would cost NOK 2.9 million per year, with investments of NOK 19.3 million. Two lines would cost 5.7 million to operate, and require investments of NOK 22 million. The labor union supported two lines, noting that expansion southwards and eastwards would be impossible with the lines abandoned, and that there would be no excess capacity in the new depot at Dalsenget. They also claimed operation could be rationalized by NOK 4.4 million at Dalsenget, and that old trams could be operated beyond 1990.

On 27 May 1982, the board of TT voted five against two for Ulseth's suggestion to keep two lines, and change the trams to run Lian–Lade and Elgeseter–Voldsminde. The votes for a single line were by Conservative Jens Trøtteberg and Liberal Merie Widerøe. In July, the executive committee of the city council voted to have only one new line, buy eleven trams and build a new depot. On 26 August 1982, the city council considered the matter. With 43 against 42 votes the city council voted to close down the whole tram line. However, since that proposal was not on the protocol, the matter would have to be voted over a second time. It turned out that two members of the Socialist Left Party, Sigrid Irtun and Petra Johansen, had been away during the first voting. Irtun had been told by the party leadership to stay home, while Johansen had left the party and did not meet on a regular basis. Both women met to the final voting, and with 44 against 41 votes the city council decided to keep the tramway, but close the Elgeseter Line. Eleven trams were ordered, and a new depot was to be built. The executive committee agreed to the NOK 62 million contract with LHB on 29 September.

== Intermezzo ==
A Class 8 tram on Jarleveien, inbound on the Lade Line, in 1988

The change of schedules was changed from the winter routes in 1982. Both had a 12-minutes headway during rush hour, while line 1 (Lian–Lade) had a 20-minute headway in the evening, and line 2 (Elgeseter–Voldsminde) had 24 minutes. Line 2 did not operate on Sundays. 11 June 1983 was the last day with line 2 in service. The cities newest depot was razed, and Dalsenget had all depot service from 2 May 1983. The city's tramway network was reduced to 13.2 km (8.2 mi), but the headway changed to 10 minutes. 1983 gave an operating deficit of NOK 18.4 million. The first year after line 2 was closed, traffic sank 41%, from 4.3 to 2.5 million passengers.

With the delivery of new trams, operational costs would be reduced. A new washing hall would replace cleaners; combined with reduced maintenance on new trams, it would yield a reduction from 40 to 13 depot employees. Line employees would be reduced from 27 to 5–6 after the upgrade to concrete sleepers was finished on the Gråkallen Line. The articulated trams would not need the conductors that used in the trailers, and an additional 20 jobs could be removed.

Due to errors in the decision documents regarding the cost of the new depot. Instead of a net cost of NOK 21 million, it increased to NOK 40 million—several costs had been forgotten, and NOK 9.7 million in new machinery had to be dropped. This showed that it would have been cheaper to keep the depot at Dalsenget, and just use the tracks to Elgeseter for transport to the depot. However, on 16 August 1984, the city council decided to transfer Dalsenget to a municipal property company, and develop it as a "techno stable" for new ventures. Therefore, the possible sales price would not go to reducing the debt to finance the new depot at Munkvoll. Combined with the unwillingness to use the parking funds, this resulted in 100% loan financing of the depot and the trams, the most expensive method. The new depot at Munkvoll opened 6 June 1984.

The first articulated tram came to Trondheim on 29 July 1984. It was stored at Voldsminde, while part of the track through the city center was removed for maintenance. The first test run was on 22 August, and the last tram was delivered on 4 January 1985. The track on the Gråkallen Line was replaced, and a new packing machine was bought. The platforms on the Gråkallen Line had to be rebuilt to a lower platform height. On 28 March 1985, the city council voted to transform TT into a limited company. In 1986, tram ridership increased by 2.4%.

== New debate ==
=== Sale of trams? ===
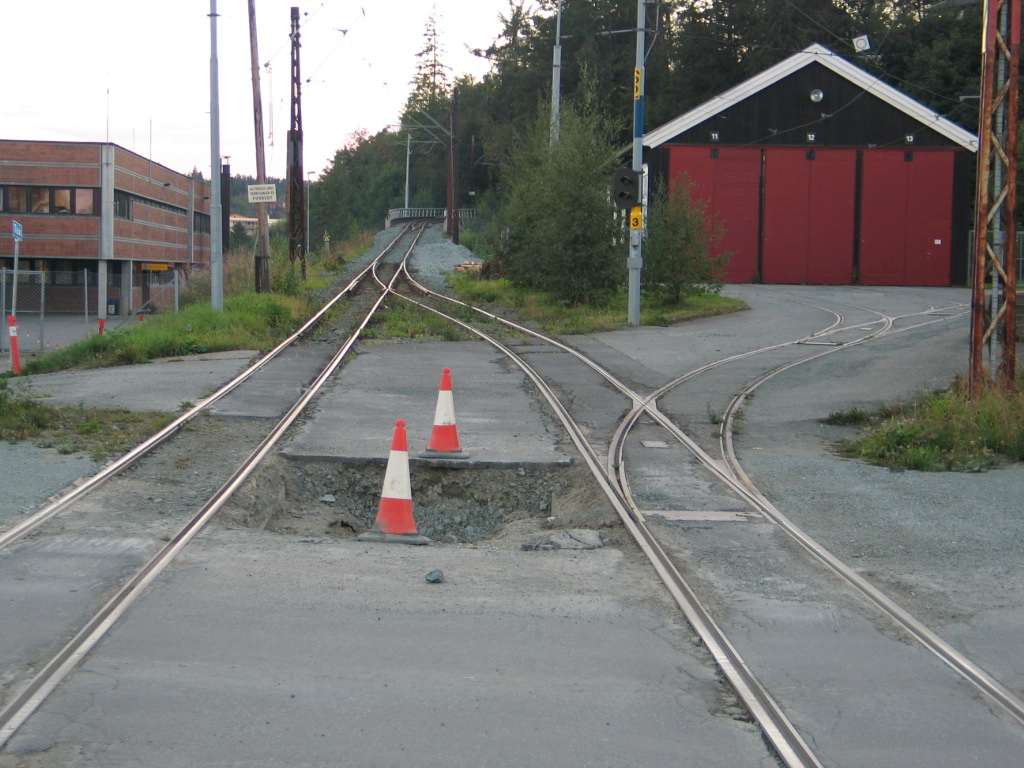
Munkvoll Depot: The new depot on the left, heritage trams stored to the right

After new trams, track and depot were in place, the tramway debate started again. In 1985, the city council voted for a full economic analysis of the costs of trams versus diesel buses. The question was if it would be possible to sell the trams to other cities. Trondheim had chosen an unusual combination of meter gauge and 260 cm (8 ft 6 in) wide wagons. Oslo Sporveier was considered as a possible purchaser, but then the trams would have to be rebuilt, costing NOK 1.9 million per unit. Also, Oslo Sporveier had slightly larger trams, and felt the Class 8 was too small for their needs. Conservative chair of Oslo Sporveier, Haakon Magnus Preus said live at a public meeting for the labor union in January that they did not want the trams. TT still felt that it would be possible to sell the trams for NOK 45 million.

Another problem was how to serve the population along the Gråkallen Line by bus. While there were roads to Lade, they were not suitable in Byåsen. Uglaveien would have to be upgraded for NOK 12.6 million, and new road following the right-of-way, and a rebuilding of the intersection with General Bangs vei. Total costs would be NOK 17 million. Costs were reduced to NOK 6.3 by only building a single lane road from Kyvannet to Lian. In addition, NOK 6 million was estimated as income from sale of the right-of-way. TT suggested two new bus routes: Lian–Munkvoll–Bøckmans vei–Stavne–Midtbyen–Lade and Breidablikk–Byåsenveien–Midtbyen–Lade. TT claimed they could save NOK 19 million by closing down the tramway.<

=== More reports ===
An alternative report was launched by business administration student Knut Myhre. It showed that the TT report had false premises, since it had calculated the amortization from 1987 to 2000, as compared to the end of the economic lifetime of the trams around 2020. Other parts of the methodology were also criticized. The chair of TT, Ove Dalheim (Labour), and chief of administration, Axel Buch, both supported the closing of the tram. Dahlheim, a railway employee and a former member of the Communist Party, had been an eager supporter of the tramway, but subsequently changed his mind.

Rolv Sverre Fostervold from the Labour Party suggested new expansions of the tramway. Parts of the Labour Party, as well as the Centre, Liberal and Socialist Left Party agreed to demand a new report exploring extending the tramway from Munkvoll to Vikåsen and Heimdal. TT's new report in 1986 was criticized, and another report by the external consultants A. R. Reinertsen, Asplan and Vattbyggnadsbyrået was instead published in 1987. This resulted in controversy on 5 November, when it was reported on the front page of newspapers that Gjærevoll and Fostervold had met with Reinertsen in the fall of 1986.

The report proposed two new routes: Munkvoll–Saupstadringen–Kattem (9.8 km or 6.1 mi) and Mellomveien/Buran–Strindheim–Brundalen–Dragvoll–Nedre Vikåsen (11.1 km or 6.9 mi). The lines would cost NOK 393 million to be divided equally between the two lines, and included a NOK 15 million track upgrade through the city center. A tunnel to Valentinlyst was again considered, as a better and cheaper route than the 1977 proposal had been outlined. 19 new trams would need to be ordered to operate the lines. The report claimed that it would cost 78 million more to operate than a bus system, but would result in noticeably less pollution. The models did not presume higher traffic for tram than for buses, despite previous evidence of the opposite. Also, most of the cost difference was related to the tramway having to pay the tracks itself, while the buses would use existing roadways.

The report was criticized by the committee member Sivert Schevig, the representative from the employees, who felt that the report's conclusion was predetermined and the supporting material modified to support the conclusion. An opposing report was made by Knut Myhre and Rune Kjenstad, who claimed that the line would be built using overly expensive standards and that costs could be reduced by 30%. While they agreed that a full expansion was not feasible, they felt that shorter expansions should be considered more carefully. The opposing report claimed that closing the tramway would save NOK 6–7.8 million, while the initial report claimed that 19 million could be saved.

=== Closure ===
From 1983 to 1987, municipal subsidies to the tramway were reduced from NOK 18 to 15 million. However, the capital costs were NOK 23 million, so the tram had an operating profit of 8 million. The public debate had shifted from having a wide range of arguments, to being a fully economic debate. The Labour Party was in the decisive position, and in May 1987, its general meeting voted 71 against 25 to keep the tramway—but this time the council members were not bound to vote with the party. When the matter was decided in the city council on 18 July, nine Labour politicians chose vote for closure. Also members of the Socialist Left Party voted against the tramway, and with 53 votes against 32, the city council decided to abandon the cities whole tramway network. A memo from TT had circulated among the politicians, showing that the sales price for the trams and depot would increase, giving a saving of NOK 30 million if the tramway was closed. On 6 August, a haste paragraph was used by the executive committee to grant NOK 7.5 million to build a bus road from Ugla, and TT ordered 20 new buses for NOK 19.1 million.

=== A new political party ===
Many tram-friendly politicians were disappointed about how the Labour and Socialist Left Party had not been able to secure the tramway, despite a left-winged majority in the city council. Labour politician Asle B. Bjørgen and Centre politician Steinar Nygård founded a new part, the City List, that would found its political basis on support for the tram. Several other politicians from the Labour, Centre and Socialist Left parties also joined it. Following the 1987 election, the City List won six seats, and was larger than the Christian Democrats, the Liberals, the Centre Party and Red Electoral Alliance. In particular, the party had received many votes from areas that were served by the tram, such as Byåsen, Lademoen and Lade. The Labour Party was reduced from 35 to 31 councilors, while the Conservatives dropped from 28 to 21.

A tram on the Lade Line, along Olav Trygvassons gate, in the last month of service in 1988

After the election, the City List made a committee to find ways to rationalize operations, led by engineer Arne Vidar Hesjedal. Among the findings, was that while the trams were responsible for 15% of the traffic, they were paying 30% of the administrative overhead, and they were charged NOK 10 in administration per route kilometer. He also identified ways to reduce costs at the depot and with the infrastructure. It was also pointed out that since 1983, Oslo Sporveier had received state support for the tramway in Oslo on the same basis as the buses; Hesjedal presumed that such an agreement would now also be possible for Trondheim. If granted equal as buses per kilometer, this would give NOK 3 million in subsidies. Hesjedal claimed that the tramway could operate NOK 15 million cheaper than with the current cost structure, but this would require that it become a separate business unit within TT—just like Oslo Sporveier had done. The new CEO of TT, Arne J. Nymo, claimed that the result was not correct.

In January, after the chief of administration had let the matter of the tramway again be voted over by the city council, the board of TT voted, with one vote's majority, in favor of keeping the trams. The board members from the City List and the Progress Party as well as the labor union's two members were sufficient to secure a majority. The City List had been part of the basis for the left-winged majority in the city council, and had supported Per Berge as major. They now threatened that if Berge and the Labour Party voted in disfavor of keeping the tram, they would not support his reelection for major in 1989. Given that the City List had the decisive vote in the council, this was a credible threat. During the proceedings in the city council on 27 May 1988, CEO Nymo chose to argue along the line of the administration, and not the company's board. With 50 votes against 35, the city council finally voted to abandon the tramway. Due to Nymo's disloyalty to the board, either he or the board had to retire. On 8 August, a new board was appointed, without members from the City List.

=== The last tram runs ===
The last tram ran on 12 June, carrying about 20,000 passengers. All the trams were then parked in Voldsminde Depot, while the heritage trams were moved to Munkvoll. The Gråkallen Line, including the Ila Line and the St. Olavs gate loop, would be spared, and would become a heritage tramway, with a tramway museum at Munkvoll. The Class 8 trams would be stored at Voldsminde until a suitable purchaser could be found. At Voldsminde, located just beside the Nordland Line, they could be freighted away by train. With the start of roadworks in Prinsens gate on 14 June, a section of track through the city center was removed, making the tracks east of that point unusable, and the overhead wiring was soon removed over the entire city centre–Lade section.

== Reincarnation ==
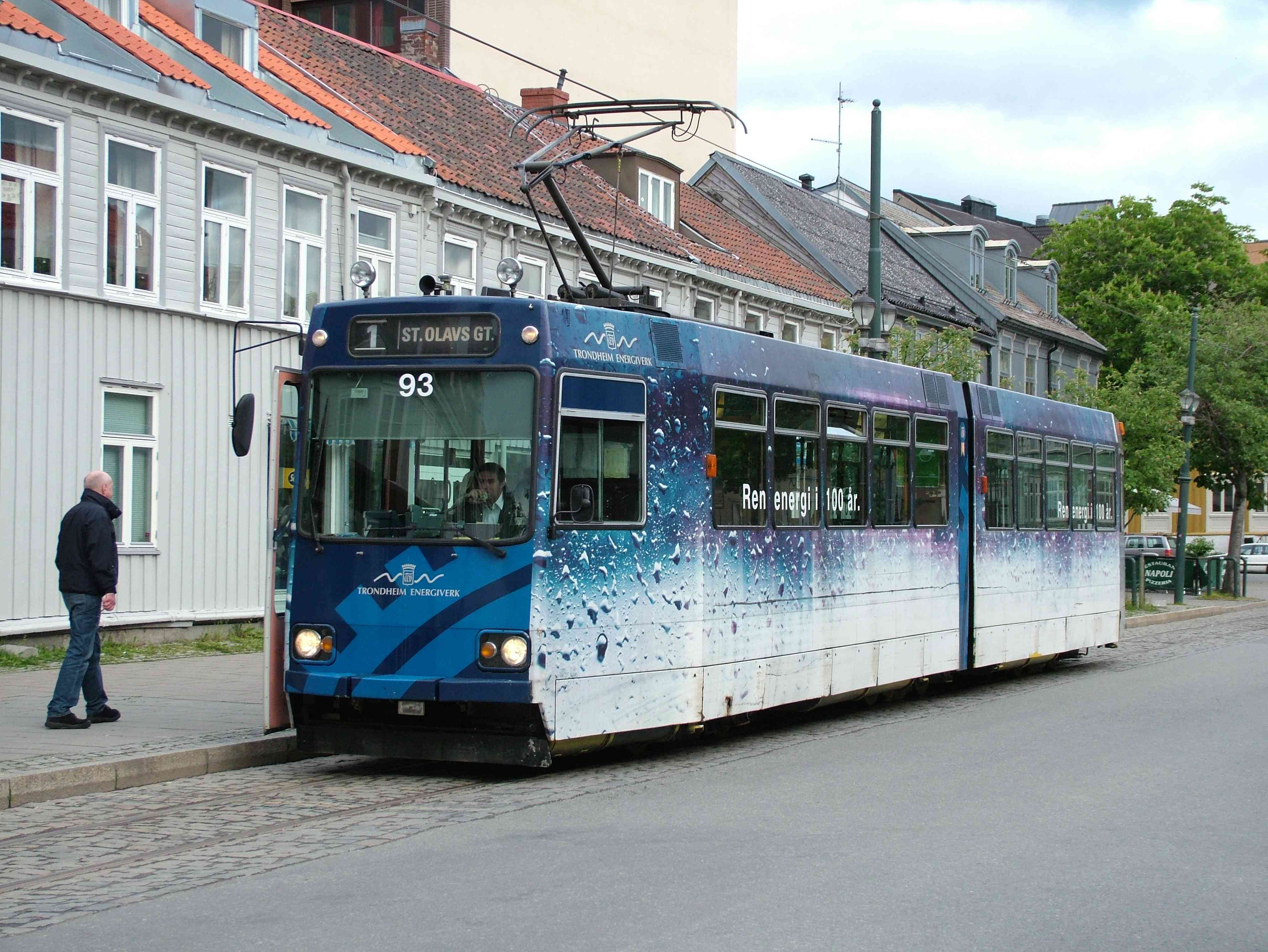
One of the AS Gråkallbanen's trams at the St. Olavs Gate terminus

Friends of the Gråkall Line (Norwegian: Gråkallbanens venner) was founded in October 1988. It attracted many local people in Byåsen who were dissatisfied with the bus service, along with many tram enthusiasts, and politicians from Bylista. This resulted in AS Gråkallbanen being founded. It proposed a more rational operation of the line, limited to the remaining right-of-way from St. Olavs Gate to Lian. The company offered a back door to several politicians, since it claimed it could operate the tram without municipal subsidies.

On 22 June 1989, the city council voted to re-open the line from St. Olavs Gate to Lian. After the matter was re-considered on 31 August, it passed with 42 votes against 40. The company was free to receive subsidies from the county and the state. The new company started negotiating with TT about the details of the takeover. In particular, the number of trams to be used was a difficult matter. Gråkallbanen wanted all eleven, while TT would only give up six. In the end the politicians voted to give seven cars to the new company. Since the tram lines were presumed to be kept for the museum line, Gråkallbanen was not charged the extra NOK 135,000 for maintaining the tracks on the roads. The city also accepted to take economic responsibility for the heritage trams. During the discussions, TT demanded that the municipality pay NOK 23.8 million for the trams, depots and other material, but this was rejected by the city. The city also chose to give NOK 5 million to Gråkallbanen as a one-time payment, equal to the subsidies they were giving TT to operate the new bus routes in Byåsen. The negotiated agreement was passed by the city council on a vote of 51 to 34.

After all the agreements were in place, TT announced on 30 December 1989 that it had found a new buyer for the trams. An agreement had been reached with the Copenhagen-based Unimex Engineering, who would sell the eleven trams to the Cairo Tramway. On 2 January 1990, TT sent a letter to Gråkallbanen giving them the option to purchase the trams for the same price as the Egyptians, at an estimated NOK 17–20 million. However, Gråkallbanen pointed out to the politicians that it was possible to purchase used articulated trams for DEM 20,000 from the Stuttgart Stadtbahn. The company took the press with it to Stuttgart to negotiate the agreement, and afterwards Adresseavisen presented the city's new trams to the public. However, by the time the delegation had returned, they were informed that the deal had been annulled. Adresseavisen tried to locate Unimex in Copenhagen, but it turned out to be a company that had never sold a tram. At a press conference in Trondheim, the director of TT blamed Arbeider-Avisa's journalists for the deal's not going through. When asked about the matter, representatives from the tramway company in Cairo said that the deal did not go through because the trams did not fit.

=== Reopening ===
The final decision to reopen the tram system was made by the city council on 29 March 1990. In the meantime, the City List had changed their political support for the 1989 mayor election. Instead of supporting the Labour candidate Per Berge, they instead chose to support the Conservative Marvin Wiseth—who took over as mayor 1 January 1990. The Conservative Party was more than willing to support any suggestions that involved privatization. After this, the right-wing parties succeeded in retaining the mayoralty until 2003.

On 9 June 1990, the overhead wires were powered up, and from 3 July there were test-runs with some of the historic trams. Tracks and substructure were replaced between Nyveibakken and Bergsli gate. A ballast tamper was rented from Germany, and the asphalt from Kyvannet to Herlofsonløypa was removed. Part of the work was done by volunteers. The night before 6 July, seven of the trams (no. 1, 2, 3, 6, 8, 9 and 11) were taken out of the Voldesminde depot at Lademoen, and moved by truck to Kongens gate, where they were put onto the Gråkall Line. They were then hauled by the working machine to Munkvoll. At noon the next day the first tram made a trial run in the city streets. The trams initially retained the TT color scheme, but were given the GB logo. At the same time they were renumbered (90–99, with gaps for individual cars not transferred to GB). The official opening was on 18 August 1990, with a parade of historic trams leading the way.

The traffic the first full year was 900,000 passengers annually, which was 20% higher than with the buses. Passenger numbers decreased until 1997, when they started rising somewhat. That year saw the introduction of a new bus connection with the tram at Breidablikk, and it offered a link with Marienborg, St. Olavs Hospital and Øya. During the 2000s ridership stabilized somewhat at around 800,000. However, in the latter part of the 2000s, ridership began to increase again, and this trend is expected to continue to rise considerably, as the city is introducing a more environmentally friendly scheme to reduce personal car use in the city, known as Miljøpakke Trondheim.^{(NO)}
