= Singsaker Line =

Tram line in Trondheim, Norway

Coordinates: 63°25′38″N 10°24′59″E

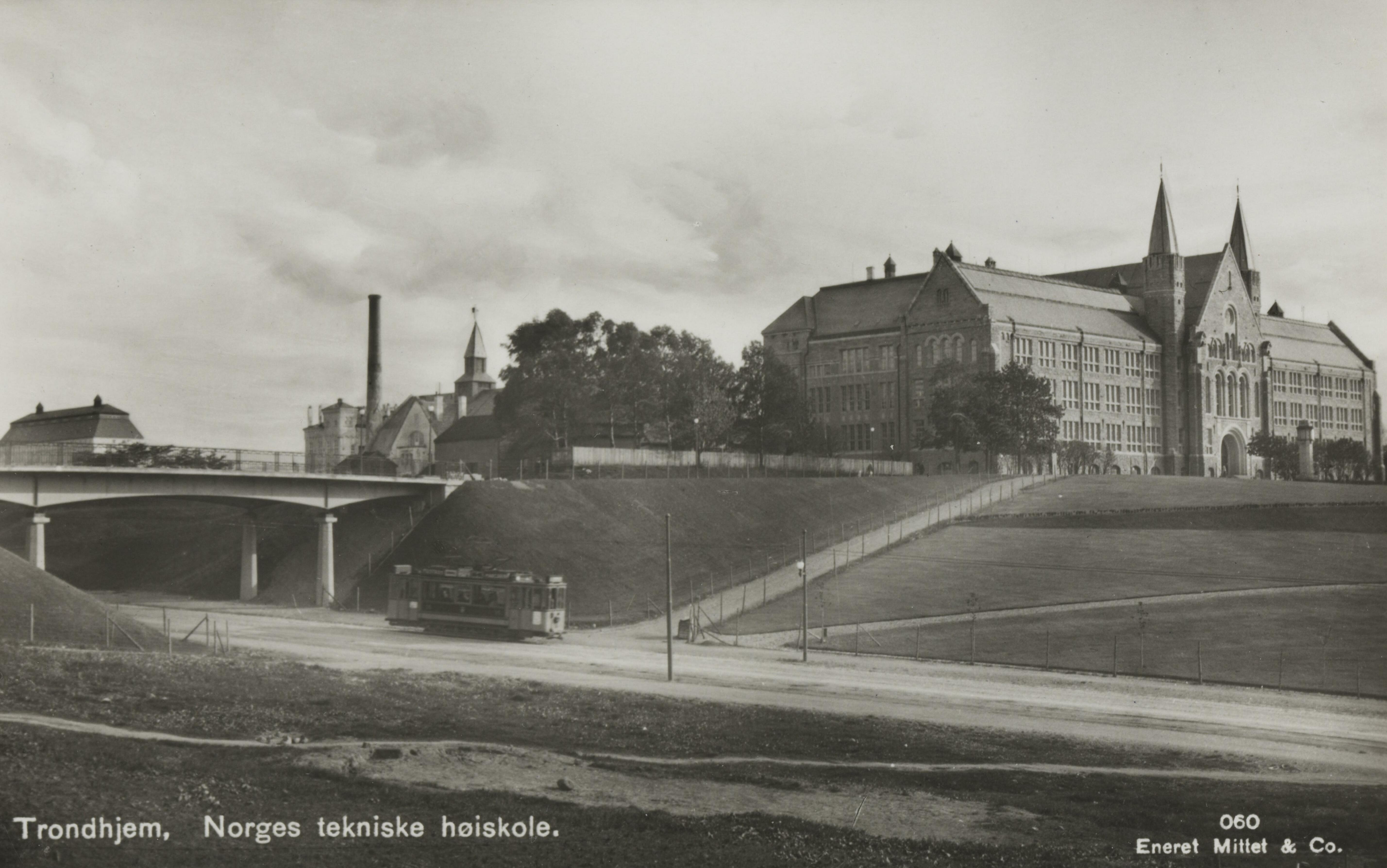
- A tram on the Singsaker Line in the late 1920s, with NTNU in the background.

Overview
- Native name: Singsakerlinjen
- Status: Abandoned
- Owner: Trondheim Municipality
- Termini: Student Society; Rosenborg

Service
- Type: Tramway
- System: Trondheim Tramway
- Operator(s): Trondheim Sporvei

History
- Opened: 27 September 1927
- Closed: 20 November 1968

Technical
- Line length: 3.3 km (2.1 mi)
- Track length: 4.5 km (2.8 mi)
- Number of tracks: double
- Track gauge: 1,000 mm (3 ft 3 3/8 in)

The Singsaker Line (Norwegian: Singsakerlinjen) was a branch of the Trondheim Tramway which ran from Øya and Elgeseter to the neighborhoods of Singsaker, parts of Tyholt and Rosenborg in Trondheim, Norway. The line branched off from the Elgeseter Line at the Student Society. It was double track until Tyholtveien, after which it ran through a loop through Rosenborg. It was served by Line 3, which continued through the city center to Trondheim Central Station.

The line opened in 1927 to Ankers gate and was the first of the network not to feature conductors. It was extended to Asbjørnsens gate in 1933. Until 1955 it used the old Class 2 trams, but after 1958 it received wide, more comfortable Class 4 trams. The Rosenborg Loop opened in 1958 along with the introduction of Class 7 trams. In this configuration it was 3.3 kilometers (2.1 mi) long. The line was closed in 1968 and replaced by buses.

== Route ==
The Singsaker Line branched as a double track line from the Elgeseter Line at Student Society in Trondheim (Studentersamfundet). There it branched off Elgeseter gate immediately after the Elgeseter Bridge and ran up the hill along Klostergata. The line continues with the street name change to Christian Fredriks gate with the stop Vollabakken. It continues under the College Bridge onto Eidsvolls gate, passing the Norwegian Institute of Technology. After passing Jonsvannsveien the line had a stop named for said road outside R. Kjeldbergs Kolonial, serving the neighborhood of Singsaker.

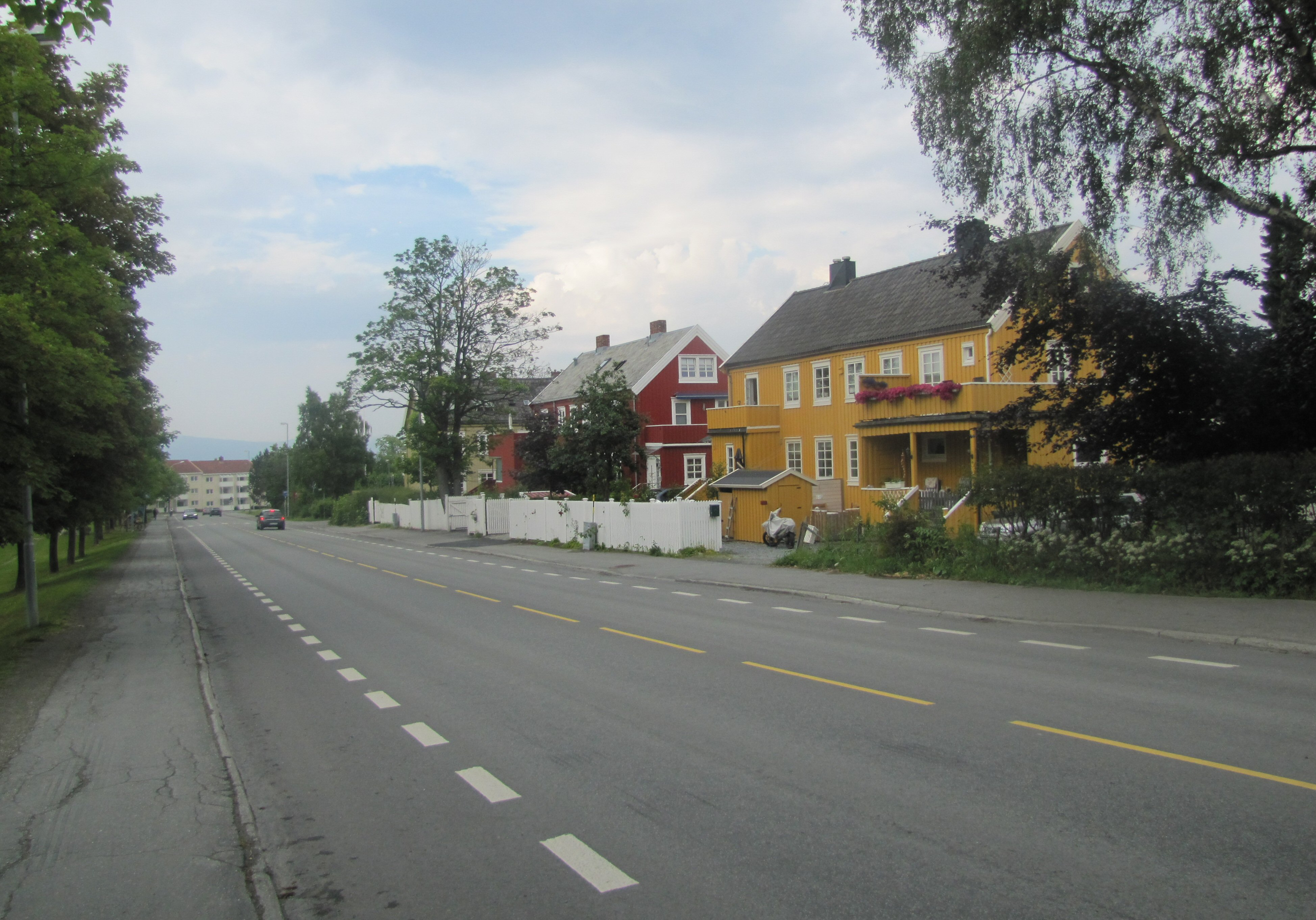
Festningsgata

Upon reaching Tyholtveien the double track shifts to a single-direction loop run anti-clockwise. Upbound trams continued along Tyholtveien to the stop at Asbjørns gate, which served the Tyholt neighborhood. This section consisted of double track laid prior to the loop being built. Asbjørns gate was used for a regulation pause in the schedule. The line continued along Henrik Mathiesens vei to a stop named Lærerhøyskolen. This served the neighborhood of Rosenborg and a campus of the Norwegian College of Teaching in Trondheim. The line then continued down one block of Christians Monsens gate before reaching Stadsingeniør Dahls gate. Just afterwards the tram made a stop. The line continues along the center lane to a stop at Nonnegata. The street turns slightly and changes its name to Festningsgata and then completes the loop.

From Elgeseter Bridge Line 3 continued in to town via the Elgeseter Line. It runs northwards through the city center along Prinsens gate. Until 1961 it ran via Kongens gate, Torget and Munkegata to Ravnkloa. After 1961 the line instead followed Prinsens gate, with a stop at the intersection of Prinsens and Kongens gate. It then ran onto Olav Tryggvasons gate until Søndre gate. There it had a stop and then continued along Søndre gate across the canal to Trondheim Central Station, the terminus.

== History ==
=== Construction ===
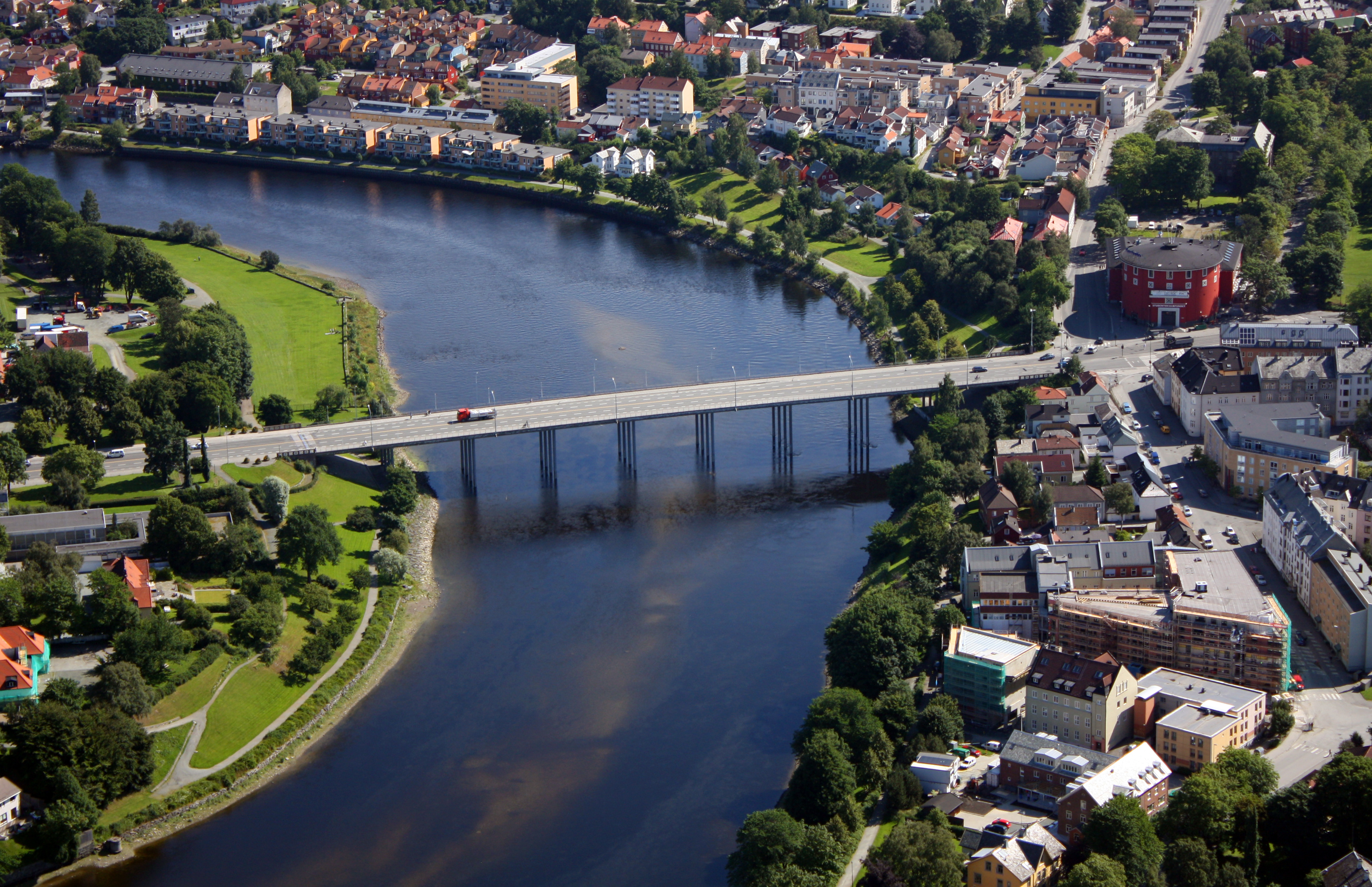
Modern view of the Elgeseter Bridge. The Singsaker Line branched off from the Elgeseter Line outside the Student Society (round red building) and headed up Klostergata.

The first proposals for a tramway to Singsaker was launched by the management of Trondhjems Elektricitetsværk og Sporvei in 1924. They proposed a route from the existing Elgeseter Line at Elgeseter Bridge via Singsaker and Rosenborg to Buran. It would have been built it in several stages, with the first terminus at Tyholtveien. The whole line was estimated to cost 1.175 million Norwegian krone (NOK). The board instead chose to wait in the hopes that the price would be reduced. A new proposal in 1926 saw a change in the plans. Instead of following Høyskolealléen, Klæbuveien and Christian Fredriks gate, the line was chosen to just follow Klostergata and Eidsvolls gate. A bus route was also considered, but it would cost NOK 96,000 more per year to operate than a tramway, thus making the whole project unprofitable. A trolleybus was also considered, but at the time there was no technical way to combine the overhead wires from both trams and trolleybuses on the same road.

The Singsaker trams would operate into the city center. The chief of operations, Fredrik Kleven, suggested that they should operate to Trondheim Central Station. Ideally he wanted them to operate to Voldsminde, but he did not want to mix trams with and without conductors on the Lade Line. Director Jon Garstad instead wanted the trams to terminate at Torvet, thus saving NOK 20,000 annually in operating costs. The board suggested that the trams run in a loop down Prinsens gate, and along Dronningens gate to Munkegata where they would connect to the existing track. This would cost NOK 52,000 to build. Alternatively, a new stop could be built at Church of Our Lady, costing an additional NOK 30,000. No-one on the board voted for the railway station alternative.

The board also wanted to introduce ten-minute headway and, unlike the other routes, remove the conductor. It was also decided to build the terminus at Ankers gate, based on studies of the number of people walking past each station. The city engineer consequently recommended building double track along the whole line. The city council approved building the line on 28 October 1926, but without double track all the way. However, the decision of where to place the terminal stop in the city was delayed. In the end, the board voted to build the line to the railway station, in part because the calculations of extra costs were not documented well enough.

Construction started on 27 April 1927. The first 900-meter (3,000 ft) was built with double track, while the last 650 m (2,130 ft) from Gudes gate to Ankers gate/Tyholtveien was built with single track. Five of the Class 2 trams were rebuilt to be single-manned. Construction was finished on 1 September, after which there was one week of trial runs before ordinary operations started on 7 September. The line cost NOK 292,600 to build.

=== First expansion ===
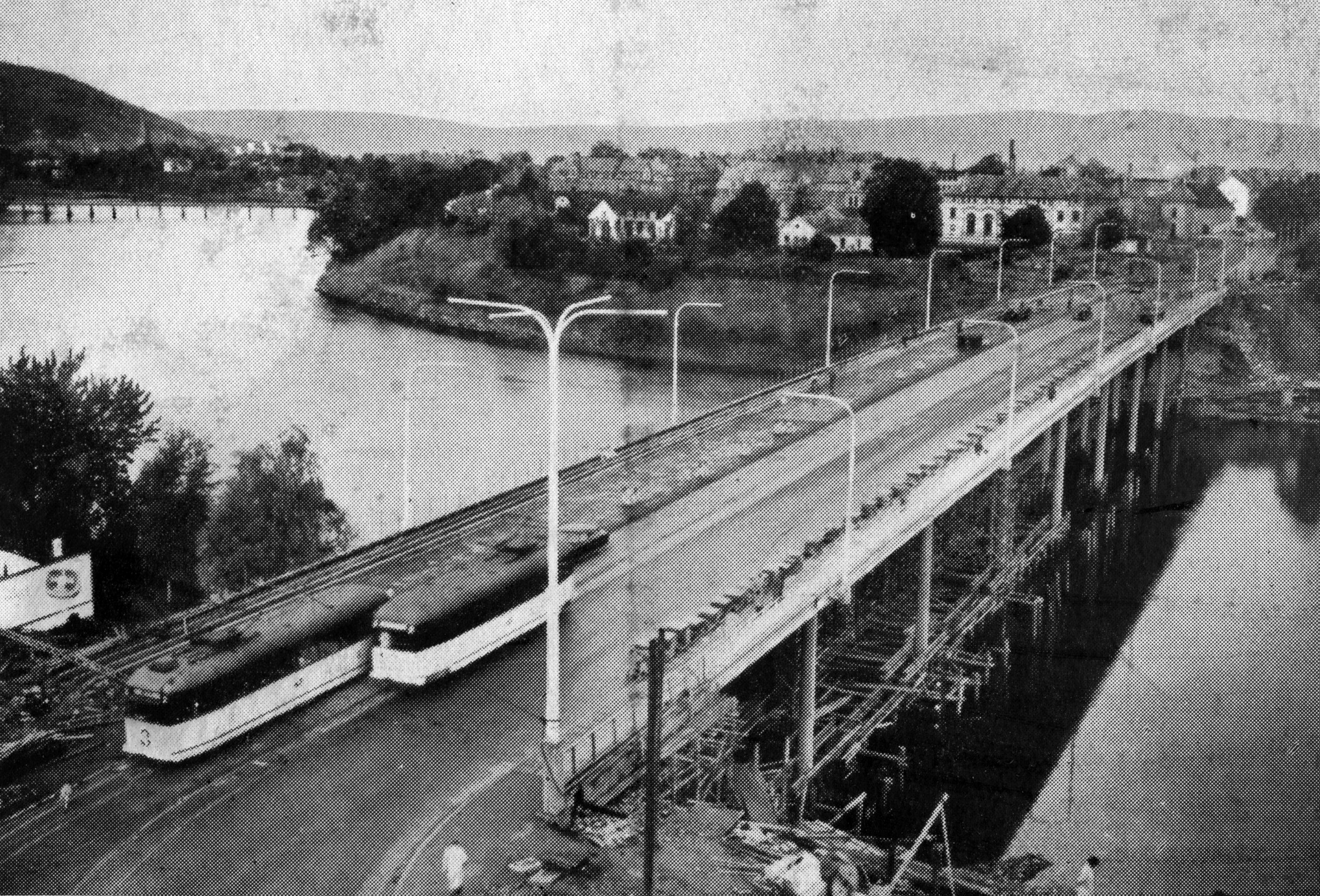
Expansion of the Elgeseter Bridge in 1951. Closest two trams at the site where the Singsaker Line branches from the Elgeseter Line

The first expansion of the line was suggested by Director Garstad in 1933, but was rejected by the board. The 400 m (1,300 ft) proposal would have expanded the line to add an additional station, Asbjørnsens gate, at the intersection of Tyholtveien, Asbjørnsens gate and Henrik Mathisens vei. The costs were estimated at NOK 65,000, and calculations showed a positive net present value. Despite that the city chief of administration was opposed to the proposal, the city council passed the expansion of 28 March 1935. This was in part based on the new Labour Party majority, who wanted to create more jobs. As part of the suggestion, the tram company had to advance the costs of rebuilding the road to the city road department. The expansion was opened on 29 September, allowing ridership to increase by 11.2 percent to 1.6 million.

The Singsaker Line had always had the lowest ridership of the three tram lines, and therefore it had been served using the oldest material—narrow cars with only wooden benches. The first Class 4 tram—no. 35—was put into service on 12 September 1952. Many people tried to time their trips into town to catch it; this could be quite difficult since there was only a one seventh chance. From December, the tram was taken out of service due to the amount of snow. This resulted in protest meetings, but the company did not have enough trams to use them on Line 3.

A group of children placed large amounts of leaves into the track on 20 October 1955 a. Tram no. 24 up Eidsvolls gate could not handle the leaves, and started sliding backwards without breaking power. The conductor tried to spread sand on the tracks, but that did not help either. The tram behind, no. 19, noticed this just after leaving Vollabakken, but dared not back up due to the traffic. There were large material damages from the impact, but no-one was seriously injured. Since the two trams were to be taken out of traffic soon, both were withdrawn.

=== Rosenborg Loop ===
The final expansion took place in 1955. To test out the ridership for the Rosenborg Loop, a bus was rented to test drive the loop from Asbjørnsens gate, down Henrik Mathiesens gate, back along Stadsingeniør Dahls gate and Festningsgata, before meeting up with the old track at Tyholtveien. The single track section from there to Gudes gate would then have to be rebuilt to double track. A proposal to run a single-tracked line onwards from Rosenborg to Buran, connecting onwards to the Lademoen Line, was discarded, as was a loop at Solhaugplatået. The Rosenborg Loop had originally been suggested by the Communist Party in 1946, and the 1.4-kilometer (0.87 mi) loop would cost just short of NOK 1 million. There were some local protests from people at Øvre Rosenborg, since they would have a longer route into town than via Buran.

Construction started during the summer of 1955. For the first time in Trondheim, the tracks were laid in asphalt instead of paving stones. New stops were built at the Teaching College and in Stadsingeniør Dahls gate at Nonnegata, outside Rosenborg School. The posted destination on the trams were not changed from Singsaker to Rosenborg, despite the extension. The Class 6 trams were chosen to be put into service, since new stock was being delivered. The loop was opened on 9 November 1955.

After the opening of the loop, the line became a much more profitable. Despite being longer, it could still be run with only seven trams; the higher speed up the Singsaker Hill allowed faster travel times. Ridership in November 1955 was up 33 percent since the previous November. Subsequently, the Solhaug bus route operated by Trondheim Bilruter had lost sufficient ridership to be terminated. During rush hour, an extra tram was put into service, decreasing the intervals from six to five minutes. Eventually trailers were also put into use. All this was despite a price increase with 50% in 1955.

After the Dalsenget fire on 10 October 1956, where all the newest trams burnt down, the Singsaker Line was again served by the oldest trams with wooden benches. This lasted until the delivery of the Class 7 trams in 1957, which were also put into service on the Singsaker Line. For the first time the line was using the newest stock the company had. In 1958, after the opening of the Lade Line, Line 2's terminus was moved from the railway station to Lade, and Line 3 became the only line to serve the railway station.

=== Decline and closure ===
The Norwegian Teaching College in Trondheim established a campus in Hanrik Mathiesens vei in 1960, giving a boost to traffic. While the Rosenborg Loop had given a huge increase in traffic, it was not sufficient to stop the decline after 1960. With the deregulation of the sales of cars, and a new, expansive city planning based on distant suburbs and motorways, the tramways in town were quickly losing market shares. Line 3 had the largest decline, and in 1961 it was losing NOK 131,000 annually. In 1962, Director Odd Hovdenak made three suggestions: 10-minute headway; removal of the conductors which had been reintroduced during World War II; or replacing the tram with buses, and at the same time changing the route to follow Nonnegata. The removal of conductors would again make the line profitable, while the reduced headway would not. Hovdenak recommended introducing buses.

Despite massive protests from local residents, Trondheim Sporvei's board chose in 1963 to follow the director's proposal, with three against two votes. A Büssing bus from Oslo Sporveier was put into service for test runs from 22 September 1966. The buses had problems keeping the schedule, but this was because they were single manned. Four such buses had been ordered by Graakalbanen, the other municipal tram company where Hovdenak also was director. Since they were a limited company, they did not neet political approval to perform such purchases. In exchange for renting the buses, Graakalbanen would rent some trams from Trondheim Sporvei. 1967 ended with a loss of NOK 340,000. Hovdenak believed that the following year would give a loss of NOK 1.6 million for tram and 1.2 million for bus operation. Line 3 had the least passenger of the three tram lines, with 2.3 million passengers annually. This was in part because it did not get more passengers when running through the city center.

The Norwegian State Railways wanted to rebuild Trondheim Central Station, and the loop at the station needed to be moved. The necessary NOK 160,000 had been put aside for this, but Hovdenak saw a possibility to use these funds to purchase buses. The oldest part of the line, from 1927 and 1935 had not yet had their tracks replaced after construction, and this was estimated to cost as much as the Rosenborg Loop. However, one of the most important reasons to switch to bus was so Trondheim Sporvei could establish itself as a bus company. With its own bus routes, it could compete for new concessions for routes when they became available. The strategy proved needless all the time Trondheim Sporvei would merge with Trondheim Bilruter—the dominant bus company—just six years later.

A so-called special committee was set to look at the matter. With five votes against one, they rejected introducing buses, pointing out that Hovdenak had too optimistic numbers for bus operation. The company was debt-free, and investments in the Singsaker Line would be a natural next step; amortized over 30 years, the upgrade would only cost NOK 59,000 annually. Overhead costs were going to be reduced by 500,000 with the last payment on the debt the same year. On the other hand, buses would inflict an immediate expense of 500,000, while there were sufficient trams to operate the route. In April 1968, the city council voted with 47 against 38 votes to close the line. This was followed second voting some time later, which gave 44 against 41 votes in favor of closing. The last trip, on 21 November 1968, was marked with an original Singsaker tram running the final run. Along with the Singsaker Line, the loop to the railway station was also abandoned. The Singsaker Line was the first part of the Trondheim Tramway to be closed.

=== Bus operation ===
The buses changed the route, and continued from Rosenborg School down Nonnegata to Olav Trygvassons gate in the city centre, but not via the railway station. This was to reduce the travel time to the city from Rosenborg. They had a five-minute headway in rush hour, and eight minutes otherwise. From 16 December the line was driven in both directions. From February 1969 the buses were forced to drive via the station due the concession; this resulted in every other bus taking the former tram route via Singsaker to the city. This gave a 15-minute headway. The other route kept a 7–8 minute headway.

In 1968, while there had been a mixed traffic of buses and trams, total ridership had been 2.1 million. In 1969, ridership had fallen to 1.6 million, a reduction of 24 percent. From 1978, the route was moved back to the old route performed by the tram, and remained unchanged as Line 63 until 2008. The headway was steadily reduced, and in the end it was at 45 minutes.

The switch at Studentersamfundet was immediately removed, but otherwise the track was to be kept, along with the loop at the railway. All other tracks were kept, though the tracks up to Tyholtveien were eventually removed. The tracks in the Rosenborg Loop were never removed, but simply asphalted over, and are still there today. Sections of the tracks can still be seen where the asphalt is thin.

== Bibliography ==
- Aspenberg, Nils Carl (1995). På meterspor i Nidaros. Oslo: Baneforlaget.
- Kjenstad, Rune (1994). På skinner i Bymarka. Oslo: Baneforlaget. ISBN 82-91448-01-9.
- Kjenstad, Rune (2005). Trikken i Trondheim 100 år. Trondheim: Tapir Akademisk Forlag. ISBN 82-519-1895-2.
- Kjenstad, Rune (2007). Singsakertrikken. Trondheim: Tapir Akademisk Forlag. ISBN 978-82-519-2231-9.
