= Hospitalløkkan Depot =

Tram depot in Trondheim, Norway

The Hospitalløkkan Depot was the first depot for the Trondheim Tramway. Built in 1901 by Trondhjems Elektricitetsværk og Sporvei, it had a capacity of 16 trams. The administration of the company was also located at Hospitalløkkan. The station was located close to the end of the Ila Line. In 1923 it was taken out of use.

== History ==
The depot was built for the opening of the Trondheim Tramway in 1901. It had a capacity of 16 trams, plus a workshop, totalling total area of 750 m^{2} (8,100 sq ft). At the time it was highly modern, with electrical lighting, central heating and water closets. Also the administration of the company was located at Hospitalløkkan.

With the extension of the Lademoen Line in 1913, as well as the ordering of the Class 2 trams, capacity was not large enough at Hospitalløkken. It became degraded to a workshop, and most of the trams were stored at the new Voldsmine Depot. In 1923, when the new Dalsenget Depot was opened, Hospitalløkkan was taken over the municipality (who owned the tramway). The building still remain, though they have been considerably rebuilt.
