= Odd Hovdenak =

Norwegian civil servant

Odd A. Hovdenak (January 13, 1917 – November 20 1982) was a Norwegian civil servant. Between 1959 and 1974 he was director of the Trondheim Tramway.

Educated in business administration, Hovdenak worked in the city administration in Trondheim from 1938. In 1953, he worked under the chief administrative officer of finance, and was acting in the position for half a year in 1959. In July 1959 he was appointed director of Trondheim Sporvei, effective from 1 September 1959. He replaced Ove Skaug, who had quite after just one year in the position.

Trondheim Sporvei owned most of the Trondheim Tramway. After the city bought the other tram operator Graakalbanen in 1966, Hovdenak was also appointed director of that company. With the merger of the two to Trondheim Trafikkselskap (TT) in 1972, Hovdenak also became director there. When TT merged with Trondheim Bilruter two years later, Hovdenak became chief financial officer.
