= Trondhjems Omnibus Aktieselskab =

Public transport provider in Trondheim, Norway

- Company type: Private
- Industry: Coach transport
- Founded: 1 May 1893
- Founder: Tobias Lund
- Fate: Bankrupt
- Headquarters: Trondheim, Norway
- Area served: Trondheim
- Revenue: 400,000 kr (1900)

Trondhjems Omnibus Aktieselskab was the first provider of public transport in Trondheim, Norway. From 1893 to 1902, it operated a horse-hauled coach service in Trondheim. Until 1901 it operated the profitable Voldsminde–Ila route, but then the Trondheim Tramway took over the route, and the company was forced to operate a less profitable route from the railway station to Øya. The company went bankrupt the following year.

== History ==
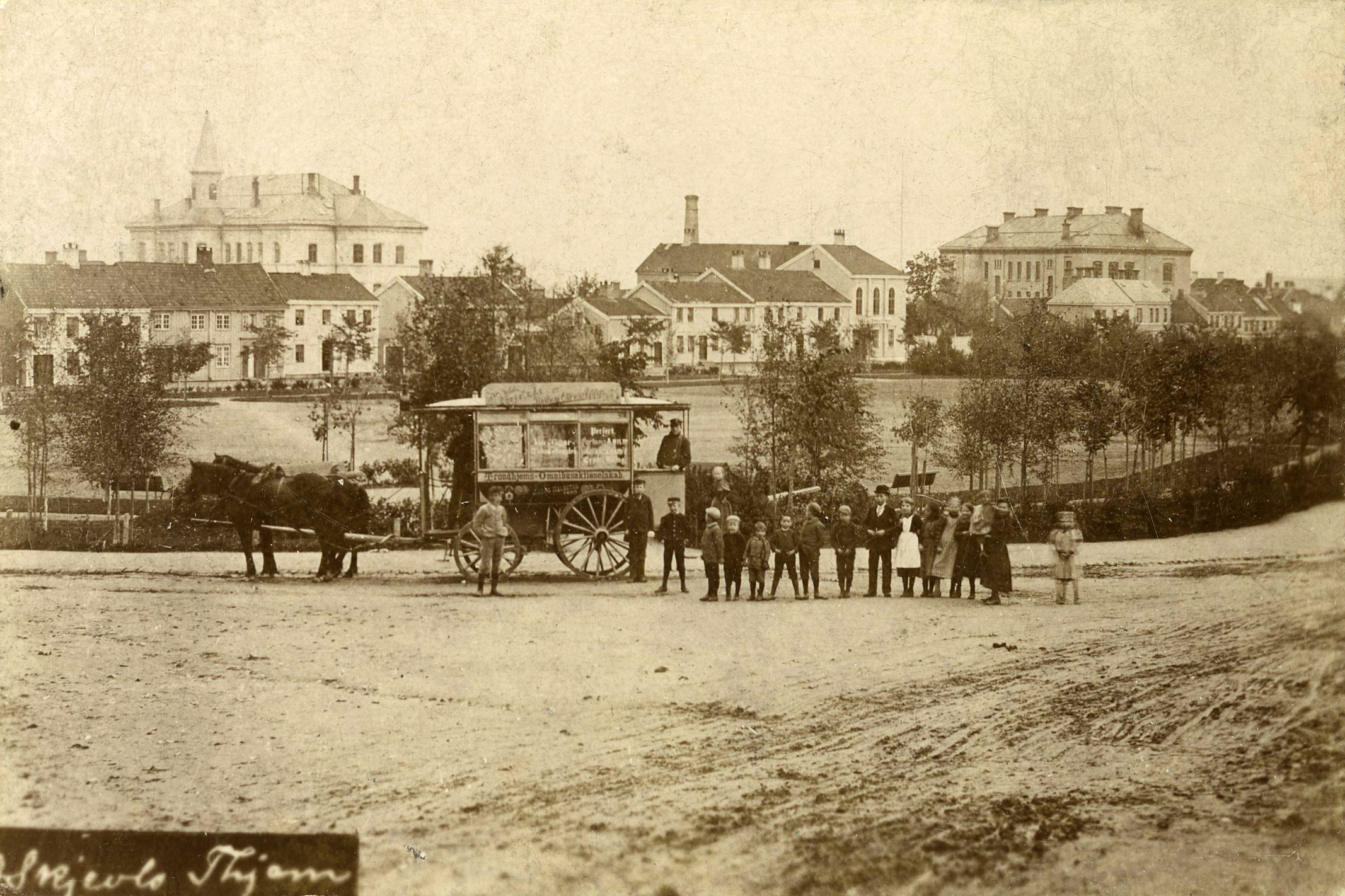
A carriage at Ilevolden

The company was founded on 1 May 1893 by several businesspeople in town, with Tobias Lund being the largest owner. With a stock capital of 20,000 kr, they bought three coaches and eight horses, as well as sledges for the winter traffic. A stable was bought at Voldsminde, on the outskirts of the city. The first route started on 9 May, from Voldsminde via Midtbyen to Ila. It cost NOK 0.10 for adults and NOK 0.05 for children. This was a quarter of the price of renting a cab for hire.

Unlike in Oslo, where Kristiania Sporveisselskab had established a horsecar service using tram tracks, Trondhjems Omnibus chose to use conventional coaches with wheels. Each carriage had places for twelve seated passengers, in addition to five standing passengers at the back. If that was filled up, an additional three places were available at the front, along with the driver. The lack of tracks made it hard work, and the horses needed to be changed for each round trip. The route went every half hour, starting at 07 in the morning, with a quarterly headway during the afternoon.

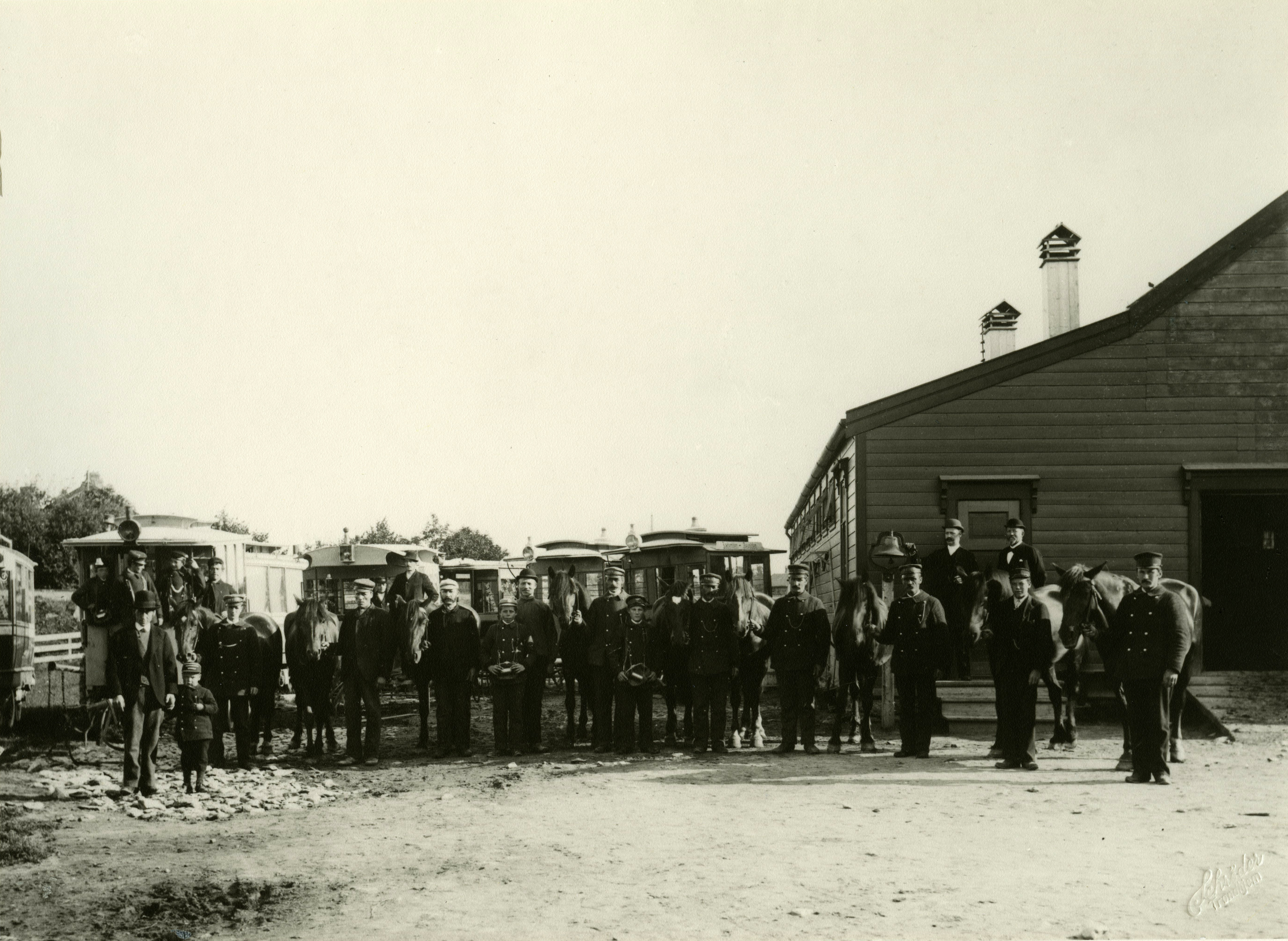
Carriages at Voldsminde

After one year, 135,000 people had taken the service, giving a 12.5% dividend. By 1900, there were 400,000 annual passengers, and a 10-minute headway. It had 26 horses and seven coaches. But in 1901 the Trondheim Tramway opened, and Trondhjems Omnibus was forced to give up the profitable Ila–Voldsminde route. Instead, it started with the 45-minute Voldsminde–Railway Station–Brattøra–Øya route, but if failed to make a profit. In 1902, it tried to start a route from Øya to the railway station. The municipality, that owned the tramway, did not accept an ultimatum to purchase shares for NOK 10,000, or give an annual subsidy of NOK 1,000. However, the company started a cooperation with the tramway company, and they made a transfer ticket for NOK 0.15. This route was not profitable either, and operations terminated in 1902.

The company also tried to start a steam bus route. It freighted up the bus Alpha from Bergen, but the bus would not work on the test run, and it was returned to Bergen after the horses had pulled it back down to Brattøra.
