= Lade Line =

Tram line in Trondheim, Norway

Coordinates: 63°26′14″N 10°25′04″E

- A tram crossing the Bakke Bridge in June 1988

Overview
- Native name: Ladelinjen
- Status: Abandoned
- Owner: City of Trondheim
- Termini: Munkegata; Lade

Service
- Type: Tramway
- System: Trondheim Tramway
- Operator: Trondheim Trafikkselskap

History
- Opened: 1901
- Closed: 1988

Technical
- Num of tracks: Single or Double
- Track gauge: 1,000 mm (3 ft 3 3/8 in)

The Lade Line (Norwegian: Ladelinjen) was a tramway between Munkegata and Lade in Trondheim Municipality, Norway, and was a route of the Trondheim tram system. The first part of the line was opened in 1901, but not expanded to Lade until 1958. The line was operated by Trondheim Sporvei and Trondheim Trafikkselskap until it was abandoned in 1988.

== History ==
The first steps of Lade Line were constructed at the same time as the Ila Line when the 3.5 km electric tram line between Ila and Buran at Lademoen opened in 1901 by the municipal Trondhjems Elektricitetsværk og Sporvei. By 1908 the headway on the line was down to 4 minutes, with the line being operated by 12 tramcars. The line was at first built as single track, but in 1913 the line was rebuilt to double track and a new depot at Voldsminde built, though the double track on Bakke Bridge was not completed until 1928. A loop was constructed at Buran in 1921 and at Voldsminde in 1936.

== Expansion ==
The first proposals to extend the Lademoen Line from Buran to Lade was launched in 1924, as part of a zoning plan for Ladehammeren. At the time, an area of 1.87 km^{2} (0.72 sq mi) was proposed served by tram. At the time, Lade was located in Trondheim's neighboring Strinda Municipality, and this was one of the reasons that the plan was never realized.

In the 1950s, Lade was served by buses operated by Trondheim Bilruter. The proposed tramway route would follow a more direct path, and some people at Ladehammeren would get a longer walk to the tram. The Lade Line was considered by the politicians on 27 June 1957, after recommendation from the board of Trondheim Sporvei, and supported with 66 votes against 9.

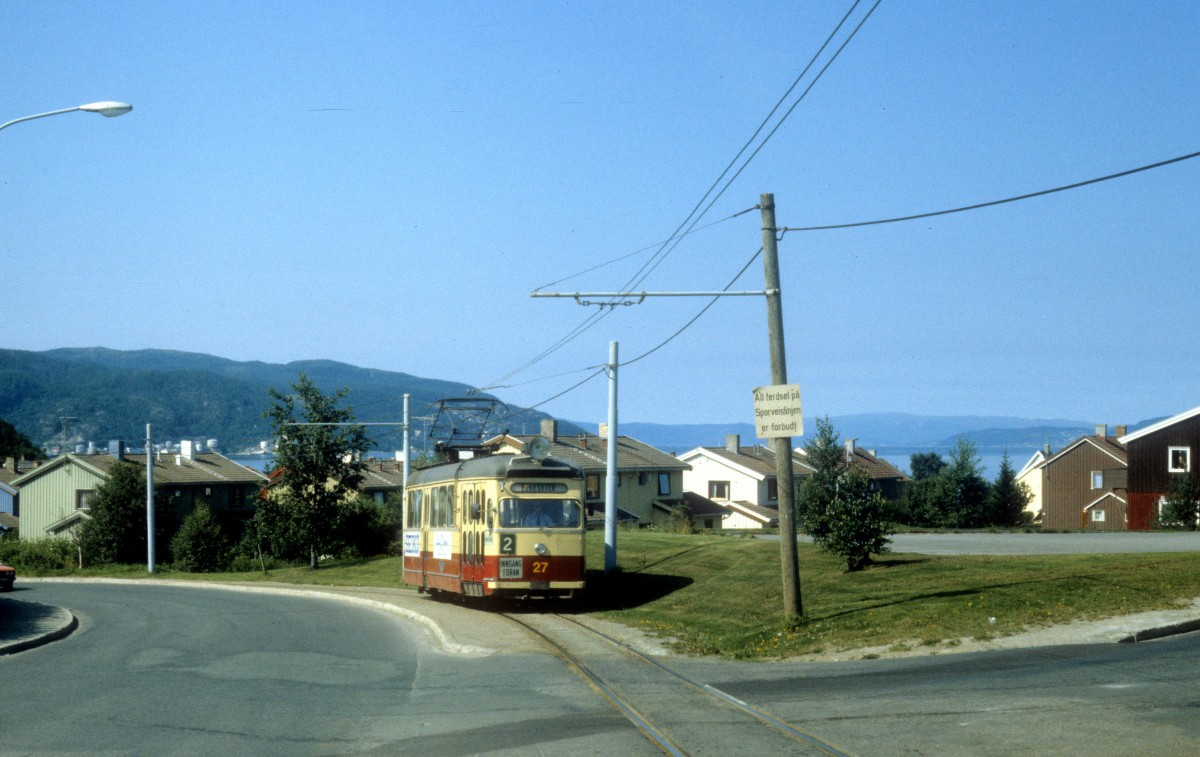
Strømmen tram 27 on line 2 eastbound in bidirectional single track on Olav Engelbrektssons on 5 August 1982. Eleven days later, this section of line 2 was taken over by line 1.

Construction started on 31 July 1957. The route would demerge from the Lademoen Line at Mellomveien, just before the Voldsminde Loop, which would be rebuilt to a four-lane road, 18 m (59 ft) wide. Until the underpass below the Meråker Line the road was named Nidarholms vei, after which it became Jarleveien. The lowering and widening of the road under the railway to allow sufficient height for the overhead wires was a costly burden on the project. A stop was placed at Stiklestadveien, and a 24 m-long (79 ft) bridge had to be built over Labekken. From there to Lade Church the line had a 5.5% gradient. The tramway was installed in the two center lanes of the road. From Lade Church, where there was a stop, the route continued west of Lade Farm along a single-track in a separate right-of-way. A passing loop and stop were located at Ringve School, before the line continued along its own right-of-way parallel to Olav Engelbrektsons allé to the terminus at Fagerheim. The city built the roads, while the catenary and the tracks were built by the tram company. The expansion was 2.1 km (1.3 mi).

One of the LHB articulated trams on Jarleveien in June 1988, nine days before the end of service

The initial plans called for line 1, from Ila, to continue to Lade. Instead it was chosen to let line 2 from Elgeseter serve the route. This meant that line 1 would still serve the Voldsminde Loop, while only line 3 would serve Trondheim Central Station. The first test runs were made on 16 November 1958, and was officially opened on 1 December at 13:00. The opening tram derailed at Fagerheim, and buses were needed as replacements for several hours. The bus company tried to operate a route via Gildheim to Ladesletta, but this was unprofitable, and abandoned after two months.

With a timetable change on 16 August 1982, line 1 was revised to run Lian–Munkvoll–city centre–Voldsminde–Lian, and line 2 Elgeseter–city centre–Lademoen. This meant that the route section between Voldsminde and Lade was served by line 1 instead of by line 2.

== Closing ==
Two trams in Fagerheim Loop, Lade terminus

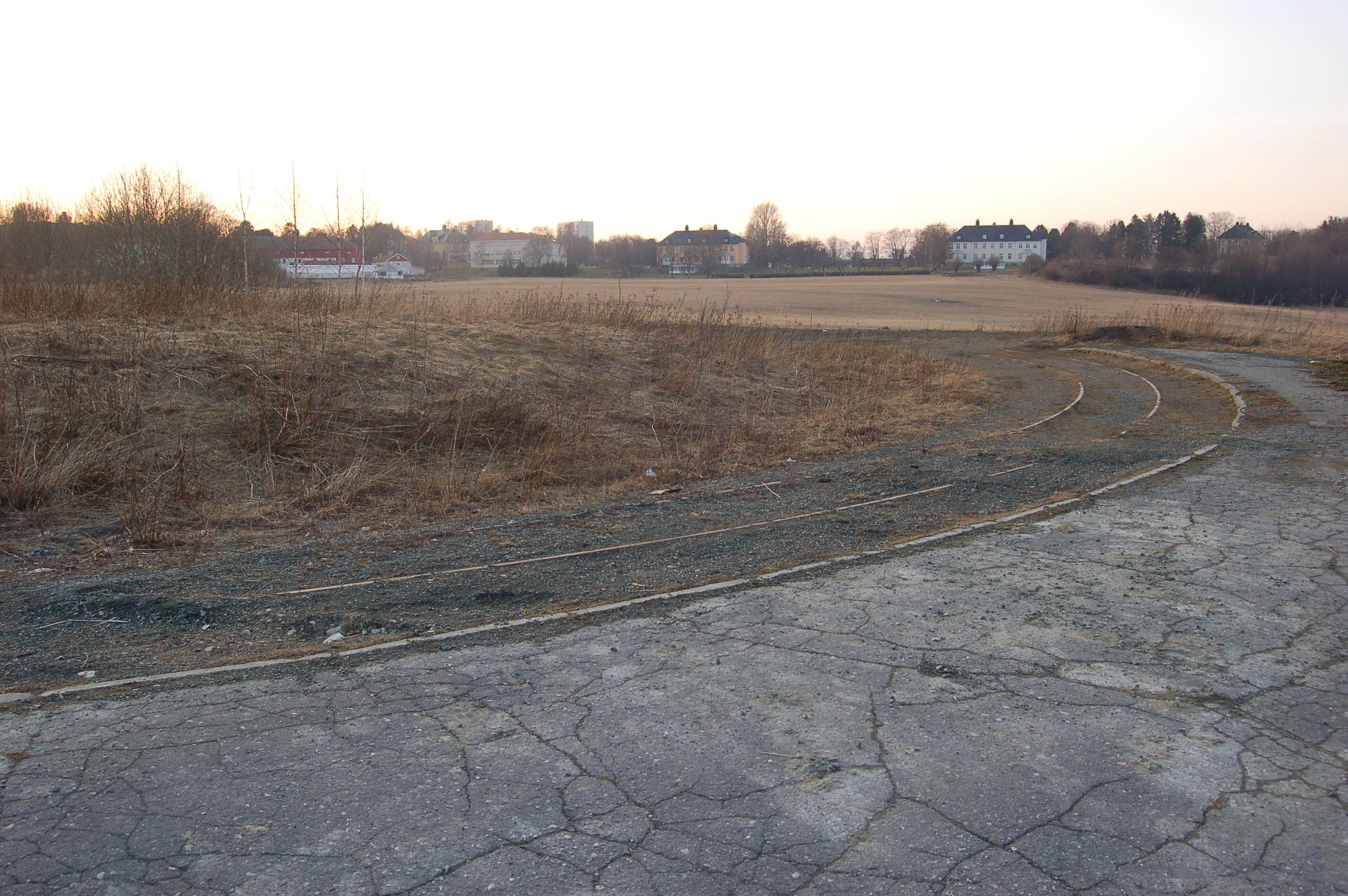
Remnants of the loop, still visible in 2007, 19 years after closure

The final fate of the Lade Line came in 1988 when the city council closed the Trondheim Tramway and replaced it with buses. The last day of tram service was 12 June 1988, and the overhead wiring was soon removed over the city centre–Lade section. The stretch between Trondheim Torg and Lade Church was demolished, but the track between the church and Fagerheim was kept for a time. When AS Gråkallbanen started operations again in 1990 it only operated the lines on the west side of town since there were no existing tracks between it and the Lade Line.
