= TS Class 4 =

Class of Norwegian trams

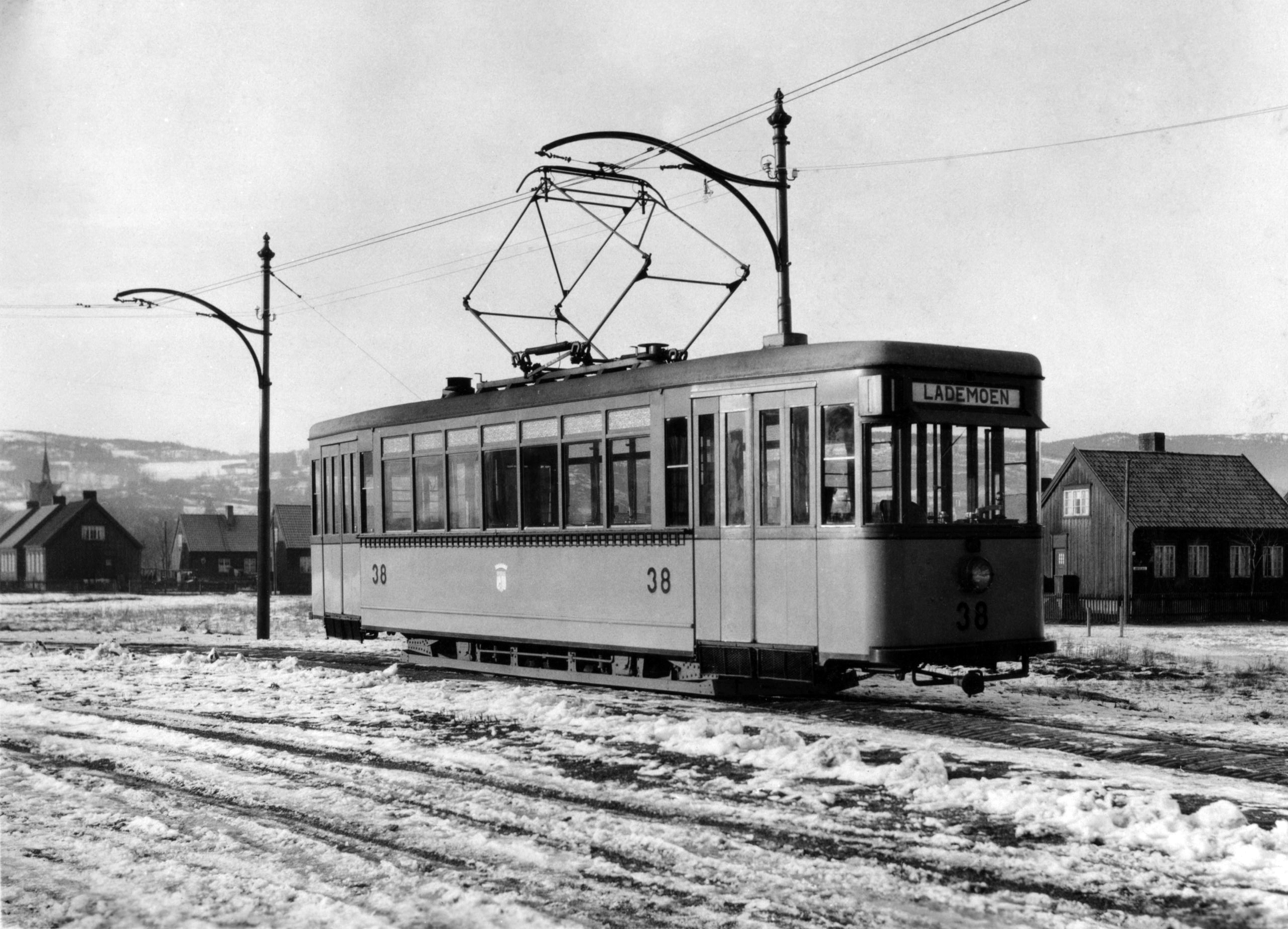

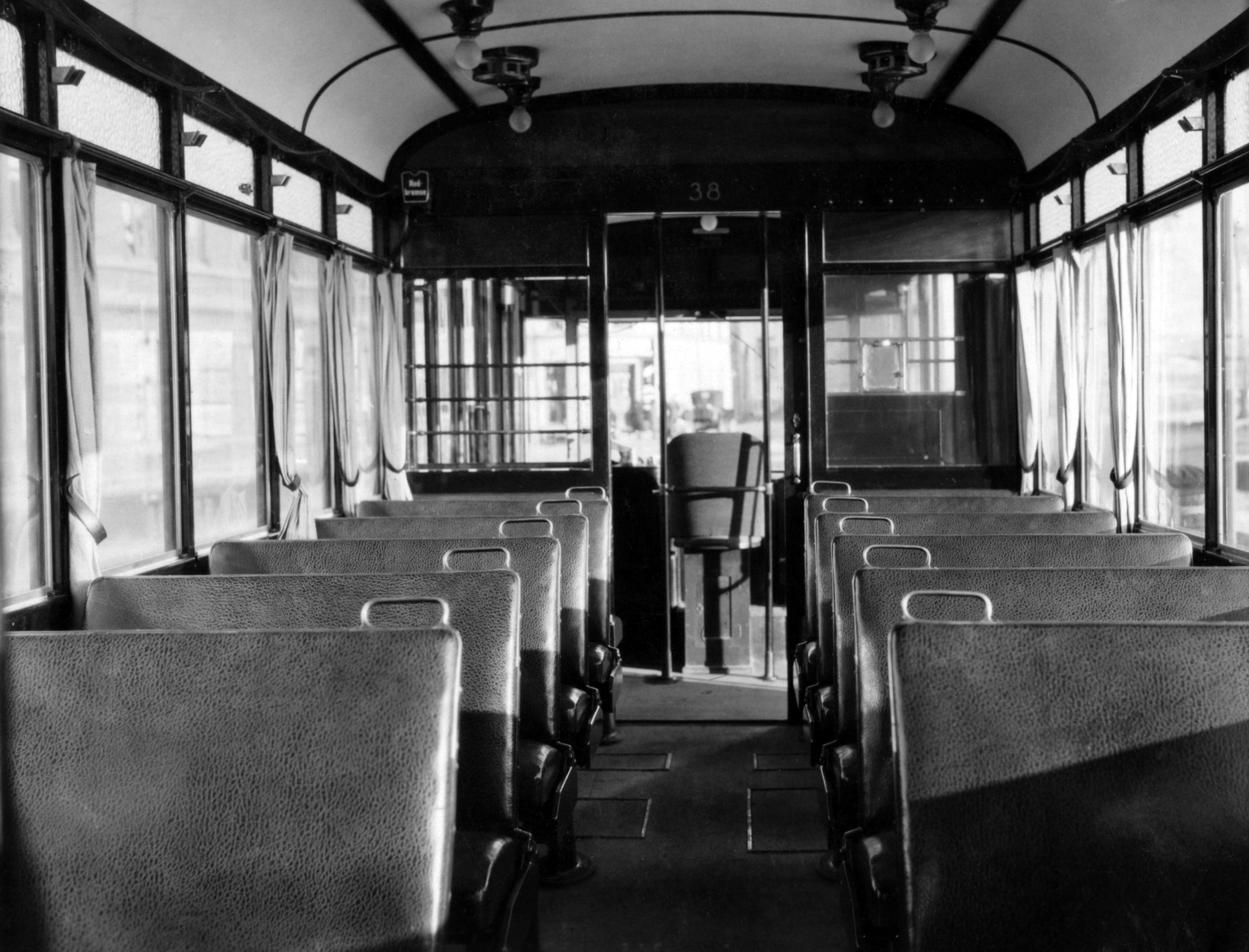
- Manufacturer: Strømmen
- Constructed: 1930
- Entered service: 1930
- Scrapped: 10 October 1956
- Number built: 5
- Number preserved: 1
- Fleet numbers: 35–39
- Capacity: 28 (seated) + 52 (standing)
- Operators: Trondheim Sporvei

Specifications
- Car body construction: Wood
- Car length: 11.0 m (36 ft 1 in)
- Width: 2.6 m (8 ft 6 in)
- Doors: 4
- Weight: 13.9 t (13.7 long tons; 15.3 short tons)
- Prime mover(s): Siemens S02
- Power output: 86 kW (115 hp)
- Electric system(s): 600 V DC
- Current collection: Pantograph
- Track gauge: 1,000 mm (3 ft 3 3/8 in)

TS Class 4 was a series of five trams built by Strømmens Værksted for Trondheim Sporvei. They were delivered in 1930, and numbered 35–39.

Each of the two Siemens motors had a power of 43 kW (58 hp). They were the first trams to have the wider 2.6 m (8 ft 6 in) bodies, that allowed four-abreast seating. They remained in service until the Dalsenget fire on 10 October 1956, in which four of the trams burnt down. No. 36 survived the fire, but fell victim to another fire not long after. No. 36 was rebuilt by Strømmen with one cab and doors in one side only, and was assigned no. 8. In 1975, it was rebuilt as a maintenance car and salt tram, and was assigned no. 47. It was taken out of service in 1982 and has been preserved at Trondheim Tramway Museum.
