= Voldsminde tram stop =

Tram stop in Lademoen, Trondheim, Norway

Voldsminde
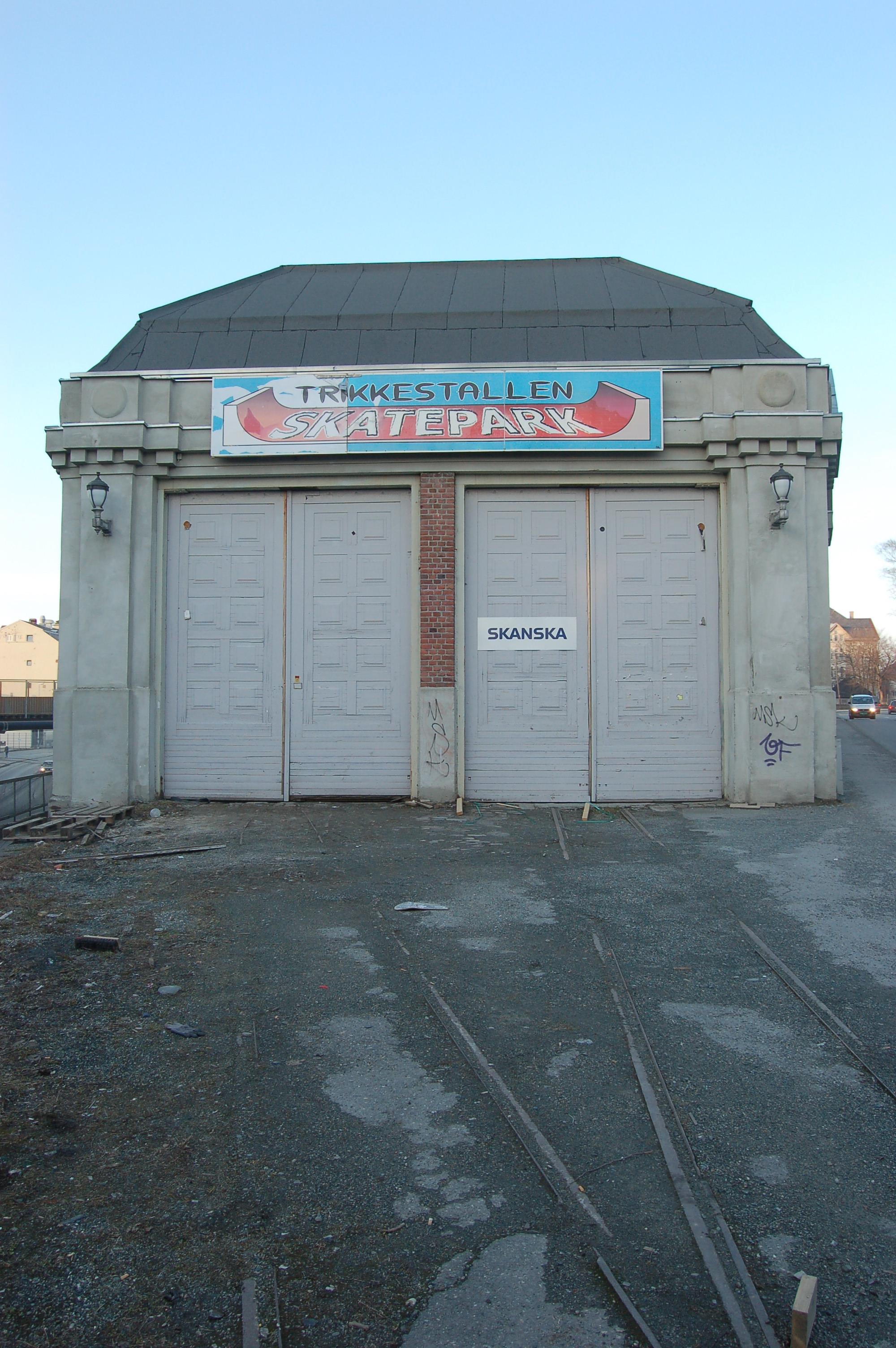
- Voldsminde depot has been converted to a skateboard park

General information
- Location: Lademoen
- Coordinates: 63°26′23″N 10°25′54″E
- Line: Ladelinjen

History
- Opened: 1936
- Closed: 1988
Location

Voldsminde was a tram stop on the Lade Line of the Trondheim Tramway. It was operational between 1936 and 1988 and was the site of a tram depot from 1913. Between 1936 and 1958 it was the terminus of the line to Lademoen.

== History ==
In 1913 the tram line to Lademoen was extended to Voldsminde and a new depot was built at the terminus.

In 1936 a loop was constructed at Voldsminde, extending the terminal station about a block. Lademoen terminus was then located on Mellomveien, just behind the depot. It became known as Voldsminde terminus in 1972, but continued to be shown as Lademoen on the destination blinds of older trams.

After the tram to Lade was abandoned in 1988, the 11 relatively new, 1984-built articulated trams were stored at the then-isolated Voldsminde Depot, because the depot is located next to the Nordland railway line.

After the trams were relocated to the Gråkallbanen, the depot was converted to a skateboard park.
