= Trondheim Tramway =

Tramway in Trondheim, Norway

Coordinates: 63°24′51″N 10°22′38″E

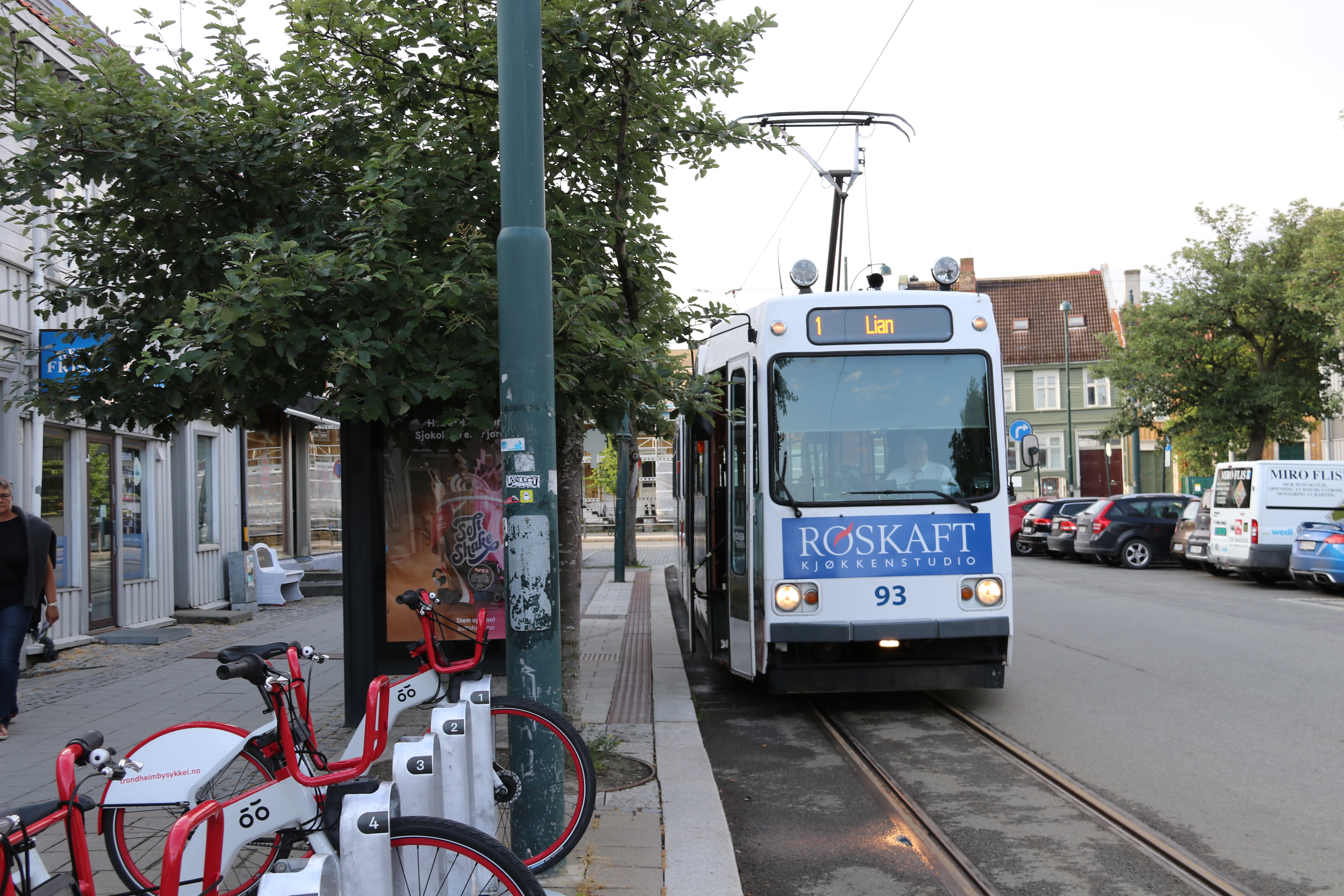
- Tram 93 at St. Olavs gate

Overview
- Locale: Trondheim, Norway
- Transit type: Tramway
- Number of lines: 1
- Number of stations: 20
- Daily ridership: 2,000

Operation
- Began operation: 2 December 1901
- Operator: Boreal Bane
- Rolling stock: TT Class 8
- Number of vehicles: 7 (including 1 in reserve)

Technical
- System length: 8.8 km (5.5 mi) (1990–)
- Track gauge: 1,000 mm (3 ft 3 3/8 in) metre gauge
- Electrification: 600 V DC overhead catenary

Trondheim tramway network

The Trondheim Tramway in Trondheim, Norway, is the world's most northerly tramway system, following the closure and dismantling of the Arkhangelsk tramways in Russia. It consists of one 8.8 km-long (5.5 mi) line, the Gråkallen Line, running from St. Olav's Gate in the city centre through Byåsen to Lian Station in Bymarka.

== Background ==
Numbered Line 9, it is operated by Boreal Bane, a subsidiary of Boreal Norge and is often simply called the Gråkallen Line (Gråkallbanen). Gråkallbanen operates six tram cars, out of a total rolling stock of seven articulated tram cars built by Linke-Hofmann-Busch in 1984. In addition heritage cars from the Trondheim Tramway Museum are available for chartered tours.

The tram operates at a 15-minute headway in the daytime on weekdays, and partly on Saturdays, otherwise at a 30-minute headway. The line has 20 stations remaining in use. The tram service is integrated into the city bus system with free transfers. The overall responsibility for public transport in Trondheim is managed by Sør-Trøndelag county municipality, who subsidize the operations.

Previously, there were three lines in Trondheim, including Ladelinjen to Lade and Singsakerlinjen to Singsaker in addition to tracks to Ila, Elgeseter, Trondheim Central Station and Lademoen. The line to Singsaker was closed in 1968 while the rest of the network was closed in 1983 and 1988, though the line to Lian was reopened in 1990.

Since 2004, the tramway has been the most northern in the world, following the closure of the Arkhangelsk tram system on 21 July 2004. Trondheim is also unique in that it is one of two rail lines in Norway built to metre gauge 1,000 mm (3 ft 3 3/8 in) (along with the heritage railway Thamshavnbanen), and since the closure of the Cairo tramways in 2019 is the only tramway in the world to use 2.6 m-wide (8 ft 6 in) cars in combination with metre gauge.

== History ==
=== Establishment ===
Trondheim introduced its first horse-drawn coach service in 1893, operated by Trondhjems Omnibus Aktieselskab. The horses trotted between Buran and Ila via the city center until 1901, and transported more than 400,000 passengers in the peak year. Unlike Oslo and Bergen, Trondheim never had horsecars. In 1900, the city council decided to establish a municipally owned power and tramway company, Trondhjems Elektricitetsværk og Sporvei. It took over the concession for the Ila–Lademoen route, and opened the 3.5 km (2.2 mi) Ila Line and Lademoen Line on 2 December 1901. The coach company went bankrupt the following year, failing to make money on a route to Øya.

While initial plans had called for standard gauge, NOK 10 000 could be saved if metre gauge was used, resulting in the narrower gauge being chosen. To begin with, the whole line was single track, with passing loops in Wessels gate, Bakkegaten, Kjøpmannsgaten, Nordre gate, Torvet, Tordenskjolds gate and Skansen. The Hospitalløkkan Depot on the Ila Line had space for 16 trams. Eleven Class 1 trams were delivered by Siemens, with another delivered in 1903. The line opened with a six-minute headway, but this was soon reduced to five minutes, and to four minutes in 1908. Four trailers were delivered in 1904. In the first full year, 1.6 million passengers took the tram, and by 1913 patronage had reached 4.3 million per year.

=== Expansion ===
In 1909, the city council decided to upgrade the network. Completed in 1913, the city rebuilt the line to double track, supplementing it with the new 2.5 km (1.6 mi) Elgeseter Line between Elgeseter and the railway station. The Lademoen line was extended 400 m (1,300 ft) from Buran to Voldsminde, where a new depot was built. The four Class 2 trams were delivered to meet the increased total route length, while older trams were put into service on the Elgeseter Line.

Ridership continued to grow, especially after World War I started, and there was more money around. In 1915, five additional Class 2 trams were bought. In 1919, the company carried 13.9 million passengers. In 1918, eight used horsecars were bought from Oslo Sporveier and converted to metre gauge and modified for use as trailers towed by electric trams. Ten new trams of Class 3 were delivered in 1922. To create enough overnight space for all the new trams, a third depot was built at Dalsenget, and the Elgeseter Line was extended to there in 1923. New turning loops were also built at Ilevolden and Voldsminde in 1921. Passing loops were built at the railway station in 1928 and at Dalsenget in 1949. Bakke Bridge was rebuilt in 1928 so the last part of the Lademoen Line had double track.

After a study trip to the United States in 1916, Director Fredrik Kleven made the observation that wider vehicles were in use there. He brought the idea back to Trondheim, and the company made a policy to increase the distance between the tracks of a double line to allow wider 260 cm (100 in) cars to be put into service. This would allow four-abreast seating, and much higher capacity than with the existing stock. Five new Class 4 wide trams were delivered in 1930, after the Ila and Lademoen Lines had been rebuilt. Graakalbanen had brought trams of this width into use in 1924 along the Ila Line.

By 1927, the 1.5 km-long (0.93 mi) new Singsaker Line was constructed, leaving the Elgeseter Line at Studentersamfundet and heading to Ankers Gate in Singsaker. A further 400 m (1,300 ft) expansion to Asbjørnsens Gate was completed in 1935.

=== Gråkallen Line ===
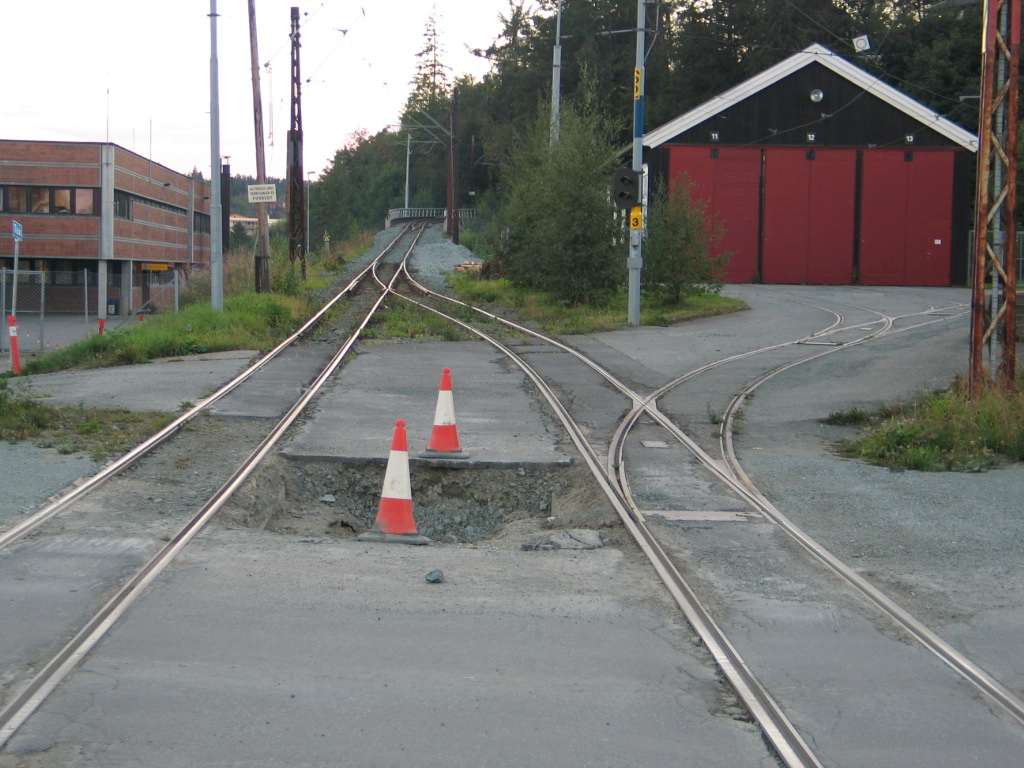
The new and old depot at Munkvoll on the Gråkallen Line

The first steps to building a tramway in Byåsen were taken in 1916 when A/S Graakalbanen was founded to build a tramway from the City Centre via Byåsen to the mountain Gråkallen. The first stretch to be opened was from St. Olav's gate to Munkvoll on 18 July 1924, after construction work lasting seven years. The line was extended to Ugla on 30 May 1925 and in 1933 to the present terminus at Lian. The financing of the first two stretches of the line was done through the company purchasing land from along the line and selling it for housing. The last stretch was financed through a separate company, A/S Ugla-Lian, that built the line and received 5 øre per rider on the line. The peak of Gråkallbanen was during World War II when the line had 2 million passenger annually - the trams were the only transport system operational during the war. After the war, new investments were made, including loops in the city (1946) and at Lian (1947), double track from Breidablikk to Nordre Hoem (1948) and a new depot and workshop at Munkvoll in 1953. A/S Graakallbanen was bought by the city in 1966.

=== Steady growth ===
The depression caused a reduction in ridership, but during the 1930s patronage began increasing again. In 1936, the Voldsminde Loop was built at the end of the Lademoen Line. In 1937, four Class 5 trams were put into service. During World War II the passenger numbers peaked at 35.5 million annually. During the war, all trams and trailers which had been put aside were returned to service. Five trailers were delivered in 1942, but the following year the German occupation forces confiscated three trams with trailers, and transferred them to the Mannheim Tramway in Germany.

After the war ended, the requisitioned trams were bought back from Mannheim. Ten Class 6 trams were delivered in 1948–49, while an additional, slightly different vehicles were delivered in 1955. Between 1949 and 1955, all the Class 2 and 3 trams were retired — Trondheim became one of the first cities in Europe to completely abandon two-axle trams, though the older trailers remained in service. In 1955, three second-hand trailers were bought from Belgium. In 1949, a new bridge was built between Søndre gate and the railway station, and for a short period lines 2 and 3 terminated at Søndre Gate. The Elgeseter Bridge on the Elgeseter Line was rebuilt to a six lanes in 1951. The Singsaker Line was extended 1.4 km (0.87 mi) in 1955 with the Rosenborg Loop, which ran to Rosenborg. Three years later, in 1958, the 2.65 km (1.65 mi) Lade Line was built from Lademoen to Lade. The outer half of this stretch was the only part of the tramway system built as single track and to be not located in the street.

=== Fire ===
At night on 10 October 1956, the Dalsenget Depot caught fire, destroying almost all of the modern tram fleet. 26 trams, 16 trailers and one working tram were destroyed, and three cleaners lost their lives. It was the then-largest fire in Trondheim after World War II. One tram and trailer survived from within the fireproof paint shop. Trondheim Sporvei had never discarded its old trams - they were stored at Voldsminde Depot - and eleven old trams were in service within the day. In addition, eight buses were borrowed from Oslo within the week. Damage was tallied at NOK 9 million, of which 8 million was for the rolling stock. A proposal to replace the tramway with trolleybuses was discarded by the city council. The depot was rebuilt, and 28 new Class 7 trams were ordered, in addition to 15 trailers. The bogies and motors were salvaged, and reused in the new trams. The new stock was delivered in 1957 and 1958.

=== Closing and reopening ===
A Class 8 tram eastbound in Olav Tryggvasons gate, bound for Lade

Between 1958 and 1968 the tram network of Trondheim was at its peak, and had four lines:

- Line 1: Ilevolden – Torvet – Lademoen
- Line 2: Elgeseter – Torvet – Lade
- Line 3: Singsaker – Torvet – Jernbanen
- Graakalbanen: Lian – St. Olavs Gate

In 1968, the Singsaker Line and the branch line from Søndre Gate to Trondheim Central Station were closed and replaced by buses (Line 63). The main argument at the time was that a tram required both a driver and a conductor, while a bus only required a driver, thus lowering the operational costs. This development was partially driven by the removal of regulations on car ownership in Norway in 1960, resulting in an explosion in the use of cars in Trondheim and thus falling passenger numbers on the trams. The tracks were simply paved over, and still exist under the streets. At the time of the closure Line 3 was operating at a 5-minute headway with 2.3 million passengers. One year after the buses had taken over the passenger numbers had dropped 30%, and the consequence was fewer and fewer bus departures resulting in fewer passengers. Ultimately, the headway was lengthened to 45 minutes. In 1974, the three public transport companies in Trondheim, all three owned by the city, were merged to create Trondheim Trafikkselskap (now Team Trafikk, part of Nettbuss).

However, the most troubled era for the tram service in Trondheim was in the 1980s, when the future of the system was one of the hottest political issues in Trondheim, resulting in several mayors having to leave office. The debate about the future of the trams had been going on through the late 1970s, in general with the left side of the city council supporting the tramway while the right side wanted to close the system. After the city council election in 1979 the Progress Party gained its first representative on the city council, Hildur Karstensen, who was a tram driver for TT. Though the Conservative mayor, Axel Buch, was expected to be re-elected, Kristiansen chose to support the Labour candidate Olav Gjærevoll, in the hope that a socialist majority would ensure the future of the trams, and thus making Gjærevoll mayor.

A tram inbound on the Lade Line crossing the Bakke Bridge in June 1988, nine days before the tramway's closure

Two years later though, the Labour Party had definitively changed its side in the tram debate, and chose an alliance with the Conservatives, creating a Labour-Conservative alliance with Anne-Kath. Parow (Labour) as mayor and Axel Bush as vice-mayor. In 1982, the future of the tram system was again taken up in the city council, and this time the Socialist Left Party (SV) chose to support closure of the tram lines. The first time the decision was taken by the council, SV chose to support the closure, preventing two of its members from voting against. But then the tram's future was the subject of a second vote, and the two disagreeing members of SV chose to vote against the closure of the tram line, and thus the city council voted to keep the trams, with 44 vs. 41 votes. The city council decided at the same time to build a new depot at Munkvoll and purchase 11 new trams, at a cost of NOK 100 million. The opposition claimed that it would be cheaper to operate the line with diesel buses. But the compromise also meant that the least-robust part of the tramway was to be discontinued; thus, the only line to survive after 1983 would be Lian–Lade.

With a timetable change on 16 August 1982, line 1 was revised to run Lian–Munkvoll–city centre–Voldsminde–Lian, and line 2 Elgeseter–city centre–Lademoen. Less than a year later, the line to Elgeseter (now terminating in the east at Lademoen instead of Lade) was closed, the last day of service being 11 June 1983, and the terminus loop to Lademoen was taken out of service.

By 1987, the tramway's existence was threatened again, despite a new party, Bylista, having been established to fight for the existence of the tram. Before the 1987 election, the city council voted to close the entire tramway network in the city in 1988. The entire network was removed in the city core and to Elgeseter and Lademoen. The tram tracks and wires to Lian and Lade (which were not in the streets, except a portion of the Lade line) were not removed, but the overhead wires between the city centre and Lade were removed soon after the closure, rendering the tracks no longer usable on that section. In 1989, there was another mayoral election for the city council, and Bylista chose not to support the present mayor Per Berge (Labour) and instead chose to support the Conservative candidate Marvin Wiseth, who was willing to allow a private company to operate the trams.

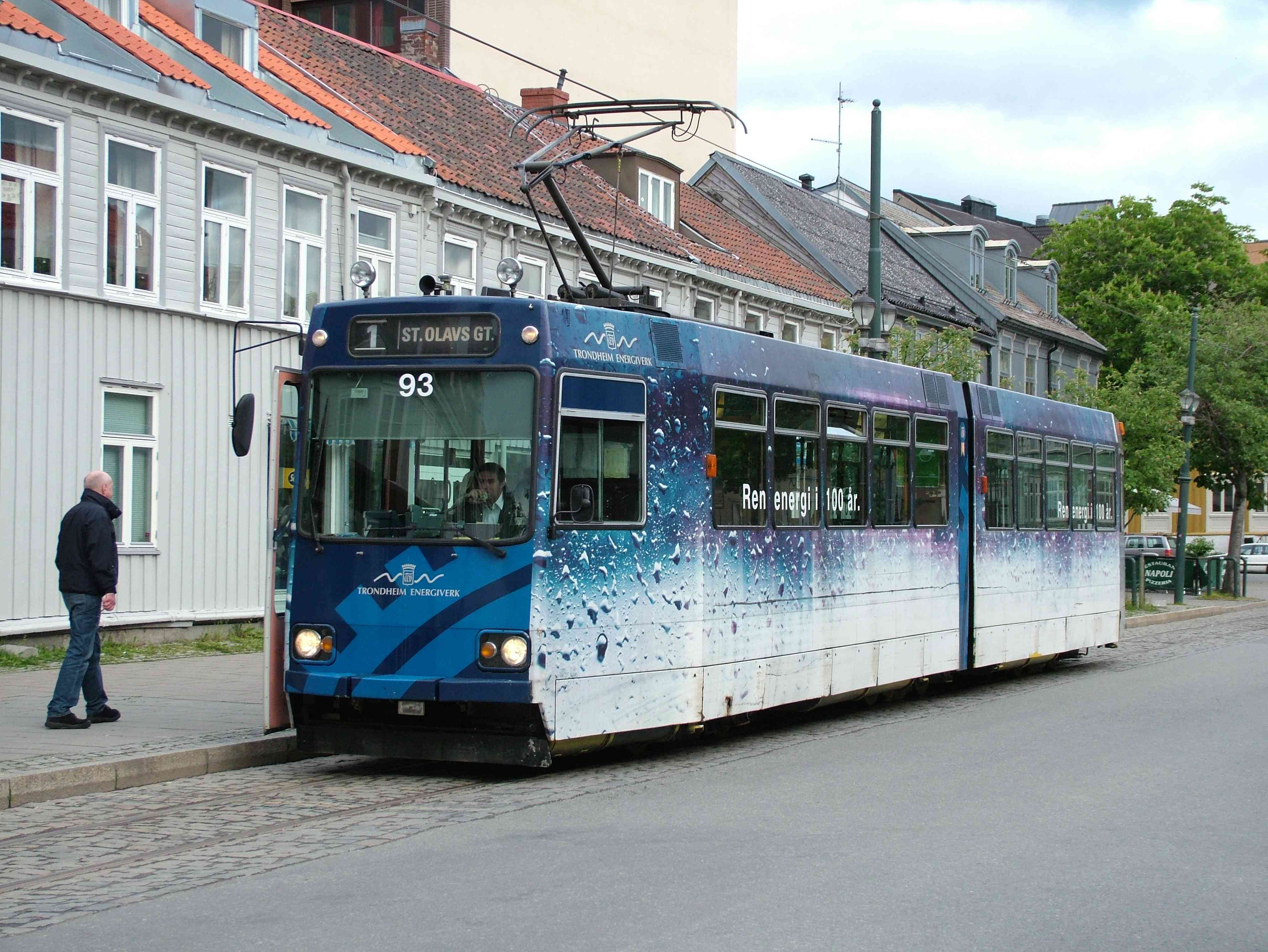
A tramcar at St. Olavs Gate on the Gråkallbanen in 2005

After the political deal securing the tramway's operation, a new company, AS Gråkallbanen, was established to operate the tram line from St. Olav's Gate to Lian. The company was owned by 1400 local idealists who wanted the tram to survive. AS Gråkallbanen only operated the one line. In 2005 the company was bought by Veolia Transport Norge.

== Future expansion ==
Advocates for the trams have suggested extending the tramway from its present terminus at St. Olav's Gate through the city core to Trondheim Central Station or Nedre Elvehavn and onwards to Brattøra and Trondheim Port. This has been supported by the city council, but no definite decision has been made. Estimates of costs lay between kr 50 and 80 million, with completion in 2009 at the same time as Nordre Avlastningsvei.

A plan to extend the network by building a line from Munkvoll to the new Byåsen Upper Secondary School was dropped in 2004 after heated political debate.

== Rolling stock ==
The tramway uses 7 TT Class 8 trams, out of the 11 that were originally delivered. Out of the 7, 6 are in active service (Units 93, 94, 95, 96, 97, and 99) and 1 is a reserve unit (no. 90).
