= TS Class 2 =

Class of Norwegian trams

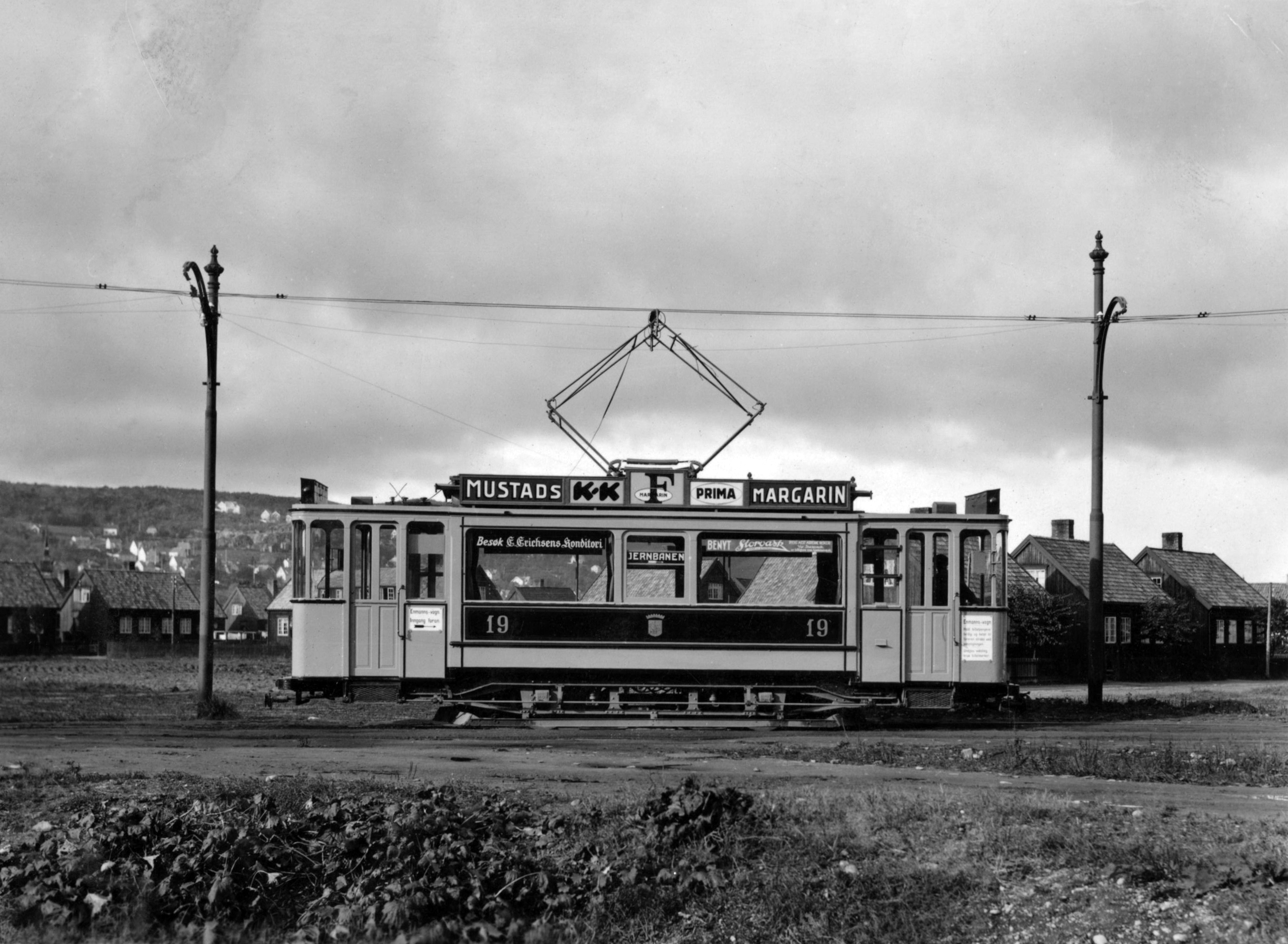

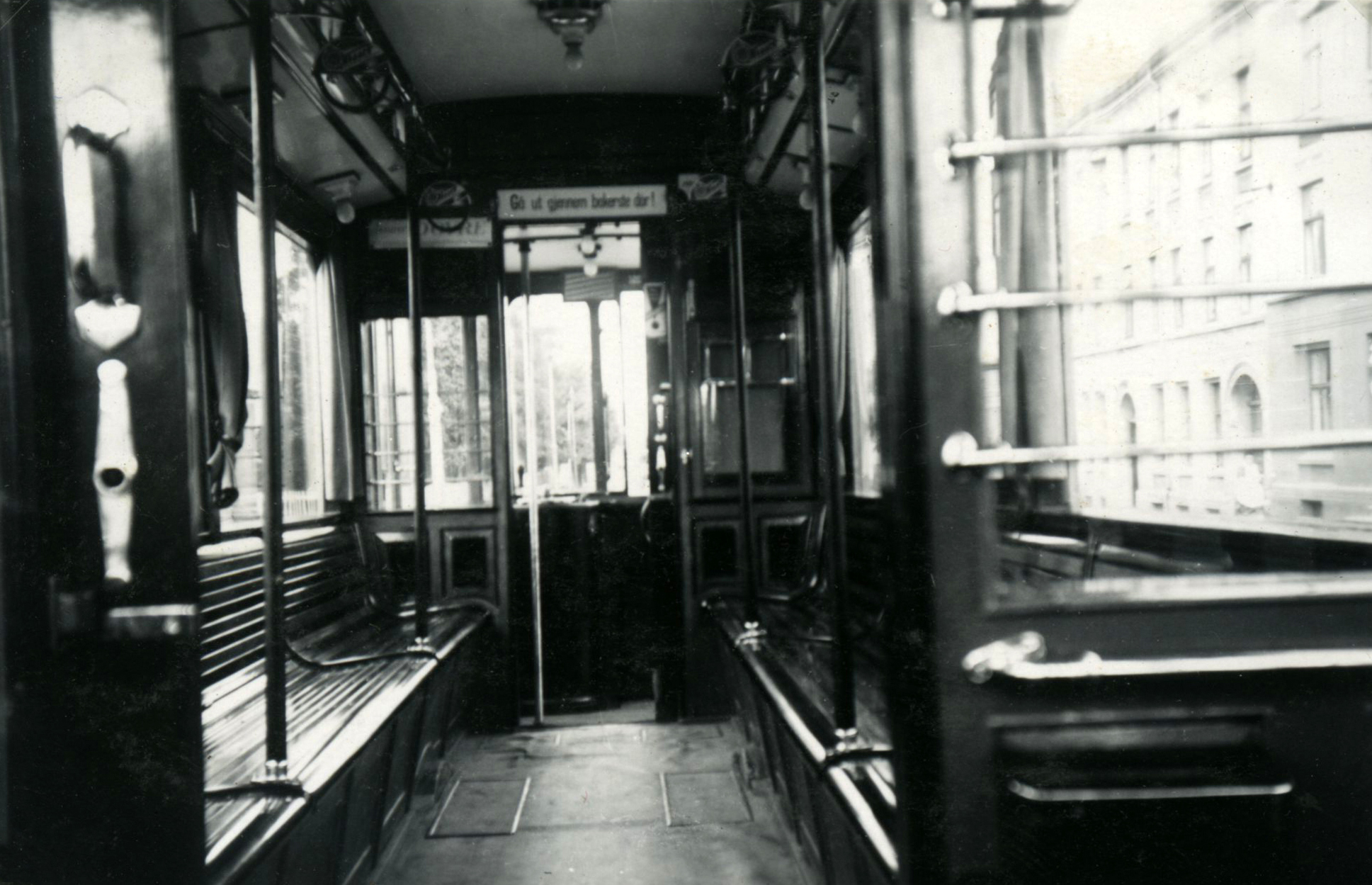
- Manufacturer: Skabo
- Constructed: 1913–17
- Entered service: 1913
- Scrapped: 1956–75
- Number built: 12
- Number preserved: 1
- Fleet numbers: 13–24 (trams)
- Operators: Trondheim Sporvei

Specifications
- Car body construction: Wood
- Car length: 7.4 m (24 ft 3 in)
- Width: 2.0 m (6 ft 7 in)
- Doors: 4
- Weight: 11.7 t (11.5 long tons; 12.9 short tons)
- Prime mover(s): Siemens D58W/9
- Power output: 66 kW (89 hp)
- Electric system(s): 600 V DC
- Current collection: Pantograph
- Track gauge: 1,000 mm (3 ft 3 3/8 in)

TS Class 2 was a series of twelve trams built by Skabo Jernbanevognfabrikk for Trondheim Sporvei. They were delivered between 13 September 1913 and November 1917, and used on the newly opened Elgeseter Line.

Each of the two Siemens motors had a power of 33 kW (44 hp). They had a single compartment, with outdoor platforms at each end. They made up part of the old 2.0 m (6 ft 7 in) wide trams, with benches along the length of the cars. They remained in service until 1955, but after the Dalsenget fire the following year, ten of the trams were taken back into use until the Class 7 trams were delivered. Scrapping started in 1956, and lasted until 1975. Two unit are still preserved at Trondheim Tramway Museum.

In 1918, eight used horsecar trailers bought used from Kristiania Sporveisselskap. Numbered 55–62, they were used during World War I and World War II to handle the increased ridership. Three were scrapped in 1922, while the rest were sold in 1945. One has been preserved.
