= Trondhjems Elektricitetsværk og Sporvei =

- Type: Municipally owned
- Industry: Transport and Energy
- Founded: 1901
- Defunct: 1936
- Successor: Trondheim Energiverk; Trondheim Sporvei
- Headquarters: Trondheim, Norway
- Area served: Trondheim, Norway
- Products: Electricity production Electricity distribution Tram operation
- Parent: City of Trondheim

Trondhjems Elektricitetsværk og Sporvei was a municipally owned power company and tram operator in Trondheim, Norway between 1901 and 1936 when the company was split in Trondheim Energiverk (TEV) and Trondheim Sporvei. The company was founded on November 4, 1901, to build a hydro electric power plant at Øvre Leirfoss and the Trondheim Tramway that replaced the old horse omnibus service from 1893.

Through the company the tramway in Trondheim was expanded to Elgeseter with Elgeseterlinjen in 1913 and to Trondheim Central Station. The company was organised as a municipal agency. Today both the successors of the company are owned by the Government of Norway with TEV being a subsidiary of Statkraft while Trondheim Sporvei now is part of Team Trafikk, a subsidiary of Nettbuss.
