= Trondheim Bilruter =

Norwegian bus company

Trondheim Bilruer A/L
- Company type: Municipally owned
- Industry: Transport
- Founded: 1951
- Defunct: 1974
- Headquarters: Trondheim, Norway
- Area served: Trondheim, Norway
- Key people: (CEO)
- Products: Bus operation
- Parent: City of Trondheim

Trondheim Bilruter or TBR was a municipally owned bus company in Trondheim, Norway between 1951 and 1974. It was merged with the tram operators Trondheim Sporvei and A/S Graakalbanen in 1974 to form Trondheim Trafikkselskap. It is now part of Team Trafikk, a subsidiary of Nettbuss.

The predecessor of the company was Autobuss, a privately owned bus company that started bus operations in Trondheim in 1929. Trondheim Bilruter did not have a monopoly on bus operation in the city. The tram operator Trondheim Sprovei operated some bus lines, and TBR only operated buses within the city limits. The buses operated by TBR were painted dark red or grey.

Arne Watle was hired as CEO of Trondheim Bilruter in 1951, and also became CEO of Trondheim Trafikkselskap after the merger. He was replaced by Jan Reinås in 1983.
