= Trondheim Sporvei =

Tram operator in Trondheim, Norway

- Type: Municipally owned
- Industry: Transport
- Founded: 1936
- Defunct: 1974
- Headquarters: Trondheim, Norway
- Area served: Trondheim, Norway
- Products: Tram operation
- Parent: City of Trondheim

Trondheim Sporvei was a municipally owned tram operator in Trondheim, Norway that existed between 1936 and 1974. The company operated the municipal parts of the Trondheim Tramway until it was merged with A/S Graakalbanen and Trondheim Bilruter to create Trondheim Trafikkselskap. That company has become part of Nettbuss, the largest Norwegian bus company in Norway which is owned by Norwegian State Railways (Norges Statsbaner AS).

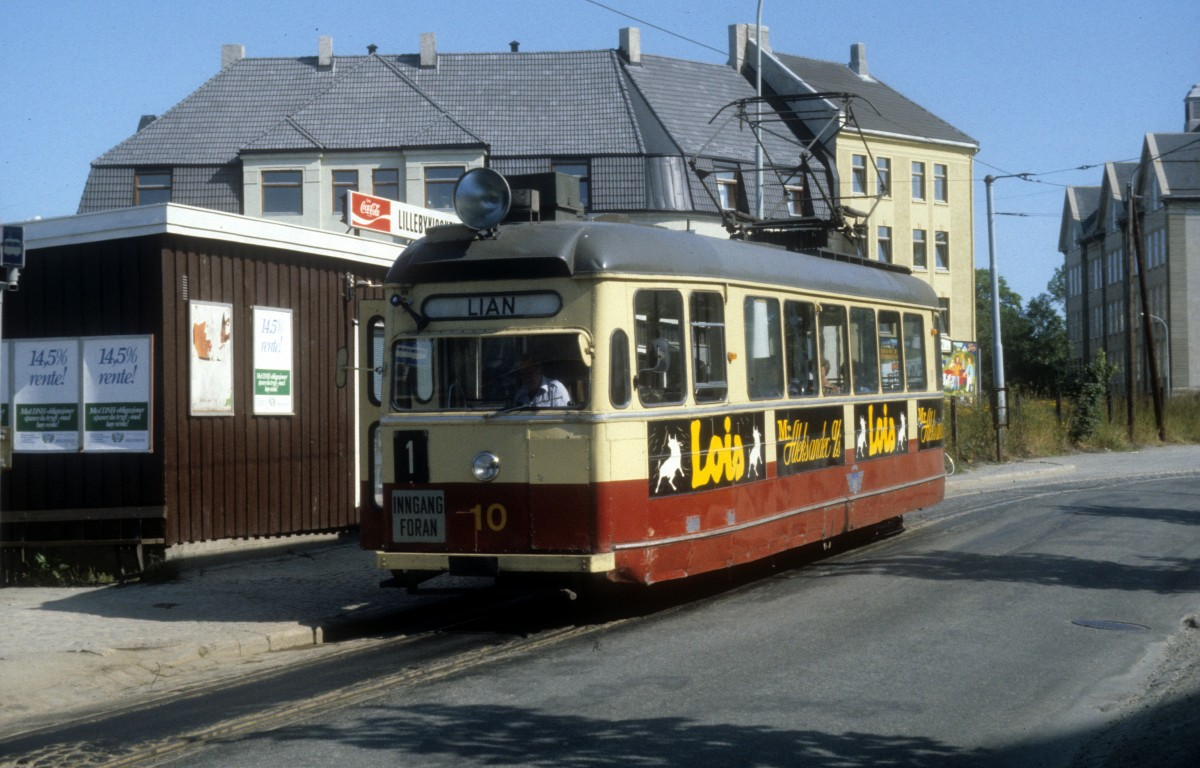
A Strømmen tram of Trondheim Sporvei

== History ==
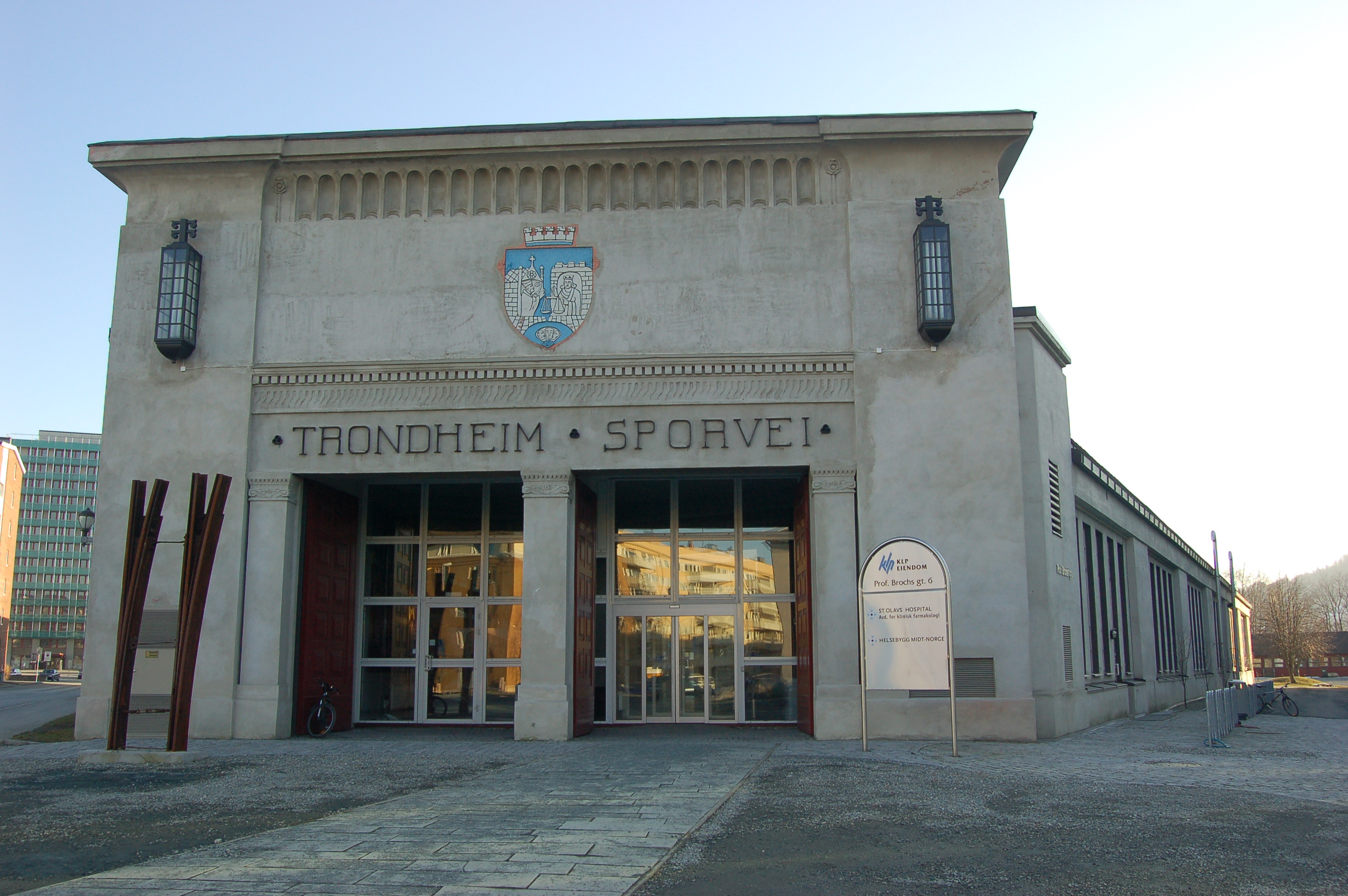
The former Trondheim Sporvei depot at Dalsenget

The tramway in Trondheim was started in 1901 and replaced a horse omnibus service from 1893. The city council established Trondhjems Elektricitetsværk og Sporvei to build and operate the tramway. In 1936 the two companies were split, with Trondheim Energiverk, the other half of the company specialising as a power company.

Trondheim Sporvei operated three lines, including the original Ila Line and also built Elgeseter Line (1913), Lade Line (1901 and 1958) and Singsaker Line (1923), but not the Gråkallen Line that was run by the private A/S Graakalbanen. In 1966 though the city bought Graakalbanen and merged it with Trondheim Sporvei in 1971. In the later years Trondheim Sporvei also operated some buses, including the ones used on the closed Line 3. The company's buses were painted blue upper part, and yellow lower part. On merger with Trondheim Bilruter:Yellow upper part, dark red lower part.
