= Graakalbanen =

Tram operator in Trondheim, Norway

A/S Graakalbanen
- Company type: Private
- Industry: Transport
- Founded: 6 September 1916
- Defunct: 1 January 1972
- Headquarters: Trondheim, Norway
- Area served: Trondheim
- Key people: Robert Millar (founder); Nils Christoffer Bøckman (CEO 1916–66); Odd Hovdenak (CEO 1966–72)
- Products: Tram operation
- Subsidiaries: Graakalbanens Isforretning

A/S Graakalbanen was a private company that built and operated the Gråkallen Line of the Trondheim Tramway between 1924 and 1972. Established in 1916, it bought large land areas in Byåsen, and built a tramway through these to reach the recreational areas in Bymarka. The line first reached Munkvoll in 1924, Ugla in 1925, and finally Lian in 1933. The company owned through its history seven trams and five trailers, and only in the last few years did it operate six borrowed TS Class 7 trams.

The company had financial difficulties throughout its life. Only in the 1940s and 50s was traffic sufficient to create a profit. To supplement, the company was a large land owner, and sold housing lots along the line to increase ridership and generate income. It also operated sales of ice, and the recreational area at Lian. The company was bought by the city in 1966, and merged with Trondheim Sporvei and Bynesruten in 1972 to form Trondheim Trafikkselskap.

== History ==
=== Establishment ===
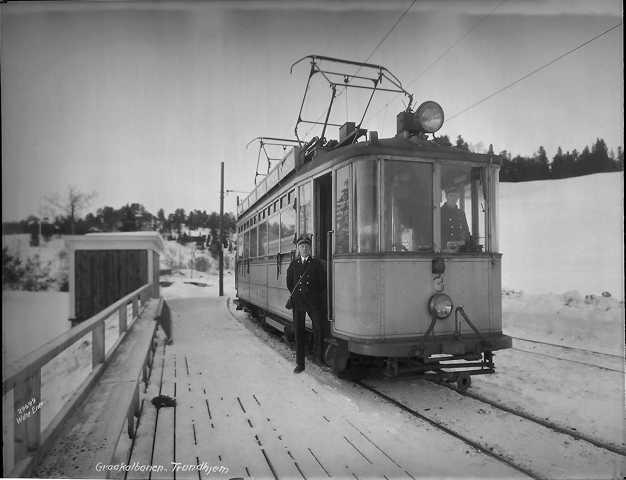
Class 1 tram in 1927

During the 1910s, Fjellseter, close to the peak Gråkallen, had been one of the main recreational areas for Trondheim. On 20 August 1915, Millar and two friends were waiting for the bus to take them to Fjellseter where they were planning to have dinner. When the bus never came, they decided during dinner in the city center to try to establish the tramway. The same day, he sent a number of letters to people and associations, inviting them to found a private company to build and operate the tramway. When he arrived back a week later from a trip to London, all the invited people had accepted. The first meeting was held on 3 November, and Millar was appointed chair of the committee.

In March, the municipality was contacted, and the city council gave a small sum for preliminary investigations. However, they decided that the municipal tramway, Trondheim Sporvei, did not have sufficient capital to build a tramway to Byåsen, and let a private company build the line. Based on experience from the Holmenkoll Line and Ekeberg Line in Oslo, the company chose to purchase massive amounts of undeveloped real estate along the line. They could later be sold as housing lots, which would give the company additional capital, and create a basis for sufficient ridership. This would make the company the largest land owner both in Trondheim and in Strinda Municipality.

On 6 September 1916, the company A/S Graakalbanen was founded. It had a capital of 510,500 kr; each of 1,021 was worth NOK 500. A new board was appointed, led by Mathias Eckhoff, and also having Ferdinand Bjerke and Nils Christoffer Bøckman on it. The contract to purchase the real estate was signed on 13 October 1916, and on 2 November a regulation plan competition was announced, funded with NOK 5,000. On 26 January 1917, a new general meeting expanded the capital by permitting between 1,400 and 2,400 new shares to be sold. By then the necessary concession had been granted by the municipality.

=== Construction ===
Two proposals for the route were made. The company chose the proposal made by Ferdinand Bjerke, and engineer working for the Norwegian State Railways. A suggestion from the city planner Trygve Thesen was rejected. It would run in a loop via Dyrborg, making the line longer. However, more of the track was offered to be built and paid by the city, increasing the leasing costs from NOK 7,000 to 12,000. Construction for the company would be cheaper (NOK 1,300,000 vs. NOK 1,630,000). In July 1917, a Nordic architecture competition for the estates was announced. Of nineteen suggestions, Hoff from Kristiania won. The resulting regulation plan was passed in the city councils in 1918.

At the same time the end terminal in the city center was not yet determined. By terminating at Ilevolden, the company could choose any rolling stock, including the higher 1,200 V current used on the Ekeberg Line of Oslo. Should the trams continue they would need to use Trondheim Sporvei's 600 V, meter gauge and car width. However, Trondheim Sporvei had chosen to convert its system to wide cars at 260 cm (100 in) width. If the city chose to start the rebuilding of track from the current 200 cm (79 in) width, it would allow Graakalbanen to buy wide stock.

The first conveying started in 1917, and the following January the city engineer started construction, but this soon terminated. At the same time Graakalbanen started preparing the first lots for sale, including installation of water, sewage and roads. In June 1919, the engineering company Grøndahl & Kjørholt took over the work, planning to be finished to Lian by 1921. However, by June 1920, the rising prices resulted in the money being used up. At the same time it turned out that the rolling stock was too much more expensive than expected; ordering of rolling stock was therefore delayed. In 1921, no construction was done on the line. Not before Trondhjems og Stridens Sparebank issued a loan of NOK 1.6 million was it possible to continue construction. This was based on mortgaging all assets, as well as a NOK 500,000 guarantee from the city council. While work previously had been along the whole route, it was then only concentrated on the section Ila–Munkvoll, where the depot would be located.

Four trams and two trailers were ordered from Hannoversche Waggonfabrik (HaWa), with motors from Siemens. The GB Class 1 trams cost NOK 360,000, including some work trailers. The chassis were delivered on 20 July 1924, while the motors came on 5 July. They were assembled at the Dalsenget Depot. The first test run was on 5 July, but failed due to a short circuit. A successful attempt was made on 9 July. The tracks were completed in March, but not until the trams were delivered could service start. The tramway was opened on 18 July 1924 at 18:00. Ordinary service started the next day. The first weekend there were thousands of people who wanted to see the new trams, and demand exceeded capacity. Soon ridership dropped considerably.

=== Expansion ===
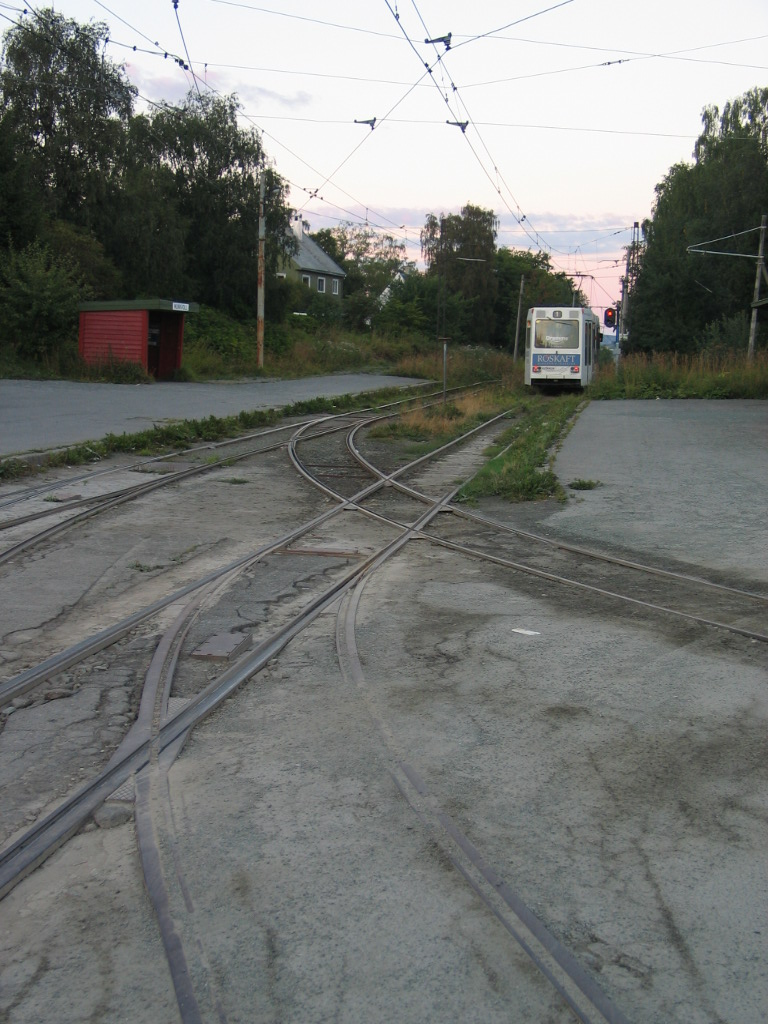
Modern view of Munkvoll tram stop

The initial service had departures once per hour. Trams left Munkvoll on the whole hour, and from St. Olavs gate on half hours. Weekend traffic was considerable, but ridership on weekdays was very limited. The management felt this was because Munkvoll was not close enough to the recreational areas of Bymarka, and proposed a quick expansion to Ugla. At the same time, the ticket price was set high compared to the city trams, at NOK 0.60 for adults. In 1924, there were 144,774 passengers.

The first expansion would come the following year. Construction of the line to Ugla had started, and was opened on 30 May 1925. To create additional traffic, two of the board members established their own company to build a tavern at Ugla. The rebuilding of the Ugla Farm included a small zoo with various aquatic birds and a hare. Part of the tavern was rebuilt to become a concert hall, and an electric organ was installed. Graakalbanen gave support to the tavern per sold ticket, and up to 5,000 people would travel to the tavern on sunny summer weekends.

In addition to the constant sale of housing, Graakalbanen chose to sell a large section around Ugla as cabin lots. There could be bought for NOK 1 per m^{2} (10 sq ft). Lots could be bought, paid on installments, or leased. However, the sale of lots went a lot slower than predicted, in part because of the low conjunctures. The Ekeberg Line in Oslo, that had been the inspiration for Graakalbanen, had after all been established some years earlier, and could take advantage of the war boom.

Another creative idea to create more revenue was the establishment of Graakalbanens Isforretning A/S. By building a branch line from Ugla to the lake Kyvannet, the company could freight ice down to its offices in Sandgata 2. There, it packed the ice into sawdust, and it would keep as long as August. It was sold in blocks and crushed to restaurants, ships, fish exporters and private households. This remained in service until the 1940s, after which the branch line was removed.

During 1925, Graakalbanen freighted only 321,133 people, half the calculated amount. Operation went with a NOK 20,00 loss, but on top came financial costs of NOK 190,000. 1926 had some more ridership, but the company still went with a loss. The city council was forced to pay NOK 30,000 as part of the guarantee. A municipal committee was given mandate to consider nationalizing the line, but this was not done. Discounts were then introduced to increase ridership, but this did not bring much more traffic. Traffic continued to fall until 1930.

Further expansions to Lian was also considered, but management was skeptical to having two destinations, since they would not create the necessary critical mass. Then the tavern and farm at Ugla burnt down in 1931, and the insurance company allowed the insurance money to be used to be built at Lian. To finance the line extension, Graakalbanen decided to create a new company; A/S Ugla–Lian was organized in such a way that it would have no expenses, only income. A/S Ugla–Lian would build the line, and Graakalbanen would pay NOK 0.05 per passenger freighted on the line. Graakalbanen would cover all operating, maintenance and administrative expensive, even for the other company. The initial sale raised NOK 73,375. Wholesaler Johan P. Dahl bought the largest share, for NOK 10,000, that he gave to the construction workers. The company was founded on 20 December 1932, and had its share capital expanded to 80,000 two years later.

Construction of the 2.1 km (1.3 mi) expansion was started in the fall of 1932.The company made a deal with the city to employ family providers; in exchange the city would pay the difference between normal pay and the increased pay. 32 men with four or more children were chosen for this deal. The first test run was on 29 September 1933, and was taken into use on 28 October 1933. A number of recreational services grew up at Lian, including a ski jump in the winter, and bathing and rowing in the lake Lianvannet in the winter. 1925, during winter, the frozen lake was used for trotting, with up to 6,000 watchers. In 1927, the land owner Graakalbanen offered the trotting association 100 hectare of land for free, but the deal did not go through, but the association did not except the deal since the tramway was not yet built. Instead they established themselves at Leangen. During World War II, the new field was confiscated by the German occupation forces, and again the association was offered free land. The deal only did not strike through thanks to a single, unwilling cabin owner.

During the first years of the 1930s the ridership dropped significantly, and the grew slightly; by 1937 they were back at the level in 1930, and in 1939 they were up to 447,642. At the same time the sale of lots increased, especially around Ferstad, and a new station was opened at Søndre Hoem. During the 1930s, the company annually lost NOK 64–80,000. The municipal power company threatened to cut the power, and Graakalbanen offered the municipality to take over the line. Since all the municipal lines were profitable, the municipality declined.

=== War and growth ===
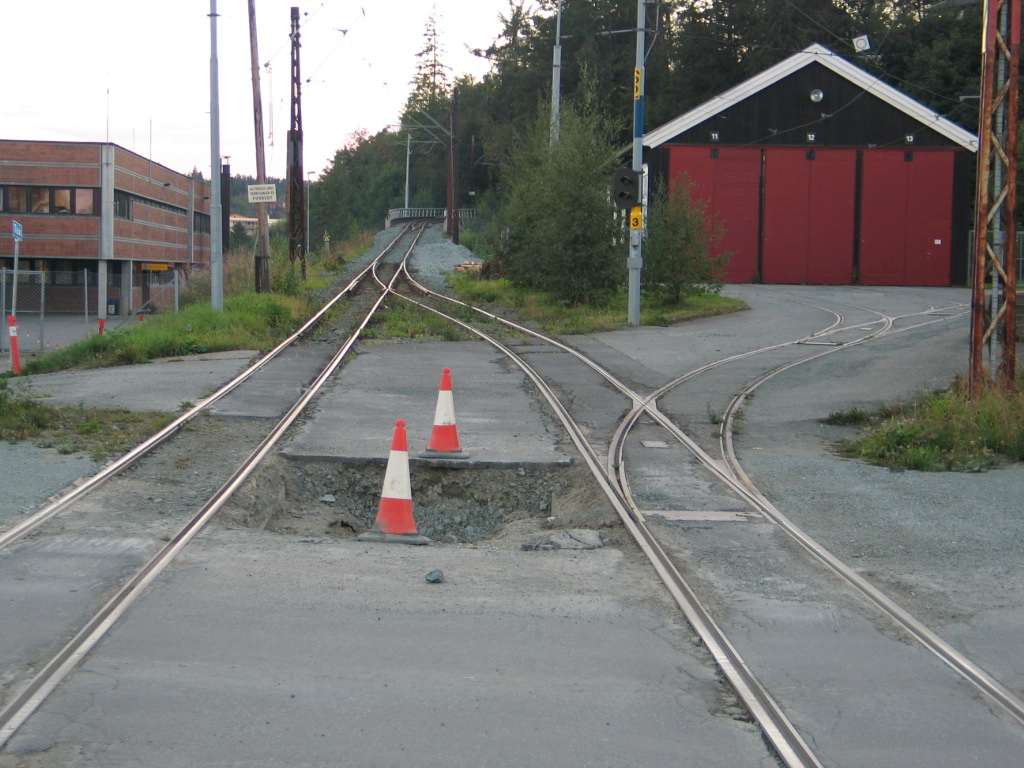
Original Munkvoll Depot to the right

World War II would show the highest ridership on the line through history. With the rationing on petrol, soon only the electric trams operated. 1940 showed an increase to 884,000 passengers, and for the first time the company made a profit of NOK 56,200. After long negotiations, in 1941, NOK 1 million of the debt was covered by the municipality. At the same time, A/S Ugla–Lian was bought and merged, at 25% above par. Ridership continued to increase, with 1.2 million in 191, and up to 2.16 million in 1945. Also during the war, the increased amount of money and lack of things to spend it on, caused most of the available lots owned by the company to be sold.

In February 1943, two of the board members were shot by the German occupation forces. A new board was commissioned by the Germans, but Bøckman would not except it. A major in the army, he had participated in the war in Northern Norway in 1940. He was then arrested, and spent the rest of the war in the prison camps Falstad and Grini. Administrator Hove was appointed new director, but after the war he was fired for disloyalty. Due to introduction of conductors, the number of employees increased from 20 to 60 during the war.

Two working trailers were rebuilt to a single passenger trailer. In addition, the company chose to order of a tram and trailer from Skabo Jernbanevognfabrikk in 1941. The GB Class 2 was put into service on 9 June 1943 and cost NOK 289,000. An additional two trailers were delivered in 1947, and in 1950 a motor arrived so the first trailer could be rebuilt to a tram.

The high revenue during the war had given the company a large amount of cash, but also a worn down fleet. Each year, the profits were between NOK 143,000 and 430,000. This included a write-off of NOK 600,000. The money was invested in a new turning loop at Lian and St. Olavs gate, and a double track between Breidablikk and Nordre Hoem. The tracks were upgraded, as was other parts of the infrastructure. NOK 400,000 was invested in building 4 km (2.5 mi) of road, 5 km (3.1 mi) of water pipes and 6 km (3.7 mi) of sewer pipes. A new and much larger depot building was also built to supplement the old one at Munkvoll. In 1950, 15-minute headway was introduced.

Unlike Trondheim Sporvei, who had sufficient profits to purchase new material, Graakalbanen was forced to sell assets. On 12 October 1955, the company sold the restaurant at Lian for NOK 130,000. This money was used to order a tram and trailer, the GB Class 3, from Hønefoss Karrosserifabrikk (Høka). It had been ordered in 1954, delivered in September 1955, and was put into service in December.

To allow a future 10-minute headway, a new signaling system was installed in 1958 up to Ugla. Up until then, tokens had been used to regulate traffic. This cost NOK 200,000, and to finance it, the company sold their property at St. Olavs gate 5–7 to the Norwegian Farmers' Union for NOK 437,500.

=== Nationalization ===
In 1960, the sale of cars was deregulated, and anyone could purchase a car. At the same time, Trondheim started a merger process with the neighboring municipalities, and plans were made to build large suburbs far from the city center, that would be depopulated, and connect the suburbs with motorways. A new four-line highway along Byåsenveien was opened in 1966. Traffic numbers fell rapidly, and the company needed to replace its aging fleet. Traffic patterns were also changing, since Lian to a greater extent was becoming a winter rather than summer destination.

By the mid 1960s, the municipality had a 43% ownership i Graakalbanen. In Oslo, the municipal Oslo Sporveier had taken over the private Bærumsbanen, Ekebergbanen and Holmenkolbanen. Negotiations were initiated, and on 6 October 1965 agreement was reached where the municipality paid NOK 250 per share, thus evaluating the company at NOK 1.25 million. This was approved in a general meeting on 17 November. The municipality valuated the real estates at NOK 2.3 million, while debt was at NOK 1.4 million. Director Bøchman, at the time 86 years old, retired, and was replaced by Odd Hovdenak, director of Trondheim Sporvei.

After the nationalization, the company had more money to spend. A new turning loop was built at Munkvoll, and a 10-minute headway was introduced from St. Olavs gate to Munkvoll, and a 20-minute headway to Lian. Price were reduced, and 1967 showed a 10% ridership increase. The signaling was improved with fixed blocks, and only Munkvoll–Lian still used the token. The rolling stock was painted the same yellow and blue, but the coat of arms used by Trondheim Sporvei were not used on Graakalbanen.

Instead of purchasing new rolling stock for the Gråkallen Line, the city trams were to start operating on the line. Trondheim Sporvei needed buses for the closing of the Singsaker Line, and made a deal with Graakalbanen, where the latter would purchase four new Büssing buses and rent them out to Trondheim Sporvei for the amortization cost, in exchange for renting excess trams. Each bus cost NOK 237,000. However, there was a lack of material in Trondheim Sporvei, and not until 7 November 1966 could a TS Class 7 city tram be taken into use. This was supplemented with a trailer on 6 February 1967. Also, there was operated a direct route from Lian to Lade during the morning rush hour. Seven additional buses were ordered in 1968, financed through a NOK 1.750,000 loan. In exchange the company got five additional trams. However, Trondheim Sporvei had problems delivering the trams. With this deal in place, the oldest trams could be retired. However, from 30 June to 19 August 1968, Trondheim Sporvei needed the trams again, and the old Class 1 was back in service. The final run of the Class 1 in regular service was on 29 November 1968. From 19 May 1969 the trams lost their conductors.

=== Merger ===
In addition to two tramway companies, the city had bought the bus company Bynesruten. In 1969, the city council decided to merge the three companies into Trondheim Trafikkselskap (TT), and to organize it as a limited company to limit bureaucratization, and realize effectiveness through simpler decision making. The company was formally founded on 28 July 1971, and took over the three other companies on 1 January 1972. Odd Hovdenak, was appointed CEO. Two years later, Trondheim Bilruter, and the Trondheim divisions of NSB Bilruter and Klæburuten was also merged into TT.

== Rolling stock ==
Class	No. trams	No. trailers	Builder	Built	Withdrawn
Class 1	1–4	51–52	HaWa	1924	1969
Class 2	5–6	53–54	Skabo	1942	1973
Class 3	7	55	Hønefoss Karrosserifabrikk	1955	1970
