= GB Class 2 =

Class of Norwegian trams

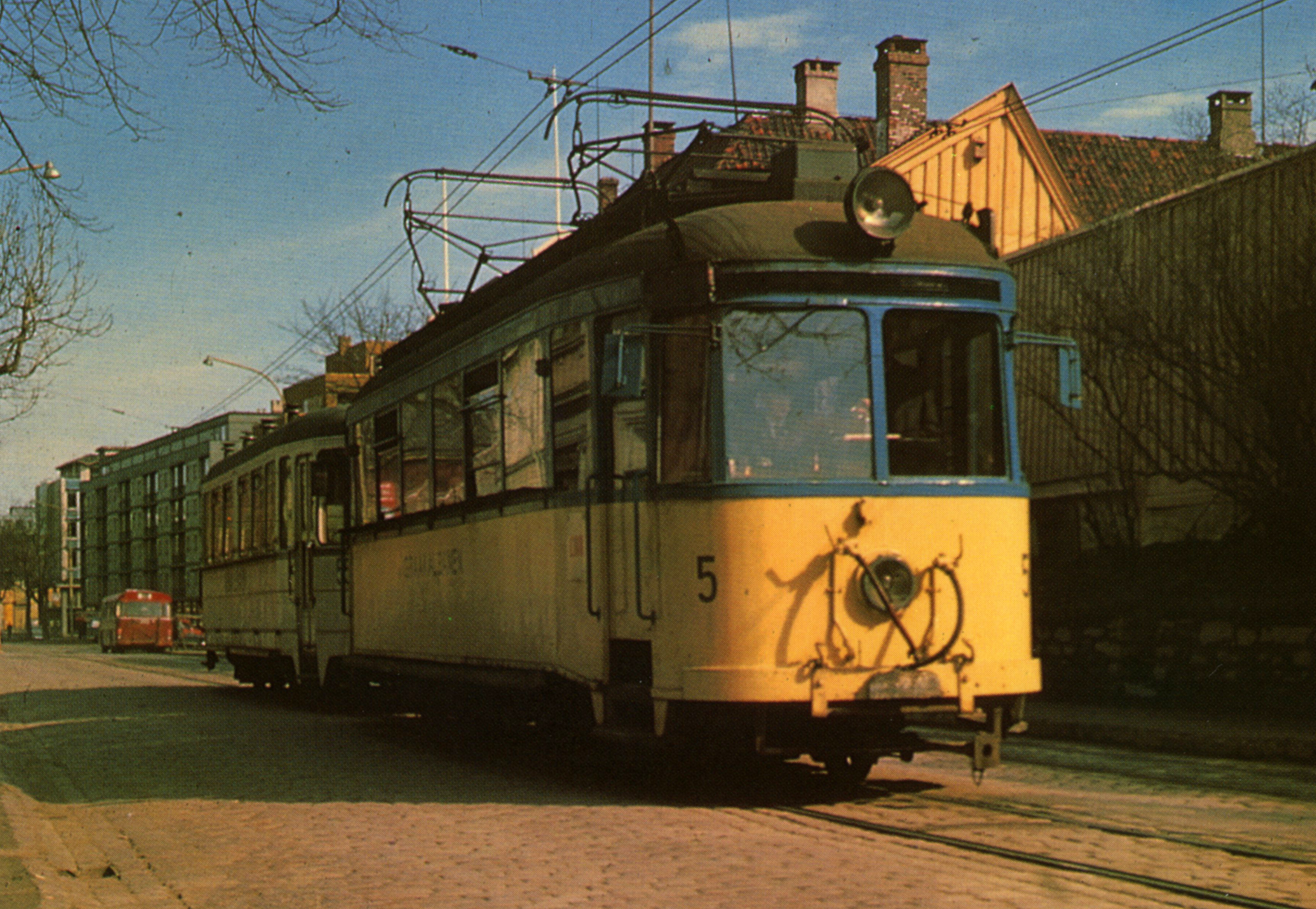
- Class 2 in 1966
- Manufacturer: Skabo
- Constructed: 1943–1947
- Entered service: 1943
- Number built: 2 trams 2 trailers
- Number preserved: 1
- Fleet numbers: 5–6 (trams); 53–54 (trailers)
- Operators: Graakalbanen
- Depots: Munkvoll
- Lines served: Gråkallen Line

Specifications
- Car body construction: Wood
- Car length: 13.0 m (42 ft 8 in)
- Width: 2.6 m (8 ft 6 in)
- Doors: 4
- Weight: 24.0 t (23.6 long tons; 26.5 short tons)
- Traction system: Siemens D 503a /GBM 431
- Power output: 240 kW (320 hp)
- Electric system(s): 600 V DC
- Current collection: Pantograph
- Track gauge: 1,000 mm (3 ft 3 3/8 in)

GB Class 2 was a series of two trams and two trailers built by Skabo Jernbanevognfabrikk for Graakalbanen of Trondheim, Norway.

Each of the four Siemens motors had an effect of 60 kW (80 hp). There were two compartments, both with four-abreast seating, with reversible seats. Despite running in part in city streets, the trams were 2.6 m (8 ft 6 in) wide. They had seating for 40 passengers.

The trams were ordered in 1941, and a single set of tram and trailer was delivered in May 1940. Not until 1947 were to additional trailers delivered. In 1950, the second motor was delivered from Siemens, and the first trailer could be rebuilt to a tram. The trams remained in service until 1973 when they were replaced by the TS Class 7 trams, following the merger of Graakalbanen into Trondheim Trafikkselskap, and the subsequent reorganizing of routes, so the Gråkallen Line was operated onwards along the Lademoen Line. No. 5 is preserved as a heritage tram at Trondheim Tramway Museum, while no. 6 was scrapped in 1983.
