= GB Class 3 =

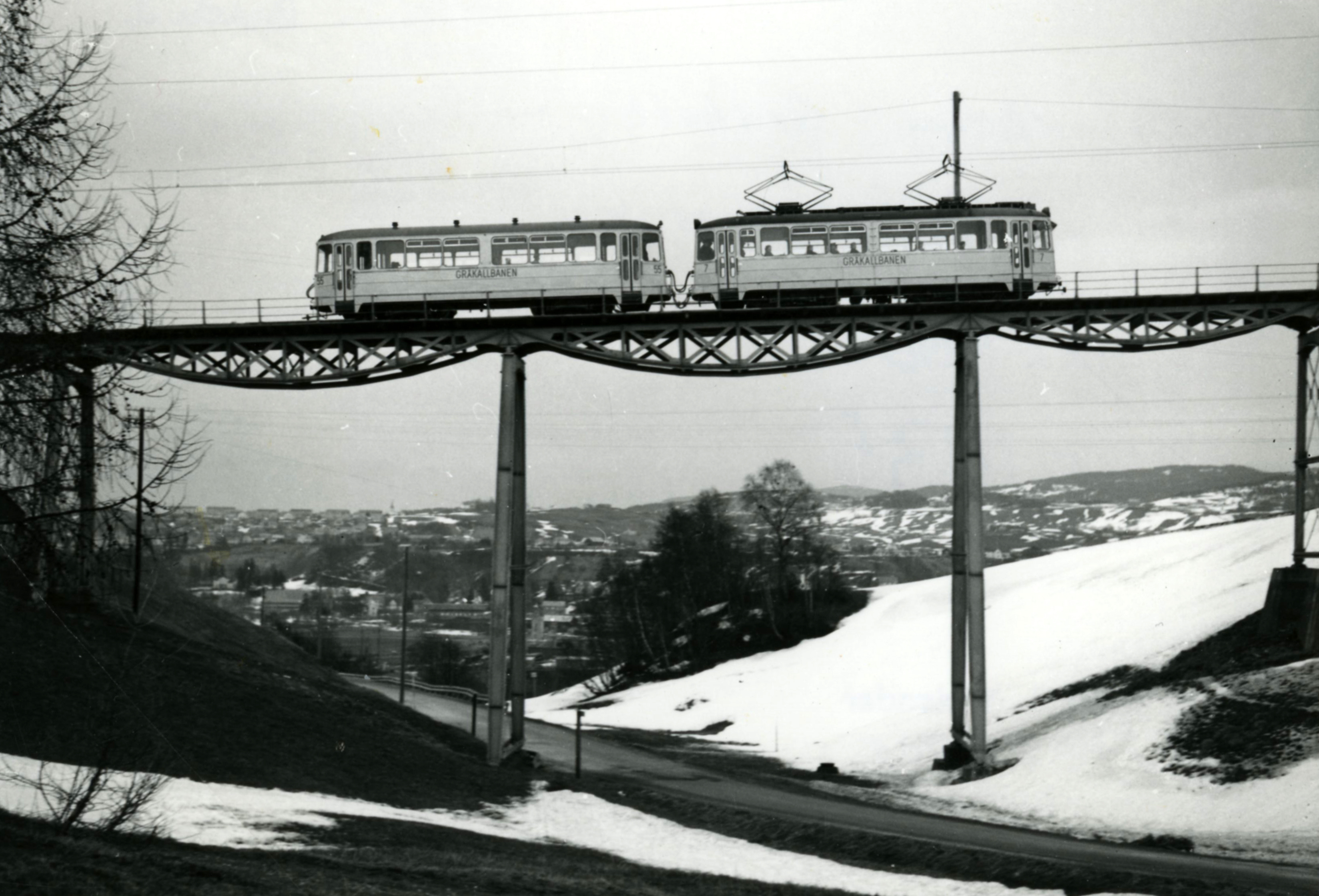
- In service: 1955–1973
- Manufacturer: Høka
- Constructed: 1955
- Number built: 1 tram 1 trailer
- Number preserved: 1
- Fleet numbers: 7 (tram); 55 (trailer)
- Capacity: 40 seats, later 36 seats
- Operators: Graakalbanen
- Depots: Munkvoll
- Lines served: Gråkallen Line

Specifications
- Car body construction: Wood
- Car length: 13.0 m (42 ft 8 in)
- Width: 2.6 m (8 ft 6 in)
- Doors: 4
- Weight: 16.8 t (16.5 long tons; 18.5 short tons)
- Traction system: Siemens GBM 431, 4 off
- Power output: 240 kW (320 hp)
- Electric system(s): 600 V DC
- Current collector(s): Pantograph
- Track gauge: 1,000 mm (3 ft 3 3/8 in)

GB Class 3 was a single tram and trailer built by Hønefoss Karosserifabrikk for Graakalbanen of Trondheim, Norway.

Each of the four Siemens motors had an effect of 60 kW (80 hp). The trams were criticized for not having sufficient space for baby buggies. Despite running in part in city streets and on meter gauge, the trams were 2.6 m (8 ft 6 in) wide. They had seating for 40, later 36, passengers.

The tram were delivered in 1955. It remained in service until 1973, when it was replaced by the TS Class 7 trams, following the merger of Graakalbanen into Trondheim Trafikkselskap, and the subsequent reorganizing of routes, so the Gråkallen Line was operated onwards along the Lademoen Line. It is preserved as a heritage tram at Trondheim Tramway Museum.
