= Robert Millar (marketer) =

Robert Millar (13 January 1878 – 2 June 1960) was an Irish born, Norwegian advertising executive and author. Each year the Trondheim Marketing Association awards the Robert Millar Prize (Robert Millar-prisen) in his honour.

== Background ==
Millar was born at Ballymena, County Antrim in Northern Ireland. He grew up in a strongly religious environment, within a Presbyterian community. Educated at Royal Belfast Academical Institution and later at Queen's University Belfast, Millar trained to become a Presbyterian priest and studied in New College, Edinburgh. In 1903, Millar moved to Trondheim, Norway. He first began to work as an English language teacher at Trondheim Cathedral School. In 1906, he became secretary for the Norwegian Trekking Association in Trondheim.

== Career ==
Millar has been credited for introducing modern marketing in Norway. From 1909 he was Norway's first marketer, working for the steamship company, Det Nordenfjeldske Dampskibsselskab. In 1914 he started the publication Romilla Revenue, to publish critical articles about advertisement in Norway. Two years later he founded the Trondheim Marketing Association. In 1914, Millar wrote Reklamelærer, the first Norwegian language textbook on advertising. In October 1914, Millar launched the advertising magazine, Romilla Revenue.

For many years there had been talk about building a tramway from the city center to the Bymarka recreational area. On 20 August 1915, Millar and two friends were waiting for the bus to take them to Fjellseter. When the bus never came, they decided during dinner in the city centre to try to establish the tramway. The same day he sent a number of letters to people and associations, inviting them to found a private company to build and operate the tramway. The first meeting was held on 3 November with Millar appointed chair and engineer Ferdinand Bjerke added to the committee. Millar stayed in the position until 6 September 1916, when A/S Graakalbanen was founded to build and operate the Gråkallen Line of the Trondheim Tramway.

In 1917, Millar moved to Kristiania (now Oslo) to work with advertising for the newly established Handelsbanken. He also started his own advertising agency that year, Robert Millar & Co. In 1918 he was a co-founder of the advertising school at Oslo Stock Exchange, the first of its kind in the Nordic countries. From the late 1920s, Millar was affiliated with the advertising agency Gumælius and Reklames Annoncebureau, and from the late 1930s he was affiliated with Forenede Annonsebyråer. Millar worked actively in advertising until he died in 1960. .

== Personal life ==
Millar was married in 1905 with Signe Flor (1882-1958) and in 1916 with Hermine Larson (1881-1928). Both marriages were dissolved. In 1925, he married Ella Berus (1895-1971). Their daughter Margaret (1917-2001) was married to associate professor Alf Kinge (1902-1989). Both Robert Millar and his wife, Ella, were buried in the churchyard of Bekkelaget Church in the district of Nordstrand of Oslo.

== Selected works ==
- Engelsk ABC for emigranter, Trondheim 1905
- Trondhjems domkirke, Trondheim 1906
- Guide to Trondhjem and Environs, Trondheim 1908
- First English Reader. Engelsk læsebog for skolebruk, Trondheim 1908

== Related reading ==
- Amund Smidt Lysaker (2014) The Professionalization of the Norwegian Advertising Trade, 1914-1918 (University of Oslo. Master's Thesis in History)
