= TT Class 8 =

Class of Norwegian trams

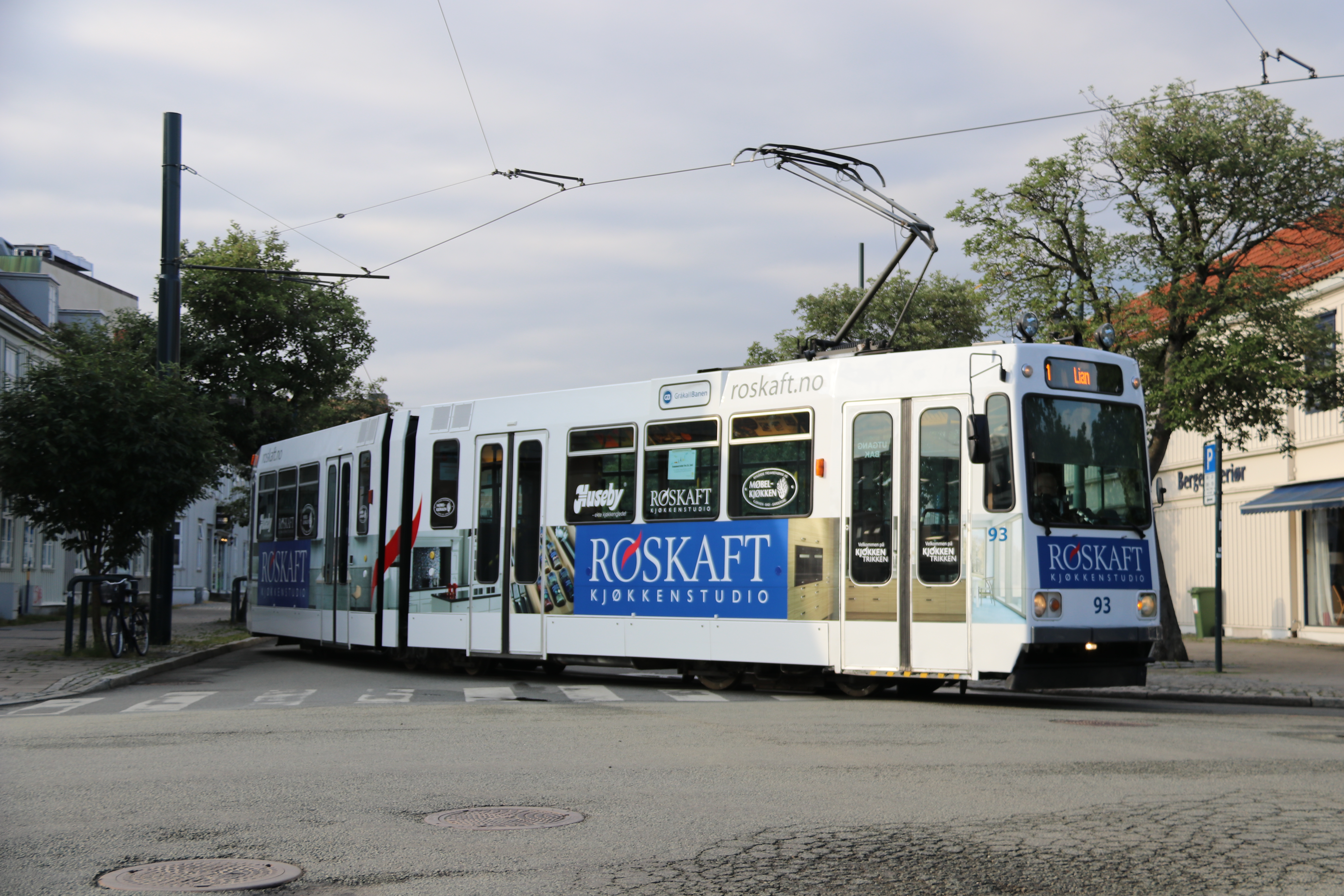
- Class 8 tram leaving St. Olavs Gate

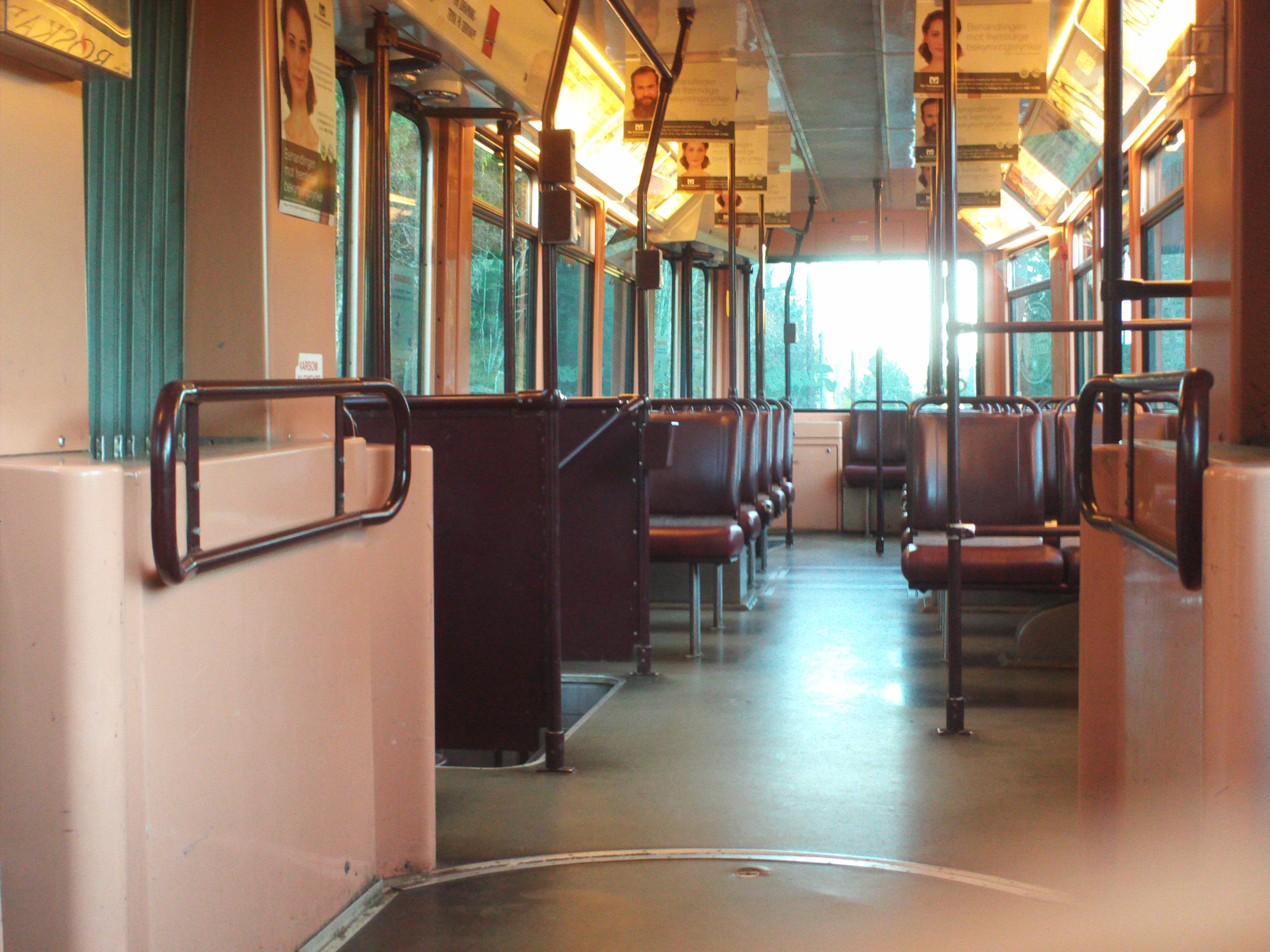
- Manufacturer: Linke-Hofmann-Busch
- Family name: Braunschweig
- Replaced: TS Class 7
- Constructed: 1984
- Entered service: 1984
- Scrapped: 2000–
- Number built: 11
- Number in service: 9
- Number scrapped: 2
- Operators: Trondheim Trafikkselskap (1984–88); Gråkallbanen (1990–2008); Veolia Transport Bane (2008–11); Boreal Transport Bane (2011–12); Boreal Transport Midt-Norge (2012–16); Boreal Bane (2016–)
- Depots: Munkvoll (1984–88); Voldsminde (1988–90); Munkvoll (1990–)
- Line served: Gråkallen Line

Specifications
- Car length: 19.9 m (65 ft 3 in)
- Width: 2.6 m (8 ft 6 in)
- Floor height: 0.91 m (36 in)
- Doors: 4
- Maximum speed: 60 km/h (37 mph)
- Weight: 27.1 t (26.7 long tons; 29.9 short tons)
- Prime mover: Siemens IKB2021-OMK02
- Power output: 300 kW (400 hp)
- Acceleration: 1.2 m/s^{2} (3.9 ft/s^{2})
- Deceleration: 1.3 m/s^{2} (4.3 ft/s^{2})
- Electric system: 600 V DC
- Current collection: Pantograph
- Bogies: B'2'B'
- Multiple working: Car 93 + 96
- Track gauge: 1,000 mm (3 ft 3 3/8 in)

TT Class 8 are the only remaining trams used on the Trondheim Tramway. Built by Linke-Hofmann-Busch (LHB) in 1984, they replaced the aging Class 7 trams used by Trondheim Trafikkselskap (TT). Of the eleven built, nine remain in service on the Gråkallen Line operated by Boreal Bane.

== Specifications ==
Class 8 is built for the unique combination of meter gauge and 2.6 m (8 ft 6 in) wagon width of the tramways in Trondheim. 19.9 m (65 ft 3 in) long, they have a capacity of 53 seated and 85 standing passengers in a 2+2 configuration. With a single driver's cab, all but 4 seats are forward facing. Two 150 kW (200 hp) motors from Siemens power each of the end bogies, while the center bogie is unpowered.

== Operation ==
Four trams are needed to serve the Gråkallen Line on a 15-minute headway. With two in reserve, six trams are in regular service. On 8 April 1997, trams no. 91 and 98 collided front-to-front. Both were put aside, and were scrapped in 2000. Eleven of the trams have been taken into use by Gråkallbanen, numbered 90 to 100. Numbers 93, 94, 95, 96, 97 and 99 remain in service; 91, 92, 98 and 100 have been scrapped. Number 90 remains stored at the depot for future restoration to serviceable condition.

== History ==
=== Bids ===
In 1979, TT started working on the process of ordering new trams. The whole fleet of Class 7 trams was from 1958, and these would soon need replacement. Invitations to tenders were sent in July 1980. A study trip was taken by seven people to the factories of ČKD Tatra in Czechoslovakia and Duewag in Germany. They also looked at the tramways in Brno and Essen. By 1 December, eight bids had come in:

Manufacturer	Type	Axles	Width
Duewag	Stadtbahn M6	6	2.5 m (8 ft 2 in)
La Brugeoise et Nivelles	Charleroi	6	2.5 m (8 ft 2 in)
Linke-Hofmann-Busch	Braunschweig	4 or 6	2.6 m (8 ft 6 in)
Schweizerische Industrie Gesellschaft	Tram 2000	6	2.5 m (8 ft 2 in)
Strømmens Værksted	SL79 (Oslo)	4 or 6	2.5 m (8 ft 2 in)
Valmet	Nr II (Helsinki)	6	2.6 m (8 ft 6 in)
Waggon Union	Darmstadt	6	2.5 m (8 ft 2 in)
Pragoinvest/Tatra	T5C5	4	2.5 m (8 ft 2 in)

Only LHB and Valmet could deliver the special 2.6 m (8 ft 6 in) wide trams used in Trondheim. The bid from Tatra was the cheapest (at NOK 2.2 million per tram), but 33 units would be needed, since they would have to run as double units. An alternative with using ten of the newest trailers. The committee instead chose to the articulated, six-axle, tram from LHB as the Class 8. For both lines, trams would be needed, costing NOK 80 million. Various suggestions were made to avoid a full load financing. This included using NOK 20 million from the parking fund, but despite the matter being considered by the government, the money was never used.

=== Initial service ===
The first articulated tram came to Trondheim on 29 July 1984. It was stored at Voldsminde, while part of the track through the city center was removed for maintenance. The first test run was on 22 August, and the last tram was delivered on 4 January 1985. The track on the Gråkallen Line was replaced, and a new packing machine was bought. The platforms on the Gråkallen Line had to be rebuilt to a lower platform height. The trams started on a 10-minute headway along the remaining part of the tramway, from Lade to Lian.

Car 3 in Olav Tryggvasons gate in June 1988, on the Lade Line

The Class 8 had severe problems with water leaking into the gear oil. When discovered in January 1985, all the trams were grounded. The old trams were put into service, and LHB sent technicians to locate the error. After this was fixed, test runs were done and the trams put back into service. This proved to not be sufficient, and further tests were performed by the Norwegian Institute of Technology. Eventually the problems were fixed.

=== Sale attempt ===
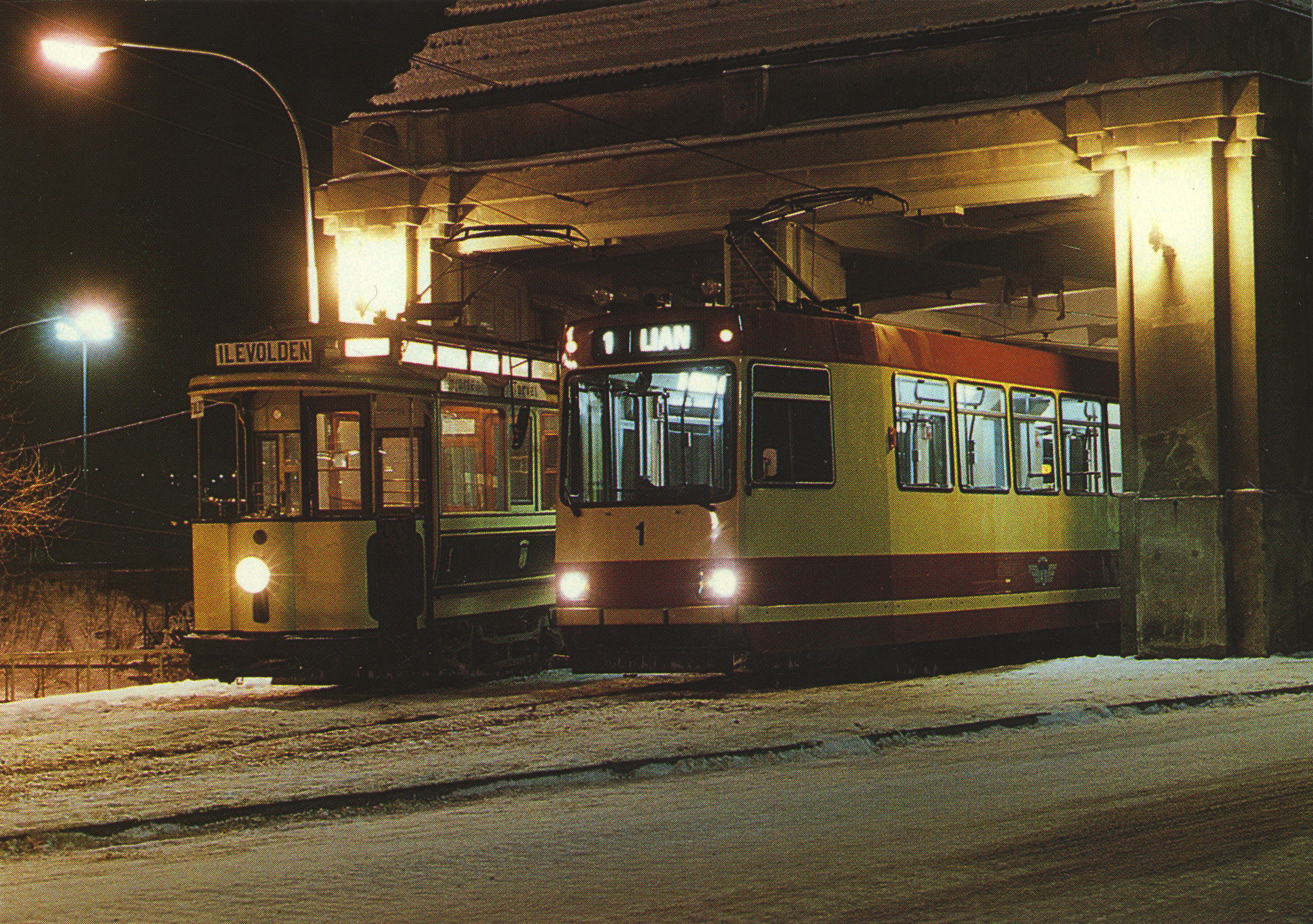
Class 8 tram in the original TT livery next to a veteran tram

After new trams, track and depot were in place, the tramway debate started again. In 1985, the city council voted for a full economic analysis of the costs of trams versus diesel buses. The question was if it would be possible to sell the trams to other cities. Trondheim had chosen an unusual combination of meter gauge and 260 cm (8 ft 6 in) wide wagons. Oslo Sporveier was considered as a possible purchaser, but then the trams would have to be rebuilt, costing NOK 1.9 million per unit. Also, Oslo Sporveier had slightly larger trams, and felt the Class 8 was too small for their needs. Conservative chair of Oslo Sporveier, Haakon Magnus Preus said live at a public meeting for the labor union in January that they did not want the trams. TT still felt that it would be possible to sell the trams for NOK 45 million.

After the decision to close the Trondheim Tramway in 1988, the last tram ran on 12 June, carrying about 20,000 passengers throughout the day. All the trams were then parked in Voldsminde Depot, while the heritage trams were moved to Munkvoll. The Gråkallen Line, including the Ila Line and the St. Olavs gate loop, would be spared, and would become a heritage railway, with a railway museum at Munkvoll. The Class 8 trams would be stored at Voldsminde until a suitable purchaser could be found. At Voldsminde, located just beside the Nordland Line, they could be freighted away by train. To ensure that the tramway could not be opened again, the tracks through the city center were removed on 14 June.

On 22 June 1989, the city council voted to re-open the line from St. Olavs Gate to Lian. A private company, Gråkallbanen, had been founded to operate the trams without subsidies. Agreements were made to take over seven of the trams from Trondheim Trafikkselskap. The trams would remain owned by the municipality, but rented free of charge to the new company.

After all the agreements were in place, TT announced on 30 December 1989 that it had found a new buyer for the trams. An agreement had been made with the Copenhagen-based Unimex Engineering, who would sell the eleven trams to the Cairo Tramway. On 2 January 1990, TT sent a letter to Gråkallbanen giving them the option to purchase the trams for the same price as the Egyptians, at an estimated NOK 17–20 million. However, Gråkallbanen pointed out to the politicians that it was possible to purchase used articulated trams for DEM 20,000 from the Stuttgart Stadtbahn. The company took the press with it to Stuttgart to negotiate the agreement, and the following Adresseavisen presented the cities new trams to the people. However, by the time the delegation had returned, they were informed that the deal had been annulled. Adresseavisen tried to locate Unimex in Copenhagen, but it turned out to be a company that had never sold a tram. At a press conference in Trondheim, the director of TT blamed Arbeider-Avisa's journalists for the deal not going through. When asked about the matter, representatives from the tramway company in Cairo said that the deal did not go through because the trams did not fit.
