= GB Class 1 =

Class of Norwegian trams

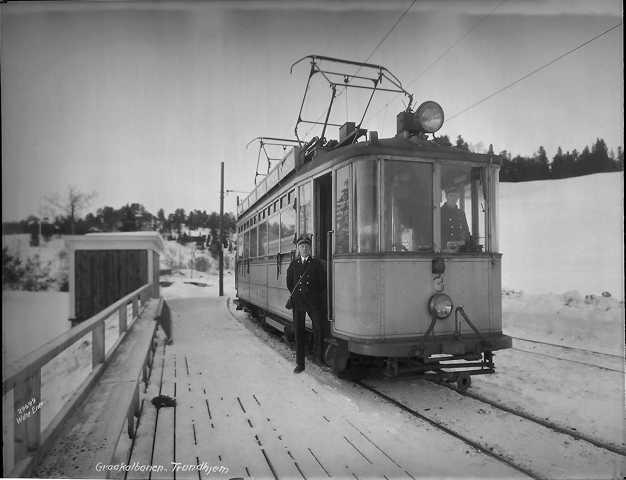
- Class 1 in 1927

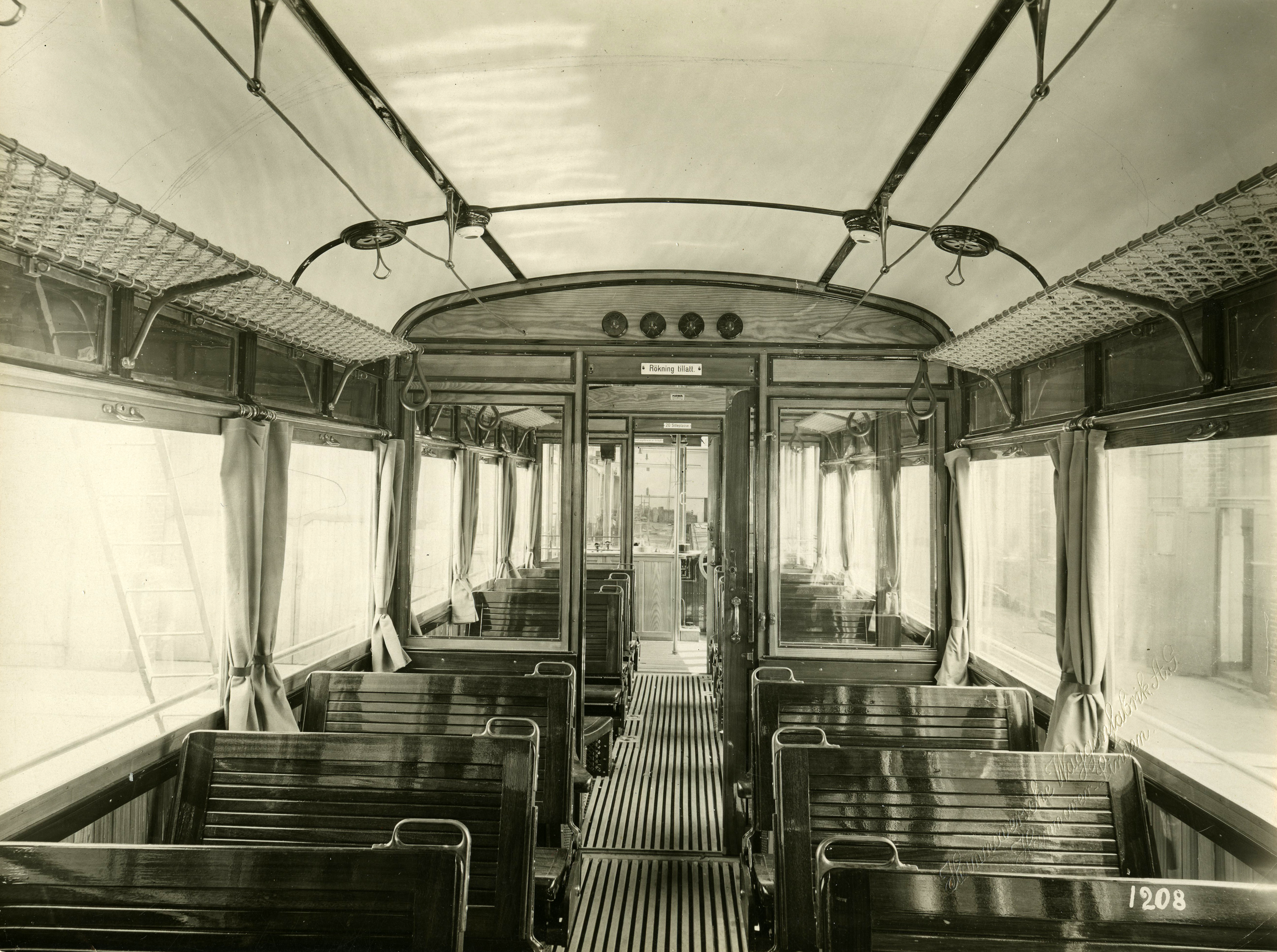
- Manufacturer: Hannoversche Waggonfabrik
- Constructed: 1924
- Entered service: 1924
- Scrapped: 1969, 1985
- Number built: 4 trams 2 trailers
- Number preserved: 1 tram
- Number scrapped: 3 trams, both trailers
- Fleet numbers: 1–4 (trams); 51–52 (trailers)
- Operators: Graakalbanen
- Depots: Munkvoll
- Lines served: Gråkallen Line

Specifications
- Car body construction: Wood
- Car length: 13.0 m (42 ft 7 3/4 in)
- Width: 2.6 m (8 ft 6 3/8 in)
- Doors: 4
- Weight: 29.0 t (28.5 long tons; 32.0 short tons)
- Traction system: Siemens DY 711 a
- Power output: 200 kW (270 hp)
- Electric system(s): 600 V DC
- Current collection: Pantograph
- Track gauge: 1,000 mm (3 ft 3 3/8 in) metre gauge

GB Class 1 was a series of four trams and two trailers built by Hannoversche Waggonfabrik for Graakalbanen of Trondheim, Norway.

Each of the four Siemens motors had an effect of 50 kW (67 hp). There were two compartments, both with four-abreast seating, with reversible seats. Despite running in part in city streets, the trams were 2.6 m (8 ft 6 in) wide.

The trams were taken out of service in 1968 and 1969. Two of the trams and both the trailers were scrapped the same year. No. 4 was kept as a working car until it was scrapped in 1985. No. 3 is preserved as a heritage tram at Trondheim Tramway Museum.
