= Høka =

Norwegian vehicle manufacturing company

Hønefoss Jernbanevogn- og Karosserifabrikk A/S
- Company type: Private
- Industry: Bodywork
- Founded: 1936
- Founder: Roald Breien
- Defunct: 1968
- Fate: Takeover
- Successor: Strømmens Værksted
- Headquarters: Hønefoss, Norway
- Area served: Norway
- Key people: Roald Breien (CEO 1936–48); Jakob Mørk (CEO 1948–68)
- Products: Buses, trucks, trams, railway cars
- Number of employees: 140 (1957)

Hønefoss Jernbanevogn- og Karosserifabrikk A/S, trading as Høka and at first known as Hønefoss Karosserifabrikk A/S, was a manufacturer of bodywork for buses, trucks and trains. The company was in existence from 1936 to 1968 and was based in Hønefoss, Norway. Among the company's products is Oslo Tramway's SM53 trams, the Trondheim Tramway's GB Class 3 tram and the Norwegian State Railways Skd 221 shunters.

== History ==
The company was founded as Hønefoss Karosserifabrikk in 1936 by Major Roald Breien, who wanted to start a mechanical workshop to create jobs in the local area. At first the company had six employees and was based in Arnemannsveien in the city center (now the seat of the city's culture center). To begin with, the company manufactured bus bodywork for domestic coach and bus companies. In addition, the company built tank trucks, fire engines and delivery vans. Høka had the Norwegian rights to a Czech patent for closed, wood-filled steel profiles. In Sweden, this patent was held by Hägglund & Söner, thus starting the cooperation between the two companies. By 1940, Høka had 50 employees. During World War II from 1940 to 1945, the demand for new buses halted, but Høka entered the maintenance and repair industry.

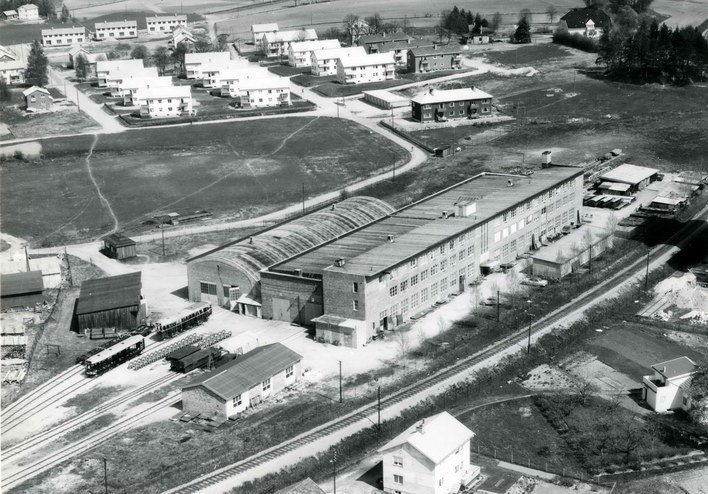
Aerial view of the factory

After the war, during which the company had made good money, the company built a new plant at Hønengaten outside the town in 1948. This plant was located to the Roa–Hønefoss Line of the Norwegian State Railways (NSB), and a branch line was constructed from the mainline railway to the plant. The new location, the cooperation with Hägglunds and NSBs need for large amounts of rolling stock during the 1950s, made it possible for Høka to enter the rolling stock market. At the same time, the company changed its name to Hønefoss Jernbanevogn- og Karosserifabrikk (meaning Hønefoss Railway Car and Bodyworks Factory). The same year also saw Breien retire, and be replaced by Jakob Mørk, who formerly had worked for Ekebergbanen, that operated one of the suburban tramways in Oslo. That year the company had 90 employees.

The company continued to manufacture buses after the war, and built bodywork in both wood, steel and aluminum. Production of buses peaked with 24 delivered vehicles in 1949, but from 1954 the company did not build any buses, except for a series of 33 vehicles to Oslo Sporveier in 1961. These were the last buses built by Høka. During the 1950s, both NSB, private railways and the tram operators in the country were in need of rolling stock. The main manufacturers were Strømmens Værksted and Skabo Jernbanevognfabrikk, with Eidsfoss Værk also building freight cars. The large quantity of the time, in addition to the strategic need for multiple manufacturers saw the rail companies spreading deliveries between the four manufacturers, and insisting on licence production of each other's models for large deliveries.

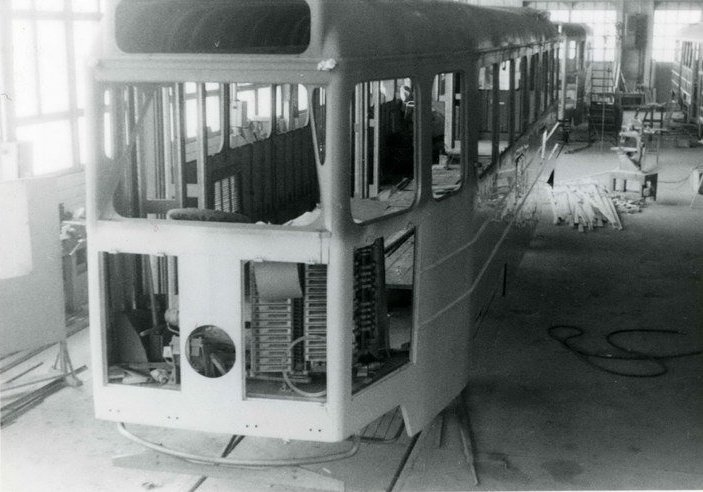
Construction of an SM53 tram in 1952

From 1952, the company also delivered trams. The first was a series of 30, later supplemented by 20 more trams and 12 trailers, were delivered until 1958. In 1956, the company lost a contract to build a new series of trams for the Trondheim Tramway after the Dalsenget fire that wiped out most of the tram fleet of Trondheim Sporvei, but the company managed to secure a single order from Graakalbanen for a tram and trailer on the Gråkallen Line in Trondheim. By 1957, the peak employment was reached, at 140 people. In 1957, the company delivered 20 gondolas to Narvik and in 1959, 400 trailers were delivered to the Norwegian Army.

In 1956, the company also started manufacturing a two-axle battery-powered locomotive. These had 600 mm (1 ft 11 5/8 in) gauge and electric equipment from Siemens. Thirteen units were sold to various industrial facilities between 1956 and 1962. From 1960, Høka also started manufacturing a standard gauge shunting locomotive. The first was sold to Norsk Jernverk, and the following year six were leased to NSB, who gave them designation Skd 221. In 1964, NSB bought an additional four units. The final unit was built for internal use at Høka. The goal of the Skd 221-delivery was to get the large contract that NSB would issue in the mid-1960s for their shunters, but this was instead given to Levahn Mekaniske Verksted of Oslo.

During the mid 1960s, there was a large decline in the demand for trains from NSB. At the same time, it was decided that both the tramways in Oslo and Bergen would be closed, and no new rolling stock would be needed. The authorities and NSB both realised that there was no need for more than one domestic manufacturer of rolling stock, and all new orders were placed with Strømmen. Due to lack of capacity at Strømmen, Høka received several suborders. In March 1967, Strømmen bought Høka, and decided to close the plant in December 1968.

== Vehicles ==
=== Buses ===
In 1938, the company delivered two trolleybuses to the Drammen trolleybus, operated by Drammen Kommunale Trikk. These electrical equipment for these were delivered by Ransomes, Sims & Jefferies of the United Kingdom. One of these buses has been preserved. Another type of bus was a semitrailer system that could carry 60 passengers, and was delivered to Engeseth Busslinjer in 1938, who used it until 1953 on their route from Hønefoss to Oslo.

=== Freight cars ===
The first rail contract was for eight boxcars that would be hauled by NSB Class 87 multiple units, with delivery in 1950. This was followed by various orders to the state railways, and included boxcars, reefers and steel bridges. Other customers included Norsk Jernverk and Norsk Transport (who operated the Rjukan Line). The largest freight order was for 180 boxcars type Gr5, delivered from 1963 to 1965. At the most, Høke delivered one freight car each 18 hours. In 1957, Høke delivered a 891 mm (2 ft 11 3/32 in) gauge timber car for the Swedish Nordmark–Klarälven Railway. In 1968, Høka delivered two skip cars to Sydvaranger.

=== Oslo Tramway SM53 ===
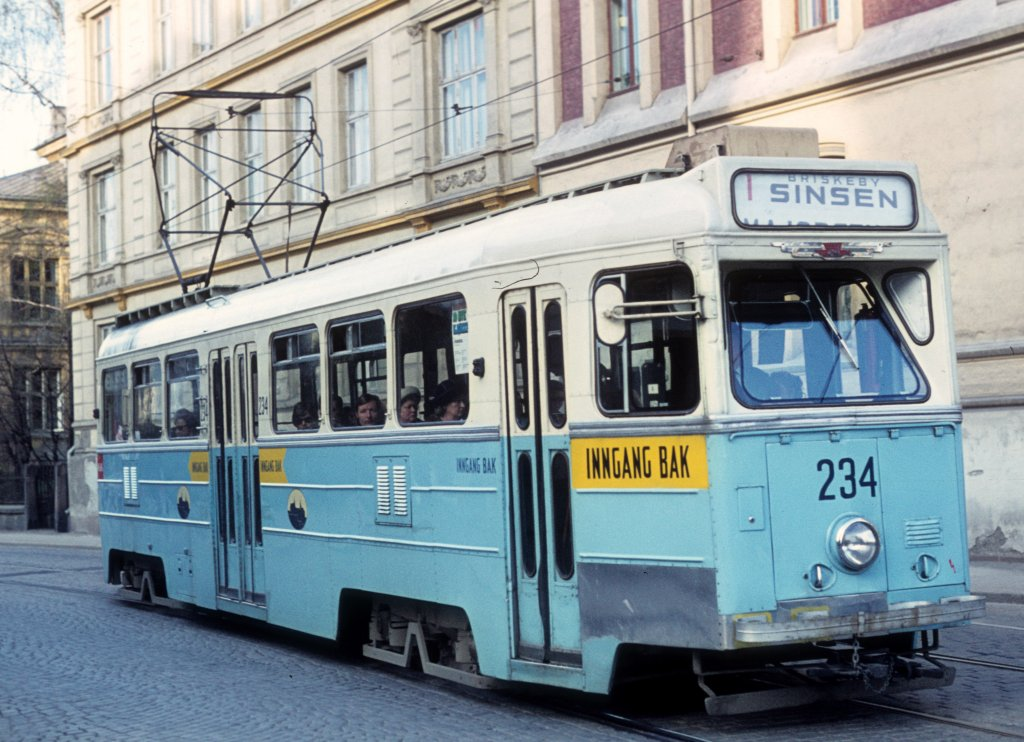
SM53 tram of the Oslo Tramway

The SM53 were a tram model which operated for more than 40 years on the Oslo Tramway. A number of these trams were later rebuilt and became known as SM83 trams. The trams were based on the Swedish Mustang trams, and were delivered with Swedish electronics. Høka gained a reputation and legacy as very reliable and successful. Between 1982 and 1983, the trams were converted to one man operation. The SM53 trams were retired between 1990 and 1997.

The first batch of 30 Høka trams were built between 1952 and 1953, numbered 204-233. These were originally designated MBO 50. The second batch of 12 trams was built in 1957, designated MBO 55, and numbered 234-245. The final batch, numbered 246-253 was built in 1958, and designated MBO 56. The designations were later revised to SM53/I, SM53/II, and SM53/III respectively. The trams were 14.7 metres long, 2.5 metres wide, and had a weight of 16.9 tons. Tram number 234 is preserved by the Oslo Tramway Museum.

=== Graakalbanen Class 3 ===
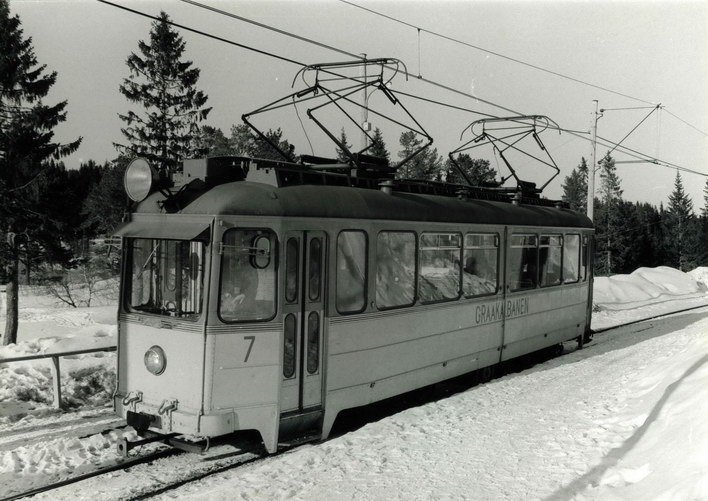
GB Class 3 tram of the Trondheim Tramway

Class 3 was a single tram and trailer built for Graakalbanen of Trondheim. Each of the four Siemens motors had an effect of 60 kW (80 hp). The trams were criticized for not having sufficient space for baby buggies. Despite running in part in city streets, the trams were 2.6 m (8.5 ft) wide. They had seating for 40, later 36, passengers. The tram was delivered in 1955. It remained in service until 1973, when it was replaced by the TS Class 7 trams, following the merger of Graakalbanen into Trondheim Trafikkselskap. It is preserved as a heritage tram at Trondheim Tramway Museum.
