= Gråkallen Line =

Tram line in Trondheim, Norway

Coordinates: 63°24′51″N 10°22′38″E

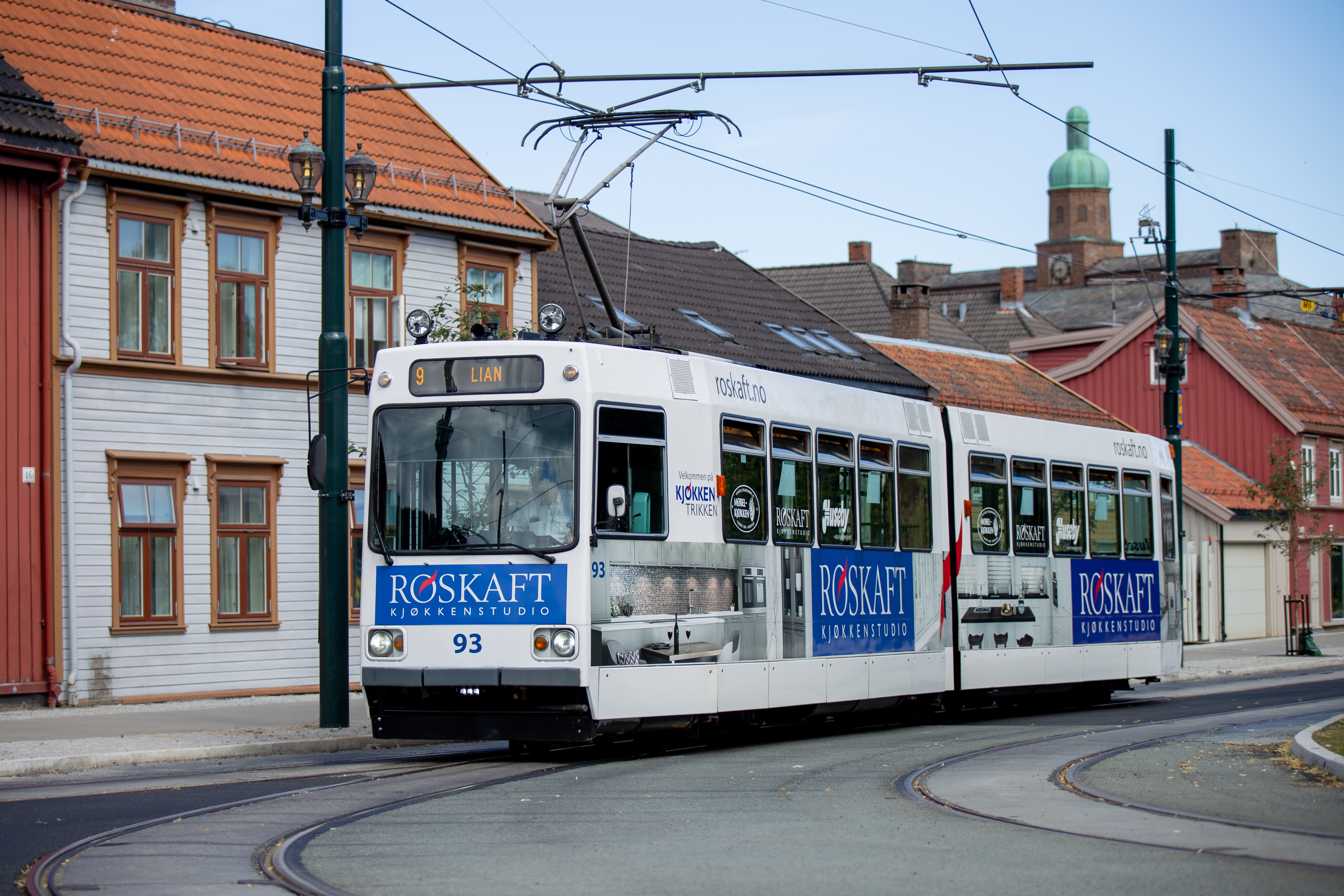
- One of the Gråkallbanen trams by Ilaparken

Overview
- Native name: Gråkallbanen
- Owner: Municipality of Trondheim
- Termini: St. Olavs Gate; Lian
- Stations: 20

Service
- Type: Tramway
- System: Trondheim Tramway
- Operator: Boreal Bane

History
- Opened: 1924

Technical
- Line length: 7.4 km (4.6 mi) (1924–88); 8.8 km (5.5 mi) (1990–)
- Number of tracks: Single (double in the city streets)
- Track gauge: 1,000 mm (3 ft 3 3/8 in) metre gauge
- Electrification: 600 V DC overhead
Route map

The Gråkallen Line (Norwegian: Gråkallbanen) is an 8.8-kilometre (5.5 mi) suburban tram line located in Trondheim, Norway. As the only remaining part of the Trondheim Tramway, it runs from the city centre at St. Olav's Gate, via the suburban area Byåsen to Lian. It is designated Line 9 (previously Line 1), and is served by six Class 8 articulated trams. After the closure of the Arkhangelsk tramway in 2004, it became the world's northernmost tramway system.

The line was opened as the only private tramway in Trondheim by A/S Graakalbanen in 1924. At first it was built to Munkvoll, but extended to Ugla in 1925, and to Lian in 1933. Operations were taken over by the municipal Trondheim Trafikkselskap in 1972, but it was closed along with the rest of the tramway in 1988. In 1990, the private initiative AS Gråkallbanen opened the line, later known as Boreal Bane. Located at Munkvoll is the tramway museum and depot.

== Service ==
The operating company Boreal Bane owns seven Class 8 trams out of the eleven delivered in 1984-85 for the then longer route. The trams are designated with numbers 90 to 100. Of the eleven delivered, Trams 93, 94, 95, 96, 97 and 99 remain in service. 91, 92, 98 and 100 have been scrapped, while 90 is out of service but remains at the depot. Four trams are required for the daily operation on the line on a fixed 15 minute headway, reducing to two trams running on a 30-minute headway in the evenings and the full day on Sundays. Heritage trams are available for chartered tours.

== History ==
=== Establishment ===
During the 1910s, Fjellseter close to the peak Gråkallen had been one of the main recreational areas for Trondheim. The necessary initiative was taken by Robert Millar, chief of marketing at Nordenfjeldske Dampskibsselskab. On 3 November, the first meeting was held, and Millar was chosen to lead an investigation committee. The company A/S Graakalbanen was founded on 6 September 1916, and Nils Christoffer Bøckman was elected chairman.

There were two suggestions for the route. The first was made by engineer Ferdinand Bjerke, who worked for the Norwegian State Railways, on behalf of the company. The line would connect to the city tramway at Ilevolden after following the Ila Line for Torvet, and continue up Byåsenveien as a street tram until Bergsli gate. Here it would continue in its own right-of-way, as a single track line up Nyveibakken, past Gamle Åsvei to Bygrensen, Breidablikk, turning west at Hoem, Rognheim and to Munkvoll. From Munkvoll it would continue south of Kyvannet and north of Lianvannet and then again head north to Fjeldseter.

The second suggestion was from the city planner, Trygve Thesen, in 1917. He proposed alternative routes. While the upper sections were identical or close to those of Bjerke, Thesen suggested making a large loop around Dyrborg, just west of Ila. This was expected to be the immediate growth area for the city, and would give an improved passenger base for the line. It would, however, increase the travel distance to the upper sections. The city planner presumed that the section within the city limit would be built by the municipal Trondhjems Elektricitetsværk og Sporvei, while the section in Strinda would be built by the new company. This would cost the city 743,000 kr, while it would cost the company NOK 413,000.

Graakalbanen was sceptical about the suggestion from Thesen, since they would have to rent 4 km (2.5 mi) instead of 1.4 km (0.87 mi) of track from the city; this would increase the leasing fees from NOK 7,000 to 12,000. The company was also afraid of passengers "leaking" off at Wullumsgården south of the Dyrborg Loop, and walking to Ila. The Dyrborg suggestion would also increase the travel time from Torvet to Fjellseter from 36 to 57 minutes. However, the city planner's suggestion was cheaper (NOK 1,300,000 vs. NOK 1,630,000). Bøchman recommended Bjerke's suggestion, and the board agreed. After the hotel at Fjellseter burnt down in 1917, the line was chosen to only terminate at Lian.

At the same time the end terminal in the city centre was not yet determined. By terminating at Ilevolden, the company could choose any rolling stock, including the higher 1,200 V current used on the Ekeberg Line of Oslo. Should the trams continue they would need to use Trondheim Sporvei's 600 V, metre gauge and car width. However, Trondheim Sporvei had chosen to convert its system to wide cars at 2.6 m (8 ft 6 in) width. If the city chose to start the rebuilding of track from the current 1,000 mm (3 ft 3 3/8 in) gauge, it would allow Graakalbanen to buy wider stock. Instead it was chosen to run the trams along the Ila Line to a new station at St. Olavs Gate. Here, the trams would have their recovery time, and return to the Ila Line along a loop through Dronningens gate. The 232 m (761 ft) loop was built by Trondheim Sporvei and cost the city NOK 54,000.

=== Construction ===
The first conveying started in 1917, and the following January the city engineer started construction, but this soon ended. In June 1919, the engineering company Grøndahl & Kjørholt took over the work, planning to be finished to Lian by 1921. However, by June 1920, the rising prices resulted in the money being used up. At the same time it turned out that the rolling stock was too much more expensive than expected; ordering of rolling stock was therefore delayed. In 1921, no construction was done on the line. Not before Trondhjems og Stridens Sparebank issued a loan of NOK 1.6 million was it possible to continue construction. This was based on mortgaging all assets, as well as a NOK 500,000 guarantee from the city council. While work previously had been along the whole route, it was then only concentrated on the section Ila–Munkvoll, where the depot would be located.

Tracks were delivered from the Norwegian State Railways, who were replacing their 25 kg/m track on the Meråker Line. The track length was 7 m (23 ft). At the same time the company bought the truss bridge Funna Viaduct from the Meråker Line, for installation on the Gråkallen Line; it was about 20 metres too short, and a temporary wooden span was built to cover this. At Munkvoll a brick transformer station was built along with a wooden depot with three tracks and capable of nine trams and trailers.

Four trams and two trailers were ordered from Hannoversche Waggonfabrik (HaWa), with motors from Siemens. The GB Class 1 trams cost NOK 360,000, including some work trailers. The stock had bogies, were 13 m (43 ft) long and weighed 30 t (30 long tons; 33 short tons), and had 4x 50 kW (67 hp). The chassis were delivered on 20 July 1924, while the motors came on 5 July. They were assembled at the Dalsenget Depot. Because of the wider bodies, all transport from the track at Ila to Dalsenget had to be done at night, so the trams would not meet other trams in the opposite track. The first test run was on 5 July, but failed due to a short circuit. A successful attempt was made on 9 July.

The tracks were completed in March, but not until the trams were delivered could service start. The tramway was opened on 18 July 1924 at 18:00. Ordinary service started the next day. The first weekend there were thousands of people who wanted to see the new trams, and demand exceeded capacity. Soon ridership dropped considerably.

=== Expansion ===
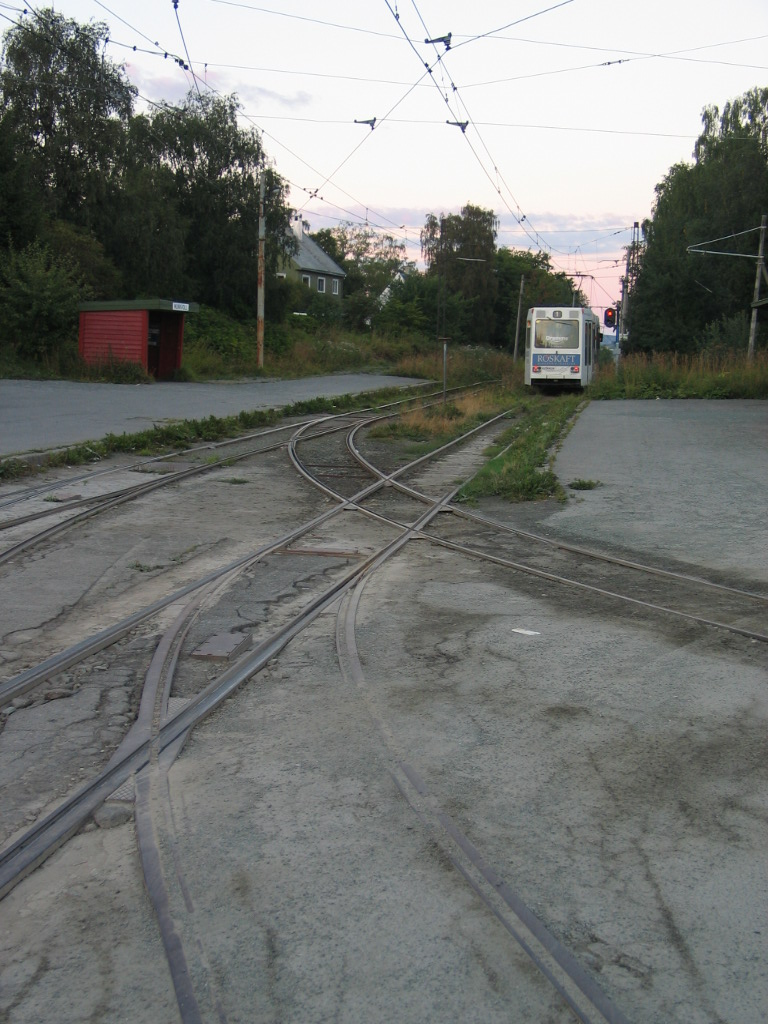
Modern view of Munkvoll tram stop

The initial service had departures once per hour. Trams left Munkvoll on the hour, and from St. Olavs gate on the half-hour. Weekend traffic was considerable, but ridership on weekdays was very limited. The management felt this was because Munkvoll was not close enough to the recreational areas of Bymarka, and proposed a quick expansion to Ugla. At the same time, the ticket price was set high compared to the city trams, at NOK 0.60 for adults. In 1924, there were 144.774 passengers.

The first expansion would come the following year. Construction of the line to Ugla had started, and was opened on 30 May 1925. It had a tavern and duck pond to attract riders. A branch was also laid to Kyvannet, from which ice was transported to the city center to be sold. The company continued to lose money.

Further expansions to Lian were also considered, but management was skeptical at having two destinations, since they would not create the necessary critical mass. Then the tavern and farm at Ugla burnt down in 1931, and the insurance company allowed the insurance money to be used for building at Lian. To finance the line extension, Graakalbanen decided to create a new company; A/S Ugla–Lian was organized in such a way that it would have no expenses, only income. A/S Ugla–Lian would build the line, and Graakalbanen would pay NOK 0.05 per passenger freighted on the line. Graakalbanen would cover all operating, maintenance and administrative expenses, even for the other company. Construction of the 2.1 km (1.3 mi) expansion was started in the autumn of 1932. The first test run was on 29 September 1933, and the line was taken into use on 28 October 1933. A number of recreational services grew up at Lian, including a ski jump and trotting in the winter, and bathing and rowing in the lake Lianvannet in the winter. Despite this, ridership grew slowly, but by 1937 it had passed the 1930-level.

=== War and growth ===
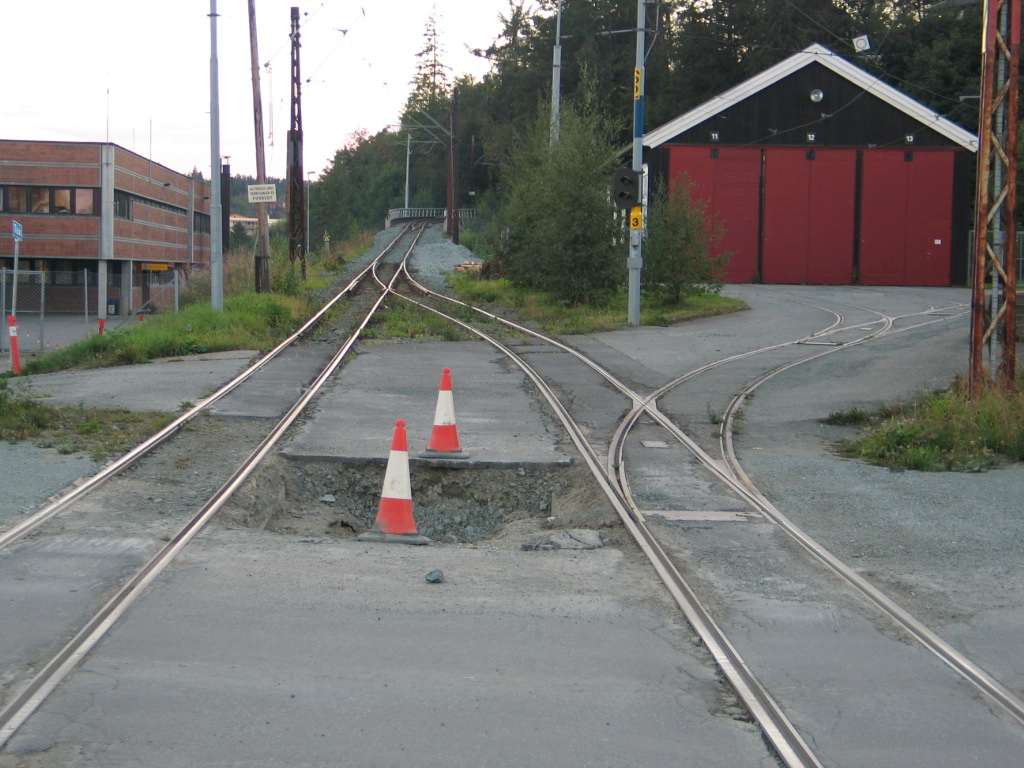
Original Munkvoll Depot to the right

World War II would show the highest ridership on the line through history. With the rationing on petrol, soon only the electric trams operated. Cities without trams or trolleybuses were stuck without public transport. 1940 showed an increase to 884,000 passengers, and for the first time the company made a profit. Ridership continued to increase, with 1.2 million in 1941, and up to 2.16 million in 1945. Conductors had to be taken into use, and even women were employed. To save time on the route, the stations Ferstad, Kyvannet, Vestmarka and Herlofssonløypa were not served on the way up. In addition, an extra tram was operated from St. Olavs gate to Hoem.

During the war it was difficult to get spare parts. Trams could operate with only three of four motors, and during night there could not be any lights on. Two working trailers were rebuilt as a single passenger trailer. In addition, the company chose to order a tram and trailer from Skabo Jernbanevognfabrikk in 1941. The GB Class 2 was put into service on 9 June 1943 and cost NOK 289,000. An additional two trailers were delivered in 1947, and in 1950 a motor arrived so the first trailer could be rebuilt to a tram.

The high revenue during the war had given the company a large amount of cash, but also a worn down fleet. Each year, the profits were between NOK 143,000 and 430,000. During the war, the company A/S Ugla–Lian had been bought. With available cash, Graakalbanen started upgrading the infrastructure. Turning loops were built at St. Olavs gate and at Lian. In St. Olavs gate, a proper turning loop was not feasible, and in June 1946 a large loop that went down Dronningens gate for a block was opened. On 13 September 1947, the Lian loop was built, with a radius of only 20 m (66 ft). At the same time, the small carhouse at Lian was expanded to house two trams instead of one.

On 18 July 1947, the first (and only) double track section of the dedicated right-of-way was built. Inspired by Oslo, where all the suburban lines had this, 800 m (2,600 ft) was rebuilt between Breidablikk and Nordre Hoem. This gave a lot better regularity, since the two trams could meet anywhere along the section, and thus both trams would not become delayed if one was. By 1949, all the track had been upgraded to 35 kg/m (71 lb/yd), and the speed could be increased from 35 km/h (22 mph) to 40 km/h (25 mph).

After the war, ridership stabilized at 1.7 million. At first the company operated with 30-minute headways, using trailers during the summer and in rush hour. Introducing 15-minute headways could not be done until six trams were available; so after the rebuilding of a trailer to a tram in 1950, the increased frequency was introduced. During the 1950s, the amount of recreational travel to Lian decreased, but this was compensated by increased traffic from new housing built along the line. By 1955, the commuter ridership exceeded the recreational ridership.

With the delivery of the new trailers in 1947, the capacity of the depot exceeded the fleet, so one tram was always stored at Lian. A new depot was therefore built on the other side of the tracks at Munkvoll. Construction started in 1952, and finished the following year. It had five tracks; three had places for storage of six wagons, while two were for the workshop that could service two trams simultaneously.

To supplement the aging stock, the GB Class 3 single tram and trailer, from Hønefoss Karrosserifabrikk (Høka) was ordered in 1954. Delivered in September 1955, it was put into service in December. Because of the increased traffic, a new signaling system was introduced in 1957, and a double track was built from Bergsli gate to Ila. This section had been causing problems for cars, since the trams would operate on the wrong side of the road. To allow a future 10-minute headway, a new signaling system was installed in 1958 up to Ugla. Up until then, tokens had been used to regulate traffic.

=== Integration ===
In 1960, the sale of cars was deregulated, and anyone could purchase a car. At the same time, Trondheim started a merger process with the neighbouring municipalities, and plans were made to build large suburbs far from the city centre, that would be depopulated, and connect the suburbs with motorways. A new four-lane highway along Byåsenveien was opened in 1966. Traffic numbers fell rapidly, and the company needed to replace its aging fleet. Traffic patterns were also changing, since Lian to a greater extent was becoming a winter rather than summer destination. In 1963, Trondheim Sporvei rebuilt one of their trams so it could operate from Lade directly to Lian on holidays. In 1966, Graakalbanen was bought by the city, and Odd Hovdenak became director of both tram operators.

After being taken into public ownership, the company had more money to spend. A new turning loop was built at Munkvoll, and a 10-minute headway was introduced from St. Olavs gate to Munkvoll, and a 20-minute headway to Lian. Prices were reduced, and 1967 showed a 10% ridership increase. The signalling was improved with fixed blocks, and only Munkvoll–Lian still used tokens. The rolling stock was painted the same yellow and blue, but the coat of arms used by Trondheim Sporvei were not used on Graakalbanen.

Instead of purchasing new rolling stock for the Gråkallen Line, the city trams were to start operating on the line. However, there was a lack of material in Trondheim Sporvei, and not until 7 November 1966 could a TS Class 7 city tram be taken into use. This was supplemented with a trailer on 6 February 1967. Also, there was operated a direct route from Lian to Lade during the morning rush hour. In 1968, the company acquired five additional trams. However, Trondheim Sporvei had problems delivering the trams. With this deal in place, the oldest trams could be retired. However, from 30 June to 19 August 1968, Trondheim Sporvei needed the trams again, and the old Class 1 was back in service. The final run of the Class 1 in regular service was on 29 November 1968. From 19 May 1969 the trams lost their conductors.

Graakalbanen was on 1 January 1972 merged with Trondheim Sporvei to form Trondheim Trafikkselskap. This would allow the service to run through the city centre, and connect with other routes. From 28 January 1978, the line was numbered as 1/5 and went on the route Voldsminde–Ilevolden–Munkvoll–Lian, replacing former line 1. The terminus at St. Olavs gate was closed, and passengers were no longer offered a heated waiting room.

After the 10-minute headway was introduced on 13 April 1975, the section Ugla–Lian developed into a bottle neck. Six trams were used to handle the route between Voldsminde and Lian. An accident that occurred on the bottle neck caused substantial damage, and a fixed block signaling system was installed on the whole line.

=== More expansion? ===
During the 1960s, the Gråkallen Line experienced a large ridership increase from the Halset area. From 1956 to 1971, Halset was built out with large apartment blocks. These were the only apartment blocks along the line, as most of the route was along housing. By 1970 there were 10,500 people living along the line, and half of them were in the Munkvoll/Halset area. Graakalbanen suggested building a loop around Halset; from Munkvoll, it would follow Selsbakkveien, Allette Beyers vei, A. Andreassens vei and back into the Gråkallen Line at Rognheim. Total distance would be 1.2 km (0.75 mi), and would cost NOK 1.5 million. Ridership was estimated to increase to 1.2 million.

The Norwegian Armed Forces were sceptical, and wanted the route moved. Instead a feeder bus was put into service by Trondheim Sporvei, but passengers had to pay for both the bus and the tram, so it only attracted 278 passengers. Instead it was suggested that a walk way should be built along Waldemar Aunes vei to Rognheim, shortening the walking distance from 1,000 m (3,300 ft) to 500 m (1,600 ft), but this was never built. In 1969, Trondheim Sporvei applied for a bus concession on the route. Graakalbanen had a concession from 1952 to operate from Ugla to Haukåsen and Smistad, but had never started operation, and it was given to Trondheim Bilruter. Due to disagreements regarding whose concessions were being tampered with given a new route to Halset, Trondheim Bilruter received an extension of their concession from Havstad. From 21 November 1971, the Halset bus was in operation, served by two buses from Trondheim Bilruter, and one from Trondheim Trafikkselskap.

In 1979, a new suggestion was launched. As part of a four-line network connecting all the major suburbs, a new route was proposed branching off from Munkvoll and running through Kystad, Stavsted, Kolstad to Heimdal. The route was too expensive, and was not passed.

=== Closing and reopening ===
A tram making a trip from Lade to Lian shortly before the 1988 closure

During the 1980s there was a lot of political debate about the future of the tram in Trondheim, and in 1983 the city council decided to close down the Elgeseter Line, and keep only one line between Lian and Lade. At the same time 11 new trams were ordered and a new depot built at Munkvoll, costing over NOK 100 million. But in 1988 the city council changed their minds and closed the tramway in Trondheim. The tracks between St. Olav's Street and Lademoen were removed, but the tracks at Lade were kept, as were the tracks between St. Olav's Street and Lian. The latter was because enthusiasts had plans of operating veteran trams as a heritage railway.

But fate had other plans for Gråkallbanen. The Trondheim tramway is one of only two in the world, along with the Cairo Tramway, to use the combination of metre gauge and 2.6 metre-wide cars. This made it practically impossible to sell the trams and finance the 20 new Scania buses that Trondheim Trafikkselskap needed to operate the bus route to Lian and Lade. In the end the 11 trams were not sold and instead a company owned by 1,400 enthusiasts, AS Gråkallbanen, was created to operate the tram route on the only remaining line, that started in 1990. In 2004 Veolia Transport's division in Norway, Veolia Transport Norge, bought the company and have announced they will invest another NOK 10,7 million, after the purchase in improved infrastructure on Gråkallbanen. July 1, 2008 the company name changed from AS Gråkallbanen to Veolia Transport Bane AS. Since then the company was renamed Boreal Transport Bane AS in 2011, Boreal Transport Midt-Norge AS in 2012 and finally Boreal Bane AS in 2016.

On August 3, 2019, the line got a new number following the introduction of the new metrobuss system in Trondheim. The designation as Line 1 was handed over to a metrobuss line (Ranheim-Sentrum-Kattem) and Gråkallbanen got a new designation as Line 9.

== Plans ==
Gråkallbanen is working on a number of plans as of 2006. These include an extension of the line to the harbour area via Olav Trygvasons street and Trondheim Central Station. A short stretch from St. Olavs gate to nearby Prinsenkrysset, regarded as part of this plan, was given the green light in 2006, the building was supposed to start in 2009, when the Nordre Avlastningsvei (northern bypass) was due to open and supposedly relieve the city centre from car traffic. As of 2011 it has been decided to build the extension during the summer of 2012 when the city centre's main bus terminal is to be rebuilt. At the same time the whole section of track within the city centre will be rebuilt to meet the requirements of increased traffic and to remedy years of neglect. It is stated by Gråkallbanen that they seek to modernize their fleet of six vehicles to low-floor, to allow wheelchair users to board the trams. However, as the current operation requires additional funding from the municipality, these plans are not currently financed. The municipality is to create a report on the funding of the line and its future projects.

Furthermore, there have been several calls for an additional light rail scheme based upon the current railway lines running through the town. Lately, connecting this light rail project with Gråkallbanen to form a tram-train system have been suggested but the different track widths (Gråkallbanen uses 1,000 mm (3 ft 3 3/8 in) and the NSB lines 1,435 mm (4 ft 8 1/2 in)) might be a problem. A connecting PRT system in town has also been suggested.
