= Boreal Bane =

Norwegian transit company

Boreal Bane AS
- Trade name: Gråkallbanen
- Formerly: AS Gråkallbanen (1989–2008); Veolia Transport Bane AS (2008–2011); Boreal Transport Bane AS (2011–2012); Boreal Transport Midt-Norge AS (2012–2016)
- Type: Aksjeselskap
- Industry: Public transport
- Founded: Trondheim, Norway (14 October 1989; 36 years ago)
- Headquarters: Trondheim, Norway
- Area served: Trondheim
- Key people: Eirik Rambech-Knoff (MD); Kjetil Førsvoll (Chairman)
- Services: Tram operation
- Number of employees: 62 (2026)
- Parent: Boreal Norge AS
- Website: graakallbanen.no

Boreal Bane AS, trading, and formerly known as, AS Gråkallbanen, is a Norwegian company that operates the remaining part of the Trondheim Tramway, Norway. It operates six trams on the Gråkall Line, that connects the city centre to parts of the suburb of Byåsen, and the recreational area at Lian. It has 800,000 annual passengers, and operates as Line 1. The trams operate each 15 minutes during the day, and each 30 minutes in the evenings and during the weekends.

The company took over the last remaining part of the tramway in 1990, after the former operator Trondheim Trafikkselskap had closed the Gråkall and Lade Line in 1988. The company took over the trams and the track, and claimed it could operate without municipal subsidies. In 2005, Gråkallbanen was bought by Veolia Transport Norge, renamed Veolia Transport Bane AS in 2008, and launched aggressive plans to take over the bus transport in Trondheim. Veolia Transport Norge was demerged to become Boreal Transport Norge in May 2011, and Veolia Transport Bane became Boreal Transport Bane AS.

In November 2012, the company name was changed again, to Boreal Transport Midt-Norge AS, as a preparation for a coming PSO contract with AtB. From August 2013, the company also operated regional buses in major parts of Sør-Trøndelag. In 2016, the bus operations were moved to another Boreal subsidiary and the company was once again renamed, this time to Boreal Bane AS.

== History ==
=== Background ===
In 1988 the city council in Trondheim decided to close the Trondheim Tramway and replace it with diesel buses to save money. This was despite that the council just four years earlier had spent more than NOK 100 million on a new depot and 11 new tram cars.

The bus service in Byåsen was complicated. A temporary feeding bus was established on Gamle Oslovei and Vådanveien. Breidablikk received its own line, while another served along Uglaveien from Munkvoll to Herlofsonløypa. After the tramway was reasphalted, the bus continued to along the old right-of-way to Lian. Bygrensen was not served by any buses.

=== Initiative ===
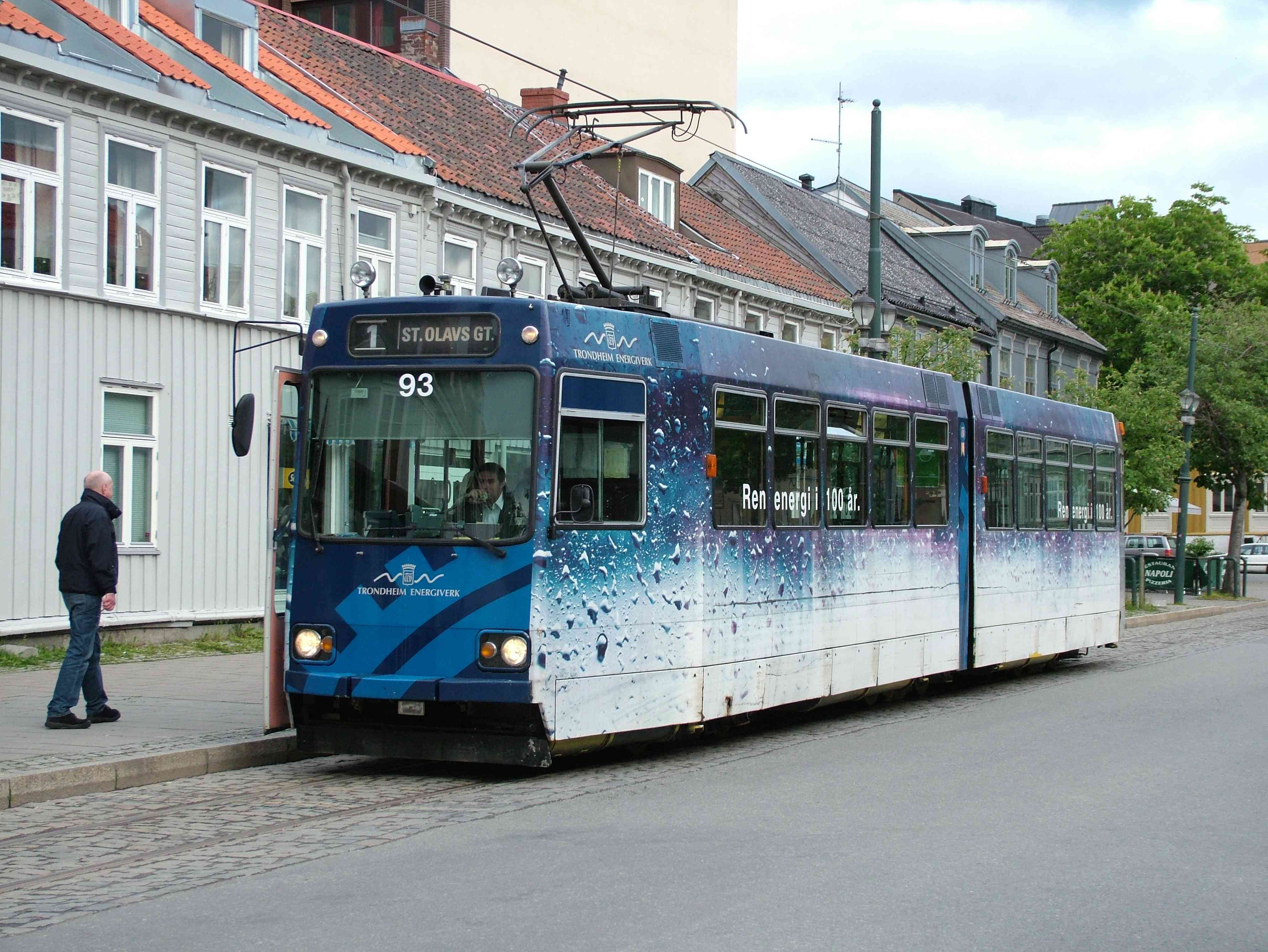
One of the Gråkallbanen's trams at the St. Olavs Gate terminus

Henry H. Tørhaug, a former tram user who lived at Bygrensen, took initiative to start Friends of the Gråkall Line (Norwegian: Gråkallbanens vennner) in October 1988. It attracted many local people in Byåsen who were dissatisfied with the bus service, along with many tram enthusiasts, and politicians from Bylista. This resulted in AS Gråkallbanen being founded. It proposed a more rational operation of the line, limited to the remaining right-of-way from St. Olavs Gate to Lian. The company offered a back door to several politicians, since it claimed it could operate the tram without municipal subsidies.

On 22 June 1989, the city council voted to re-open the line from St. Olavs Gate to Lian. After the mater was re-considered on 31 August, it passed with 42 against 40 votes. The company was free to receive subsidies from the county and the state. The new company started negotiating with TT about the details of the take-over. In particular, the number of trams to be used was a difficult matter. Gråkallbanen wanted all eleven, while TT only would give up six. In the end the politicians voted to give seven to the new company. Since the tram lines were presumed to be kept for the museum line, Gråkallbanen was not charged the extra NOK 135,000 for maintaining the tracks on the roads. The city also accepted to take economic responsibility for the heritage trams. During the discussions, TT demanded that the municipality pay NOK 23.8 million for the trams, depots and other material, but this was rejected by the city. The city also chose to give NOK 5 million to Gråkallbanen as a one-time payment, equal to the subsidies they were giving TT to operate the new bus routes in Byåsen. The negotiated agreement was passed with 51 against 34 votes in the city council.

After all the agreements were in place, TT announced on 30 December 1989 that it had found a new buyer for the trams. An agreement had been made with the Copenhagen-based Unimex Engineering, who would sell the eleven trams to the Cairo Tramway. On 2 January 1990, TT sent a letter to Gråkallbanen giving them the option to purchase the trams for the same price as the Egyptions, at an estimated NOK 17–20 million. However, Gråkallbanen pointed out to the politicians that it was possible to purchase used articulated trams for DEM 20,000 from the Stuttgart Stadtbahn. The company took the press with it to Stuttgart to negotiate the agreement, and the following Adresseavisen presented the cities new trams to the people. However, by the time the delegation had returned, they were informed that the deal had been annulled. Adresseavisen tried to locate Unimex in Copenhagen, but it turned out to be a company that had never sold a tram. At a press conference in Trondheim, the director of TT blamed Arbeider-Avisa's journalists for the deal not going through. When asked about the matter, representatives from the tramway company in Kairo said that the deal did not go through because the trams did not fit.

=== Reopening ===
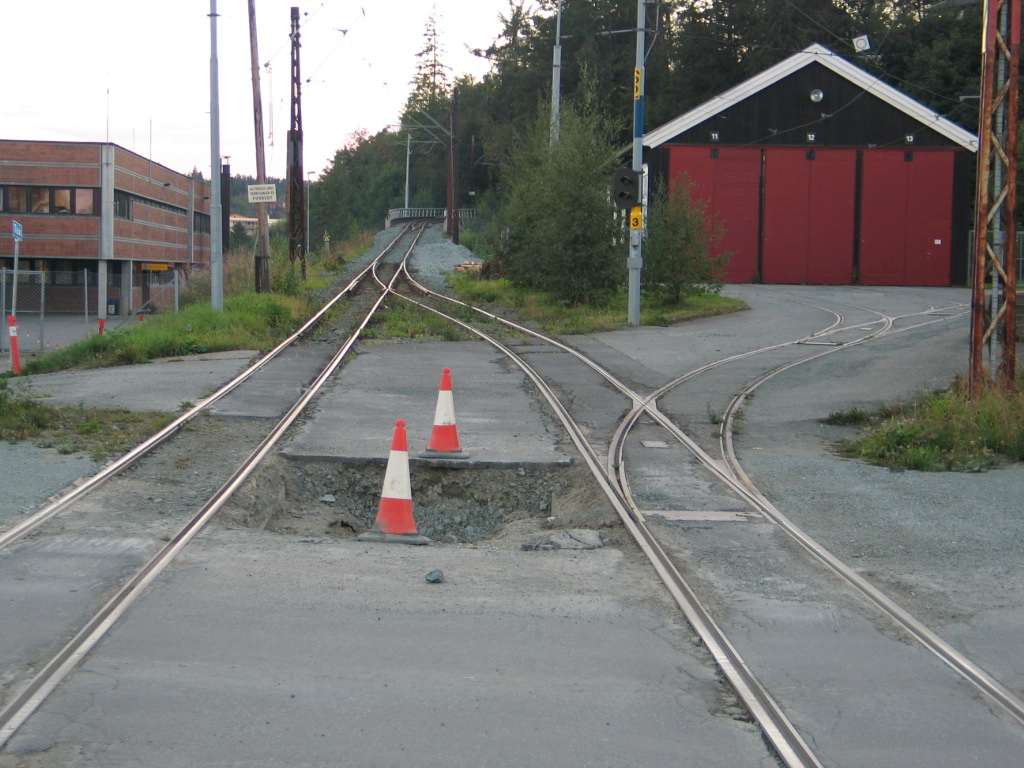
The depot at Munkvoll

The final decision to restart the trams was made by the city council on 29 March 1990. In the meantime, Bylista had changed their political support for the 1989 mayor election. Instead of supporting the Labour candidate Per Berge, they instead chose to support Marvin Wiseth from the Conservative Party, who took over as mayor 1 January 1990. The reason was that the Labour Party was not willing to give a clear support to the tramway operation. The Conservative Party, on the other hand, was more than willing to support any suggestions that involved privatization. The non-socialist parties succeeded at keeping the mayor until 2003 after this.

On 9 June the overhead wires were powered up, and from 3 July there were test-runs with some of the historic trams. Tracks and substructure were replaced between Nyveibakken and Bergsligate. A ballast tamper was rented from Germany, and the asphalt from Kyvannet to Herlofsonløypa was removed. Part of the work was done by volunteers. The night before 6 July, seven of the trams (no. 1, 2, 3, 6, 8, 9 and 11) were taken out of the depot at Lademoen, and moved by truck to Kongens Gate, where they were put onto the Gråkall Line. They were then hauled by the working machine to Munkvoll. At noon the next day the first tram took a trial run in the city streets. They kept the TT colors, but were given the GB logo. At the same time they were renumbered (90–99, with holes). The official opening was on 18 August 1990, with a parade of historic trams leading the way.

The traffic the first full year was 900,000 passengers annually, which is 20% higher than with the buses. Passenger numbers decreased until 1997, when they started rising somewhat. That year a bus corresponds with the tram at Breidablikk, and offers a correspondence with Marienborg, St. Olavs Hospital and Øya. During the 2000s, the ridership has stabilized at about 800,000.

=== Takeover ===
In 2005, a 67% stake of the company was taken over by Veolia Transport Norge (at the time named Connex). Approved by the general assembly on 11 April 2005, Veolia promised additional capital of NOK 10.7 million to the company. It only paid a few million for the shares. In 2005, the municipality made a new ten-year agreement concerning the operation of the tramway. The ownership of the nine trams were transferred to Gråkallbanen, so they no longer needed to pay comprehensive insurance that was at NOK 250,000.

After the Veolia take-over, Gråkallbanen launched several plans to become a larger company in Trondheim. In 2007, it announced that it would apply to take over all bus routes in the city, that at the time were operated by Team Trafikk (the successor of Trondheim Trafikkselskap). The company has launched several ambitious suggestions for routes to supplement Team Trafikk, but has yet to receive permission to operate any of them. The same year, the Socialist Left Party announced that it wanted to renationalize the company, but Veolia has said it has no intentions to sell the company back to the city.

=== Plans ===
Gråkallbanen has plans expanding the present line from St. Olav's Gate to either Prinsens Gate (one block away) or to Trondheim Central Station and onwards to Pirterminalen. This expansion would cost about NOK 80 million and would be paid by the city.
