= Dronningens Gate tram stop =

Tram stop in Midtbyen, Trondheim, Norway

Coordinates: 63°25′37″N 10°23′35″E

Dronningens gate

General information
- Location: Midtbyen
- Line: Gråkallbanen

History
- Opened: 1948
Location

Dronningens gate is a tram stop on the Trondheim Tramway, Norway, that was constructed in 1948 when a loop was built in city center for the trams on the Gråkall Line. After the Archangelsk Tramway was closed in 2004 the stop became the most northerly tram stop in the world. The station is only served by outbound trams, and is within short walking distance of the two closest stops. It serves primarily residential areas.

| Preceding station | Trondheim Tramway | Following station |
|---|---|---|
| Hospitalskirka towards Lian | Gråkallbanen | St. Olavs Gate Terminus |
