= Munkvoll tram stop =

Bus and tram stop in Byåsen, Trondheim, Norway

Coordinates: 63°23′51″N 10°21′27″E

Munkvoll
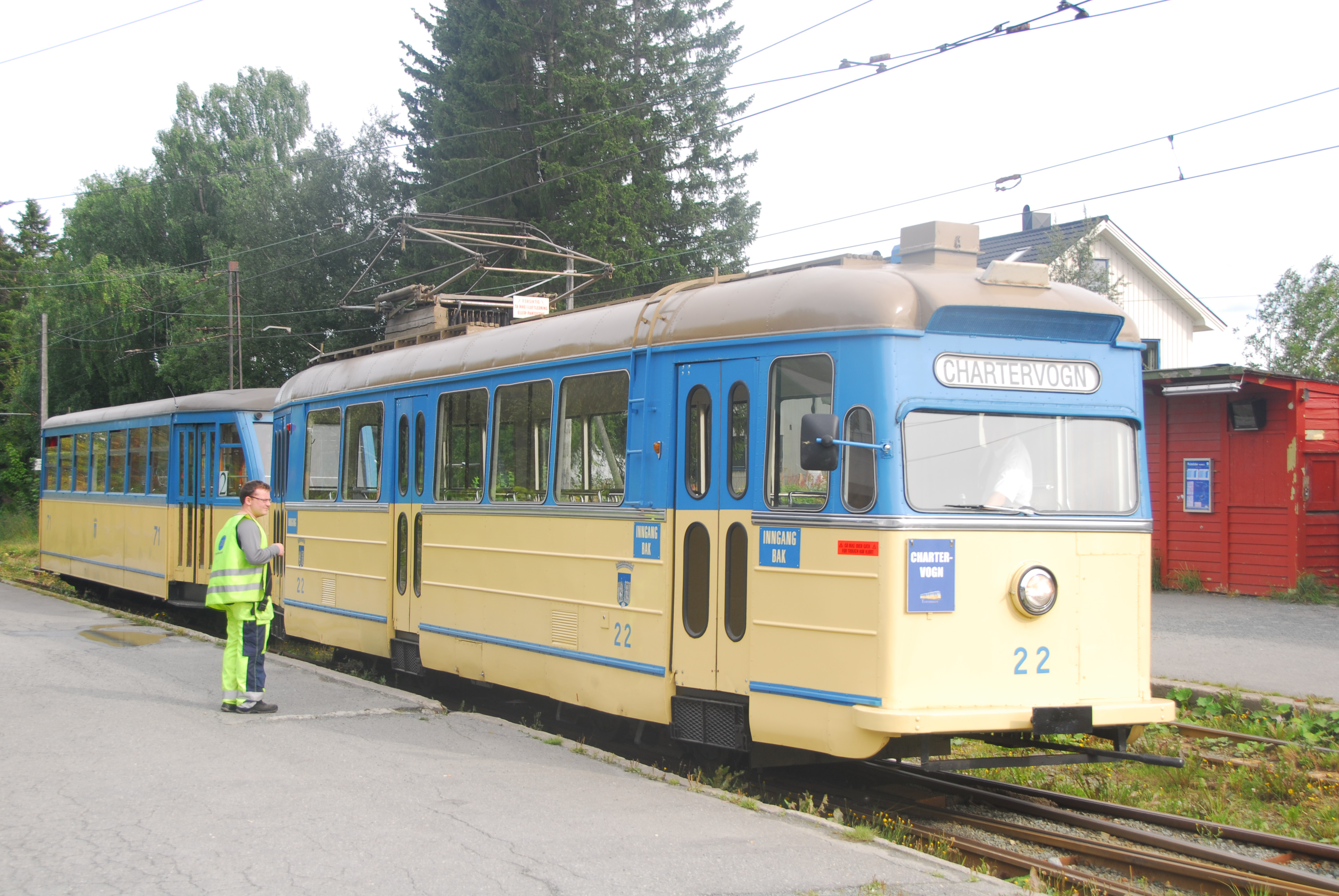

General information
- Location: Byåsen
- Line: Gråkallbanen
- Connections: Buses: 5 Dragvoll - Buenget; 9 Dragvoll - Sandmoen

History
- Opened: 1924
Location

Munkvoll Station (Munkvoll stasjon) is a tram station on Gråkallbanen. It is part of the Trondheim Tramway in Trondheim, Norway. The station was built in 1924 as the terminus for the tramway. In addition to housing the Trondheim Tramway Museum, it features the offices and depot for the tram operator, Boreal Bane. The station also features one of the double track stretches on the line, where trams can pass.

| Preceding station | Trondheim Tramway | Following station |
|---|---|---|
| Ferstad towards Lian | Gråkallbanen | Rognheim towards St. Olavs Gate |

== See also ==
- Munkvoll Depot
