= Dronningens gate =

Dronningens gate ("Queen's Street") is the name of two rail stations in Norway:

- Dronningens gate (station, Oslo)
- Dronningens gate (station, Trondheim)
