= Mathias Eckhoff =

Norwegian businessman

- Occupation: businessperson

Mathias Eckhoff was a Norwegian businessperson.

Eckhoff moved to Trondheim in 1899, as an associate of Spørch & Co. He bought Kortmans Sodafabrikk in 1908, and expanded the company rapidly. On 6 September 1916, he was elected chairman of the newly created Graakalbanen, that would build a suburban tramway. Eckhoff was a key player in selling sufficient stocks, and purchasing the necessary properly along the line to finance the construction. He died in 1925.
