= Lian, Norway =

Park area in Trondheim, Norway

Coordinates: 63°24′15″N 10°19′15″E

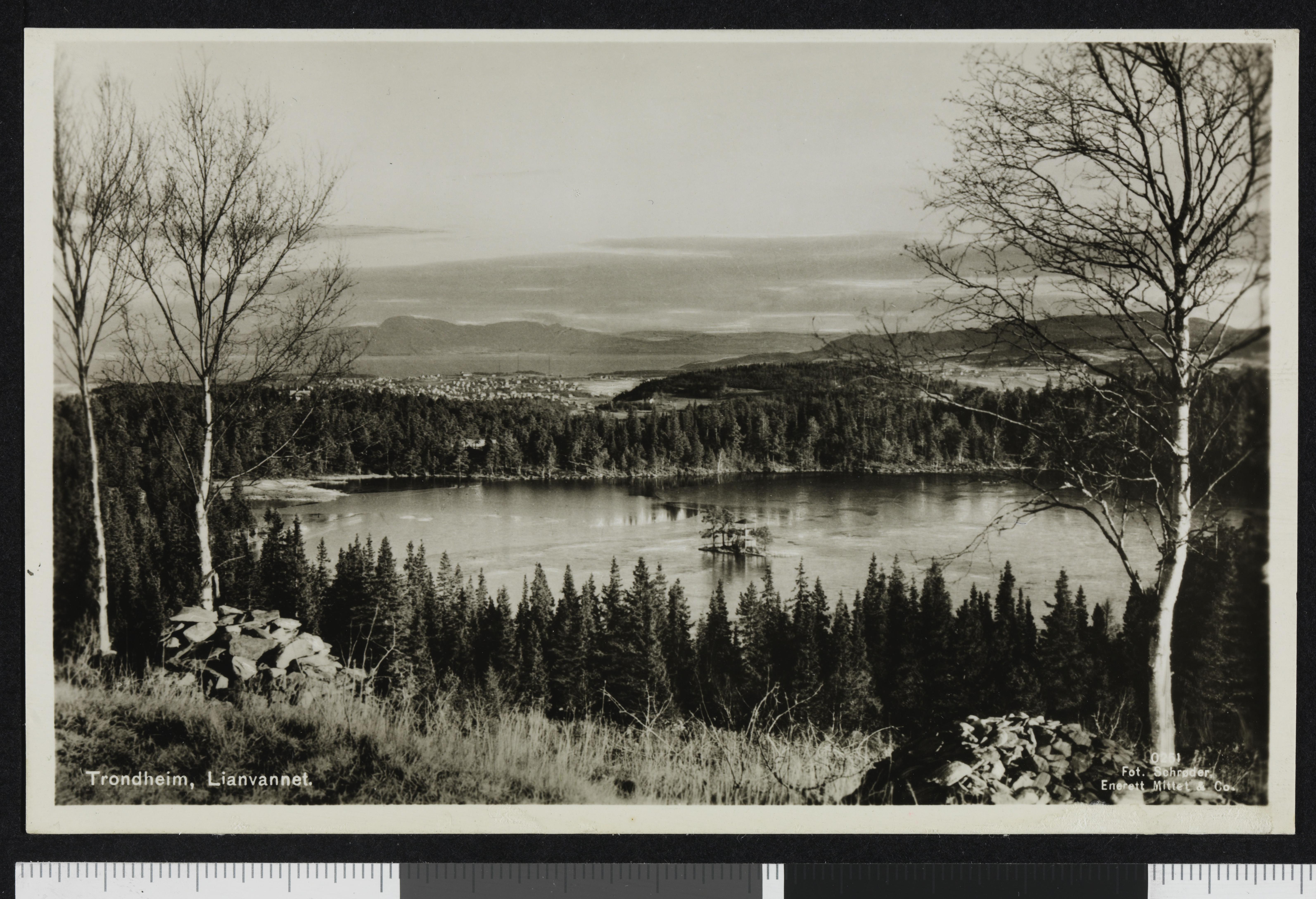
Historic picture of Lianvannet

Lian is a recreational area located west of the city centre of Trondheim in Trøndelag county, Norway. It is situated on the border between the neighborhood of Byåsen and the forested area of Bymarka. The site came into popular recreational use in 1933 when the Gråkallen Line (Gråkallbanen) of the Trondheim Tramway was extended. Lian tram stop remains the terminus of Gråkallbanen.

With the arrival of the tramway, a ski jump was built and Lian Restaurant was opened at the end of the line. The area became a primary location for winter sports in the city. Lianvannet was an important swimming place during the summer and was also possible to rent row boats. A dancing area was also built.

From 1925, the frozen lake was used for harness racing, with up to 6,000 watchers. In 1927, A/S Graakalbanen offered the trotting association 100 hectare of land for a harness racing course, although the association did not except the deal since the tramway was not yet built. Instead they established Leangen Travbane at Leangen. During World War II, the new field was confiscated by the German occupation forces.

The area around Lian has many cabins and some houses. About sixty cabins are illegally permanently occupied; only those buildings occupied from before 1967 may legally be permanently lived in. In 2008, the city suggested giving an amnesty for those who live in illegal houses, but have suggested changing reconstruction regulations for all houses in the area. This will in essence decrease the house value of legal housing (which come under restrictions) to illegal housing (which now may be sold as permanent housing). This created a local controversy.
