= Nils Christoffer Bøckman =

Norwegian businessman (1880–1973)

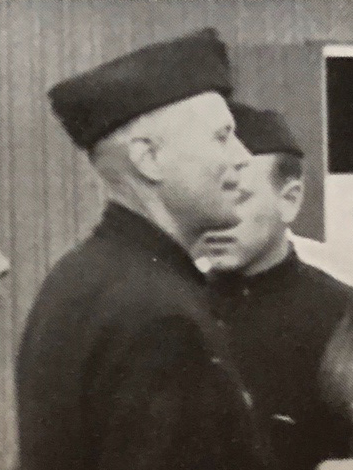
Nils Christoffer Bøckman as a prisoner in the Grini concentration camp in Norway.

Nils Christoffer Bøckman (6 July 1880 – 22 December 1973) was a Norwegian lieutenant-colonel and businessperson.

Born in Trondheim, Bøckman was educated at the military academy, graduating as lieutenant in 1901. He was promoted to captain in 1905, major in 1930, and lieutenant-colonel as part of his participation in World War II in Northern Norway.

Bøckman started working for Meråker Brug, where he was responsible for the estates in Verdal Municipality. He was also secretary of Trondhjems Skiklub. In 1916, he was elected into the board of the tramway company Graakalbanen. In 1919, he was hired as director of the company, and would remain in the position until 1966, when the company was nationalized. During World War II, two members of the company's board were executed. When Bøckman would not call in the Nazi-appointed board that replaced them, he was arrested and spent the rest of the war in the prison camps Falstad and Grini. Being arrested on 2 March 1943, he was imprisoned at Grini from 19 March 1944 to 8 May 1945.
