= Dyrborg =

Neighborhood in the city of Trondheim, Norway

- Neighborhood in Trondheim
- Interactive map of Dyrborg
- Coordinates: 63.4260°N 10.3660°E
- Country: Norway
- Region: Central Norway
- County: Trøndelag
- Municipality: Trondheim Municipality
- Borough: Midtbyen
- Elevation: 76 m (249 ft)
- Time zone: UTC+01:00 (CET)
  - Summer (DST): UTC+02:00 (CEST)

Dyrborg is a neighborhood in the city of Trondheim in Trøndelag county, Norway. It is a residential area that is located in the borough of Midtbyen in Trondheim Municipality, just southwest of the neighborhood of Ila, north of Byåsen, and south-west of Trolla.
