= Munkvoll Depot =

Norway tramway depot

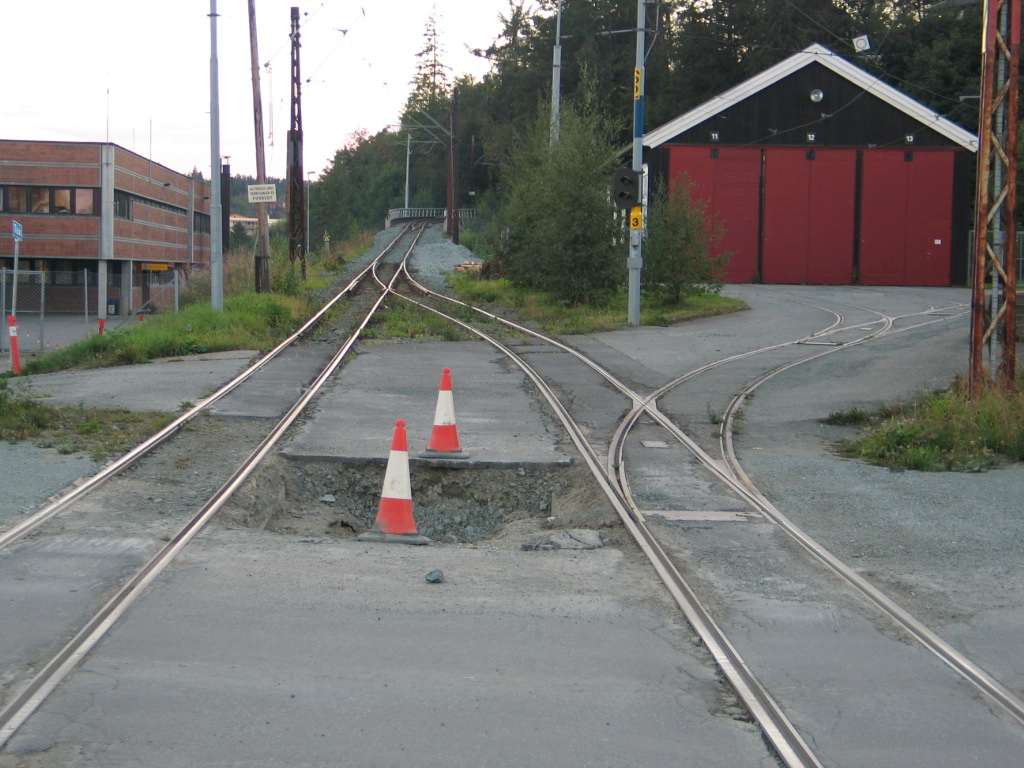
The museum to the right, the current depot to the left

Munkvoll Depot is the only remaining depot of the Trondheim Tramway, in Trondheim, Norway.

The depot was first built in 1924 for Graakalbanen. Located beside the transformer station, It was located at Munkvoll, the then terminus of the Gråkallen Line. In 1953, a second hangar-style depot building was built on the other side of the track. This was razed in 1983 to make way for the current building. The new depot building serves the current fleet of nine Class 8 trams, while the old building hosts the Trondheim Tramway Museum.
