= Ferdinand Bjerke =

Norwegian railway engineer

Ole Jacob Ferdinand Bjerke (1874 – 26 June 1946) was a Norwegian railway engineer. He graduated from Christiania Technical School in 1893, and started working for the Norwegian State Railways.

Bjerke first worked on the Gjøvik Line, then on the Bergen Line and the Dovre Line. From 1911 to 1918, he was in charge of the rebuilding of Trondheim Central Station. During his period in Trondheim, he was involved in the plans for the Gråkallen Line of the Trondheim Tramway, and made the plans for the route, and sat on the board. His main achievement was participating as senior engineer with the work on the Flåm Line. Before the construction could begin, he had been dispatched to study different railway types in the Alps.
