= Lian tram stop =

Tram stop in Bymarka, Trondheim, Norway

Coordinates: 63°24′10″N 10°18′51″E

Lian Station

General information
- Location: Bymarka
- Line: Gråkallbanen

History
- Opened: 1933
Location

Lian Station is the terminus of Gråkallbanen, the remaining part of the Trondheim Tramway in Trondheim, Norway. The Lian terminus serves as the main access point to the city's largest recreational area, Bymarka, which is west of Byåsen.

The station was built for the third expansion of line and opened in 1933. Until 1947, the trams had to change direction at the station, but in that year a loop was built allowing the trams to continue back along the loop.

Preceding station	Trondheim Tramway	Following station
Terminus	Gråkallbanen	Herlofsonløypa towards St. Olavs Gate
