= TS Class 7 =

Class of Norwegian trams

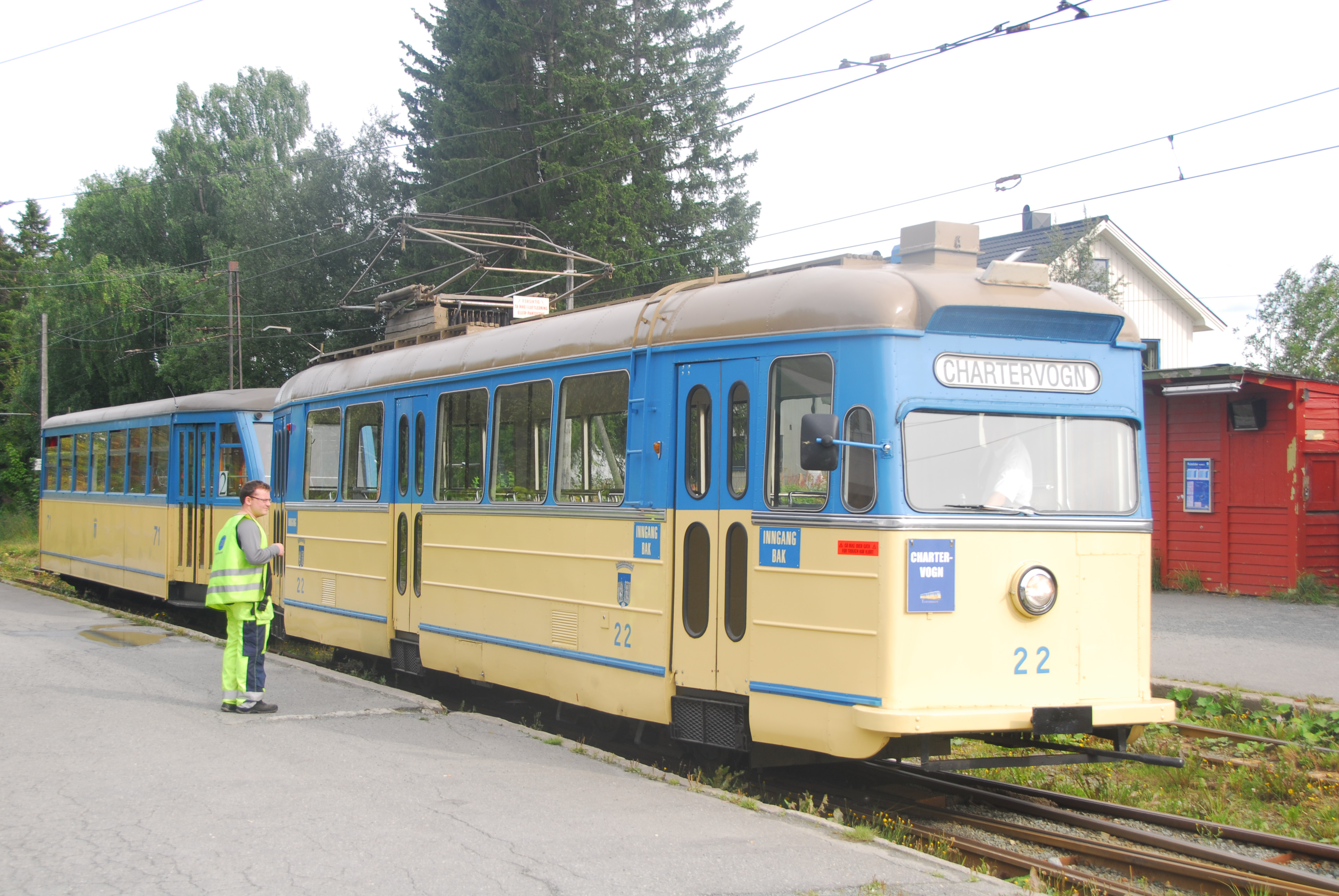
- Manufacturer: Strømmen
- Constructed: 1956–57
- Entered service: 1956
- Scrapped: 1984–85
- Number built: 28 (trams); 15 (trailers)
- Number preserved: 4
- Fleet numbers: 1–5, 10–32
- Capacity: 33 (seated) + 52 (standing)
- Operators: Trondheim Sporvei

Specifications
- Car length: 13.2 m (43 ft 4 in)
- Width: 2.6 m (8 ft 6 in)
- Doors: 6
- Weight: 15.0 t (14.8 long tons; 16.5 short tons)
- Prime mover(s): NEBB GDTM 1252
- Power output: 172 kW (231 hp)
- Current collection: Pantograph
- Track gauge: 1,000 mm (3 ft 3 3/8 in)

TS Class 7 was a series of 28 trams and 15 trailers built by Strømmens Værksted for Trondheim Sporvei. They were delivered in 1956–57.

On 10 October 1956, almost all operative trams used by the company were lost to the flames. Subsequently, Trondheim Sporvei ordered the Class 6 from Strømmen. Five engines were salvaged from the fire, and were reused in trams 1 through 5. The remaining deliveries were numbered 10–32. The trams delivered with new motors, had four NEBB motors with a power output of 43 kW (58 hp). The Class 6 remained in service until 1984, when the Class 8 was delivered. Until then, the Class 7 served as the only tram on the Trondheim Tramway. Four trams and one trailer have been preserved by the Trondheim Tramway Museum.
