= Trondheim Tramway Museum =

Coordinates: 63.4306°N 10.3577°E

- Sporveismuseet i Trondheim
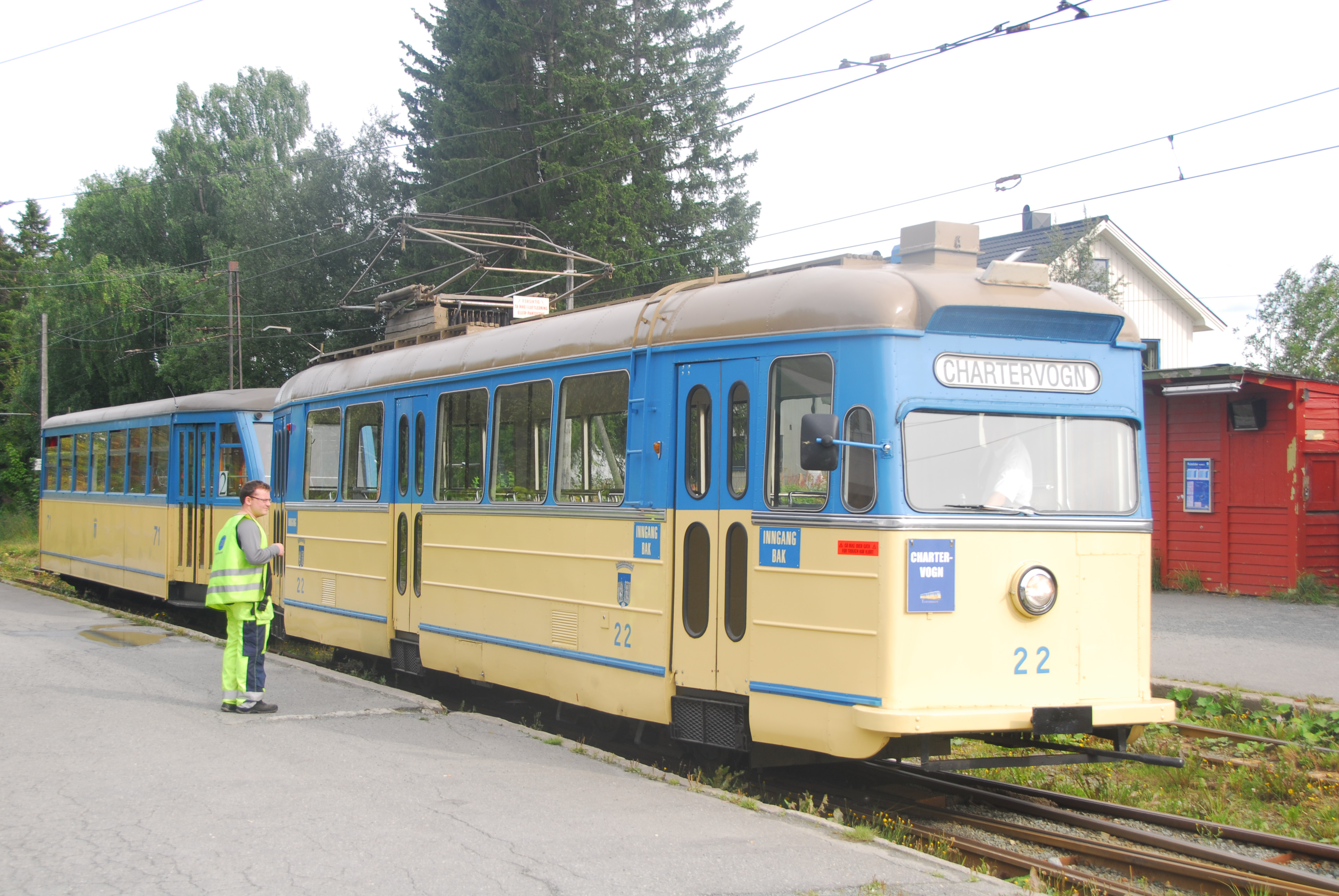
- A Class 7 Strømmen-tram and Leopold trailer at the museum.
- Established: 1994
- Location: Vognhallveien 1b, 7023 Trondheim, Norway
- Type: railway museum
- Website: sporveishistoriskforening.no/museet/

Trondheim Tramway Museum

Technical
- Track gauge: 1,000 mm (3 ft 3 3/8 in) metre gauge

Trondheim Tramway Museum (Sporveismuseet i Trondheim) is a tram museum located in Trondheim, Norway. The museum offers in addition to a display of the tramway history of Trondheim also heritage trips with old trams on the sole remains of the tramway in Trondheim, Gråkallbanen. The museum has many heritage trams on display, several in working condition. The museum society was founded in 1979 and moved to its present location at the tramway depot at Munkvoll Station after the Trondheim Tramway was closed in 1988. The museum was opened in 1995, but is only open in the summer.
