= Byåsen =

Neighborhood in the city of Trondheim, Norway

- Neighborhood in Trondheim
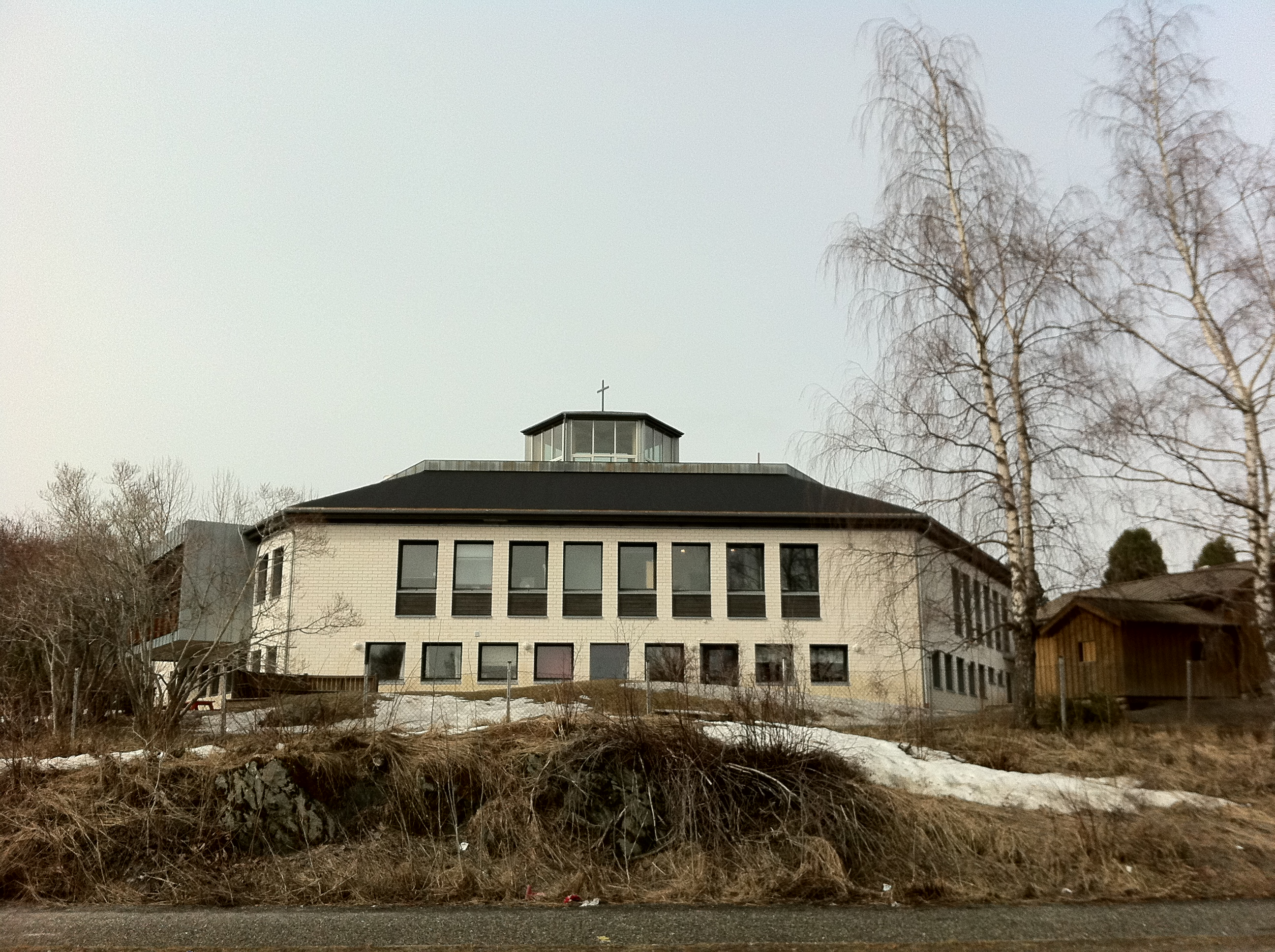
- View of the Byåsen Church
- Interactive map of Byåsen
- Coordinates: 63.3966°N 10.3484°E
- Country: Norway
- Region: Central Norway
- County: Trøndelag
- Municipality: Trondheim Municipality
- Borough: Midtbyen
- Elevation: 135 m (443 ft)
- Time zone: UTC+01:00 (CET)
  - Summer (DST): UTC+02:00 (CEST)

Byåsen is a large neighborhood area in the city of Trondheim in Trøndelag county, Norway. It constitutes a large part of the city in the borough of Midtbyen in Trondheim Municipality. It encompasses a number of areas southwest of the main city centre. This includes all areas on the west side of the river Nidelva and north of Granåsen. This is mainly a residential area, with 32,136 residents as of 1 January 2003. Gråkallbanen tram line connects Byåsen to the city centre along with a number of bus routes (8, 5, and 19) as well as night time services by bus and tram in the weekends.

The name Byåsen can be translated into "city hill", which describes its elevated position, overlooking the rest of Trondheim. The view of Trondheim can be seen from Utsikten (meaning "the view") around which the wealthier residents of Byåsen live. House prices in the area are considerably higher than other parts of the city. Byåsen is the only larger district in Trondheim that has a solid rock underground.

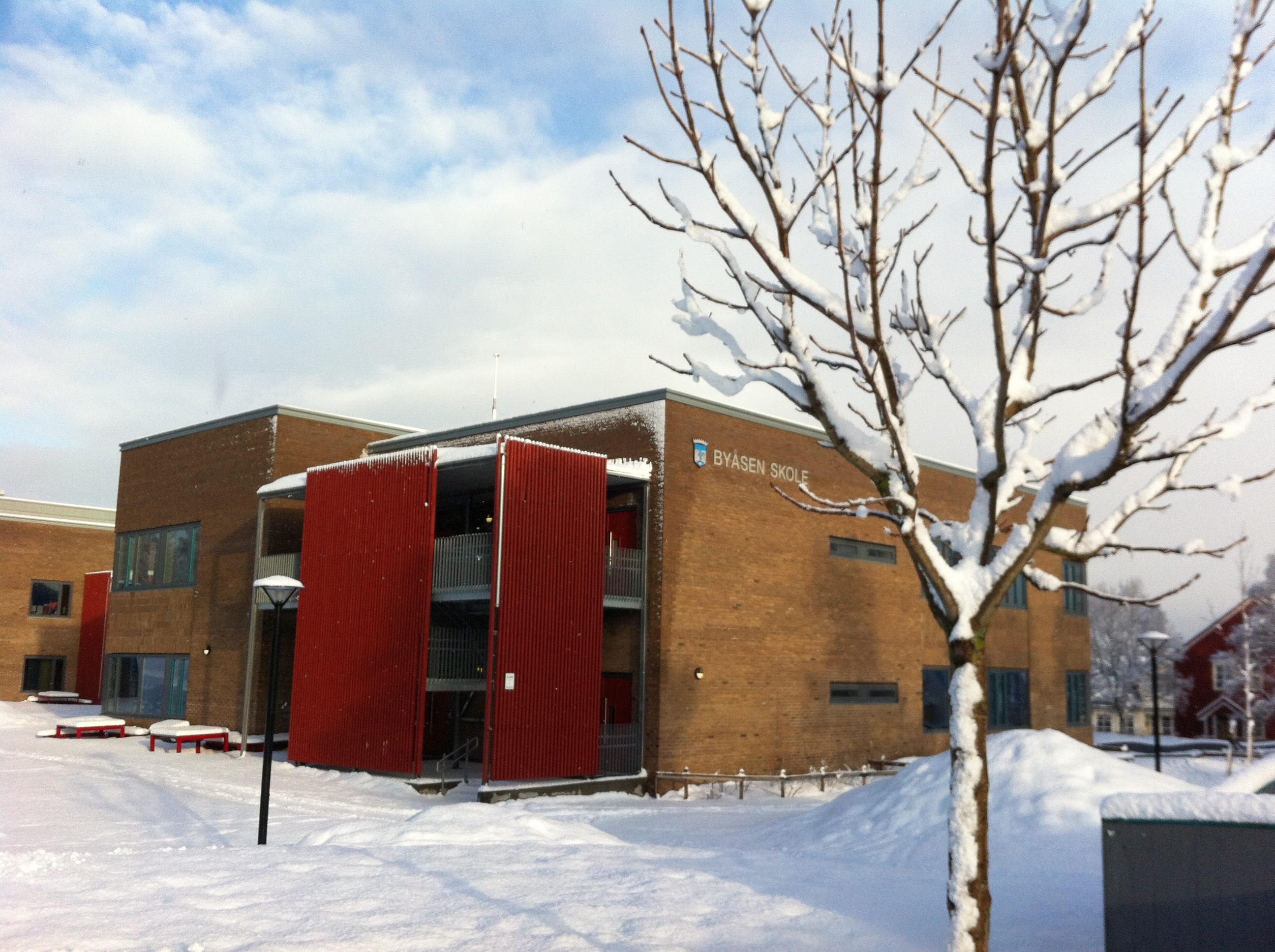
Byåsen School

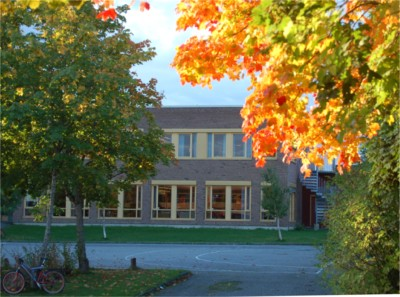
Hallset School

As a consequence of its position above the rest of the city (from 100 to 300 metres (330 to 980 ft) above sea level) there is more snow on Byåsen during the winter than in lower parts of Trondheim. Bymarka, located on the southern and western part of Byåsen, is a large recreational area with forest and lakes, which is very popular for cross country skiing in the winter season. The weather conditions and the extensive network of cross country tracks in this area helped Granåsen, an outdoor winter sporting arena situated at the south end of Bymarka, in hosting the FIS Nordic World Ski Championships in 1997. Trondheim Golfklubb golf course is also based on Byåsen, although these same weather conditions complicate matters and shortens the season. There is also an 18-hole golf course located at Byneset in the western lowland area of Trondheim.

At the end of the last ice age, between 10,000 and 11,500 years ago, the sea level was about 175 metres (574 ft) higher than it is today. The old sea level is still visible in the landscape forming a line along the hill which can be seen from the city. This line is called the Strandline (Strandlinje) and is most easily spotted from Kristiansten Fortress which is located to the east of the city centre. A path following Strandlinje is today popular with visitors to the city forest area of Bymarka which covers the most elevated parts of Byåsen.

== Hallset ==
Hallset is a part of the area of Byåsen. It has several apartment blocks and is a suburban area. Hallset consists of Hallset School (Hallset Skole), a grammar school for children aged 6–12 years, and Selsbakk School (Selsbakk Skole), a junior high for children aged 13–16 years old. It also has a church historically called Hallset Church (Hallset Kirke) but now known as Byåsen Church (Byåsen kirke).
