= List of boroughs in Trondheim prior to 2005 =

Until 2005, these were the boroughs (after the municipality mergers in the 1960s) in the city of Trondheim, Norway:

- Sentrum
  - Midtbyen
  - Øya-Singsaker
  - Rosenborg-Møllenberg
  - Lademoen
  - Lade
  - Strindheim
- Strinda
  - Charlottenlund-Jakobsli
  - Ranheim
  - Berg-Tyholt
  - Åsvang-Stokkan
  - Jonsvatnet
  - Moholt
- Nardo
  - Nardo
  - Nidarvoll-Leira
  - Risvollan-Othilienborg
  - Bratsberg
- Byåsen
  - Ila-Trolla
  - Sverresborg
  - Byåsen
  - Hallset
- Heimdal
  - Flatåsen-Saupstad
  - Heimdal
  - Sjetne-Okstad
  - Tiller/Tillerbyen
  - Kattem
  - Byneset-Leinstrand
