= Student Welfare Organisation in Trondheim =

- Company type: Student welfare organisation
- Industry: Student welfare
- Founded: 1948
- Headquarters: Trondheim, Norway
- Area served: Trondheim, Norway
- Key people: Knut Jørgen Vie (Chairman)
- Number of employees: 350 (2023)
- Subsidiaries: SiT Tapir
- Website: www.sit.no

The Student Welfare Organisation in Trondheim (Norwegian: Studensamskipnaden i Trondheim) or SiT is the student welfare organisation in Trondheim, Norway and is responsible for the welfare of about 25,000 students at the Norwegian University of Science and Technology (NTNU), and Queen Maud's College of Early Childhood Education (DMMH).

Among the responsibilities of SiT include housing for 3000 students, four gyms, kindergarten places, ten cafés, the seven book stores SiT Tapir, psychologists, advisors, career centre, heath station and economic support arrangements. The housing for students is located at Berg, Singsaker, Øya, Moholt, Jakobsli, Lerkendal, Teknobyen, Nedre Berg and Steinan. About 20% of students in Trondheim have accommodation through SiT. Facilities are located on ten campuses in town, including Gløshaugen, Dragvoll, Øya, Tyholt, Kalvskinnet, Moholt, Leangen, Rotvoll, Tunga, Trondheim and DMMH.

SiT is led by a board, with the majority and chairman being students. Other representatives are from NTNU and HiST as well as the employees in SiT. The highest organ for welfare activities is Velferdstinget (the welfare parliament) that has 17 student members.
