= Strinda =

Neighborhood in the city of Trondheim, Norway

- Neighborhood in Trondheim
- Interactive map of Strinda
- Coordinates: 63.41545°N 10.44604°E
- Country: Norway
- Region: Central Norway
- County: Trøndelag
- Municipality: Trondheim Municipality
- Borough: Lerkendal
- Elevation: 112 m (367 ft)
- Time zone: UTC+01:00 (CET)
  - Summer (DST): UTC+02:00 (CEST)

Strinda is a neighborhood in the city of Trondheim in Trøndelag county, Norway. The neighborhood is located in the Lerkendal borough within Trondheim Municipality. It is the site of the historic Strinda Church. The neighborhood lies to the north of Moholt, south of Valentinlyst, and southeast of Singsaker and Elgeseter.
