= Bratsberg =

Bratsberg is a name of Norwegian origin and may refer to:

== People ==
- Harry Bratsberg (also Harry Bratsburg), an American actor and director also known as Harry Morgan

== Places ==
- Bratsberg, Trøndelag, a village in Trondheim municipality in Trøndelag county, Norway
- Bratsberg amt, the former name for the Norwegian county now known as Telemark
- Bratsberg, Minnesota, a community in the state of Minnesota in the United States

== Newspapers ==
- Bratsberg-Demokraten, Norwegian newspaper published from 1908 to 1929
- Bratsberg Amtstidende, Norwegian newspaper published from 1830 to 1901
- Bratsberg Blad, a newspaper later called Breviks Dagblad

== Other ==
- Bratsberg Hydroelectric Power Station, hydroelectric power station located in Trondheim in Sør-Trøndelag, Norway
- Bratsberg Line, railway line between Eidanger and Notodden in Telemark, Norway
- Bratsberg Church, a church in Trondheim in Trøndelag county, Norway
