= Tyholt =

Neighborhood in Trondheim Municipality, Norway

- Neighborhood in Trondheim
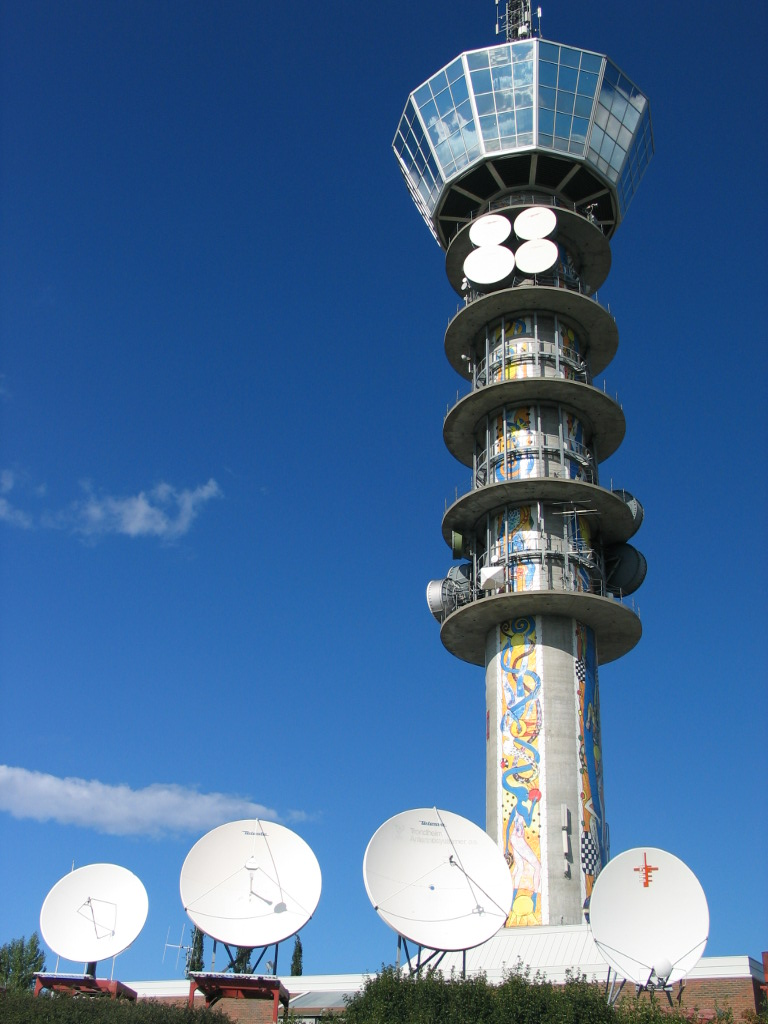
- View of the Tyholt Tower
- Interactive map of Tyholt
- Coordinates: 63.4246°N 10.4375°E
- Country: Norway
- Region: Central Norway
- County: Trøndelag
- Municipality: Trondheim Municipality
- Borough: Lerkendal
- Elevation: 101 m (331 ft)
- Time zone: UTC+01:00 (CET)
  - Summer (DST): UTC+02:00 (CEST)

Tyholt is a neighbourhood in Trondheim Municipality in Trøndelag county, Norway. It is located in the borough of Lerkendal at the highest point in the city of Trondheim. Before 1964, Tyholt was part of the old Strinda Municipality. It borders the neighborhoods Singsaker to the west, Strindheim to the north, Moholt to the south and Valentinlyst to the east. Most of Tyholt is residential. The area has a good view of Trondheim's city centre and the neighborhoods of Lade and Strinda.

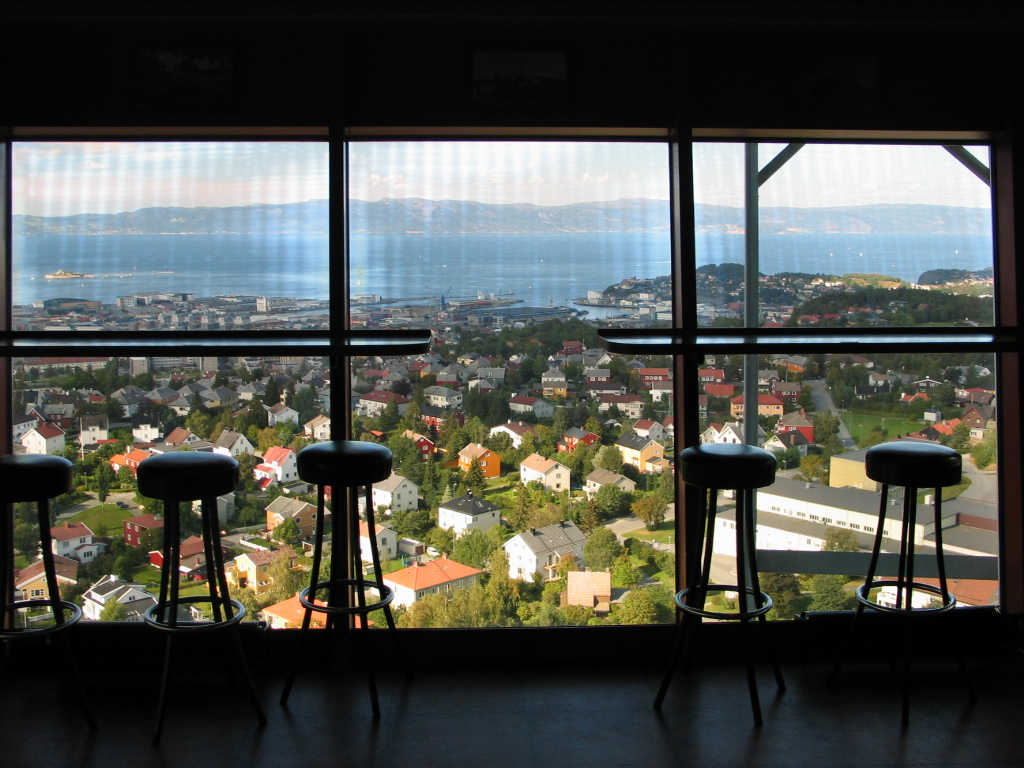
Tyholt viewed from Tyholt Tower

Tyholt Tower (Tyholttårnet) is a 124-metre (407 ft) tall communications tower which opened in 1985. The Centre for Marine Technology of the Norwegian University of Science and Technology and Centres of Excellence Centre for Ships and Ocean Structures (CeSOS) and AMOS (Centre for Autonomous Marine Operations and Systems) are hosted at facilities close to the tower. Still in close proximity is MARINTEK, hosting the only major test tank for maritime technology in Scandinavia. Located in Tyholt are the Trondheim offices of Telenor and the Norwegian Broadcasting Corporation. The latter hosts the radio channels NRK P1 and NRK P3.
