= Østbyen =

Bydel Østbyen
- Borough
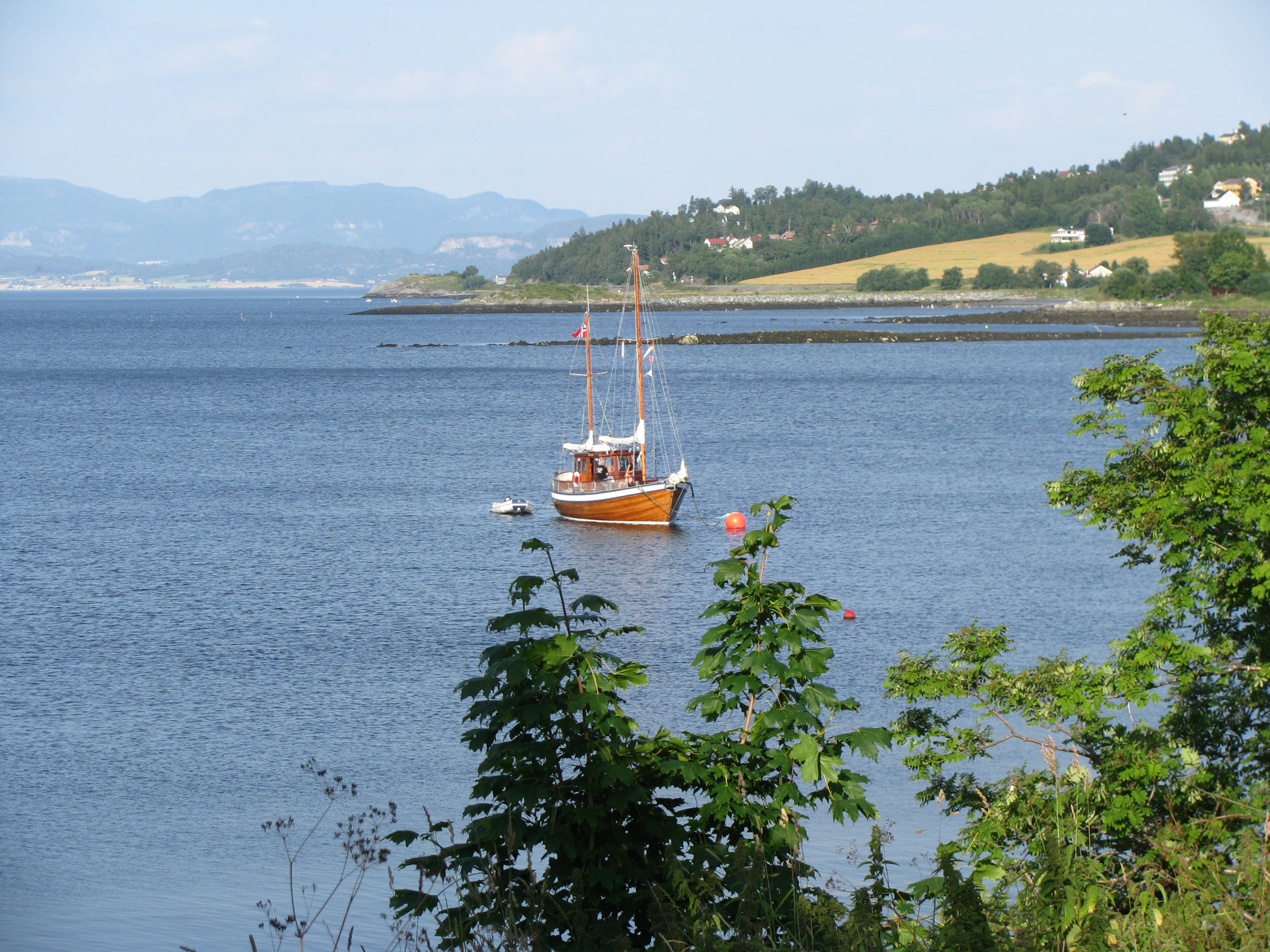
- Summer landscape east of Hansbakkfjæra, Ranheim. Much of Østbyen borders the Trondheimsfjord

- Coat of arms
- Interactive map of Bydel Østbyen
- Coordinates: 63°25′N 10°27′E
- Country: Norway
- Region: Central Norway
- County: Trøndelag
- Municipality: Trondheim Municipality
- City: Trondheim
- Time zone: UTC+01:00 (CET)
  - Summer (DST): UTC+02:00 (CEST)
- Post Code: 7041 Trondheim

Østbyen is a borough of the city of Trondheim in Trondheim Municipality in Trøndelag county, Norway. The borough was established on 1 January 2005 in a municipal borough reform that reduced the number of boroughs in the city. The borough of Lerkendal lies to the southwest, the borough of Midtbyen lies to the northwest, and Malvik Municipality lies to the east. The Trondheimsfjorden lies to the north. The borough consists of the areas of Møllenberg, Nedre Elvehavn, Rosenborg, Lade, Strindheim, Brundalen, Charlottenlund, Jakobsli, Ranheim and Vikåsen. It has 39,171 residents.

== See also ==
- List of boroughs in Trondheim prior to 2005
