= Estenstadmarka =

Park area in Trondheim, Norway

Coordinates: 63°23′N 10°28′E

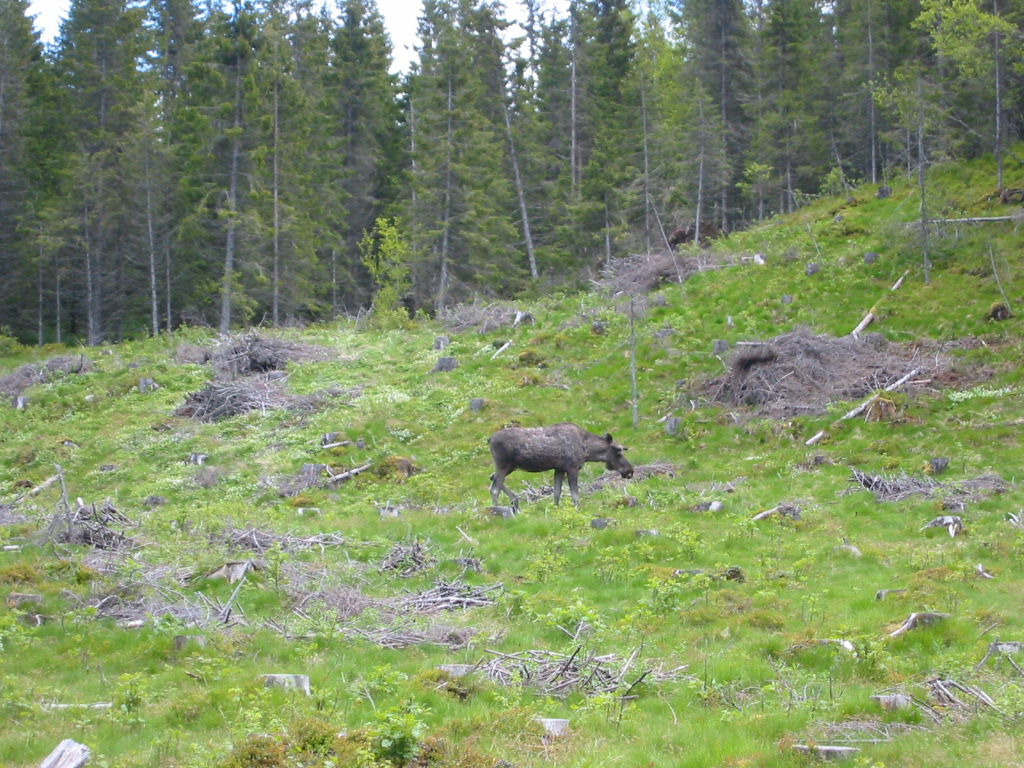
Moose in Estenstadmarka

Estenstadmarka is a hilly, forested area east-southeast of the city center of Trondheim in Trøndelag county, Norway. It is mainly used for recreation by the population of Trondheim. There are several gravel tracks, and electrically lit tracks for cross country skiing in the winter season. There are also several lakes, and a cabin (Estenstadhytta, 329 m.a.s.l.). There is a fine view over the city and fjord below from the Månen viewpoint.

Estenstadmarka is bounded by the lake Jonsvannet in the east.

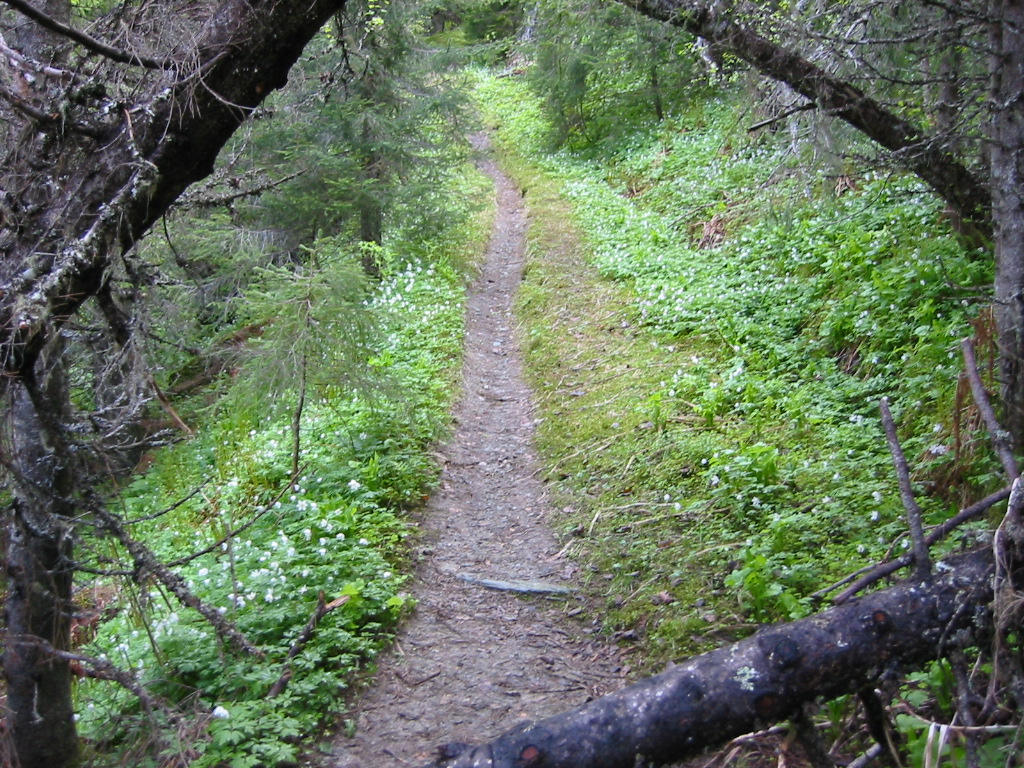
In Estenstadmarka

The NTNU campus at Dragvoll is located near Estenstadmarka.
