= Under Dusken =

Norwegian student newspaper

- "Organ for studenter"
- Type: free student newspaper
- School: NTNU
- Owner: Mediastud
- Founded: 1914; 112 years ago
- Headquarters: Elgesetergt. 1; 7030 Trondheim, Norway
- Country: Norway
- Circulation: 10,000
- Website: underdusken.no

Under Dusken is the official student newspaper in Trondheim, Norway, with a circulation of 10,000 copies. Founded in 1914, it is Scandinavia's oldest student newspaper, and the second largest student newspaper in Norway after Oslo's Universitas.

About 60 students work pro bono to produce a new edition of Under Dusken every third week.

The newspaper is jointly owned by Studentersamfundet i Trondhjem and Studentsamskipnaden i Trondheim through the media holding company Mediastud, which also is the publisher of Studentradioen i Trondheim (Norway's first student radio) and Student-TV (Scandinavia's oldest student television station).

The editor in chief is elected annually by the board of Mediastud. However, continuity has been ensured by electing candidates nominated by the editorial board of the newspaper.

On 23 August 2024, Under Dusken released its own app. The application acts as an extension of the website underdusken.no. Another effort to widen its publicity was made in 2025, when Under Dusken elected to recruit a full-time admin for its social media pages.

== Software development ==
Under Dusken has since the mid 90s developed many of its own utilities. The computer department in Under Dusken has developed two content management systems, Aranea and Pegadi.

=== Pegadi ===
Pegadi is written in Java and development was started in the beginning of 1999. The system works like a word processor with note field and gives the editors the ability to see how much has been written on each article.

=== Aranea ===
Aranea is written in Java and uses technologies like JPA, Spring og Velocity. This is the CMS that serves the newspaper's website underdusken.no.
