= Odd Magnus Faltinsen =

Norwegian professor

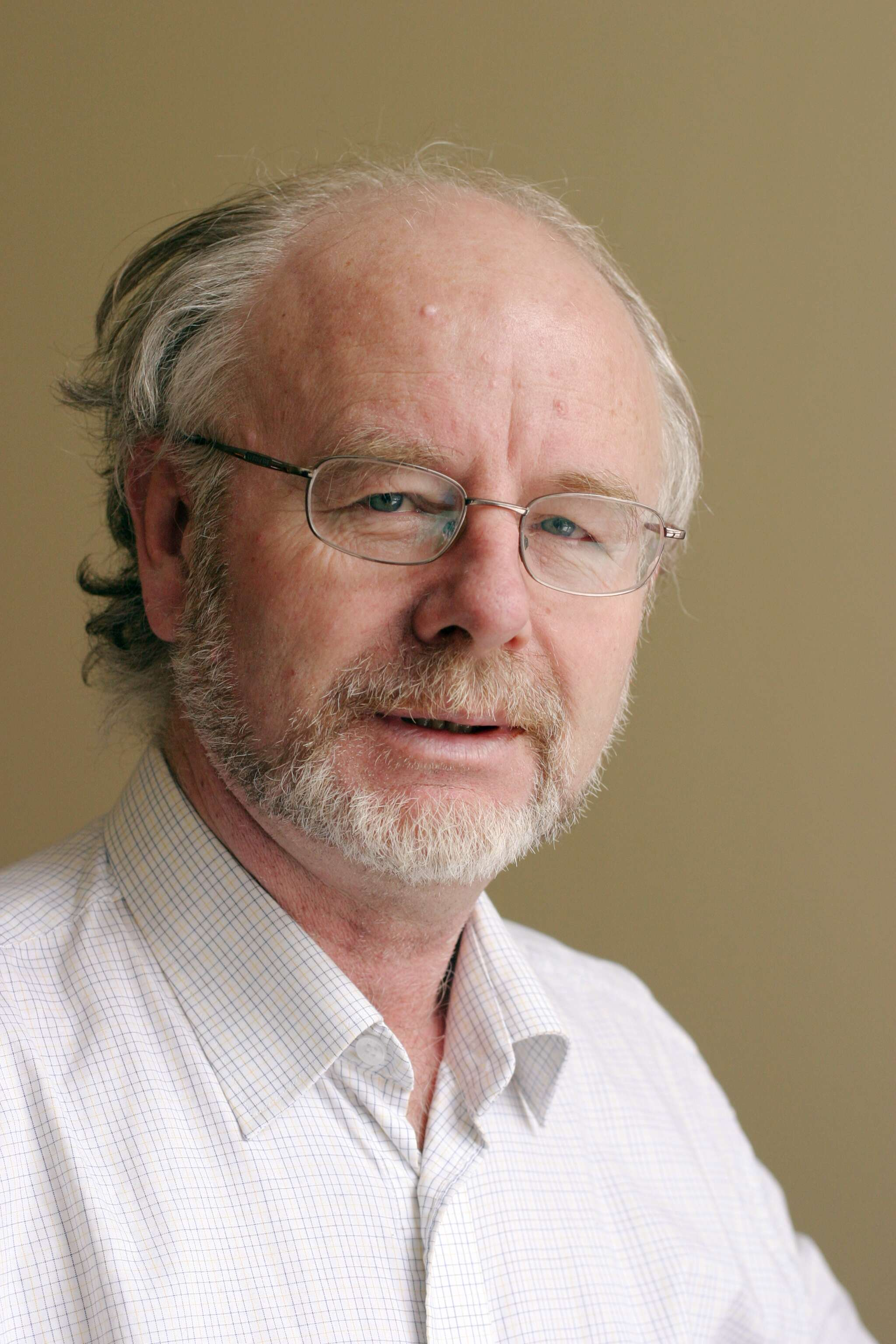
- Born: January 9, 1944 (age 82); Stavanger
- Education: University of Michigan
- Awards: Georg Weinblum Lectureship, 1992-1993
- Scientific career
- Fields: Marine hydrodynamics
- Workplaces: Norwegian University of Science and Technology

Odd Magnus Faltinsen (born 9 January 1944) is a Norwegian mathematician and professor of marine technology.

== Education and career ==
Faltinsen took the cand.real. degree at the University of Bergen in 1968, and the PhD degree at the University of Michigan in 1971. He started his career in Det Norske Veritas from 1968 to 1974, and was appointed docent in marine technology at the Norwegian Institute of Technology in 1974. In 1976 he was promoted to professor of marine hydrodynamics. He was a visiting professor at the Massachusetts Institute of Technology from 1980 to 1981,1987 to 1988 and 1994 to 1995. He is a member of the Norwegian Academy of Science and Letters, the Norwegian Academy of Technological Sciences, The Chinese Academy of Engineering and the National Academy of Engineering of the United States of America. Faltinsen received the Fridtjof Nansen award for outstanding research in science and medicine in 2011. He is now connected to the Centre for Ships and Ocean Structures at the Norwegian University of Science and Technology (the successor of the Norwegian Institute of Technology).

== Scientific contribution ==
Faltinsen is known for his work in hydrodynamics of high-speed vessels and liquid sloshing dynamics. He has written three textbooks on the subjects. The books are translated to Chinese. The book on sea loads are also translated to Korean. Faltinsen has developed theoretical and numerical methods for explaining how ships, high speed vehicles, and offshore structures behave in waves. The so-called STF - Salvesen-Tuck-Faltinsen method to estimate wave induced movements and loads on ships presented in 1970 is still used as an engineering tool to day. He has, together with Alexander Timokha, developed methods for analyzing how sloshing loads on to ships and they have analytically studied how large sloshing loads infer with constructions. He has also, together with e.g. Zhao, made extensive studies of slamming loads

== Books ==
- Faltinsen, O. M. (1990). Sea Loads on Ships and Offshore Structures. Cambridge, UK: Cambridge University Press. ISBN 0-521-45870-6.
- Faltinsen, O. M. (2006). Hydrodynamics of High-Speed Marine Vehicles. Cambridge University Press. ISBN 0-521-84568-8.
- Faltinsen, O. M. & Timokha, A. N. (2009). Sloshing. Cambridge University Press. ISBN 0-521-88111-0.
