= Mediastud =

Norwegian student media corporation

Mediastud is a Norwegian student media corporation founded in 1987.

Mediastud is the publisher of:

- Under Dusken, Scandinavia's oldest student newspaper (published since 1914)
- Radio Revolt, Norway's first student radio (broadcasting since 1984, name changed from Studentradion in 2008)
- Student-TV, Scandinavia's oldest student television station (broadcasting since 1991)

Mediastud is organized as a privately held company, jointly owned by Studentersamfundet i Trondhjem and Studentsamskipnaden i Trondheim.
