= Radio Revolt =

Coordinates: 63.4223°N 10.4000°E

- Singsakerbakken 2E 7030 Trondheim; Norway
- Broadcast area: 130 000
- Frequencies: 100 MHz, 106.2 MHz

Ownership
- Owner: Mediastud

History
- First air date: 2008 (1984)

Links
- Website: radiorevolt.no

Radio Revolt (formerly known as Studentradion i Trondheim), is the student radio in Trondheim, Norway. It airs 55 hours a week on 100 and 106,2 FM, and 24 hours a day on the internet. It employs about 80 students on a voluntary basis. The radio is a part of the Student Society in Trondheim, and is so a part of the running of the house.

== History ==
Radio Revolt was founded in 1984, as a local station for The Student Society. At that time the radio station featured a staff of eight persons. Since then, it has had an increasing growth during its (by 2010) 26 years of existence. The name Radio Revolt was decided in the autumn of 2008, preceding the 24/7 concession it started covering by the turn of 2009.
