= Rosenborg, Trondheim =

Neighborhood in the city of Trondheim, Norway

Rosenborg
- Neighborhood in Trondheim
- Interactive map of Rosenborg
- Coordinates: 63.4303°N 10.4205°E
- Country: Norway
- Region: Central Norway
- County: Trøndelag
- Municipality: Trondheim Municipality
- Borough: Østbyen
- Elevation: 47 m (154 ft)
- Time zone: UTC+01:00 (CET)
  - Summer (DST): UTC+02:00 (CEST)

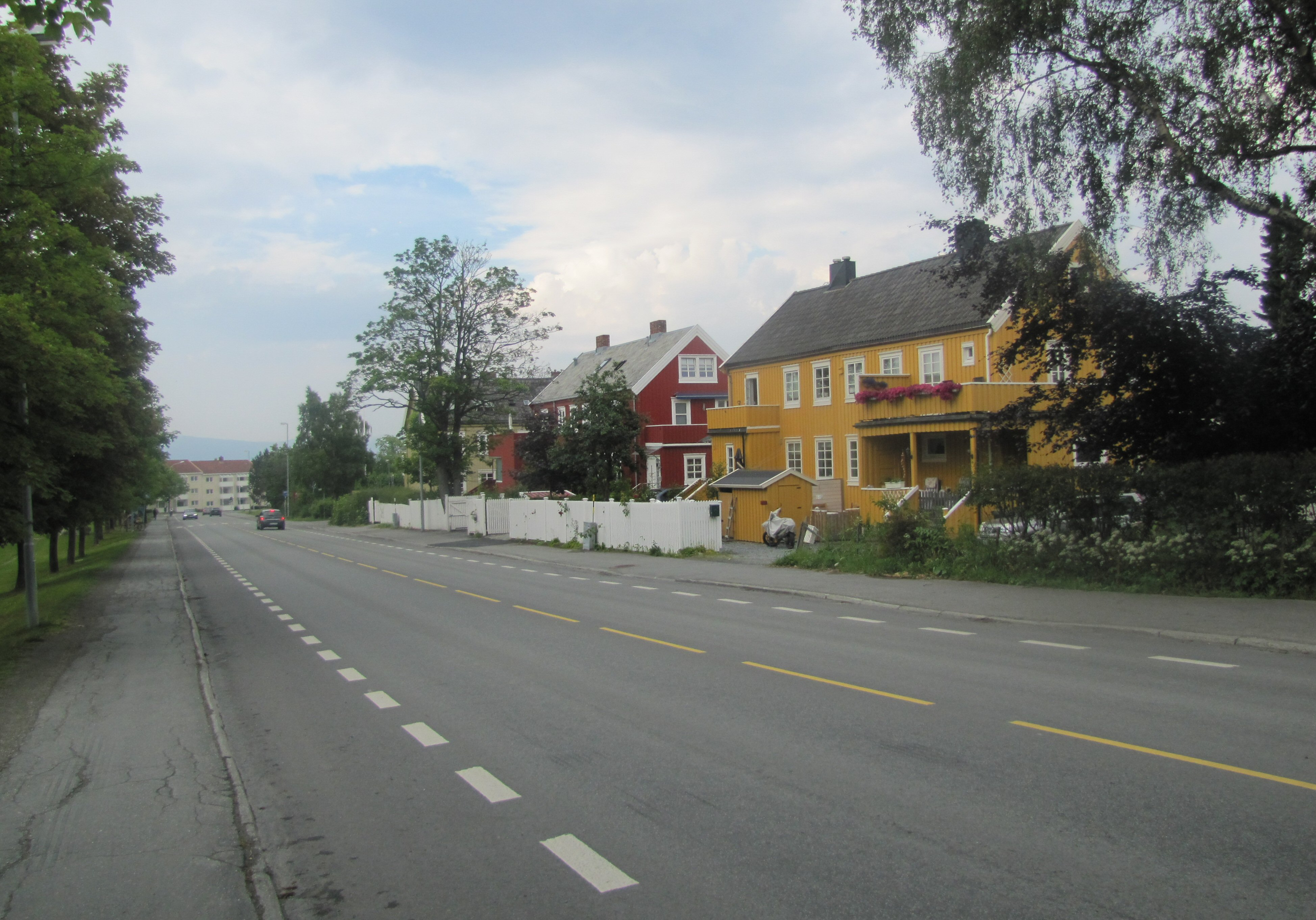
Festningsgata (FV865), Rosenborg, Trondheim

Rosenborg (Urban East Norwegian: [ˈrùːsn̩bɔrɡ]) is a neighbourhood in the city of Trondheim in Trøndelag county, Norway. It is located in the borough of Østbyen in Trondheim Municipality. It is located east of Møllenberg, south of Lademoen, north of Tyholt, and west of Persaunet. The eastern part of Rosenborg also borders to Kristiansten Fortress and the surrounding park. The area is mostly residential, both houses and apartments. There is also a large amateur football arena that among others hosts the women's team Trondheims-Ørn. The area also has given name to the Norwegian Premier League team Rosenborg Ballklub, that now is located at Lerkendal.

== See also ==
- Rosenvinge (noble family)
