= Fossegrenda =

- Neighborhood in Trondheim
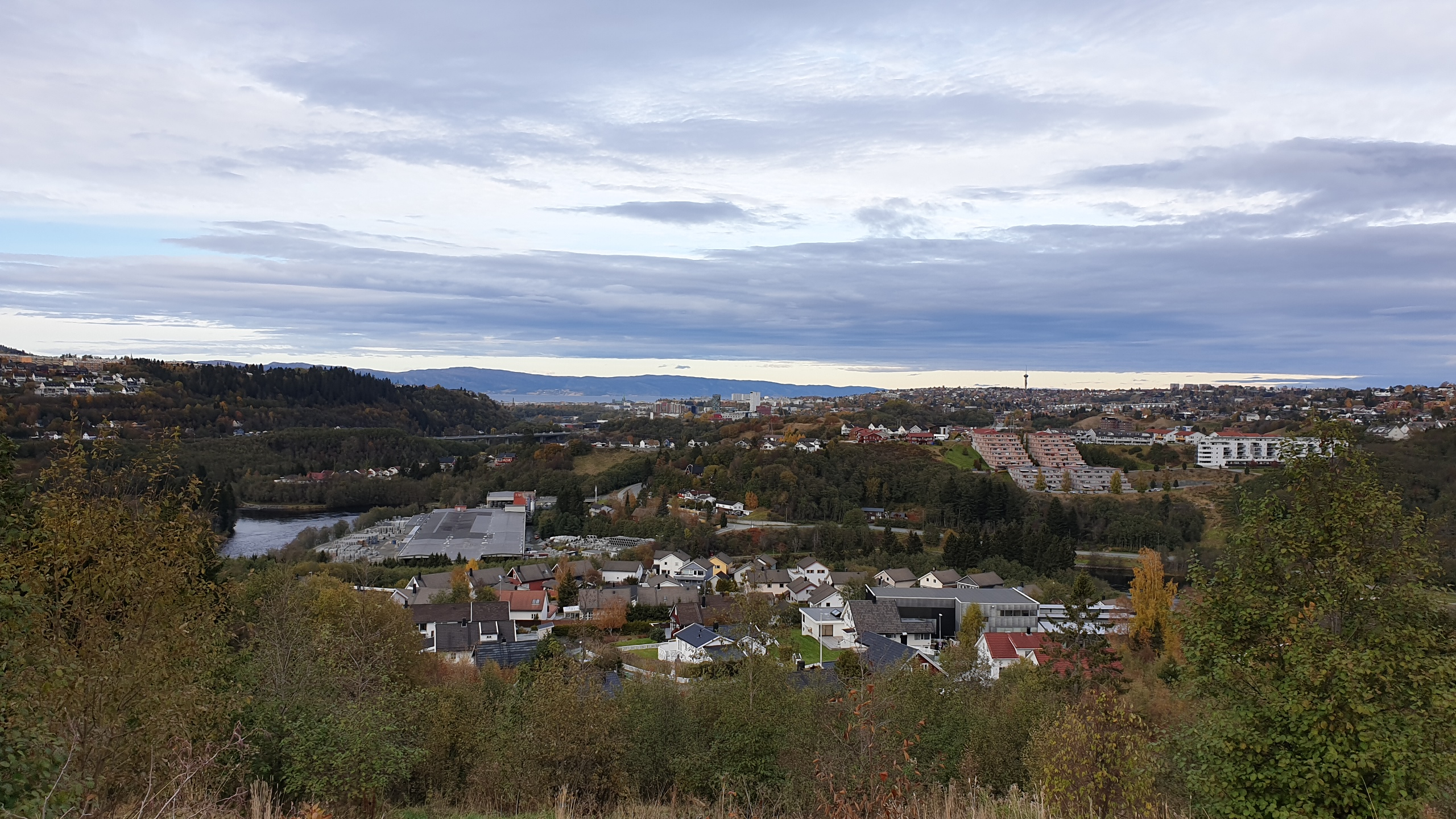
- View of the neighborhood

- Location of the neighborhood Fossegrenda (Norway)
- Coordinates: 63.2314°N 10.2481°E
- Country: Norway
- Region: Central Norway
- County: Trøndelag
- Municipality: Trondheim
- Borough: Lerkendal

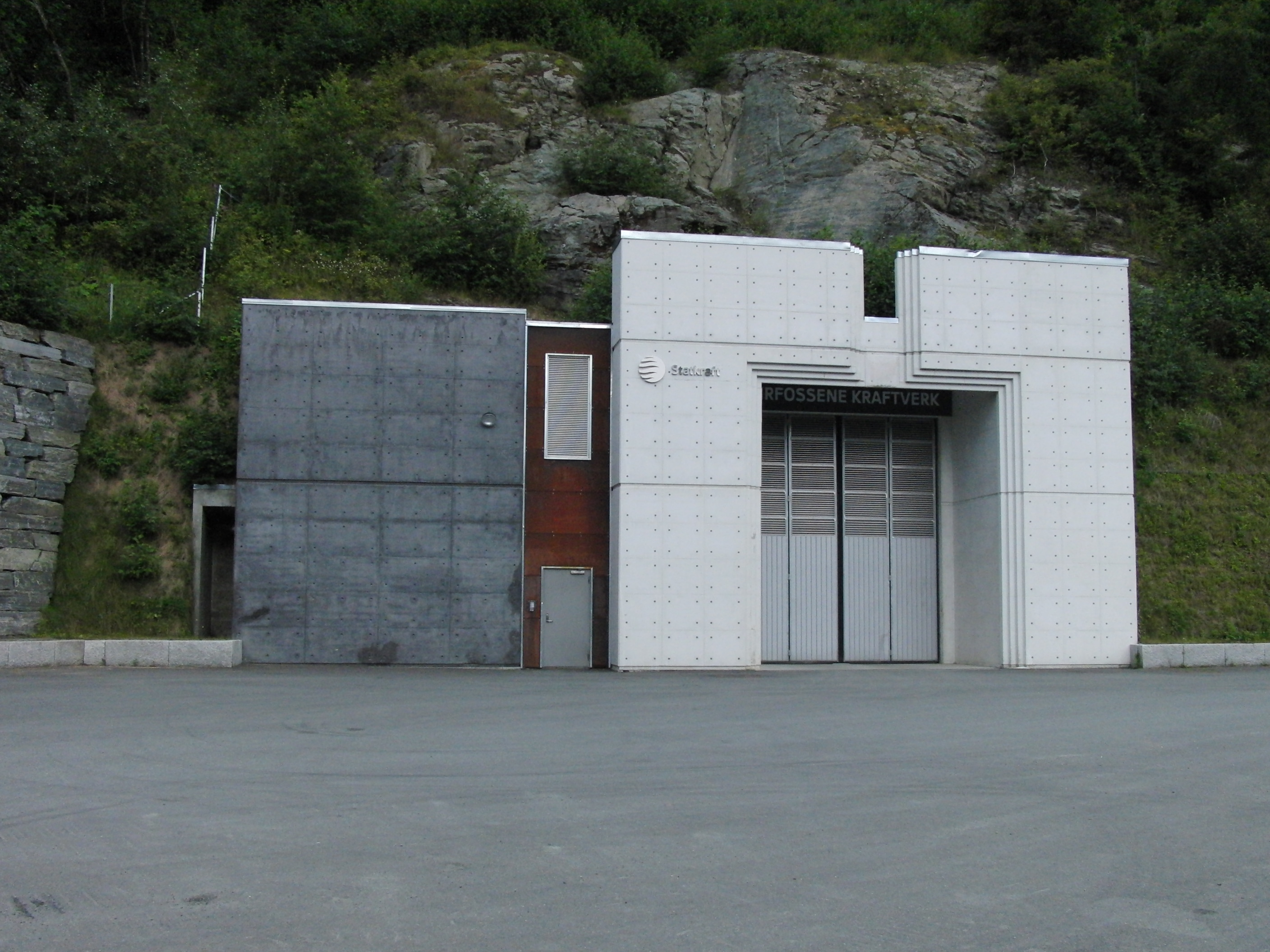

Fossegrenda is a neighborhood in the city of Trondheim in Trøndelag county, Norway. It is located about five km south of the city center. It is surrounded by the Nidelva River to the southwest, by the districts of Nidarvoll, Bratsbergveien to the northeast, and by the district of Leira to the southeast. Fossengrenda, in English "the waterfall hamlet", was named because of its proximity to the hydroelectric power station Leirfossene in the Nidelva.

The neighborhood developed as an industrial area from 1975, and remains today an important industrial and business center of the city of Trondheim. A geology laboratory is also conducting research at Fossengrenda.

Nevertheless, Fossegrenda remains a residential area with individual houses and several apartment blocks. 63% of the dwellings are individual houses. Fossegrenda is part of the district of Lerkendal.
