= Strindheim Church =

Church in Trøndelag, Norway

- Strindheim kirke
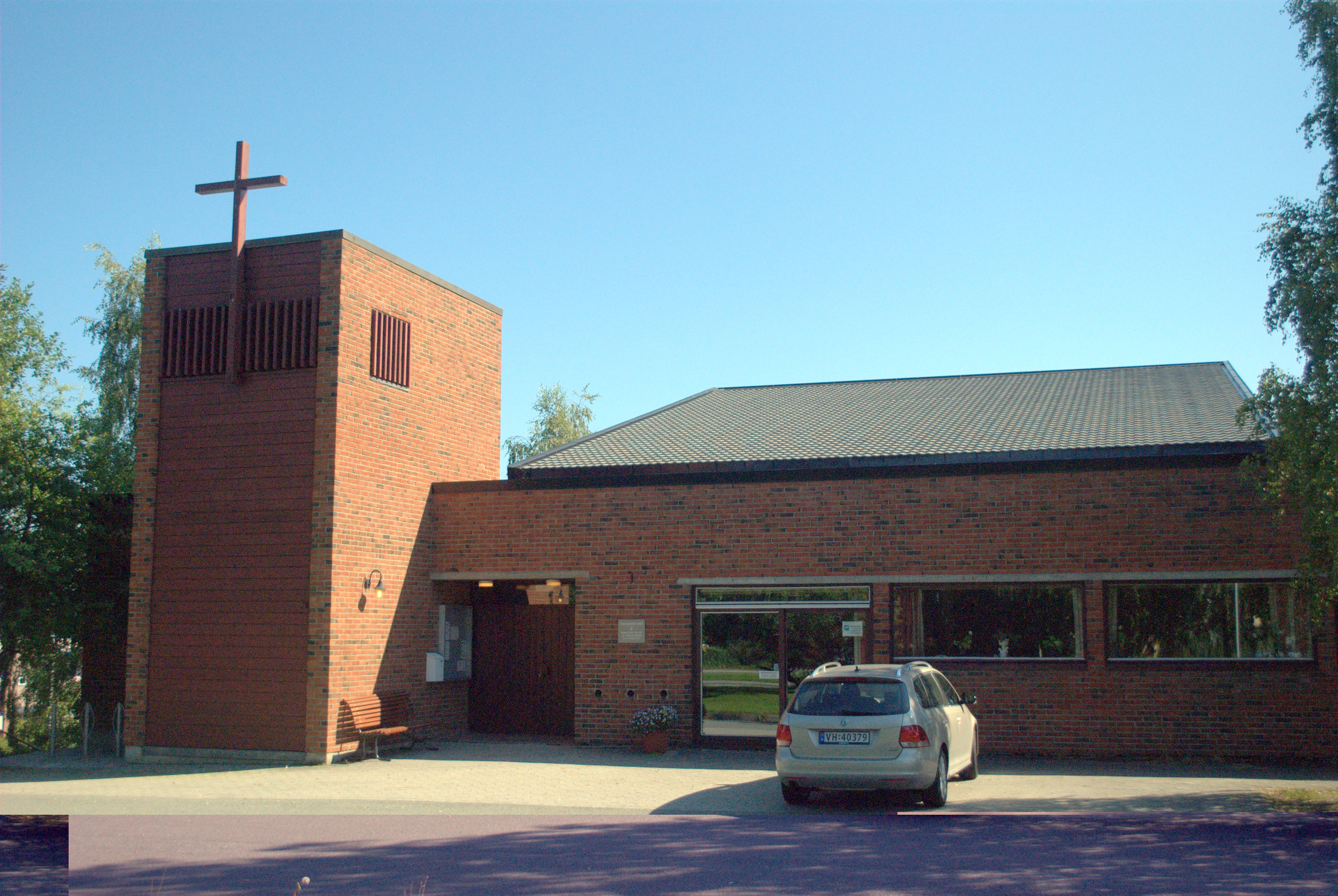
- View of the church
- Strindheim Church
- 63.4254556925°N 10.442486107°E
- Location: Trondheim Municipality, Trøndelag
- Country: Norway
- Denomination: Church of Norway
- Churchmanship: Evangelical Lutheran

History
- Former name: Bromstad kirke
- Status: Parish church
- Founded: 1979
- Consecrated: 1 April 1979

Architecture
- Functional status: Active
- Architect: Elisabeth Fidjestøl
- Architectural type: Rectangular
- Style: Modern
- Completed: 1979 (47 years ago)

Specifications
- Capacity: 240
- Materials: Brick

Administration
- Diocese: Nidaros bispedømme
- Deanery: Strinda prosti
- Parish: Strindheim
- Norwegian Cultural Heritage Site
- Type: Church
- Status: Not protected
- ID: 84981

Strindheim Church (Norwegian: Strindheim kirke, historically: Bromstad kirke) is a parish church of the Church of Norway in Trondheim Municipality in Trøndelag county, Norway. It is located in the Strindheim area in the city of Trondheim. It is the church for the Strindheim parish which is part of the Strinda prosti (deanery) in the Diocese of Nidaros. The modern, red, brick church was built in a rectangular style in 1979 using plans drawn up by the architect Elisabeth Fidjestøl. The church seats about 240 people.

== History ==
The new parish of Strindheim was established in 1961 when it was separated from the Strinda Church parish. The congregation used temporary facilities until 1979 when they completed their own church. The building was consecrated on 1 April 1979. The red brick building contains a sanctuary plus other offices and meeting rooms.

== See also ==
- List of churches in Nidaros
