= Dragvoll =

Neighborhood in the city of Trondheim, Norway

Dragvoll Dragvold
- Neighborhood in Trondheim
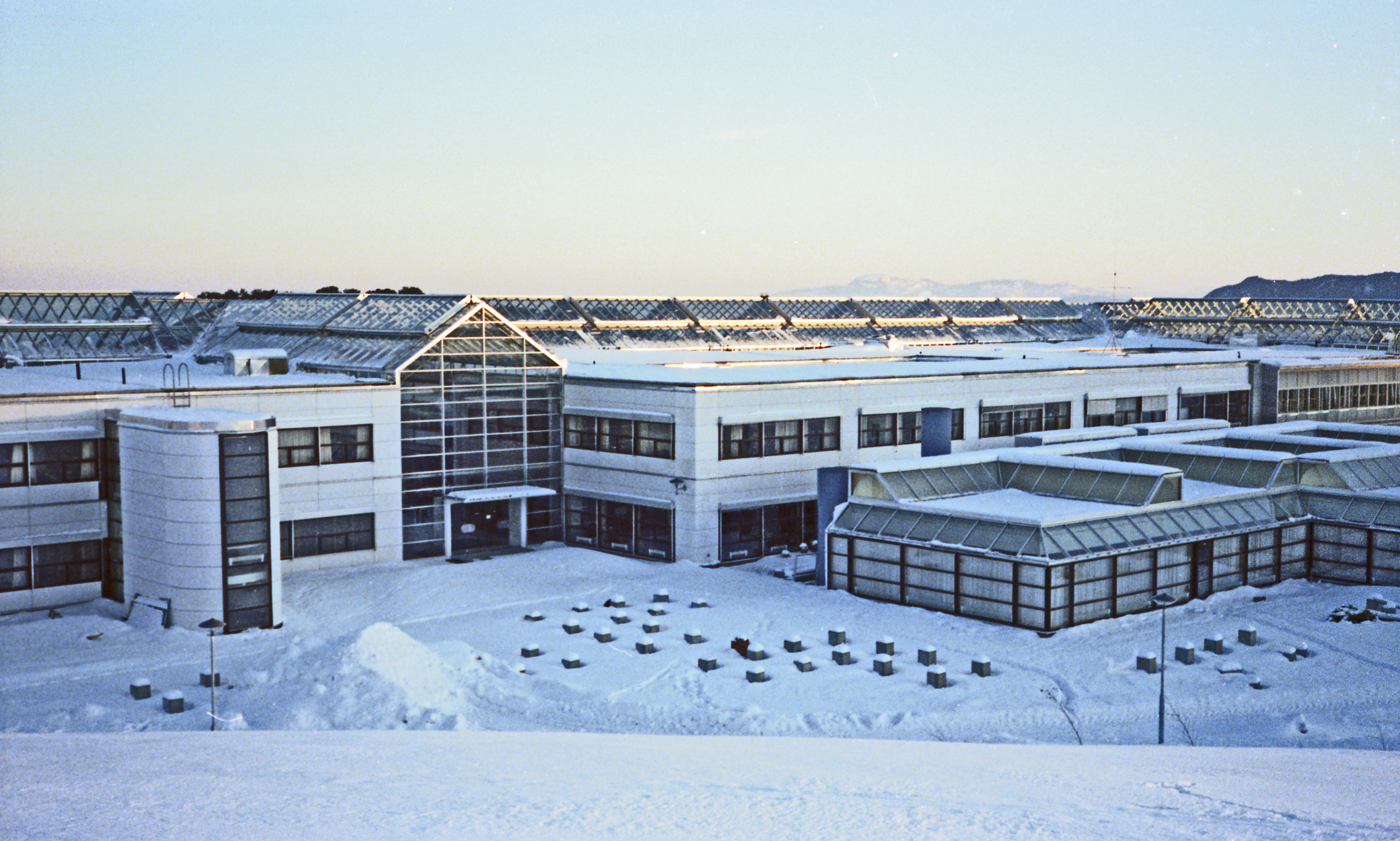
- View of the university campus in Dragvoll
- Interactive map of Dragvoll
- Coordinates: 63.4082°N 10.4701°E
- Country: Norway
- Region: Central Norway
- County: Trøndelag
- Municipality: Trondheim Municipality
- Borough: Lerkendal
- Elevation: 160 m (520 ft)
- Time zone: UTC+01:00 (CET)
  - Summer (DST): UTC+02:00 (CEST)

Dragvoll is a neighborhood in the city of Trondheim in Trøndelag county, Norway. The neighborhood is located in the borough of Lerkendal in Trondheim Municipality. The area hosts the campus for the faculties of social sciences and humanities of the Norwegian University of Science and Technology (NTNU). Until the 1996 creation of NTNU, it was the social sciences and humanities campus of the Norwegian College of General Sciences.

== History ==
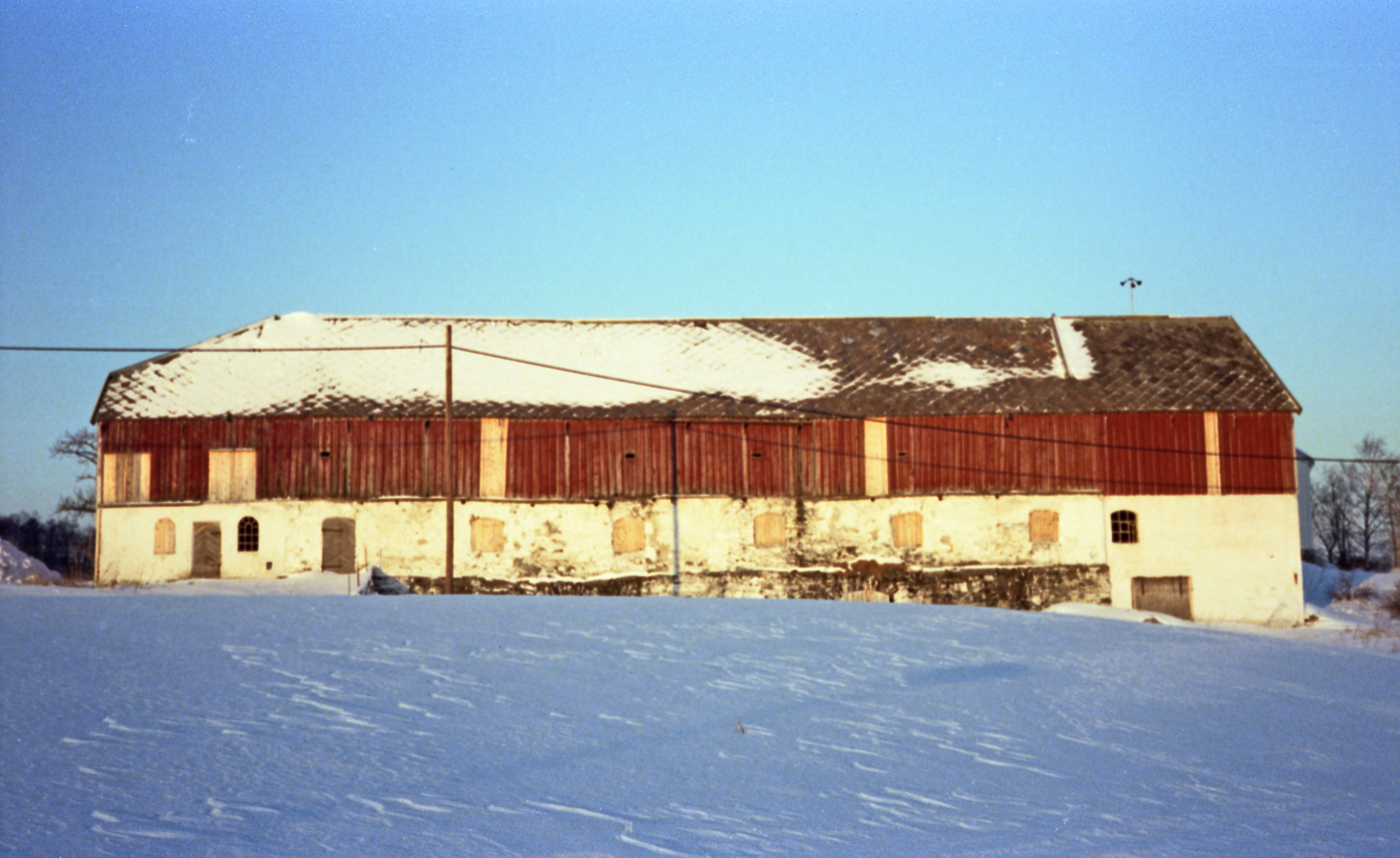
The barn which burned down in 1981

=== Farm ===
The site was traditionally a farm. The historic name of Dragvoll has varied, variously being written Draghaull (1519), Dragouldt (1570), Drauold (1621), Dragwoll (1667) and Dragvoll (1723). The first part is derived from the site being located on a creek, Stokkbekken, with the latter being a voll. The earliest records of the farm have it registered with the king owning half and the pastor of Our Lady's Church with the other half. The first known farmer was Joon Draguol and his wife, Ingeborg, in 1645. The farm was privatized between 1661 and 1683. Kaspar Widthagen's odelsrett was registered in 1683. By 1701 it had passed to Wilhelm Sebastian With, who owned but did not run the farm, as he was working as a pastor in Trondheim.

The farm continued to be owned by non-farmers. Melcher Brødicher bought the farm in 1727 and it was subsequently owned by Anche Bennickmand, Fredrich Fabich, Charles Omilus Lutzow, Reimer Ulfers, Morten Simonsen Hoff, who in 1774 sold it to Fredrik Christian von Krabbe, who two years later sold it to Johanna Nikolava Ulfers. She kept it until it was transferred to Reiner Ulfers. It then was transferred to M. Spechman in 1839, Engelbright Thun in 1850, Gustav Olsen in 1870, Jacob Høe in 1876 and Arnt Clemmetsen Grendahl in 1881. At the time of the last transaction most of the crofts had been split off and the farm retained 35 hectares (86 acres) of fields plus forest and meadows.

The ultimate farmhouse was built around 1800 as a trønderlån. It had received a renovation, with a new interior, but with a faithful reproduction of the exterior. The barn is traditionally dated to 1848, although this may not be accurate. Its foundation may date as far back as the Middle Ages. The stable dates from 1938. The farm was bought by the state for use for the university in 1964. In 1981 a group of youth broke into the barn and lit a bondfire. The fire spread to the building and it burned down. A week later the medieval foundations were demolished, in violation with their restriction as being preserved.

=== University ===
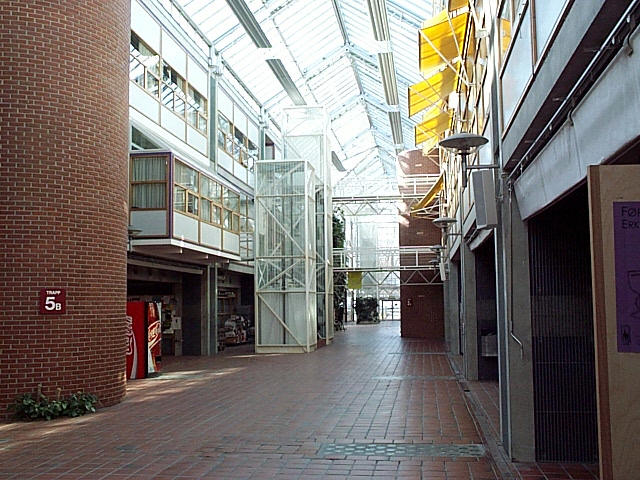
Internal view of the Dragvoll campus

During the 1960s Norway experienced a period with massive expansion in several areas, including higher education. One of these processes was the establishment of a university in Trondheim. The Ministry of Education and Research contacted the County Governor of Sør-Trøndelag to find a suitable site for a campus. The main concern at the time was to create room for future freedom of expansion. The Norwegian Institute of Technology was at the time the largest educational institution in Trondheim and was estimating that it would need a further 100 hectares (250 acres) of space to expand at Gløshaugen in the following decade.

Four main criteria were used to determine the location: a best possible location in relation, especially related to natural surroundings, sufficient land for future expansion, flexible land for campus design, and sufficient land for auxiliary installations, such as parks, sports venues, student housing etcetera. Dragvoll met these criteria. It also allowed the endowed land to be used for agriculture until it was needed for future expansions. The plans and approval of a university were passed by the Parliament of Norway in 1968.
