= Valentinlyst =

Neighborhood in the city of Trondheim, Norway

- Neighborhood in Trondheim
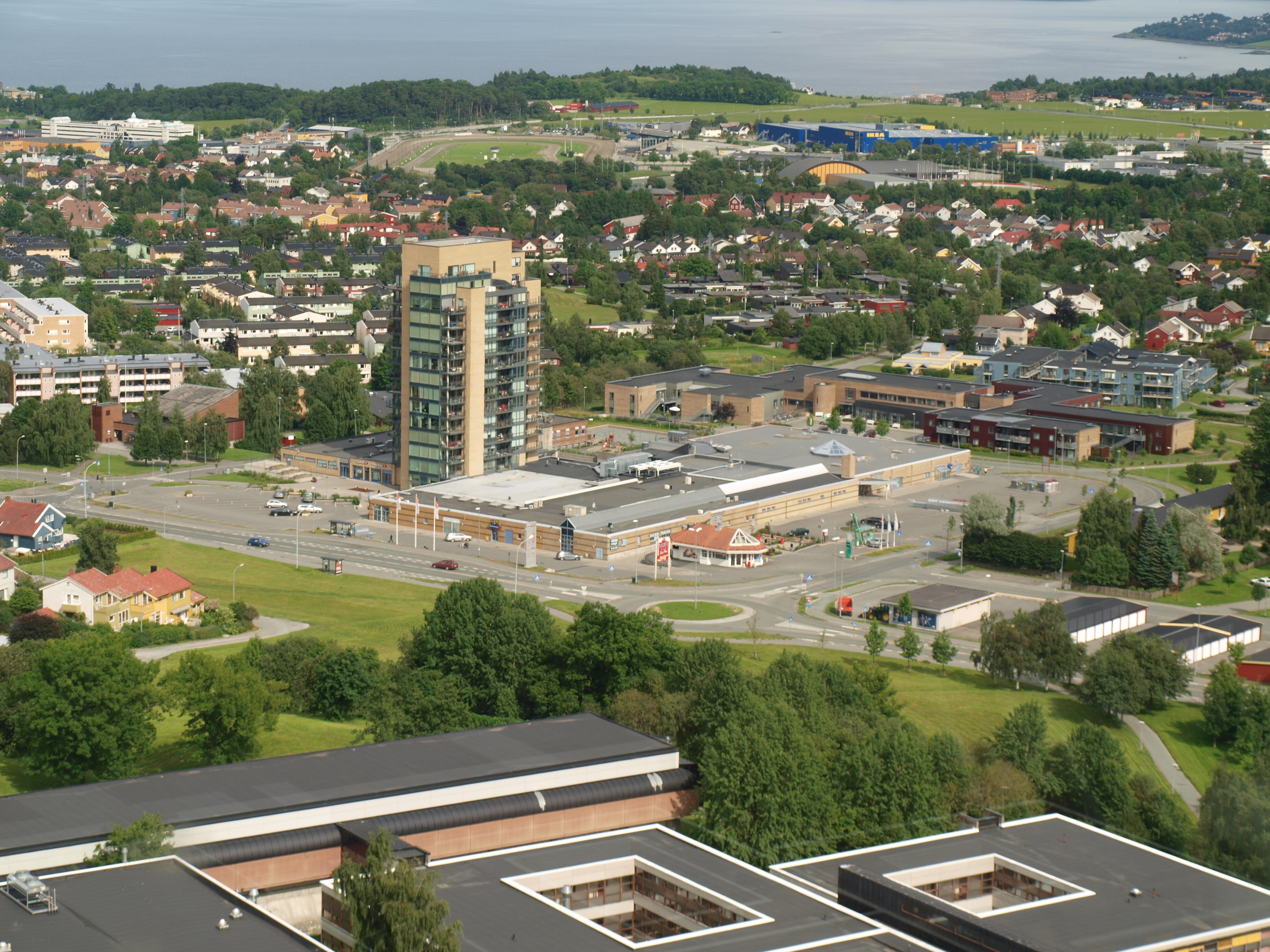
- View of the neighborhood mall
- Interactive map of Valentinlyst
- Coordinates: 63.4226°N 10.4417°E
- Country: Norway
- Region: Central Norway
- County: Trøndelag
- Municipality: Trondheim Municipality
- Borough: Lerkendal
- Elevation: 87 m (285 ft)
- Time zone: UTC+01:00 (CET)
  - Summer (DST): UTC+02:00 (CEST)

Valentinlyst is a neighborhood in the city of Trondheim in Trøndelag county, Norway. It is located in the borough of Lerkendal in Trondheim Municipality. It is south of the neighborhood of Persaunet, north of Moholt, west of Tunga, and east of Tyholt.
