= Rosenvinge (noble family) =

Danish and Norwegian noble family

- Nobility
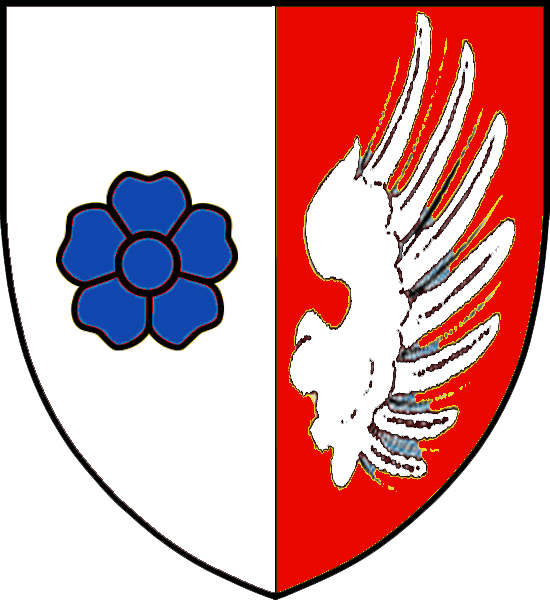
- Coat of arms of the Rosenvinge family
- Country: Denmark; Norway
- Founded: 31 May 1505 (ennoblement)
- Founder: Mogens Jensen
- Titles: Overlord of Bergenhus; Mayor of Helsingør; Mayor of Odense; Mayor of Bergen
- Cadet branches: Kolderup-Rosenvinge

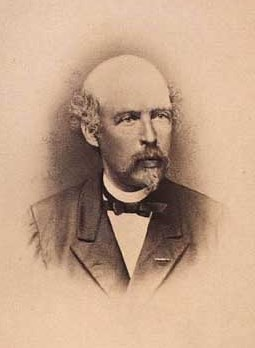
Valdemar Kolderup-Rosenvinge (1828-1889) Photographer: Hansen & Weller

The Rosenvinge family (lit. 'Rose Wing') is a Danish and Norwegian noble family.

== Origin ==
=== Rosenvinge in Denmark ===
The family's progenitor, Mogens Jensen (d. 1528), who was the secretary of Prince Christian (1481–1559), later overlord in Bergenhus and Mayor of Helsingør, was ennobled on 31 May 1505. He married Anna Pedersdatter, who was the daughter of Peder Hansen, Mayor of Helsingør, who himself had been ennobled in 1476 by King Christian I of Denmark.

Mogens Jensen was the father of Henrik Mogensen Rosenvinge (d. 1553). His patrilineal grandson Mogens Henriksen Rosenvinge (1540–1607) was Mayor of Odense. Mogens Henriksen's sons Jørgen Mogensen Rosenvinge (1570–1634), Mayor of Odense, and Jens Mogensen Rosenvinge, City Manager of Odense, became the progenitors of, respectively, the Norwegian branch and the Danish branch of the family. From the family descends also the Kolderup-Rosenvinge noble family.

=== Rosenvinge in Norway ===
Jørgen Mogensen Rosenvinge (1570–1634) was the patrilineal great-grandfather of Peder Kaasbøl Rosenvinge (1701–1766), parish priest at Selbu, and Eiler Schøller Rosenvinge (1703–1776), parish priest at Frosta.

Peder Kaasbøl Rosenvinge was the father of Jacob Christian Rosenvinge (1737–1812), priest at Ytterøy Church, and Eiler Hagerup Rosenvinge (1742–1805), Mayor of Bergen. His daughter Susanne Kaasbøl Rosenvinge (1738–1771) married Jesper Andreas Kolderup, and their son, General Director of the Post Peter Andreas Rosenvinge Kolderup (1761–1824) was ennobled in 1811 under the name Kolderup-Rosenvinge.

Eiler Schøller Rosenvinge was the father of Eiler Schøller Rosenvinge (1758–1818), major in Fredrikstad, Johannes Gunnerus Rosenvinge (1759–1833), ‘overvraker ’in Trondheim, Johannes Gunnerus Rosenvinge (1759–1833), rittmeister, Jørgen Coldevin Rosenvinge (1764–1842), major and proprietarian at Rosenborg by Trondheim, and Isach Georg Rosenvinge (1767–1840), rittmeister and proprietarian at Egge by Steinkjer. Eiler Schøller Rosenvinge the younger had several illegitimate children with three different wives. The children adopted the name Rosenvinge. Jørgen Coldevin Rosenvinge was the father of Johannes Rosenvinge (1804–1727), painter, and Abraham Bredahl Rosenvinge (1810–1884), meteorologist and proprietarian at Rosenborg.

== See also ==
- Danish nobility
- Norwegian nobility
- Rosenborg, Trondheim

== Other sources ==
- Christiansen, Per R.: Frostaboka Vol 3. Frosta historielag, 1989.
- Grandjean, Poul Bredo: Rosenvinge in Christian Blangstrup (editor), Salmonsens Konversationsleksikon. Copenhagen, J.H. Schultz Forlag 1915–30.
- Moksnes, Leif: Frostaboka Vol 2. Frosta historielag, 1970.
- A. Thiset og P.L. Wittrup: Nyt dansk Adelslexikon, Copenhagen 1904
- Sven Tito Achen: Danske adelsvåbener, Copenhagen 1973
