= Voll =

Voll may refer to:

== Places ==
=== Norway ===
- Voll, Akershus, a village area in Bærum municipality in Akershus county
- Voll, Rauma, a village area in Rauma municipality in Møre og Romsdal county
- Voll, Rogaland, a village in Klepp municipality in Rogaland county
- Voll, Trøndelag, a village in Rennebu municipality in Trøndelag county
- Voll Church, a church in Rauma municipality in Møre og Romsdal county, Norway
- Voll Municipality, a former municipality in Møre og Romsdal county

== People with the surname ==
- Christoph Voll (1897-1939), German sculptor and graphic artist associated with Expressionism
- Daniel Voll, American journalist
- Jacqueline Voll (born 1987), Dutch figure skater
- John J. Voll (1922-1987), career officer in the United States Air Force and a World War II flying ace
- Toomas Voll (born 1958), Estonian composer, conductor and choir director

== Other uses ==
- VoLL, or Value of lost load
