= Singsaker =

Neighborhood in the city of Trondheim, Norway

- Neighbourhood in Trondheim
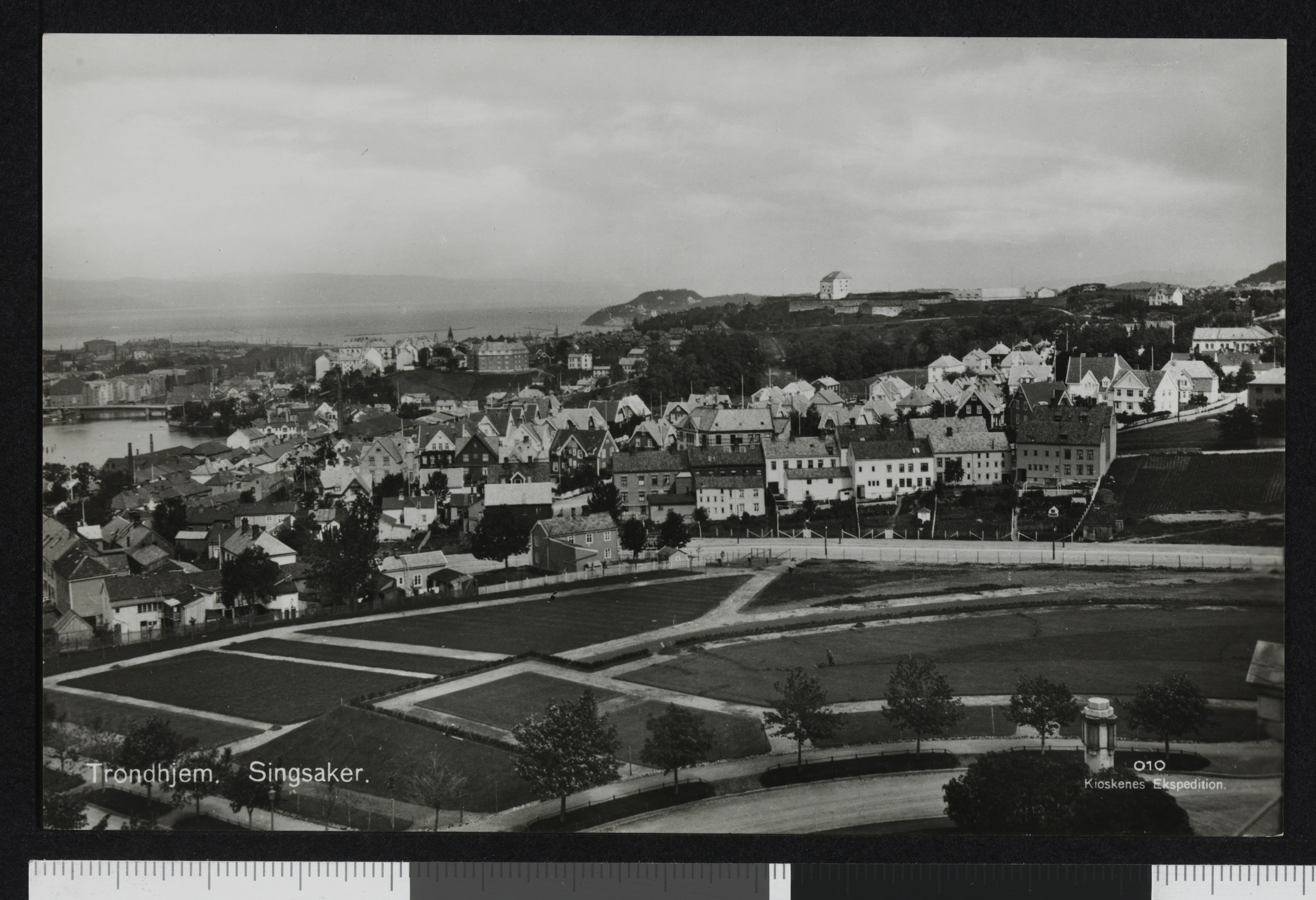
- View of the neighbourhood seen from Gløshaugen.
- Interactive map of Singsaker
- Coordinates: 63.4224°N 10.4126°E
- Country: Norway
- Region: Central Norway
- County: Trøndelag
- Municipality: Trondheim Municipality
- Borough: Midtbyen
- Elevation: 47 m (154 ft)
- Time zone: UTC+01:00 (CET)
  - Summer (DST): UTC+02:00 (CEST)

Singsaker is a neighbourhood in the city of Trondheim in Trøndelag county, Norway. It is located in the borough of Midtbyen in Trondheim Municipality. The neighborhood lies north of the neighborhood of Moholt, east of Gløshaugen, west of Tyholt and Rosenborg, and south of Bakklandet. The area consists almost completely of residential villa housing, despite being quite close to the city center of Trondheim.

The neighbourhood is regarded as one of the most affluent in the city, although its close proximity to the Norwegian University of Science and Technology makes it a popular place for student housing, including Singsaker Studenterhjem. Between 1927 and 1968, Singsakerlinjen tram line went from the city center to Singsaker, extending onward to Rosenborg.
