= Bratsberg Hydroelectric Power Station =

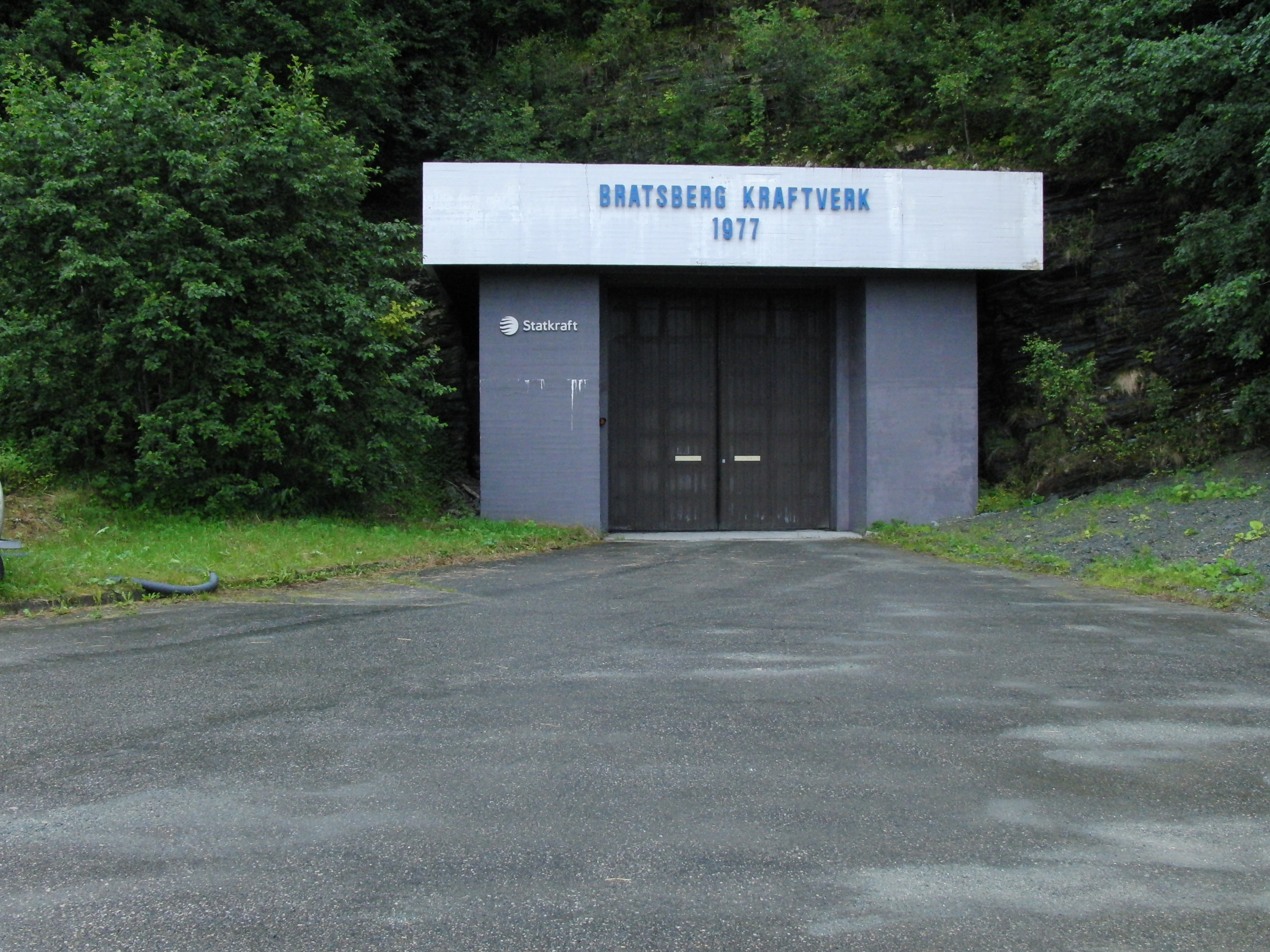

- Location within Norway
- Official name: Bratsberg kraftverk
- Country: Norway
- Location: Sør-Trøndelag County, Trondheim, Norway
- Coordinates: 63°22′23″N 10°24′27″E
- Status: Operational
- Owner: Statkraft

Reservoir
- Creates: Selbusjøen reservoir

Power Station
- Commission date: 1977
- Type: Conventional
- Hydraulic head: 147
- Turbines: 2 (Francis)
- Installed capacity: 124 MW
- Capacity factor: 59.8%
- Annual generation: 650 GWh

Bratsberg Power Station (Bratsberg kraftverk) is a hydroelectric power station located in Trondheim in Sør-Trøndelag County, Norway, owned by Statkraft. It operates at an installed capacity of 124 MW, with an average annual production of 650 GWh. The power plant is fed from the Selbusjøen reservoir, connected with a 12 km long tunnel, offering a gross head of 147 m. The power plant has two Francis turbines.
