= Stokkan =

Stokkan is a Norwegian surname. Notable people with the surname include:

- Arild Stokkan-Grande (born 1978), Norwegian politician
- Ketil Stokkan (born 1956), Norwegian pop artist
