= Bratsberg Church =

Church in Trøndelag, Norway

- Bratsberg kirke
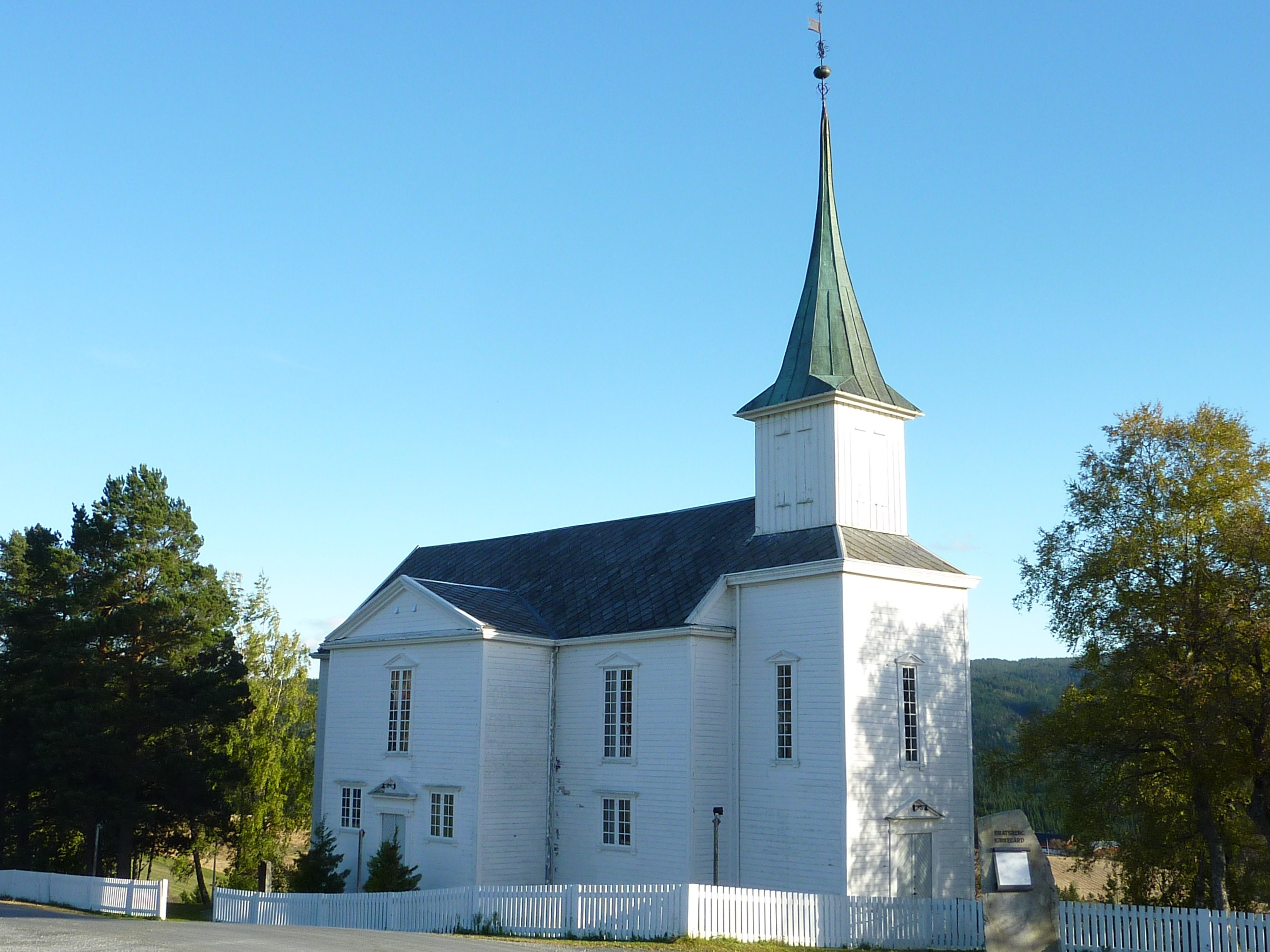
- View of the church
- Bratsberg Church
- 63.3475094445°N 10.481061637°E
- Location: Trondheim Municipality, Trøndelag
- Country: Norway
- Denomination: Church of Norway
- Churchmanship: Evangelical Lutheran

History
- Status: Parish church
- Founded: 14th century
- Consecrated: 4 Dec 1850

Architecture
- Functional status: Active
- Architect(s): Hans Linstow and Ole Henriksen
- Architectural type: Cruciform church
- Completed: 1850 (176 years ago)

Specifications
- Capacity: 220
- Materials: Wood

Administration
- Diocese: Nidaros bispedømme
- Deanery: Strinda prosti
- Parish: Nidelven
- Norwegian Cultural Heritage Site
- Type: Church
- Status: Automatically protected
- ID: 83942

Bratsberg Church (Norwegian: Bratsberg kirke) is a parish church of the Church of Norway in Trondheim Municipality in Trøndelag county, Norway. It is located in the Bratsberg area southeast of the city of Trondheim and east of Heimdal. It is one of the churches for the Nidelven parish which is part of the Strinda prosti (deanery) in the Diocese of Nidaros. The white, wooden church was built in a cruciform style in 1850 by Ole Henriksen using plans drawn up by the architect Hans Linstow. The church seats about 220 people.

== History ==
The earliest existing historical records of the church date back to the year 1663, but the church was founded much earlier. The first church in Bratsberg was a stave church that was located on the Bratsberg farm, about 1.5 kilometres (0.93 mi) west of the present church site. The old medieval church was torn down around the year 1663. In its place, a new church was constructed on the same site. The new church had a rather unique Y-shaped floor plan.

By 1845, the old church was in poor condition and it was decided to replace the old church. At the same time, the parish decided to move the church site about 1.5 kilometres (0.93 mi) east to a site that was more populated and easier for people in the parish to get to. The new church was built in 1850 by a team led by Ole Henriksen using designs that were drawn up by Hans Linstow. The church was consecrated on 4 December 1850 by Hans Jørgen Darre who was the Bishop of the Diocese of Nidaros. The new church had a cruciform design. The church underwent restoration during 1905, 1972, and 2016.

The original altarpiece was performed at that time by Eilert Balle Lund (1815–1891). The present altarpiece dates to 1972 and was completed by Knut Skinnarland (1909–1993). The baptismal font is in brass and dates from 1638. The organ was installed in 1913. The church has two bells dating from 1850 and 1989.

== See also ==
- List of churches in Nidaros

== Media gallery ==
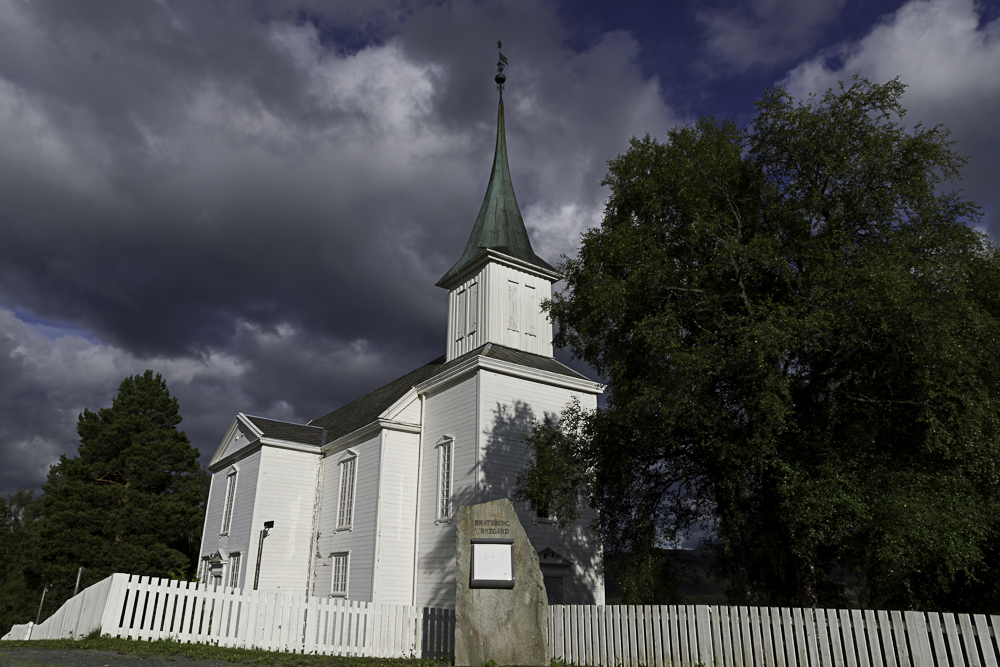

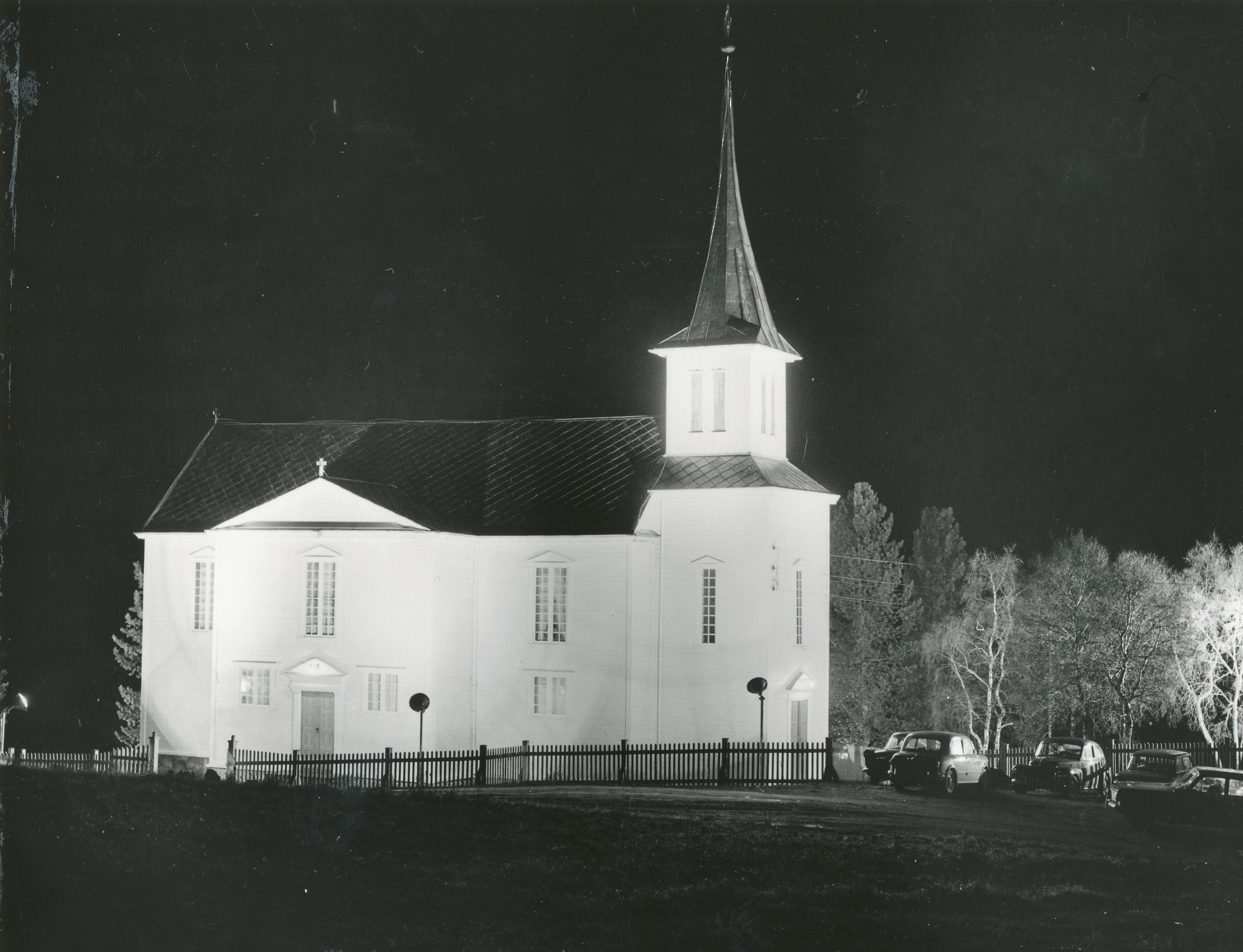

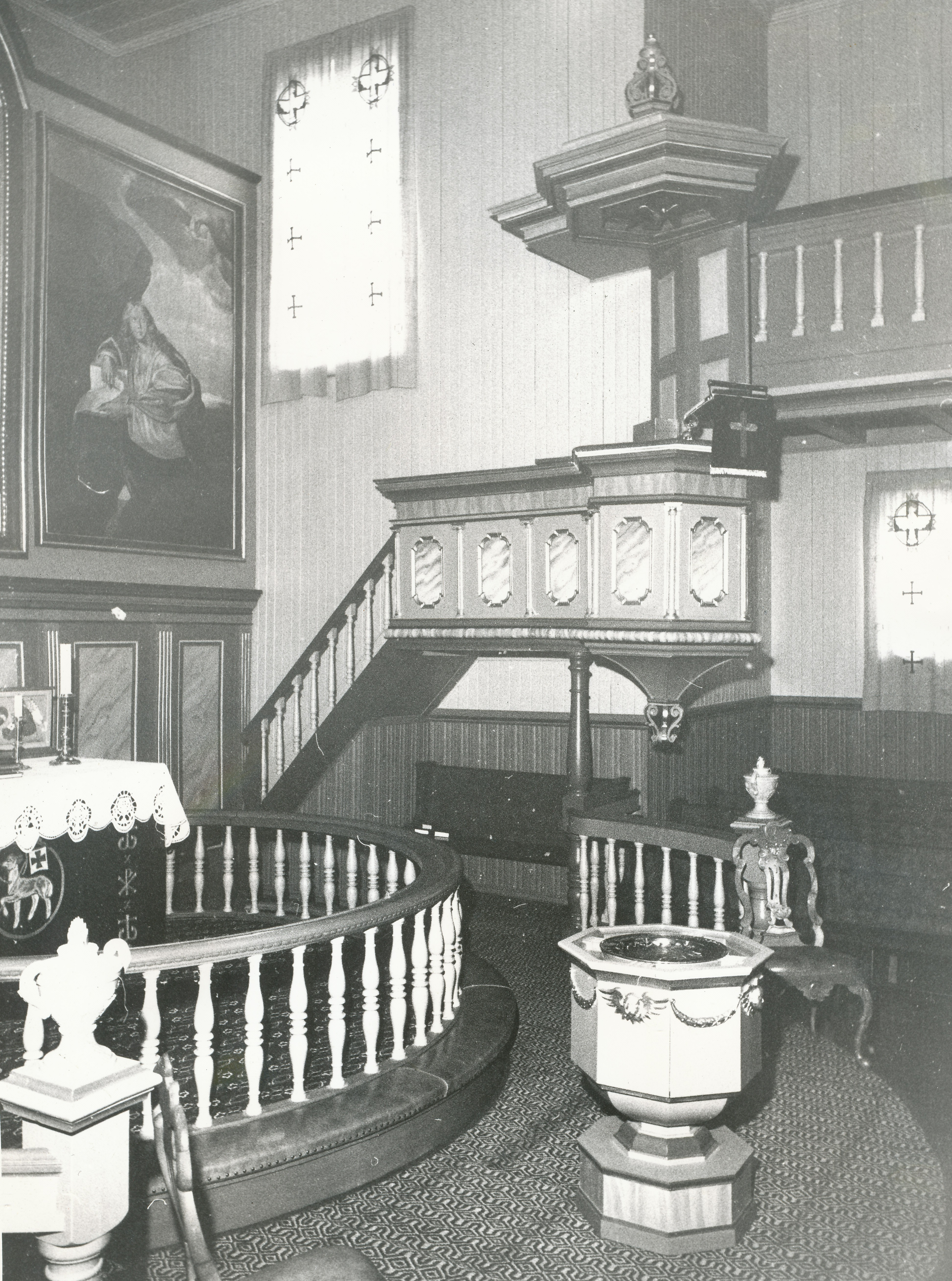
