= Centre for Ships and Ocean Structures =

The Centre for Ships and Ocean Structures (CeSOS) is a research centre located at the Marine Technology Centre in Trondheim, Norway. The research centre's goal is to create fundamental knowledge about the design and operation of ships and ocean structures. The centre has been active since 2002, when it was established as a Centre of Excellence (CoE) by the Research Council of Norway and the Norwegian University of Science and Technology (NTNU). Although the financing period by the Research Council of Norway finished in 2012, research activities are still ongoing in 2013 and 2014, financed by external means.

== Research areas ==
Research at CeSOS focuses on the creation of fundamental knowledge about the design and operation of future ships and ocean structures, using analytical, numerical and experimental studies. The centre has furthermore made it its responsibility to integrate marine hydrodynamics, structural mechanics and automatic control in its research. The knowledge that is being produced by this kind of research is vital, both now and in the future, for the design of safe, cost effective and environmentally friendly structures as well as in the planning and execution of marine operations. The importance of such work cannot be over-emphasised: In tonnage terms, 95 per cent of all international transport is by sea, and 20 per cent of the world’s oil and gas is produced from subsea reservoirs via offshore structures and pipelines. In the future, food production in aquacultural plants and the exploitation of renewable energy from the oceans is expected to play a growing role. The scientific and engineering research carried out in the centre takes account of such future needs, and extends current knowledge in relevant disciplines. The emphasis is on the synergy between hydrodynamics, structural mechanics and automatic control.

== Facts and Figures ==
Personnel at the end of 2012: 6 key professors, 2 administrative staff, 11 postdocs/researchers, 43 PhD candidates, 7 graduated PhD candidates, 28 graduated MSc students, 2 adjunct professors, 3 adjunct associate professors, 4 visiting professors (short term), 3 visiting INSEAN and MIT researchers (short term) and 5 visiting PhD candidates.

Revenues in 2012: Income NOK 43 388 000, Costs NOK 43 198 000.

Publications in 2012: 2 books, 14 book chapters, 10 international keynote lectures, 57 refereed journal papers and 95 refereed conference papers.

Commitment of the key persons to international journals, conferences and workshops in 2012: 21 editorial boards of journals and 14 international conference organising committees.
