= Gløshaugen =

Neighborhood in the city of Trondheim, Norway

- Neighborhood in Trondheim
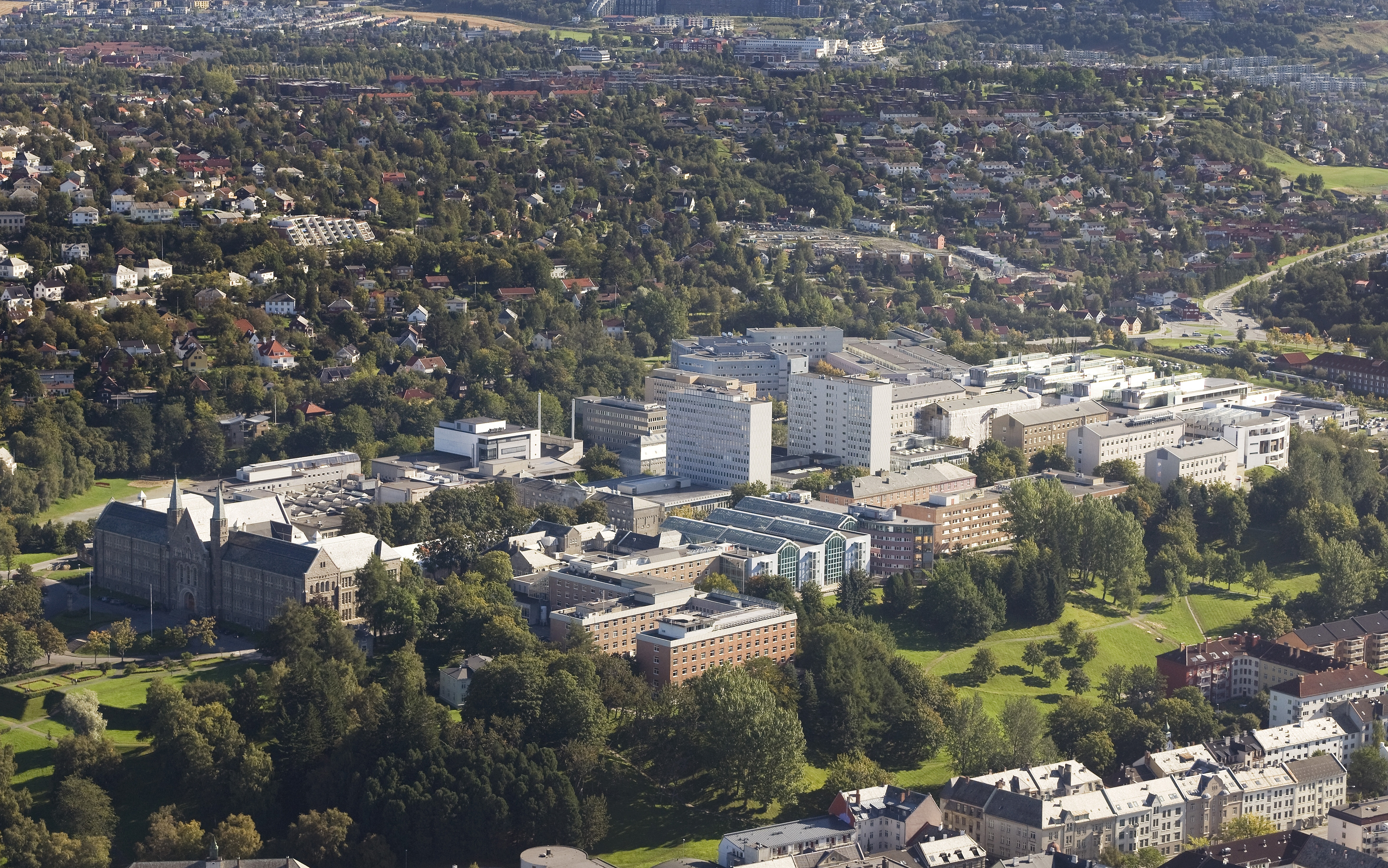
- View of the NTNU Gløshaugen from the air
- Interactive map of Gløshaugen
- Coordinates: 63.4186°N 10.4022°E
- Country: Norway
- Region: Central Norway
- County: Trøndelag
- Municipality: Trondheim Municipality
- Borough: Lerkendal
- Elevation: 45 m (148 ft)
- Time zone: UTC+01:00 (CET)
  - Summer (DST): UTC+02:00 (CEST)

Gløshaugen is a neighborhood in the city of Trondheim in Trøndelag county, Norway. It is located in the borough of Lerkendal, approximately 2 kilometres (1.2 mi) southeast of Midtbyen in Trondheim Municipality, the downtown center of Trondheim. It is situated east of the neighborhood of Elgeseter, west of Singsaker, and north of Lerkendal.

Gløshaugen is the site of NTNU Gløshaugen, the main campus and buildings of the Norwegian University of Science and Technology (NTNU). It was the previously the site of the Norwegian Institute of Technology (NTH) which became a part of NTNU after a merger. Most of the university science and engineering buildings are located at Gløshaugen.

== Gallery ==
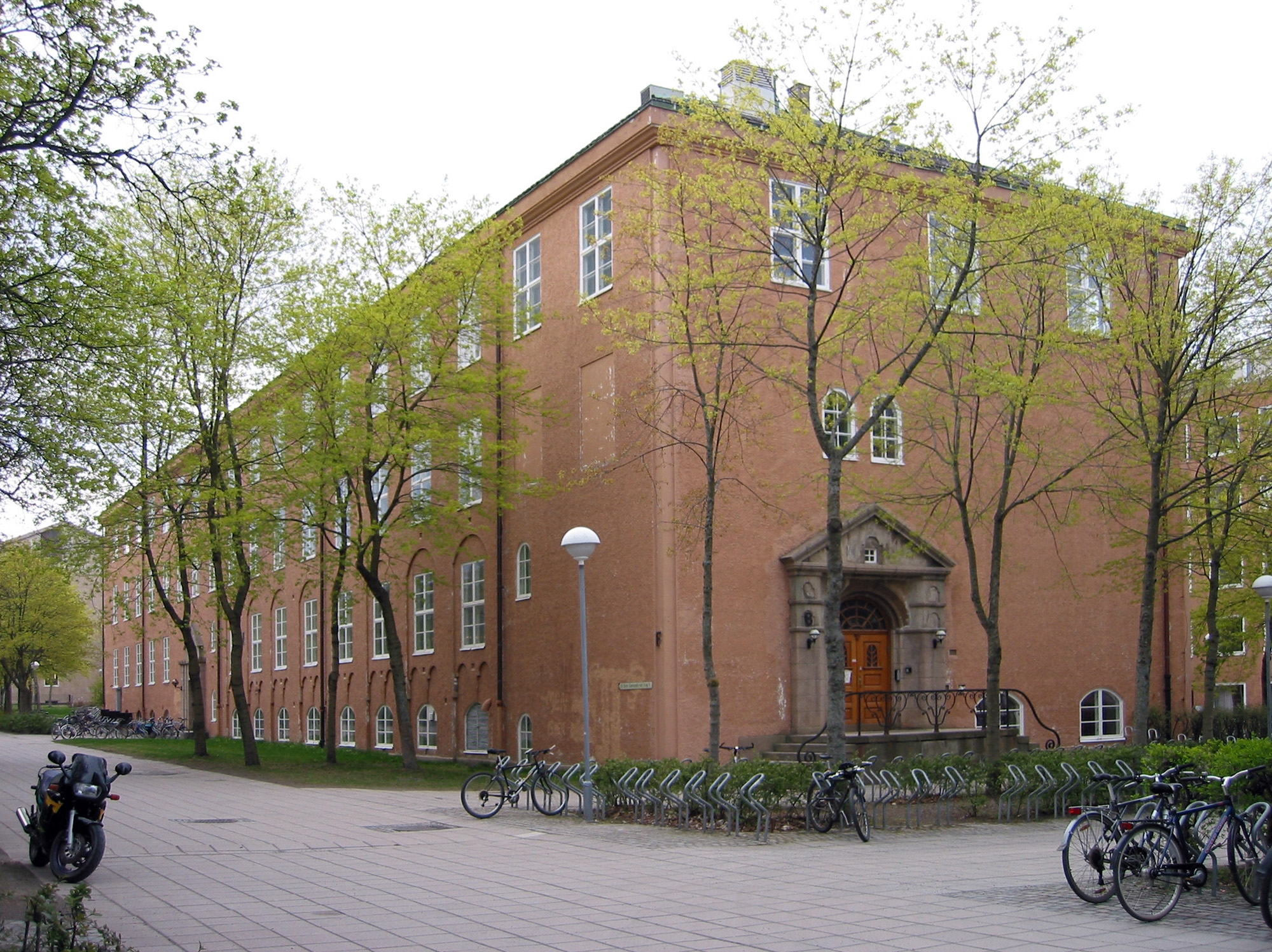
Gamle fysikk
old Physics Building at NTNU Gløshaugen

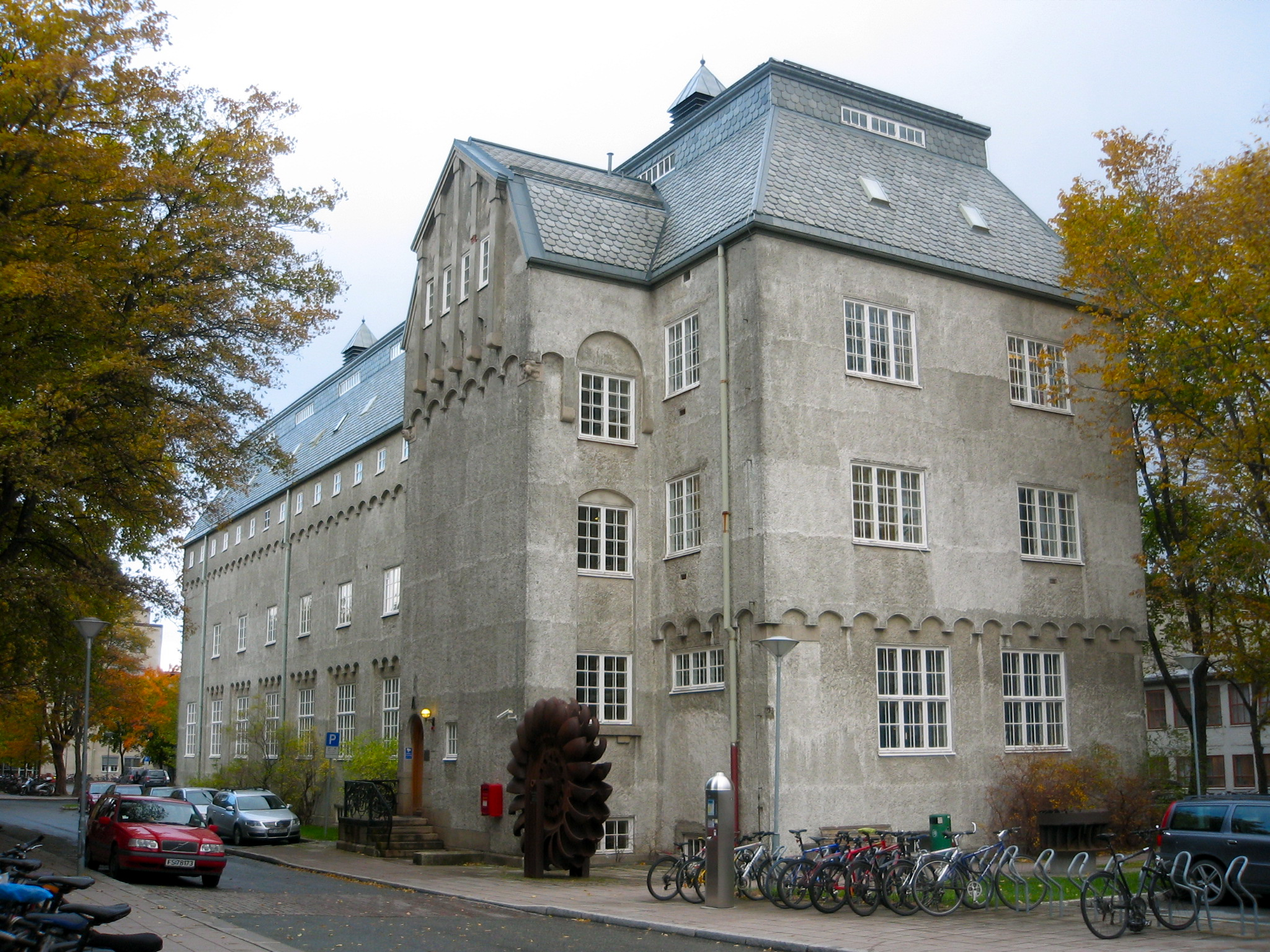
Vannkraftlaboratoriet
Hydropower Laboratory at NTNU Gløshaugen

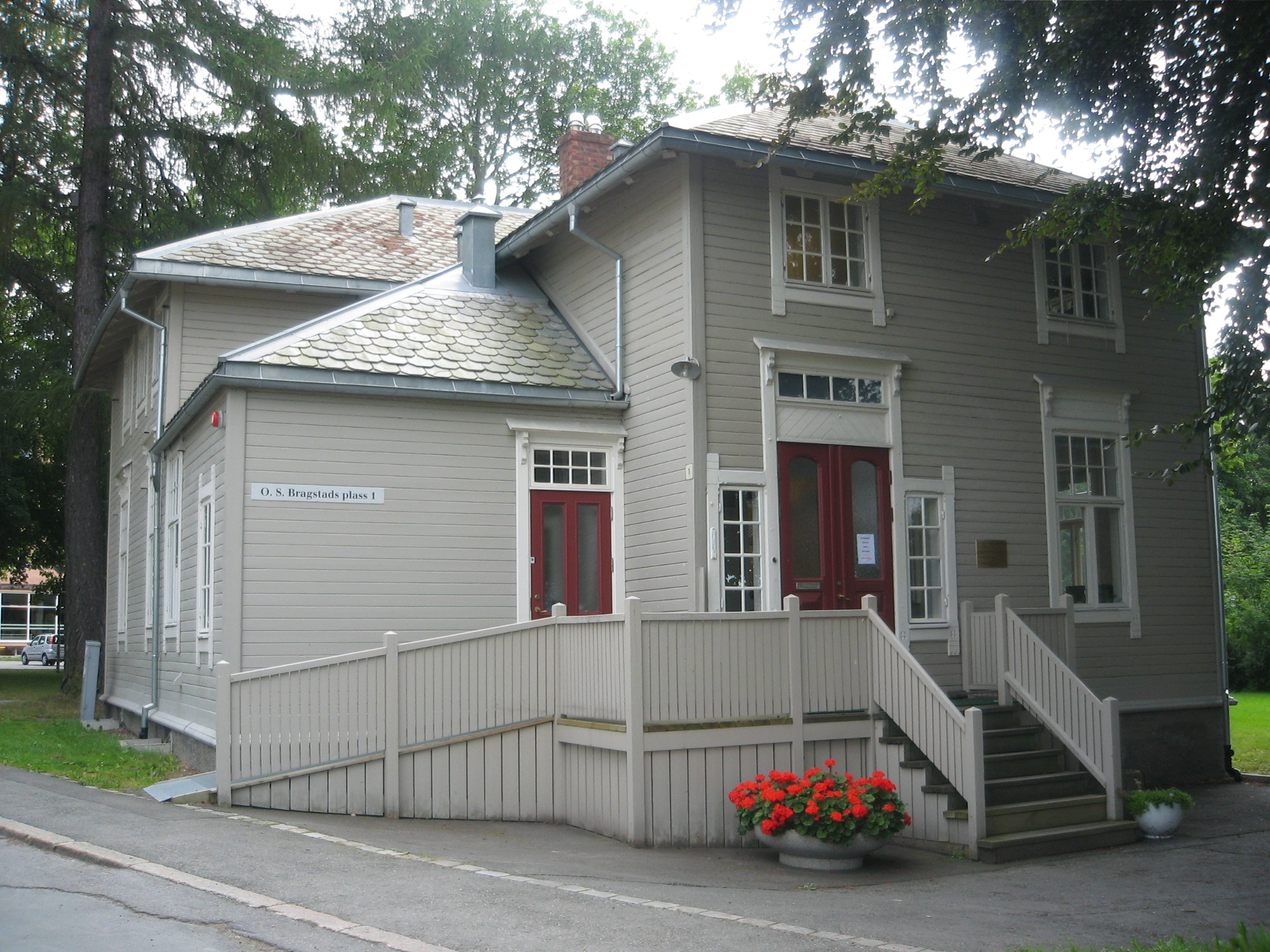
Infohuset
former Head Masters House at NTNU Gløshaugen

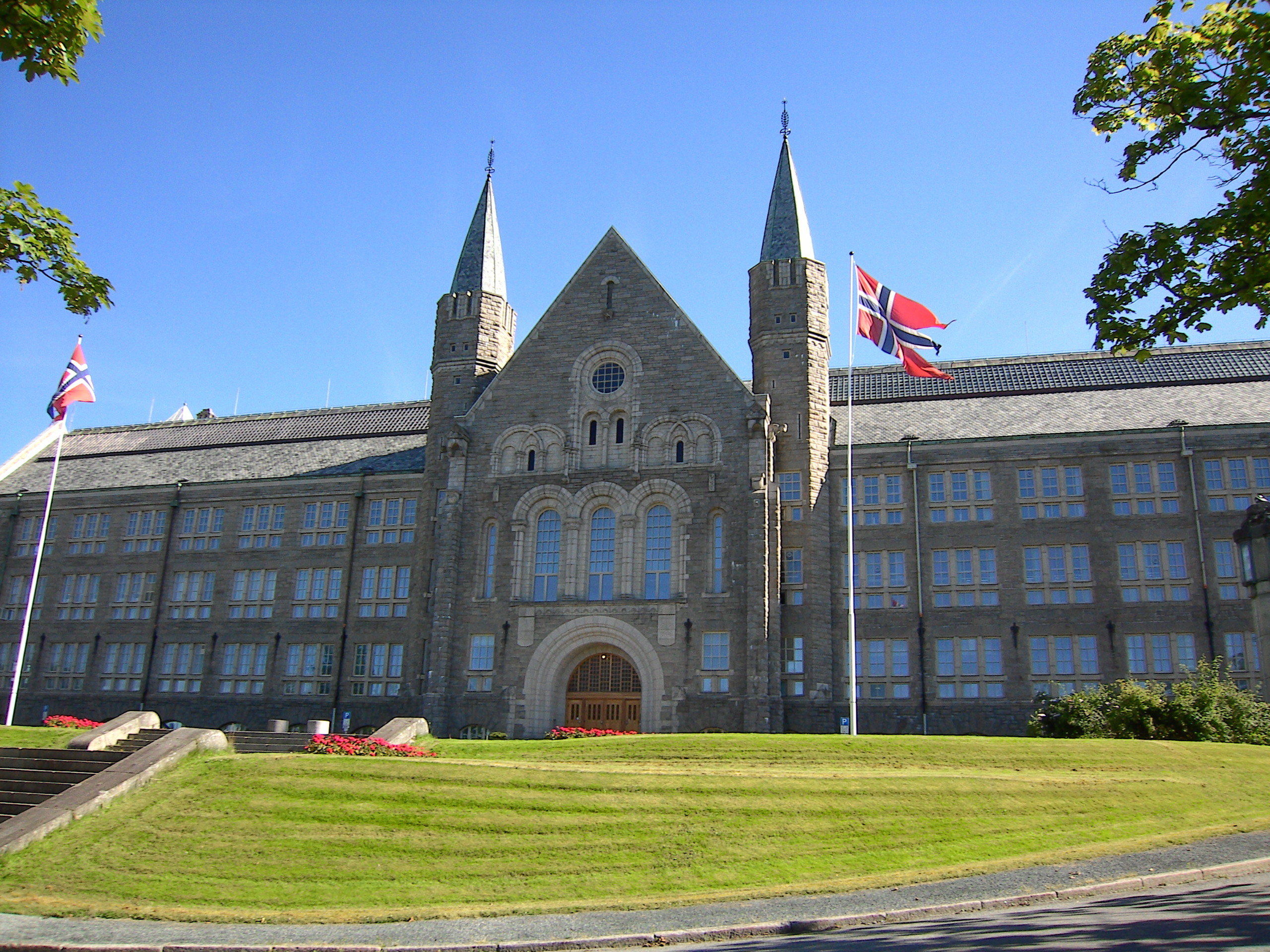
Hovedbygningen
main building at NTNU Gløshaugen

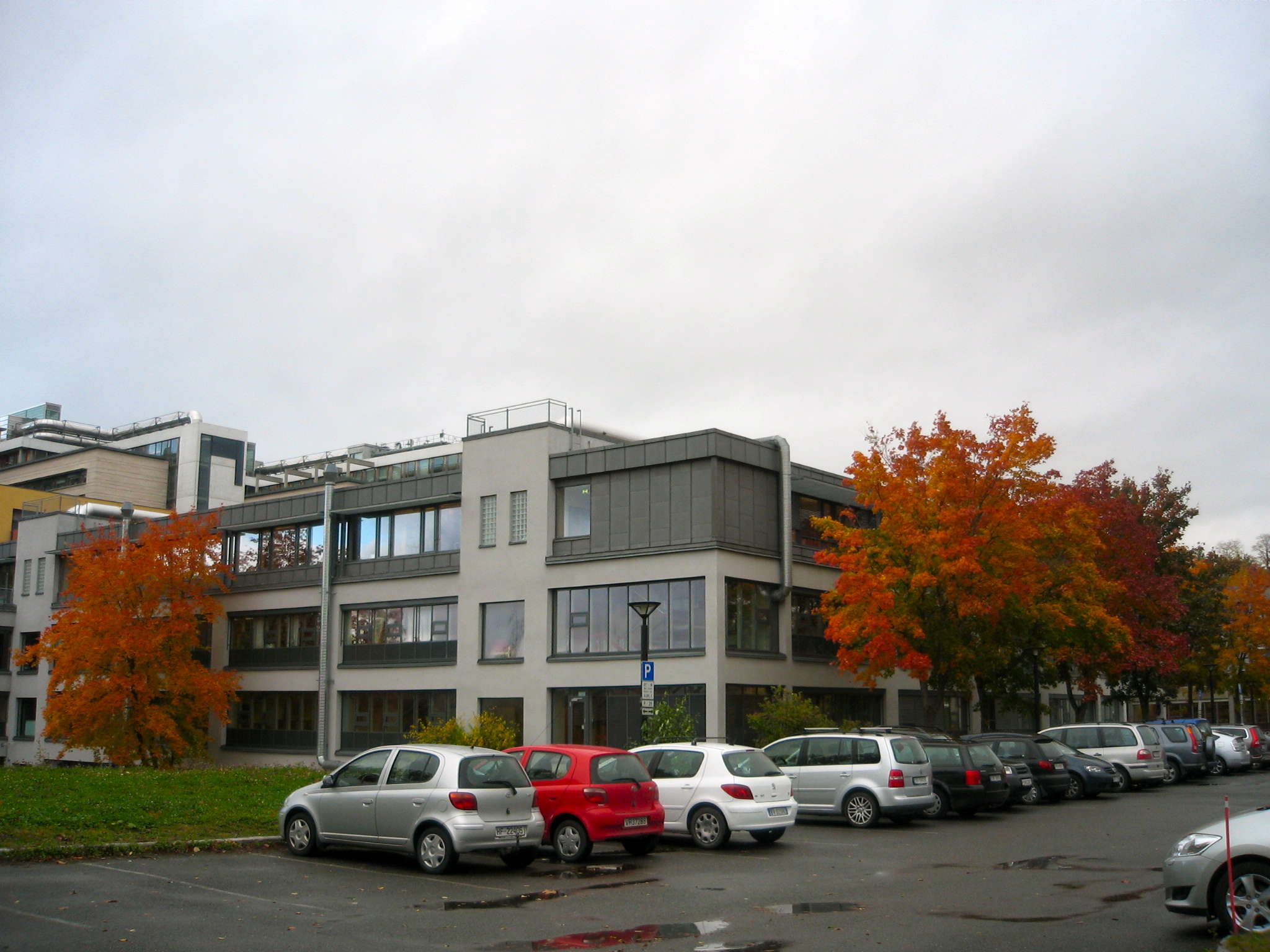
Byggteknisk
Building Technology building at NTNU Gløshaugen
