= Strindheim =

Neighborhood in the city of Trondheim, Norway

- Neighborhood in Trondheim
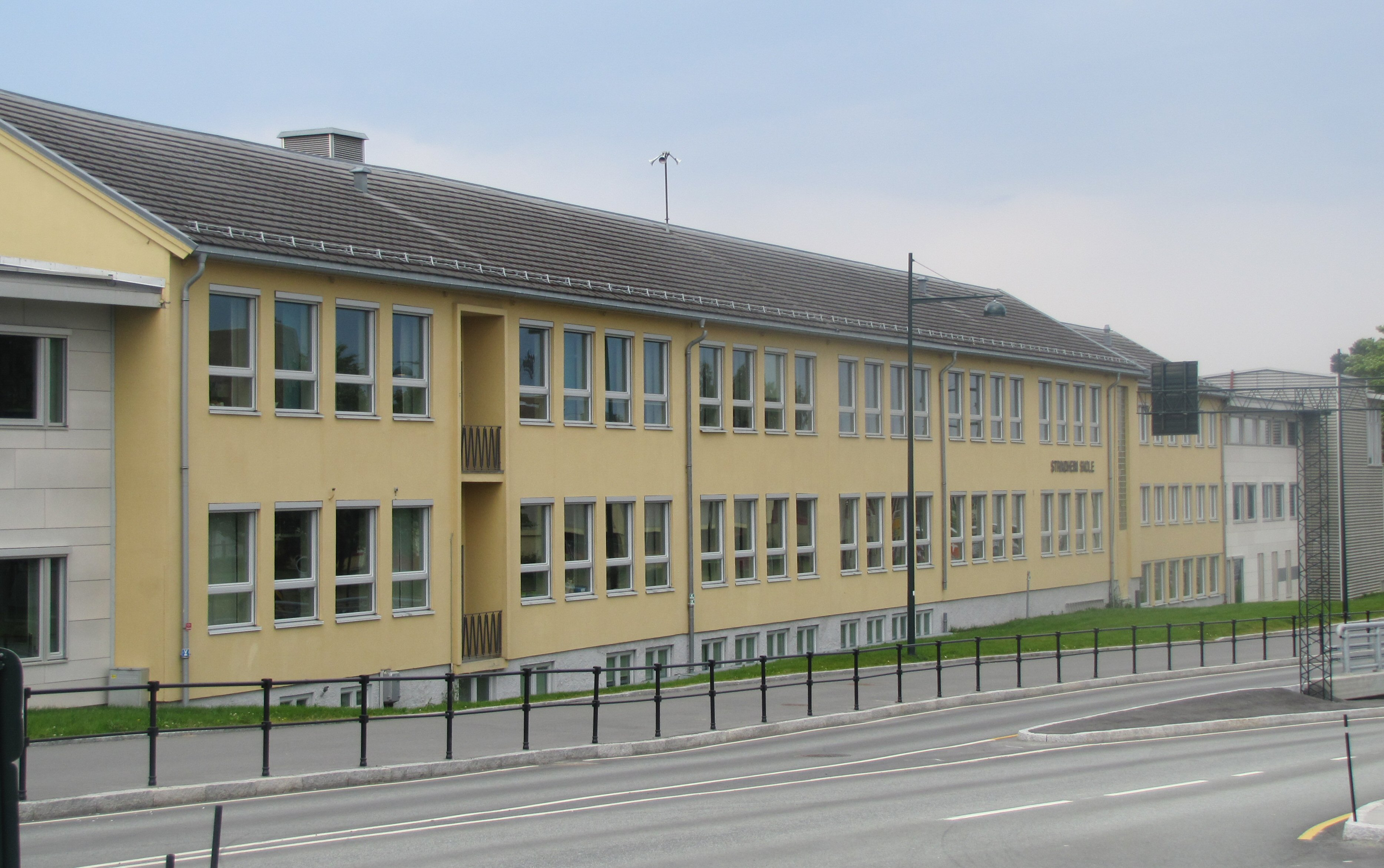
- View of the neighborhood school
- Interactive map of Strindheim
- Coordinates: 63.4267°N 10.4560°E
- Country: Norway
- Region: Central Norway
- County: Trøndelag
- Municipality: Trondheim Municipality
- Borough: Østbyen
- Elevation: 61 m (200 ft)
- Time zone: UTC+01:00 (CET)
  - Summer (DST): UTC+02:00 (CEST)

Strindheim is a neighbourhood in the city of Trondheim in Trøndelag county, Norway. It is located in the borough of Østbyen in Trondheim Municipality. It is the site of Strindheim Church, Strindheim School, the confectionery factory Nidar and the home area of Strindheim IL (Strindheim Idrettslag).
