= Bratsberg, Trøndelag =

Village in Trondheim Municipality, Norway

Bratsberg
- Village
- Interactive map of Bratsberg
- Location within Trøndelag Location within Norway
- Coordinates: 63.3494°N 10.48519°E
- Country: Norway
- Region: Central Norway
- County: Trøndelag
- Municipality: Trondheim Municipality
- Borough: Lerkendal

Area
  - Total: 0.27 km^{2} (0.10 sq mi)
- Elevation: 221 m (725 ft)

Population (2024)
  - Total: 371
  - Density: 1,374/km^{2} (3,560/sq mi)
- Time zone: UTC+01:00 (CET)
  - Summer (DST): UTC+02:00 (CEST)
- Post Code: 7039 Trondheim

Bratsberg is a village in Trondheim Municipality in Trøndelag county, Norway. The village is located in the borough of Lerkendal, between the village of Tanem and the lake Jonsvatnet.

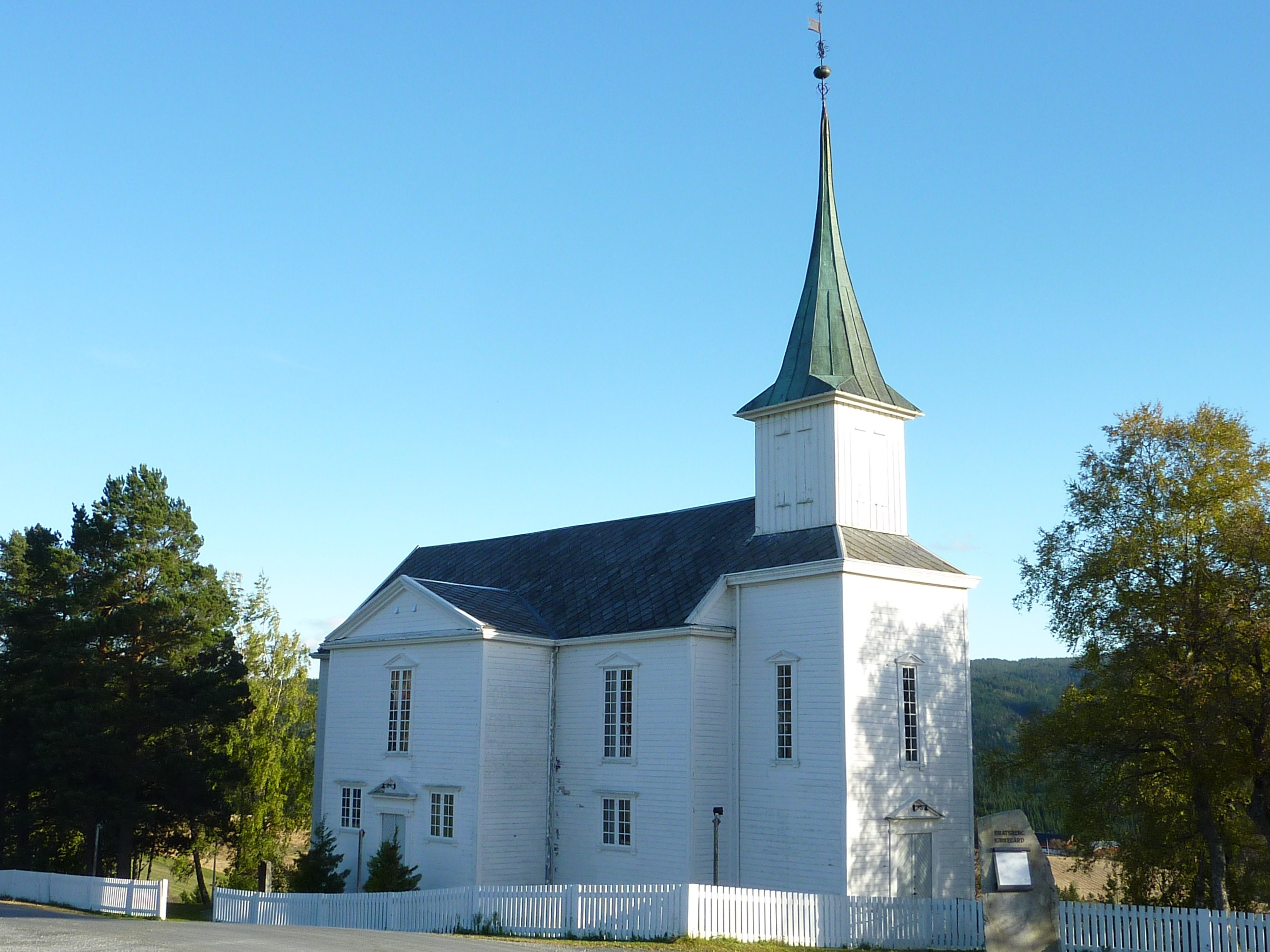
View of the local church

The 0.27-square-kilometre (67-acre) village has a population (2024) of 371 and a population density of 1,374 inhabitants per square kilometre (3,560/sq mi).

Bratsberg Church is located in the village.
