= Lerkendal =

Bydel Lerkendal
- Borough
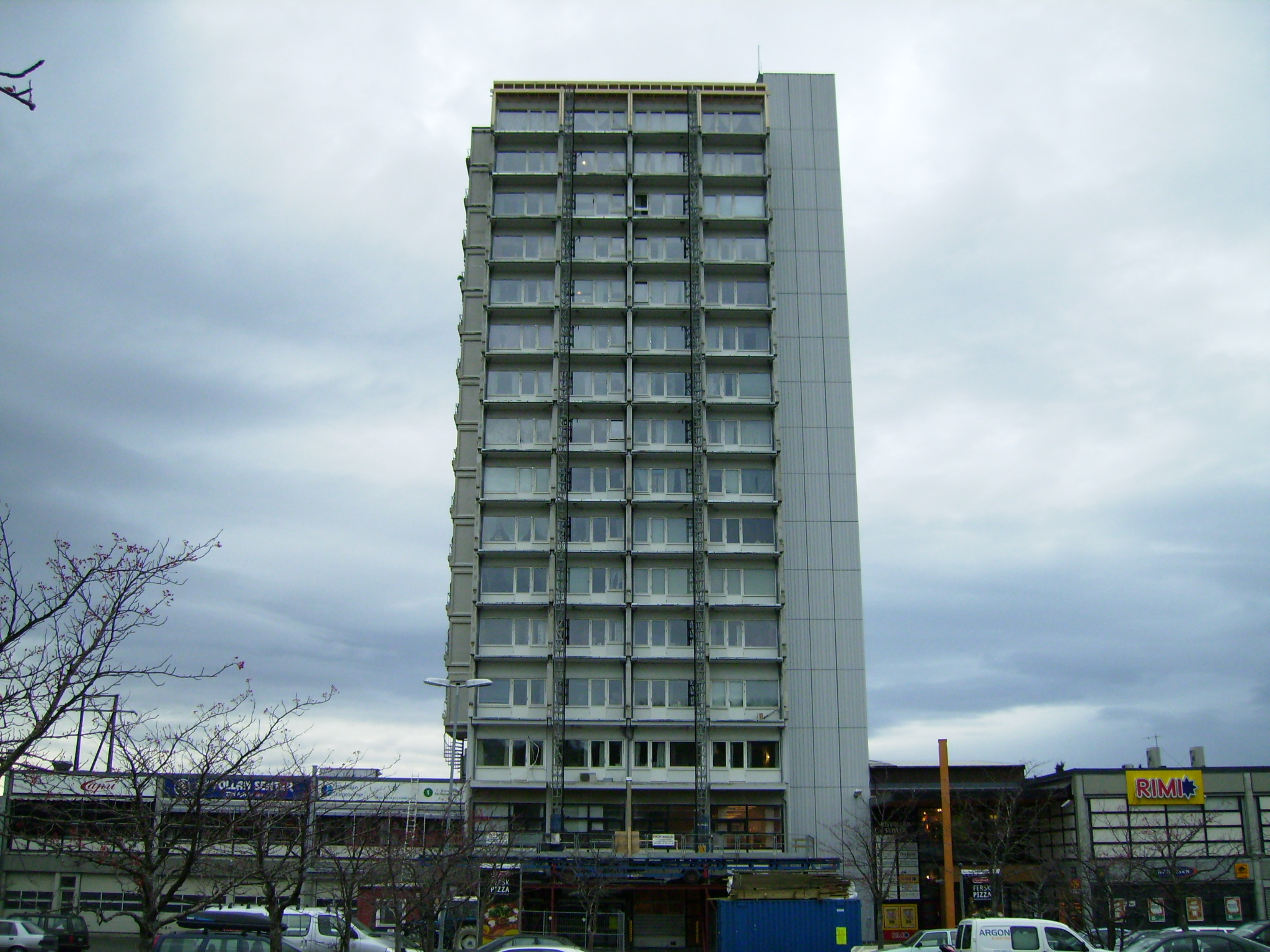
- Risvollan-borettslag-høyblokka

- Coat of arms
- Interactive map of Bydel Lerkendal
- Coordinates: 63.4133°N 10.4071°E
- Country: Norway
- Region: Central Norway
- County: Trøndelag
- Municipality: Trondheim Municipality
- City: Trondheim
- Elevation: 35 m (115 ft)
- Time zone: UTC+01:00 (CET)
  - Summer (DST): UTC+02:00 (CEST)
- Post Code: 7034 Trondheim

Lerkendal (Urban East Norwegian: [ˈlæ̂rkn̩dɑːɫ]) is a borough in Trondheim Municipality in Trøndelag county, Norway. The borough was established on 1 January 2005 in a municipal borough reform that reduced the number of boroughs in the city of Trondheim. The borough of Østbyen lies to the east, Midtbyen lies to the northwest, and Heimdal lies to the southwest. The boroughs oversee health, welfare, and education for their residents while the rest of the local government is done by Trondheim Municipality.

The borough is located south of Gløshaugen and Elgeseter, west of Berg, north of Tempe and mostly east of the river Nidelva. The area is dominated by the Norwegian University of Science and Technology, SINTEF, and Lerkendal Stadion (the home stadium of Rosenborg). The area also has a railway line, Stavne–Leangen Line, running through it with one station, Lerkendal Station, that is served by the local tran service Trøndelag Commuter Rail. The borough of Lerkendal consists of the neighborhoods and villages of Bratsberg, Dragvoll, Elgeseter, Flatåsen, Gløshaugen, Lerkendal, Moholt, Nardo, Risvollan, Sjetnemarka, Valentinlyst, Fossegrenda and Åsvang.

== See also ==
- List of boroughs in Trondheim prior to 2005
