= Moholt =

Neighborhood in the city of Trondheim, Norway

- Neighborhood in Trondheim
- Interactive map of Moholt
- Coordinates: 63.4090°N 10.4327°E
- Country: Norway
- Region: Central Norway
- County: Trøndelag
- Municipality: Trondheim Municipality
- Borough: Lerkendal
- Elevation: 123 m (404 ft)
- Time zone: UTC+01:00 (CET)
  - Summer (DST): UTC+02:00 (CEST)

Moholt is a neighborhood in the city of Trondheim in Trøndelag county, Norway. It is situated in the borough of Lerkendal in Trondheim Municipality. It is located south of Tyholt and north of Loholt. The area is dominated by housing, including a lot of student housing. There are also some supermarkets and commercial enterprises in the area, primarily because of the proximity to the European route E06 highway. Also located at Moholt is the Trondheim Business School, a faculty of Sør-Trøndelag University College.
