= Ila Line =

Tram line in Trondheim, Norway

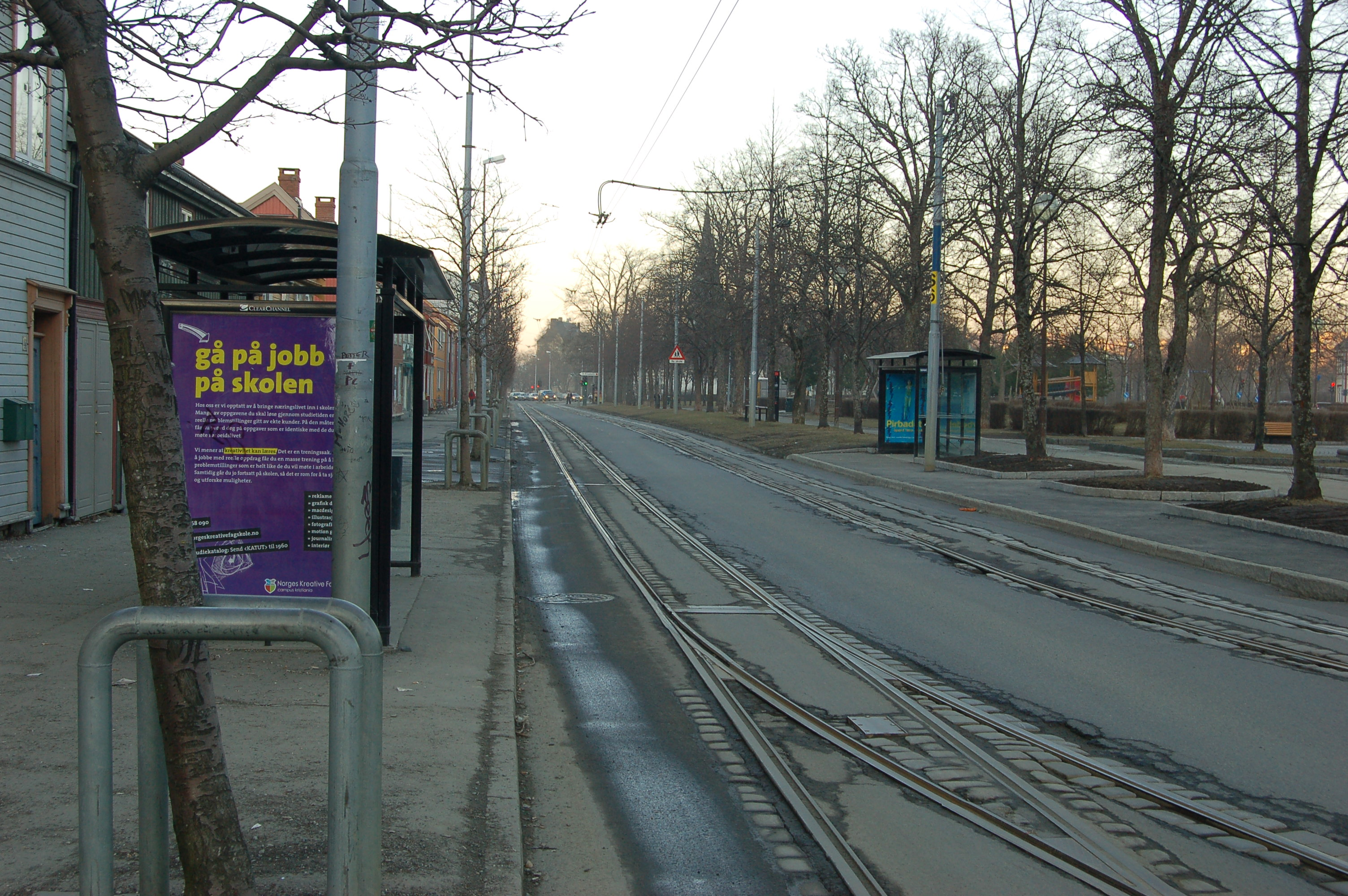
- Ila Station

Overview
- Native name: Ilalinjen
- Owner: City of Trondheim
- Termini: Munkegata; Ila
- Stations: 6

Service
- Type: Tramway
- System: Trondheim Tramway
- Operator(s): Boreal Bane

History
- Opened: 1901
- Closed: 1988–1990

Technical
- Number of tracks: Double
- Track gauge: 1,000 mm (3 ft 3 3/8 in)

The Ila Line (Norwegian: Ilalinjen) is tramway between Trondheim Torg and Ila in Trondheim, Norway. The line was part of the original Trondheim Tramway and opened in 1901, and replaced the horse omnibus service from 1893. The line was closed in 1988, but part of it was reopened in 1990 when the Gråkall Line was reborn. The line is the northernmost tramway in the world and is meter gauge.

The line follows Kongens Gate from Ilevollen to Trondheim Torg and was operated by Trondheim Sporvei until 1974. When A/S Graakalbanen started its tram service in 1924 it licensed the track to get to its terminus at St. Olav's Gate. In 1921 a loop was constructed around Ila Park at the end of line so the trams didn't have to change directions, though this was rebuilt to a turning triangle in 1983. In 1973 most of the departures of Ilalinjen continued to Lian. But for some years (until approximately 1975) some departures turned in Ila in the evenings and weekends.
