= Ila tram stop =

Tram stop in Trondheim, Norway

Ila
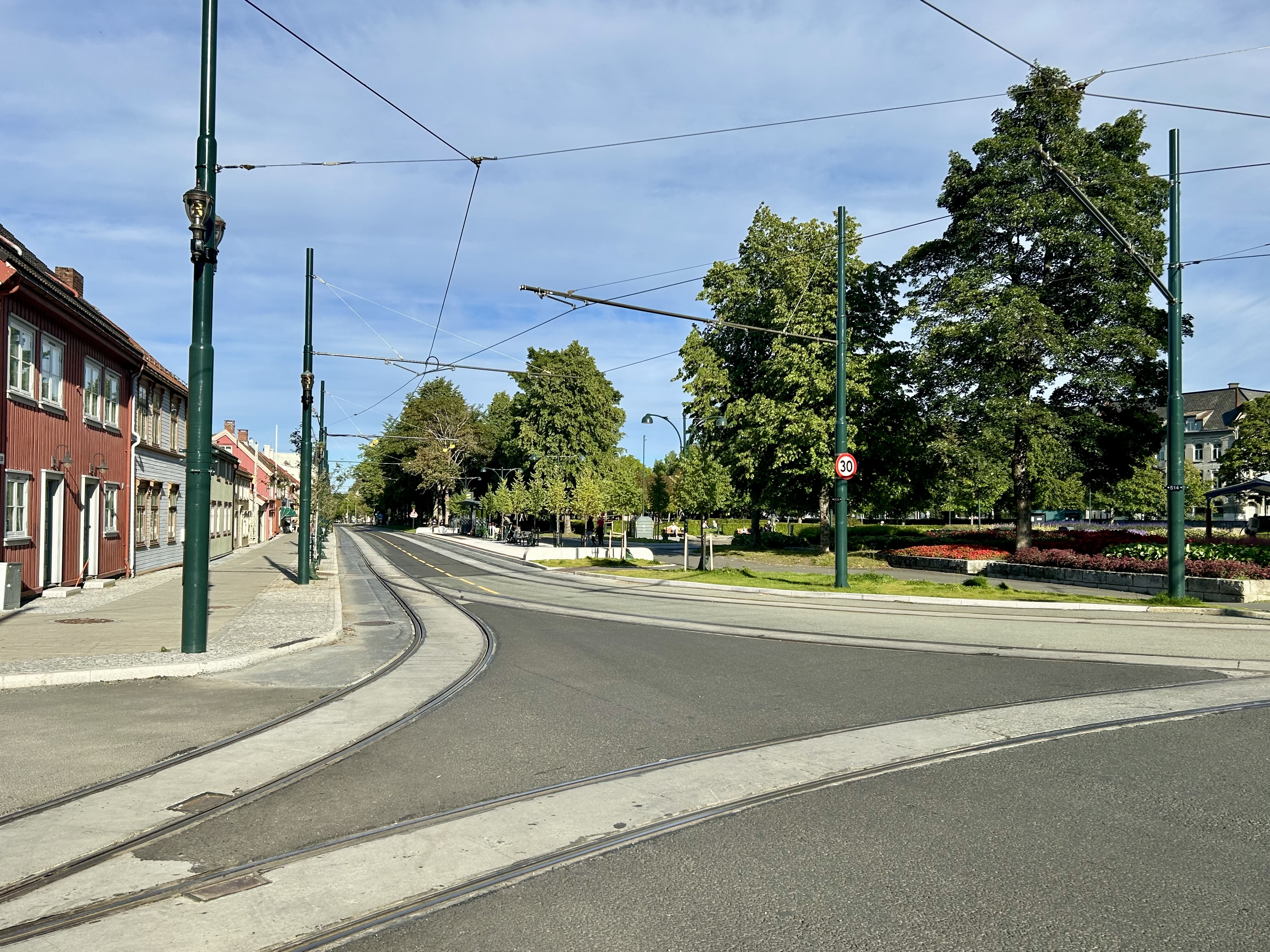
- Ila tram stop, looking eastwards

General information
- Location: Ila
- Coordinates: 63°25′45″N 10°22′05″E
- Line: Gråkallbanen
- Connections: Bus Line 3, 11, 21, 26, 28, 52, 75, 76; Fosen

History
- Opened: 1901
Location

Ila, formerly Ilevolden, is a tram stop on the Trondheim Tramway, located at Ila, Trondheim in Trondheim, Norway. It was the original terminus of Ilalinjen, the first tramway and opened in 1901. In 1924 it also became a stop for the private Gråkallbanen that ran to Lian.

The station featured at first a loop around the park it served, but it was later changed to a turning triangle. It was the terminus for Line 1 of Trondheim Sporvei until 1971 when it was merged with A/S Graakalbanen and Line 1 was extended to Lian. The stop is also a stop for bus lines 5 and 8, as well as for buses heading to Trolla and Fosen. The stop primarily serves the residential areas at Ila.

Preceding station	Trondheim Tramway	Following station
Bergsligata towards Lian	Gråkallbanen	Skansen towards St. Olavs Gate
