= Midtbyen =

Midtbyen is the Danish and Norwegian word for a city or town centre. The name is often used to refer to specific areas in a city.

Midtbyen may refer to:

- Midtbyen, Aarhus, the city centre of the city of Aarhus in Denmark
- Midtbyen, Bodø, a borough in the city of Bodø in Nordland county, Norway
- Midtbyen, Kongsvinger, a borough in the city of Kongsvinger in Innlandet county, Norway
- Midtbyen, Trondheim, a borough in the city of Trondheim in Trøndelag county, Norway
