= Trolla =

Village in Trondheim Municipality, Norway

- Village
- Interactive map of Trolla
- Location within Trøndelag Location within Norway
- Coordinates: 63.4516°N 10.3102°E
- Country: Norway
- Region: Central Norway
- County: Trøndelag
- Municipality: Trondheim Municipality
- Borough: Midtbyen

Area
  - Total: 0.23 km^{2} (0.089 sq mi)
- Elevation: 21 m (69 ft)

Population (2024)
  - Total: 536
  - Density: 2,330/km^{2} (6,000/sq mi)
- Time zone: UTC+01:00 (CET)
  - Summer (DST): UTC+02:00 (CEST)
- Post Code: 7018 Trondheim

Trolla is a village in Trondheim Municipality in Trøndelag county, Norway. It is located in the Midtbyen borough, along the Trondheimsfjord on the north coast of the Bymarka area. It is about 10 kilometres (6.2 mi) northeast of the village of Langørjan and about 4 kilometres (2.5 mi) northwest of the Ila neighborhood in the city of Trondheim.

The 0.23-square-kilometre (57-acre) village has a population (2024) of 536 and a population density of 2,330 inhabitants per square kilometre (6,000/sq mi).
