= Munkegata Terminal =

Former bus station in Trondheim, Norway

Coordinates: 63°25′57″N 10°23′38″E

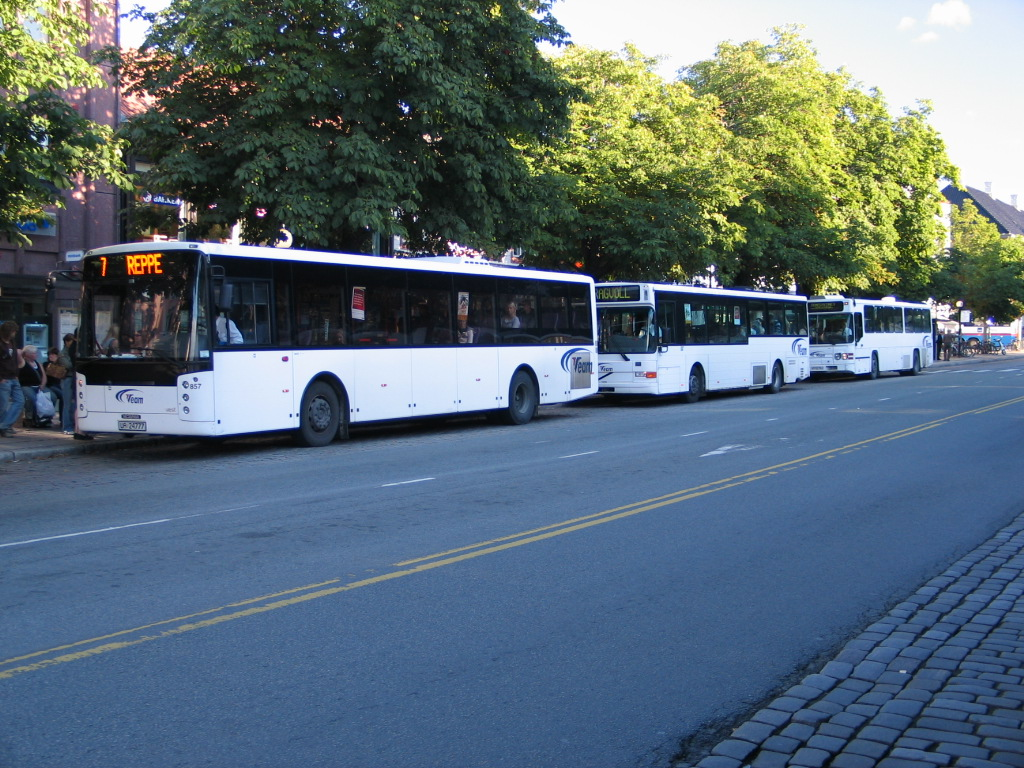
Buses from Team Trafikk at Munkegata Terminal

Munkegata Terminal was the main bus station in Trondheim, Norway until August 2019. The main bus terminal is now located in Prinsenkrysset.

All buses to and from Trondheim, with the sole exception of the Airport Express Bus and TrønderBilene stopped at the terminal, that is located on the streets of Munkegata and Dronningens gate on Trondheim Torg in Midtbyen. The terminal also housed the corporate offices of Team Trafikk, the city bus company in Trondheim until June 2018.

The terminal was divided into four sections each direction on Munkegata and two sections each direction on Dronningens gate. Each bus route stopped at a consequent stop in each direction, making it possible to manage a terminal that is two blocks long. One of the stops served regional buses from Gauldal Billag, Klæburuten, Nettbuss and NOR-WAY Bussekspress.

At Trondheim Central Station there is also a bus station, but this only serves regional- and express buses in addition to some city buses. Before 1961 the Trondheim Tramway went through Munkegata, but was moved to go down Prinsens gate instead of aesthetical reasons. The present tram stop for Gråkallbanen stops two blocks away at St. Olav's Gate.
