= Gråkallen =

Mountain in Trøndelag, Norway

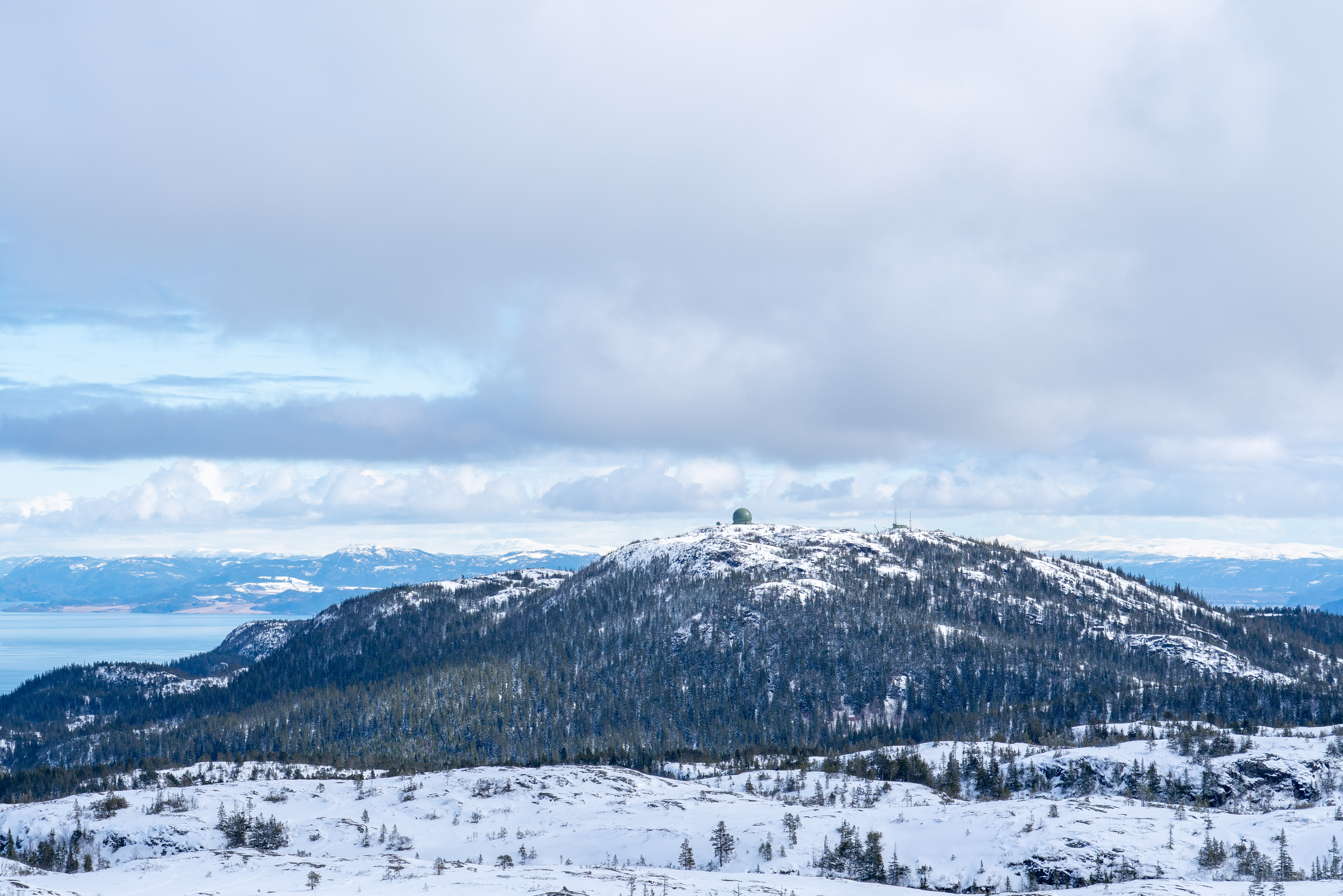
- Gråkallen seen from Bosbergheia

Highest point
- Elevation: 552 m (1,811 ft)
- Prominence: 160 m (520 ft)
- Parent peak: Storheia
- Coordinates: 63°25′14″N 10°15′05″E

Geography
- Interactive map of the mountain
- Location: Trøndelag, Norway
- Topo map: 1621 IV Trondheim

Climbing
- Easiest route: Road

Gråkallen is a mountain in the Bymarka area of Trondheim Municipality in Trøndelag county, Norway. The 552-metre (1,811 ft) tall mountain is located in the Byåsen part of the city of Trondheim.

The summit is covered by an abandoned fenced military installation. Below the summit (on the col to the right of the summit above the lake) there is a ski station accessible by bus from Trondheim. In the summer, the ski runs through the pine forests allow hiking and mountain biking back to the city below.

== Name ==
The first element is grå which means "grey" and the last element is the finite form of kall which means "old man". (It is common in Norway to compare mountains with old men.)
