= Ila, Trondheim =

Neighborhood in the city of Trondheim, Norway

Ila Ilen
- Neighborhood in Trondheim
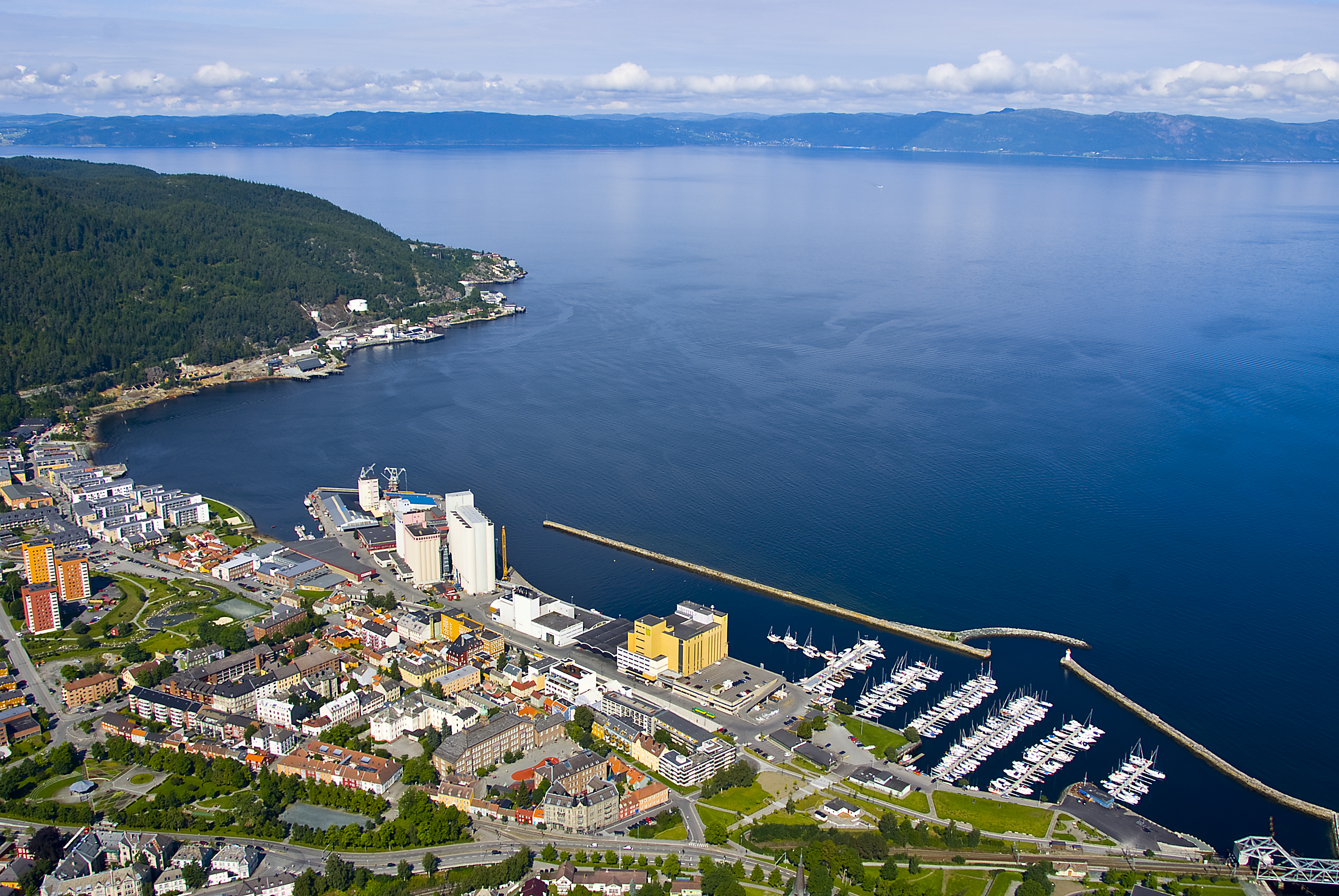
- View of Ila and Skansen
- Interactive map of Ila
- Coordinates: 63.4302°N 10.3687°E
- Country: Norway
- Region: Central Norway
- County: Trøndelag
- Municipality: Trondheim Municipality
- Borough: Midtbyen
- Elevation: 11 m (36 ft)
- Time zone: UTC+01:00 (CET)
  - Summer (DST): UTC+02:00 (CEST)

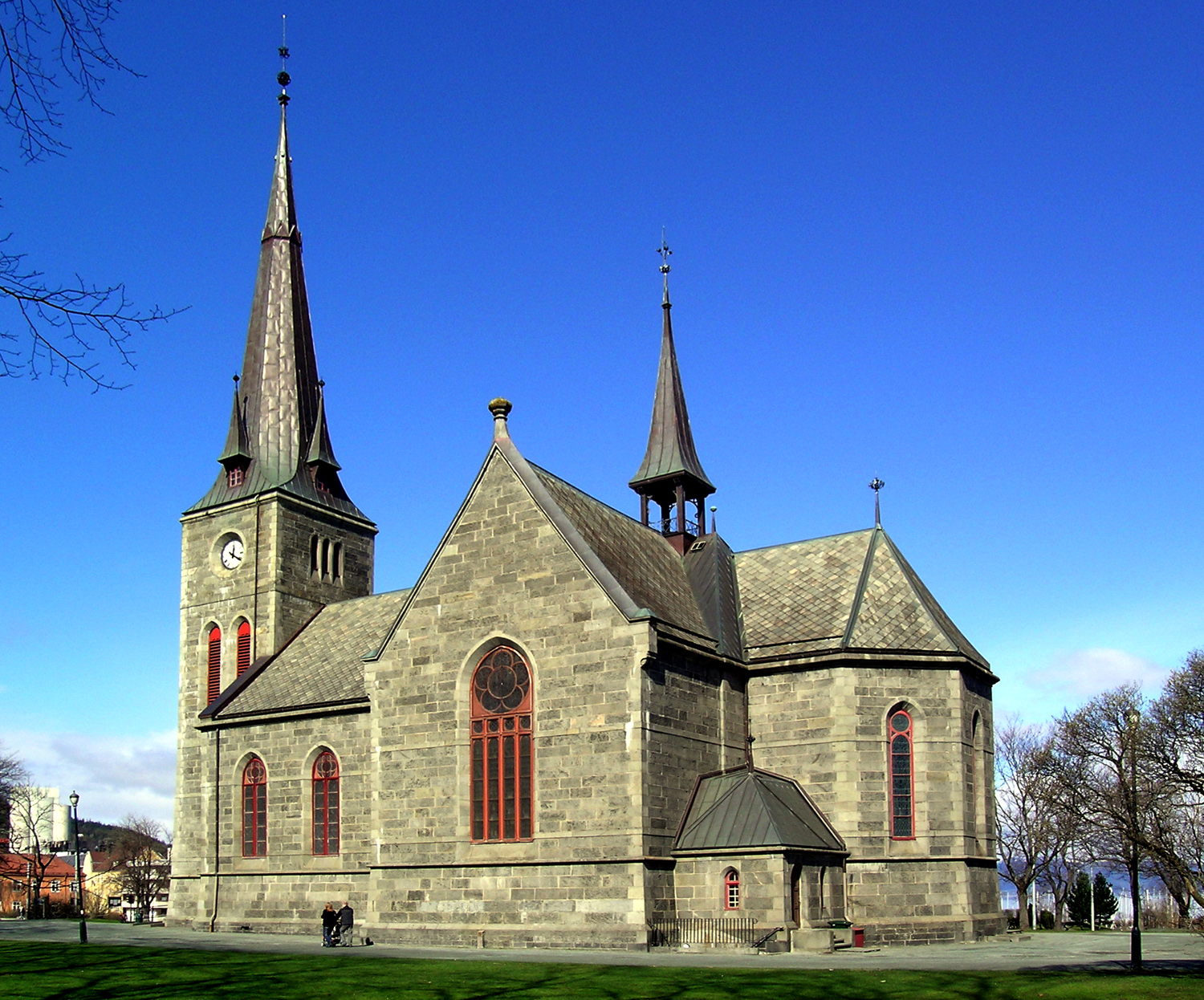
Ilen Church

Ila is a neighborhood in the city of Trondheim in Trøndelag county, Norway. It is located in the borough of Midtbyen in Trondheim Municipality, just west the central downtown area of Trondheim. Ila is bordered by the river Nidelva in the south, Skansen in the north, and Steinberget, Bymarka, and Ilsvikøra in the west. The area is mostly residential, with some industry and commerce. The Gråkallbanen tram line runs through Ila and the area is served by the Skansen Train Station on the Trønderbanen commuter train line. Nordre Avlastningsvei, which was completed during 2010, connects Ila via Brattøra to Lademoen.

== History ==
The first settlement at Ila was in the second half of the 18th century. During the 19th century, the area developed as the entertainment centre of Trondheim, with dance saloons, pubs, and liquor stores. In 1826, it was the site for the first Norwegian Constitution Day parade. During the late 19th century the area started being redeveloped into dense labour-class housing, with a school opening in 1877. Ilen Church (Norwegian: Ila kirke) was opened in 1889 and in 1893 Ilalinjen, a horsecar line, was built with Ila Station as the terminus and rebuilt to a tramway in 1901.

== Notable people ==
- Jørn Goldstein (born 1953), Olympic ice hockey goalie

== Other sources ==
- Terje Bratberg (1996). Trondheim Byleksikon. Kunnskapsforlaget. ISBN 82-573-0642-8.
