= Storheia =

Mountain in Trøndelag, Norway

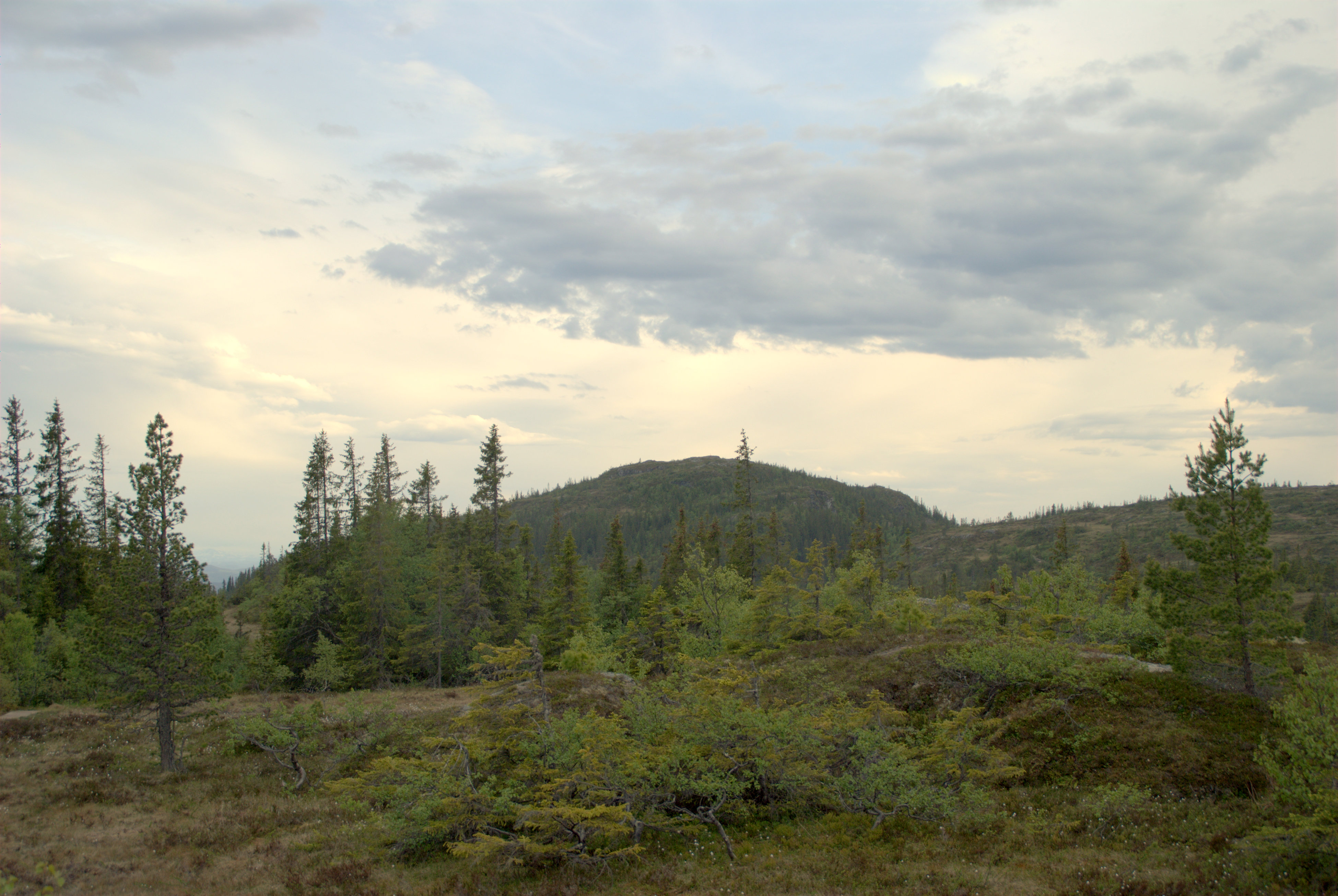
- Storheia.

Highest point
- Elevation: 565 m (1,854 ft)
- Prominence: 420 m (1,380 ft)
- Isolation: 15.72 to 15.74 km (9.77 to 9.78 mi)
- Coordinates: 63.4022°N 10.2010°E

Geography
- Interactive map of the mountain
- Location: Trøndelag, Norway
- Topo map: 1621 IV Trondheim

Storheia is the highest mountain in the Bymarka area of Trondheim Municipality in Trøndelag county, Norway. The 565-metre (1,854 ft) tall mountain lies about 3 kilometres (1.9 mi) east of the village of Langørjan. On clear days, one can stand atop Storheia and see as far as the mountain Snøhetta, about 130 kilometres (81 mi) away. The smaller mountain Gråkallen lies just to the northeast.

== Name ==
The first element is stor which means "big" and the last element is the finite form of hei which means "upland" or "hill".
