= Ilen Church =

Church in Trøndelag, Norway

- Ilen kirke
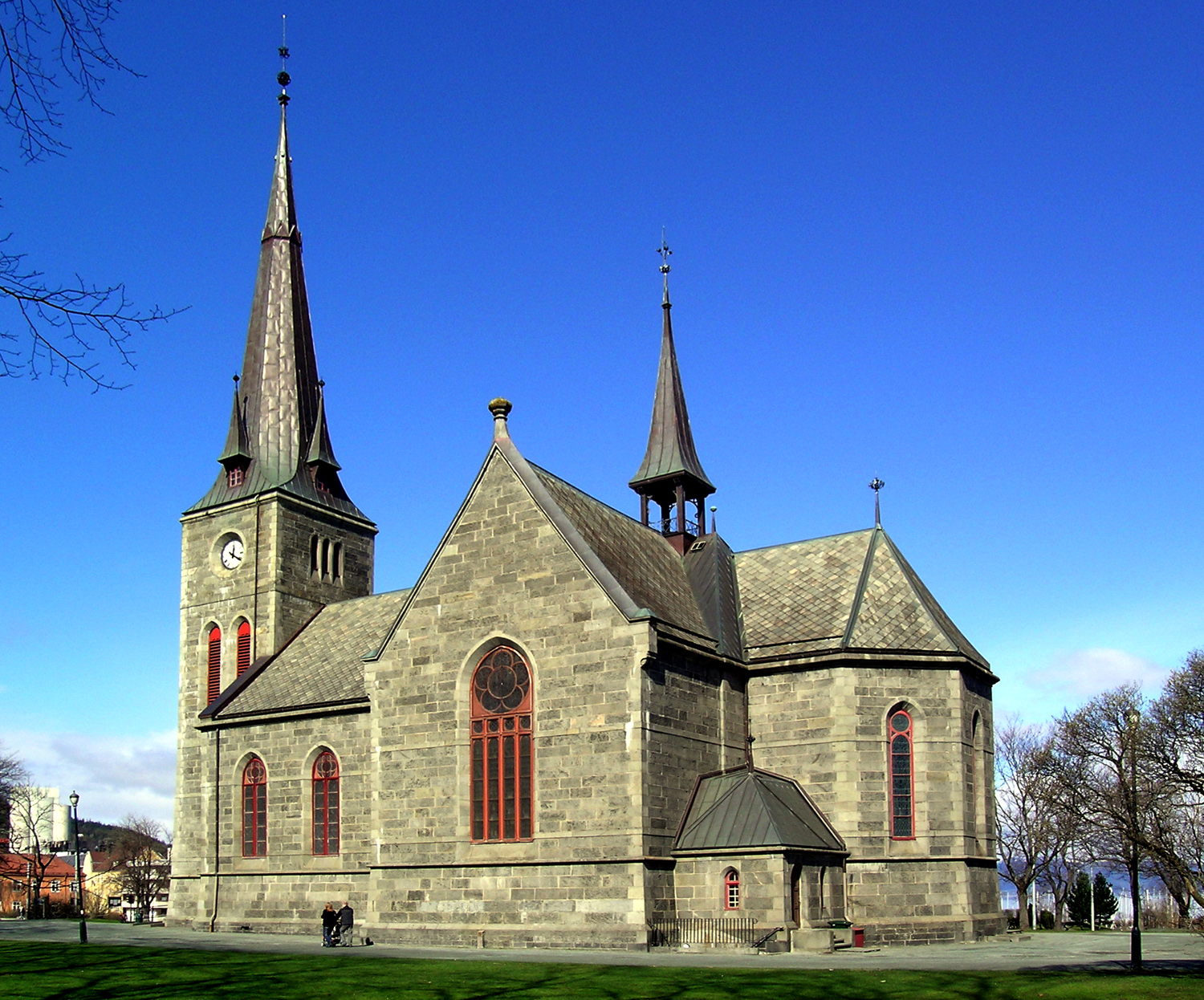
- View of the church
- Ilen Church
- 63.4299°N 10.3763°E
- Location: Trondheim Municipality, Trøndelag
- Country: Norway
- Denomination: Church of Norway
- Churchmanship: Evangelical Lutheran

History
- Status: Parish church
- Founded: 1889
- Consecrated: 7 June 1889

Architecture
- Functional status: Active
- Architect: Eugene Sissenére
- Architectural type: Cruciform
- Style: Neo-Gothic
- Completed: 1889 (137 years ago)

Specifications
- Capacity: 550
- Materials: Stone

Administration
- Diocese: Nidaros bispedømme
- Deanery: Heimdal og Byåsen prosti
- Parish: Ilen
- Norwegian Cultural Heritage Site
- Type: Church
- Status: Listed
- ID: 84712

Ilen Church (Norwegian: Ilen kirke) is a parish church of the Church of Norway in Trondheim Municipality in Trøndelag county, Norway. It is located in the Ila area in the city of Trondheim, on the 250-metre (820 ft) wide isthmus between the river Nid and the Trondheimsfjord. It is the church for the Ilen parish which is part of the Heimdal og Byåsen prosti (deanery) in the Diocese of Nidaros. The gray, stone church was built in a cruciform style in 1889 by the local building company of Jacob Digre, according to a design by Trondheim based architect Eugene Sissenére (b. 1858). The church seats about 550 people, although it originally fit about 900. The seating was reduced to meet the fire regulations.

A graveyard belonging to the parish is located at Ilsvika in the neighboring district of Ila, a short distance from the church site.

== History ==
Ilen Church was built over a period of three years from 1886 to 1889 using drawings by the architect Eugene Sissenére. The building was consecrated on 7 June 1889. The church was the first post-Reformation parish church to be built in Trondheim, and it is supposedly the oldest post-Reformation church in Norway with its façades carved in stone. For financial reasons, the church was given wooden ceilings, even though it was originally supposed to have brick vaults. The Renaissance-style altarpiece from 1932 was made by Roar Matheson Bye. The historic organ (18/II/P/M) in the church was built by Claus Jensen (1817-1892) during 1889. It was restored in 2017 by Trøndelag-based organ building company, Br. Torkildsen Orgelbyggeri A/S.

== Media gallery ==
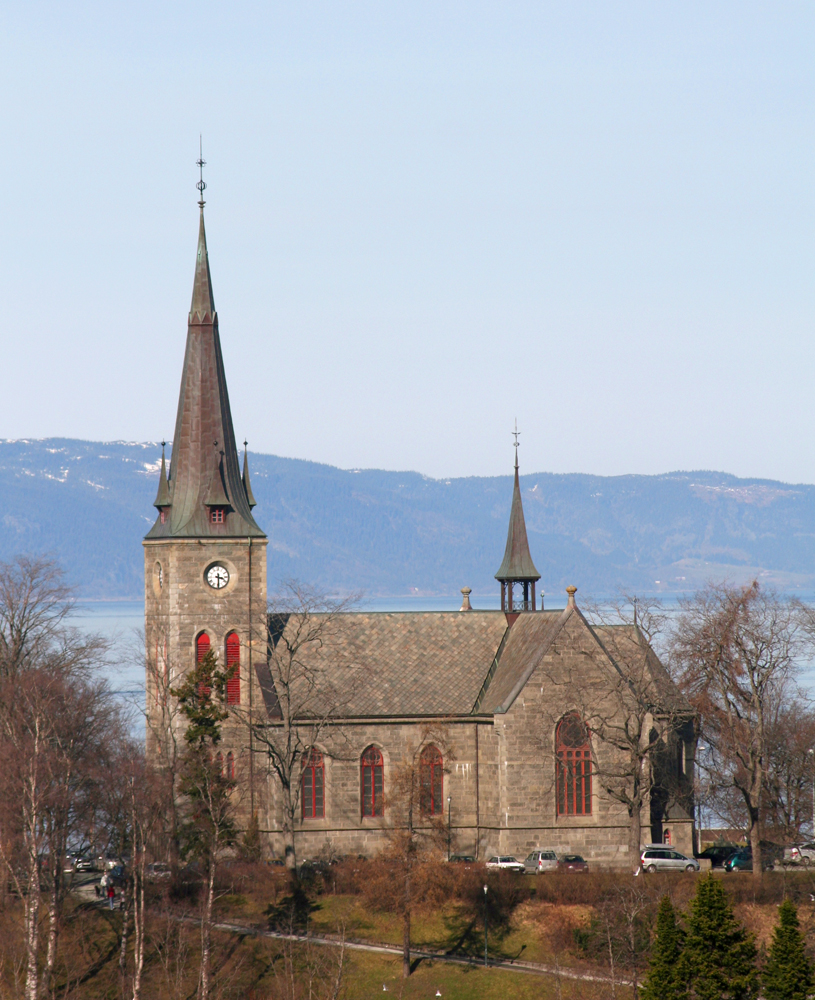

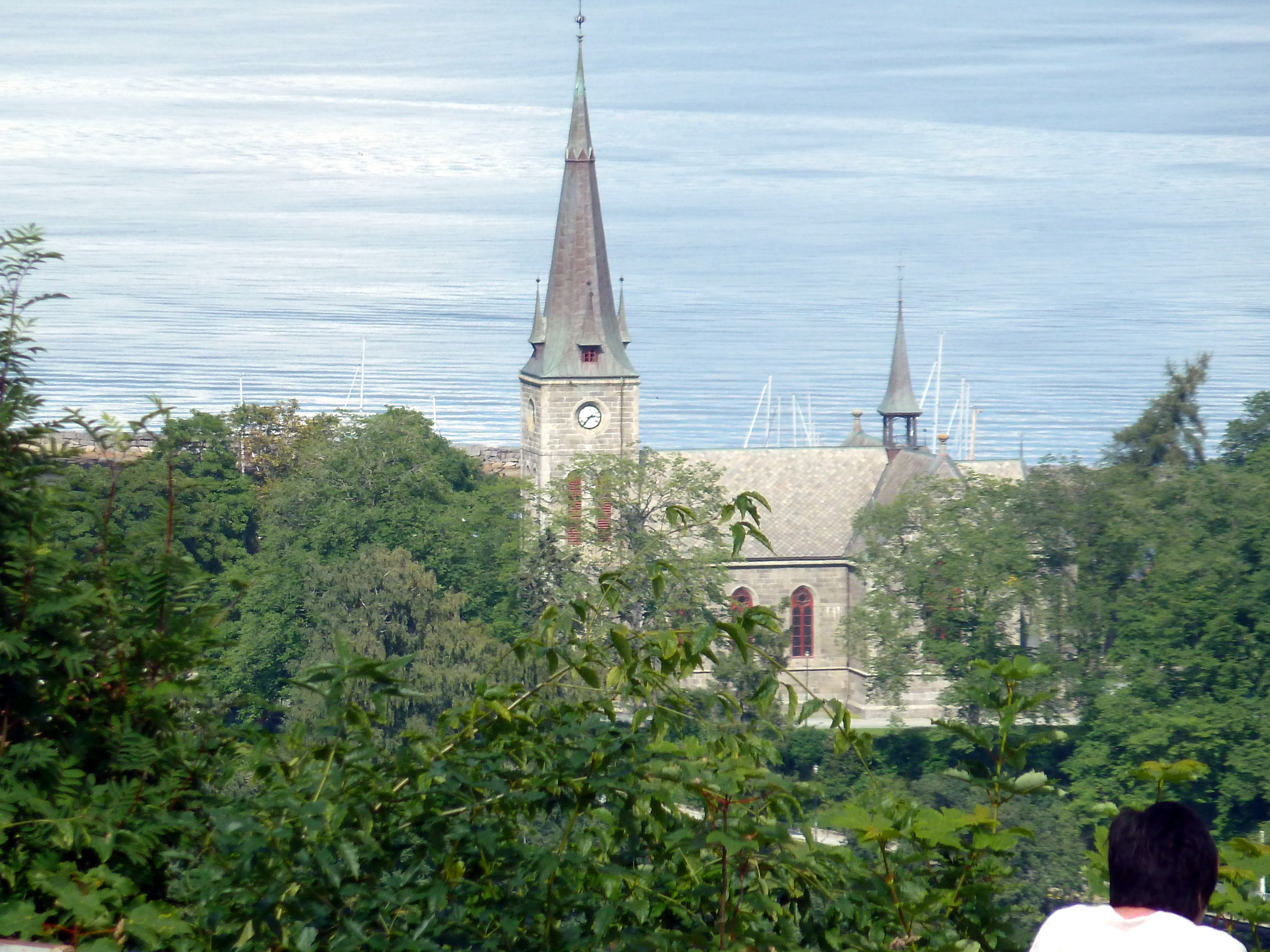

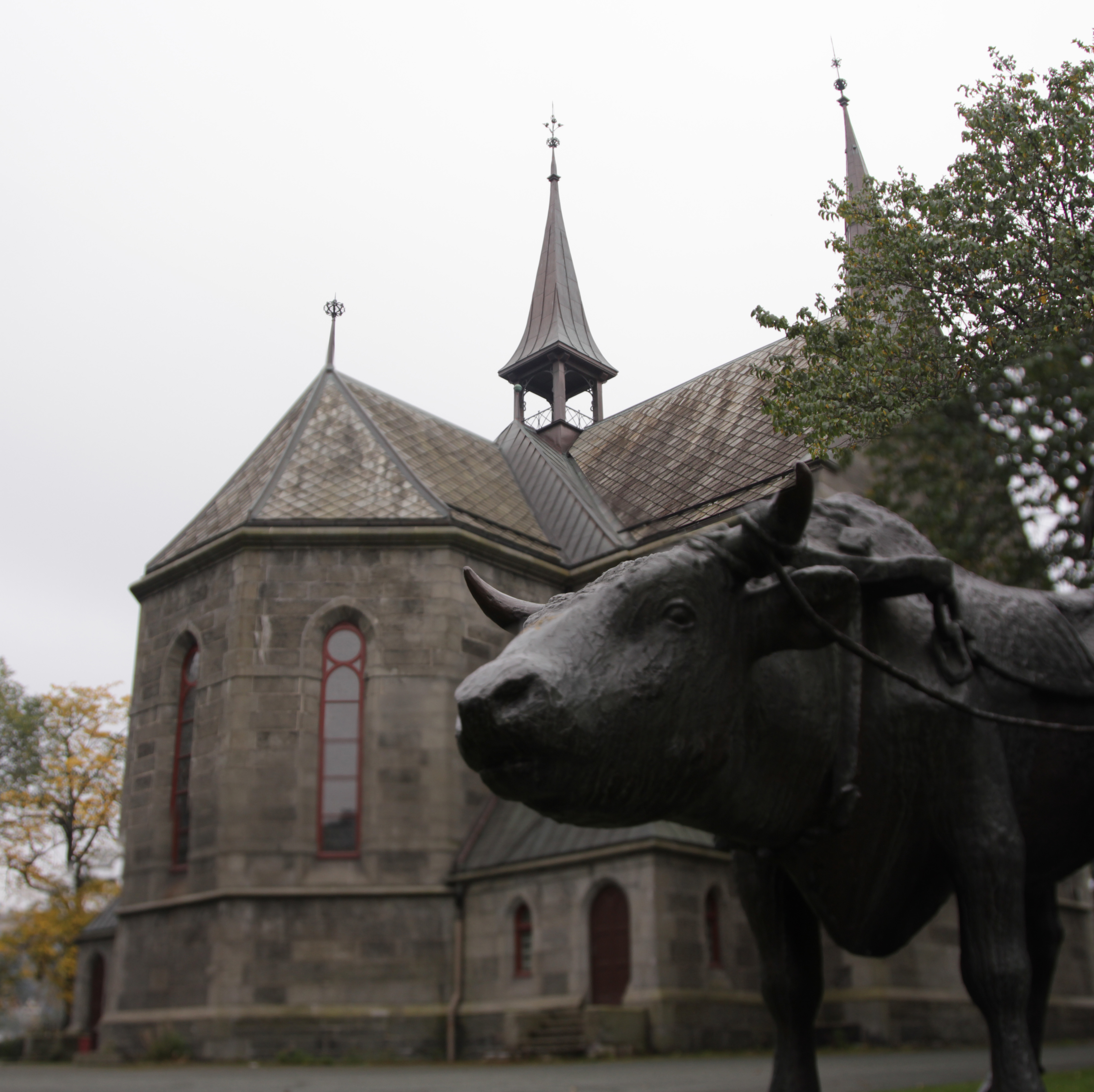

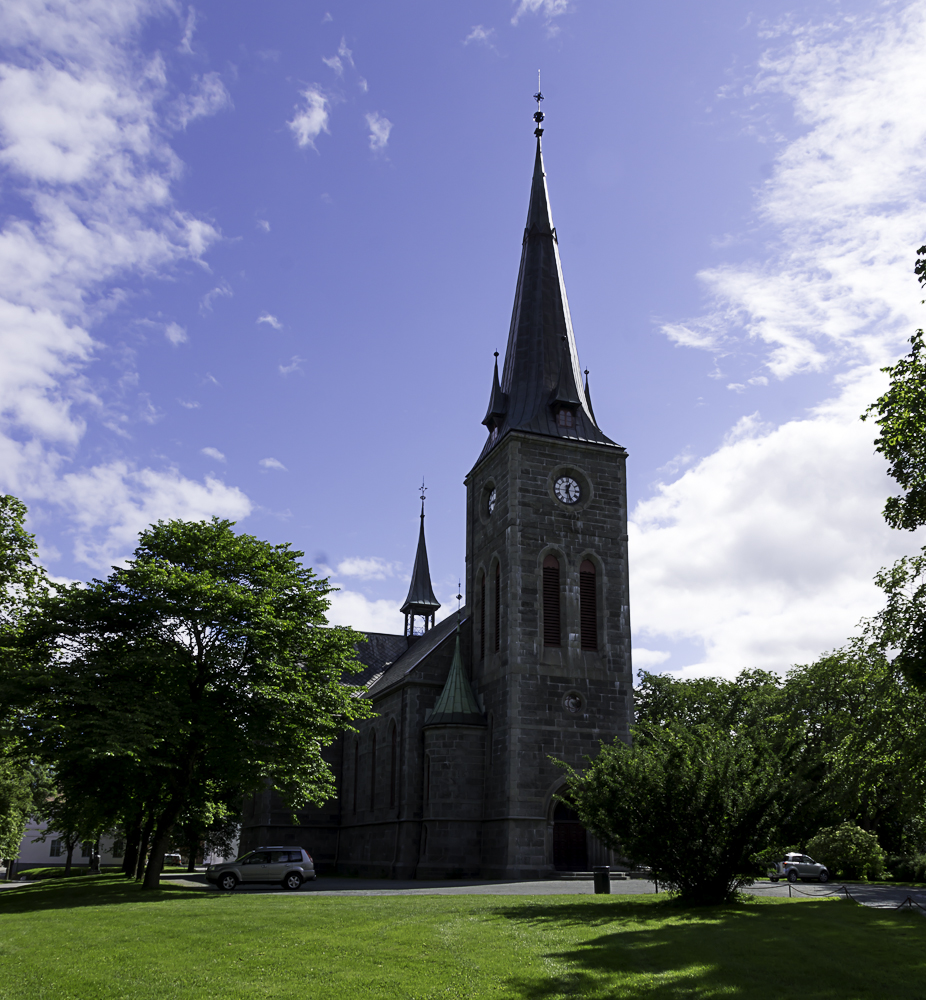

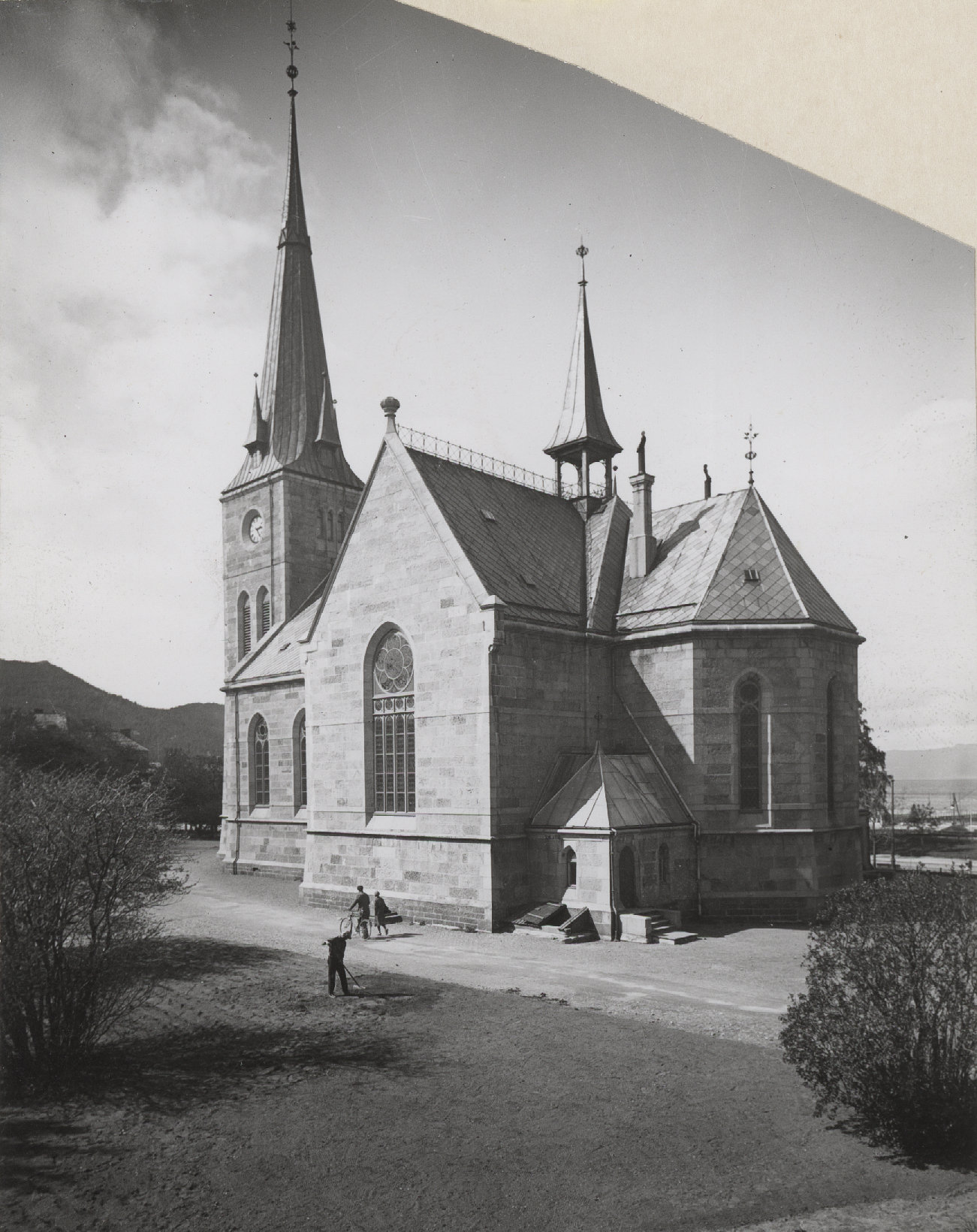

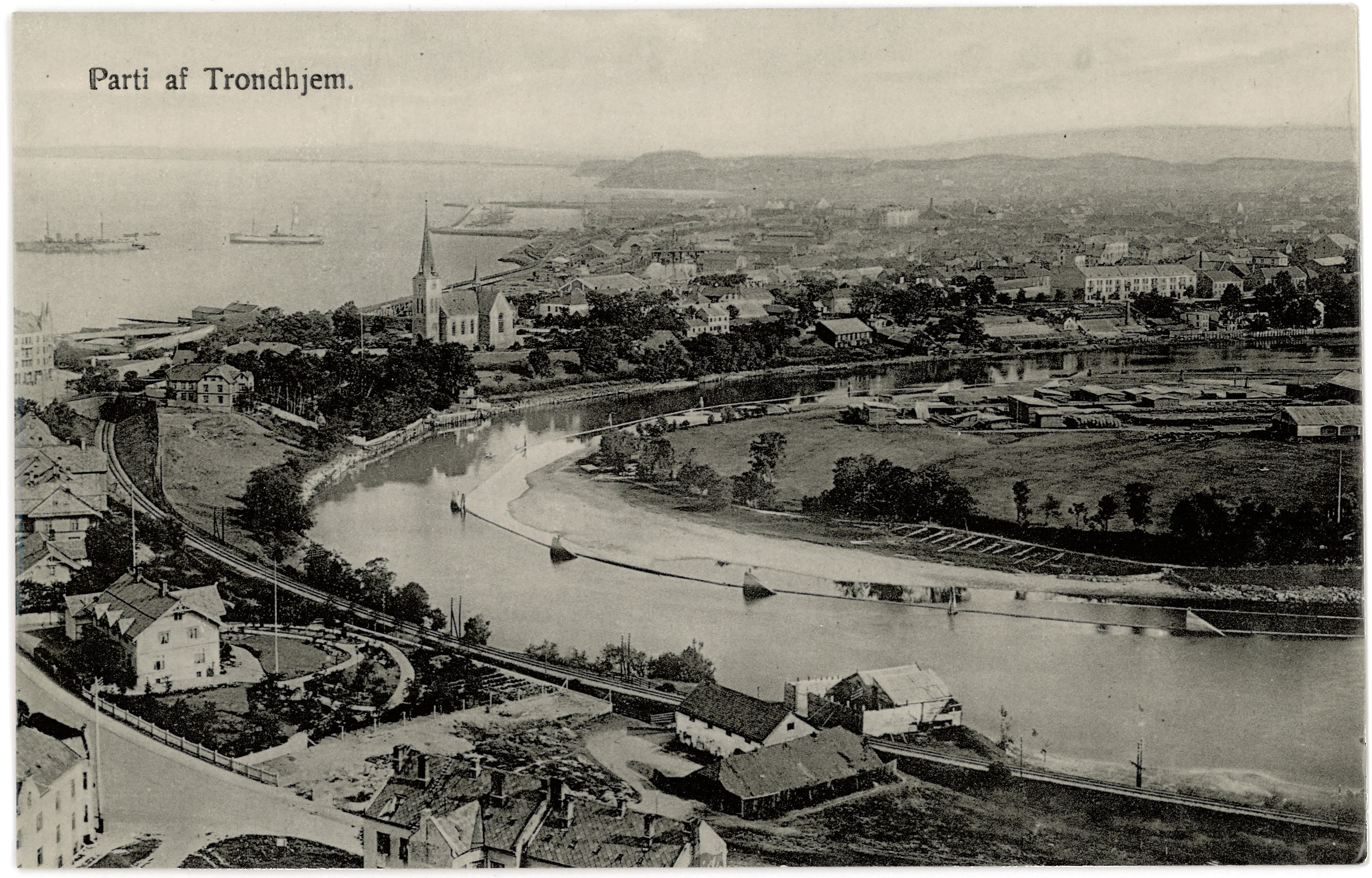

== See also ==
- List of churches in Nidaros
