= Midtbyen, Trondheim =

Borough of Trondheim, Norway

Bydel Midtbyen
- Borough
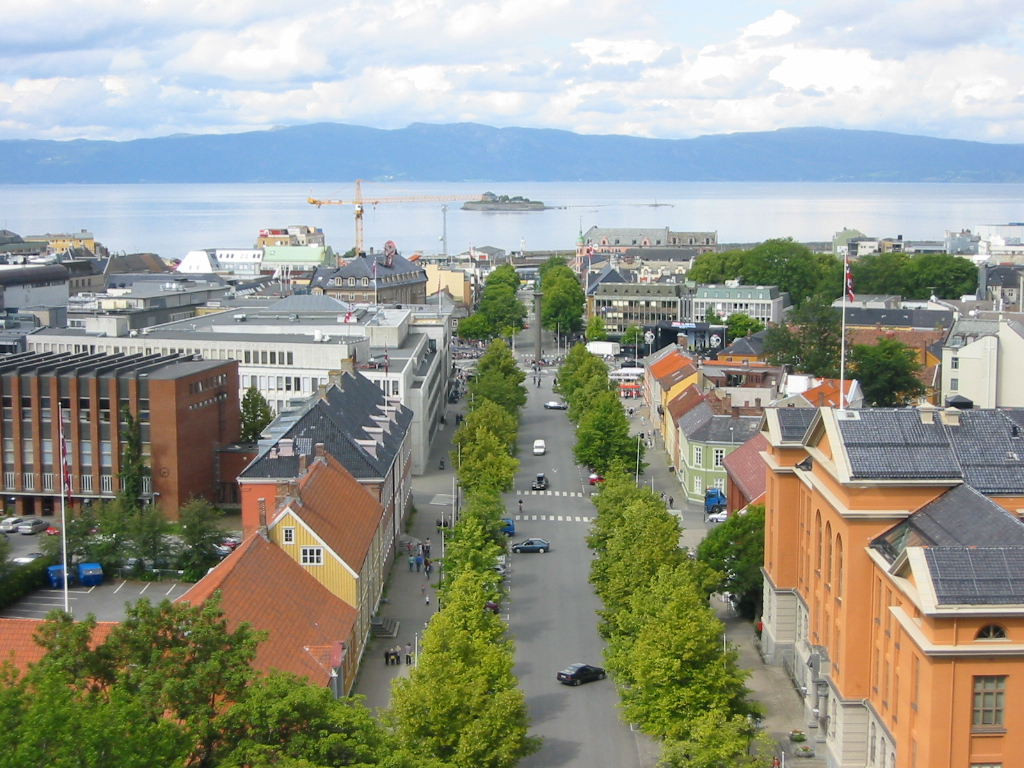
- Midtbyen as seen from Nidaros Cathedral

- Coat of arms
- Interactive map of Bydel Midtbyen
- Coordinates: 63.4311°N 10.3966°E
- Country: Norway
- Region: Central Norway
- County: Trøndelag
- Municipality: Trondheim Municipality
- City: Trondheim
- Elevation: 7 m (23 ft)
- Time zone: UTC+01:00 (CET)
  - Summer (DST): UTC+02:00 (CEST)
- Post Code: 7012 Trondheim

Midtbyen is a borough of the city of Trondheim in Trondheim Municipality in Trøndelag county, Norway. The borough comprises much of the city centre of downtown Trondheim plus part of the Bymarka rural areas to the west.

== Location ==
Midtbyen proper is located north and west of the river Nidelva, south of the Trondheim channel and east of the neighborhood of Ila, thus being north of Øya and Elgeseter, west of Bakklandet and south of Brattøra. The borough of Midtbyen also comprises areas of Ila, Byåsen, Trolla and Stavne. The city's most historic buildings and central institutions are located here. The area is primarily commercial with office buildings and retail stores, though there is also some dense housing. The westernmost part of Midtbyen is dominated by housing, while commercial interests dominate the eastern section. In the middle of Midtbyen is Trondheim Torg (Trondheim torv), a square that features a statue of the city's founder, Olav Tryggvason.

== History ==
Midtbyen dates back to the Viking Age when it started as a marketplace, in 997 according to the saga of Olav Tryggvason. It was formerly called Kaupangen i Nidaros by Olav Tryggvason and later Nidaros (Old Norse: Niðaróss). The original marketplace of Trondheim grew up around the mouth of the Nid River. In the 11th century, Nidaros was turned into the Archiepiscopate of Nidaros and for a period, until 1217, it was the capital of Norway. Midtbyen and the immediate surrounding area remained the only settled area of Trondheim until the late 19th century when the city started expanding outside the Midtbyen limits. The name Midtbyen dates back to after the merging of Trondheim with the surrounding municipalities in the 1960s.

== Transport ==
As the centre of the city, Midtbyen serves as the most important transportation hub in Trondheim. Public transport has its main hub at the intersection of Prinsens Gate and Kongens Gate, while the Trondheim Tramway terminates at St. Olavs gate. Just over the canal on Brattøra is Trondheim Central Station providing both local and express train services. In the summer there is also a ferry to Munkholmen from Ravnkloa.

== Media gallery ==
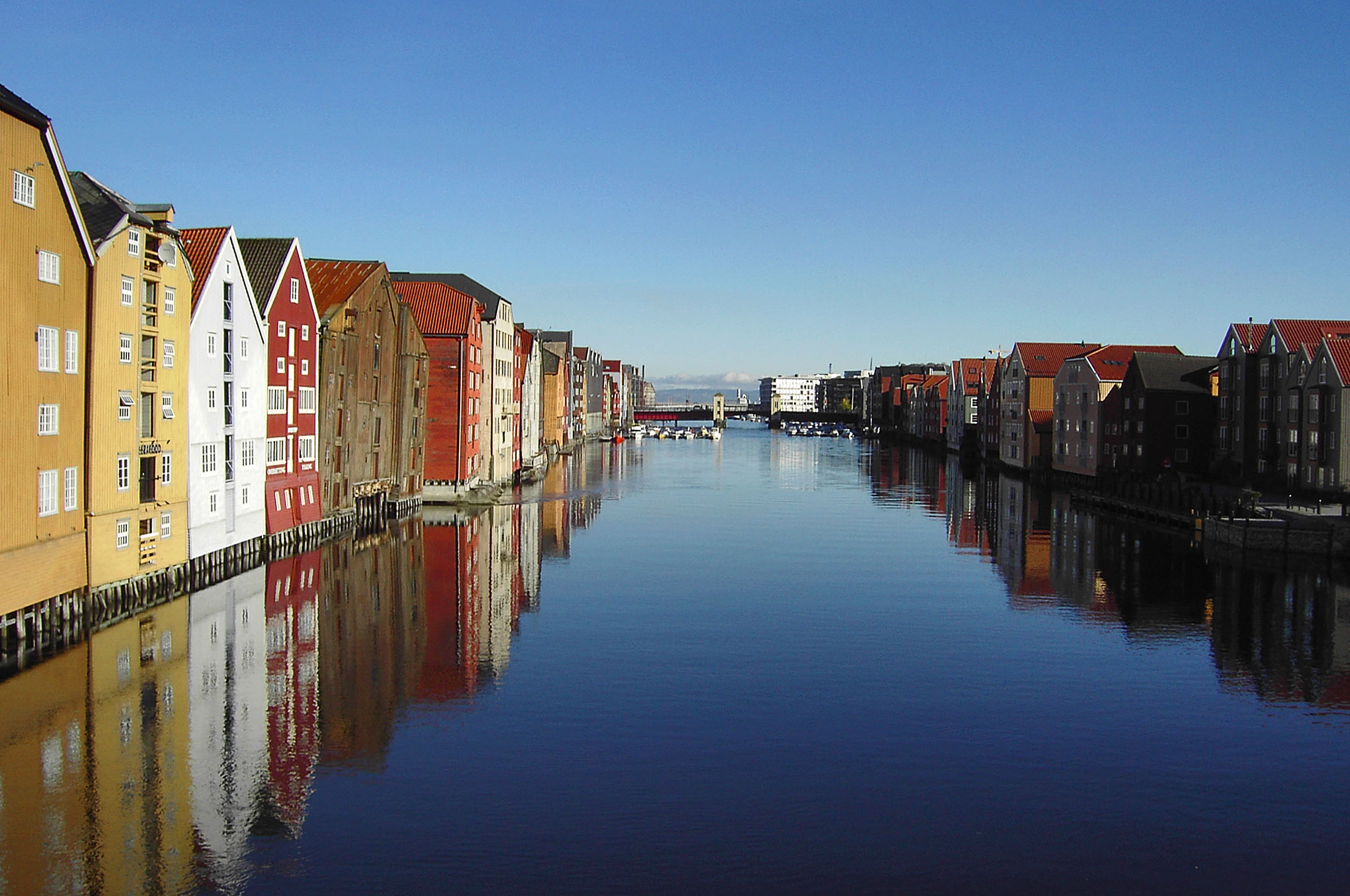
Traditional buildings along Nidelva

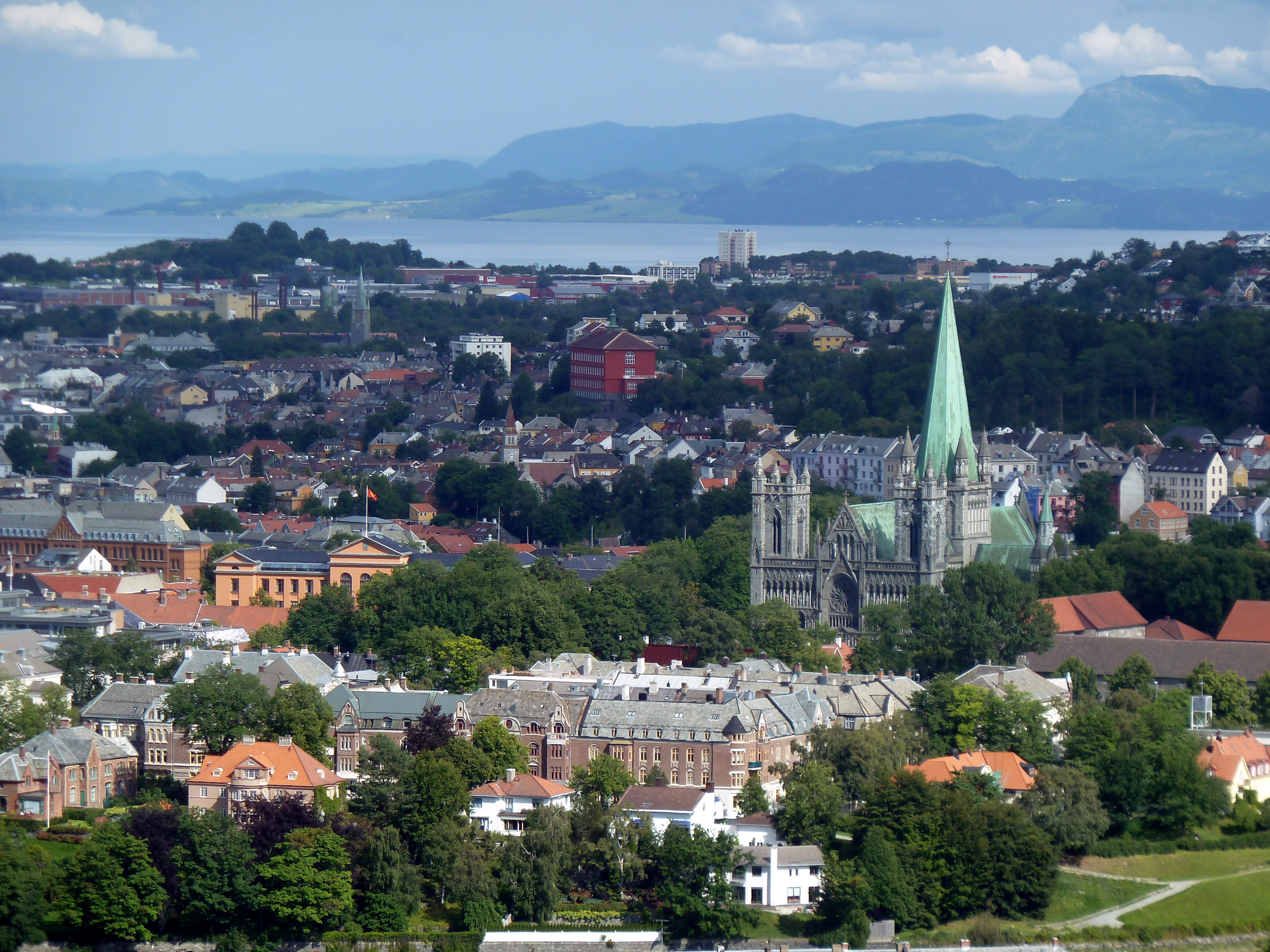
Nidaros Cathedral

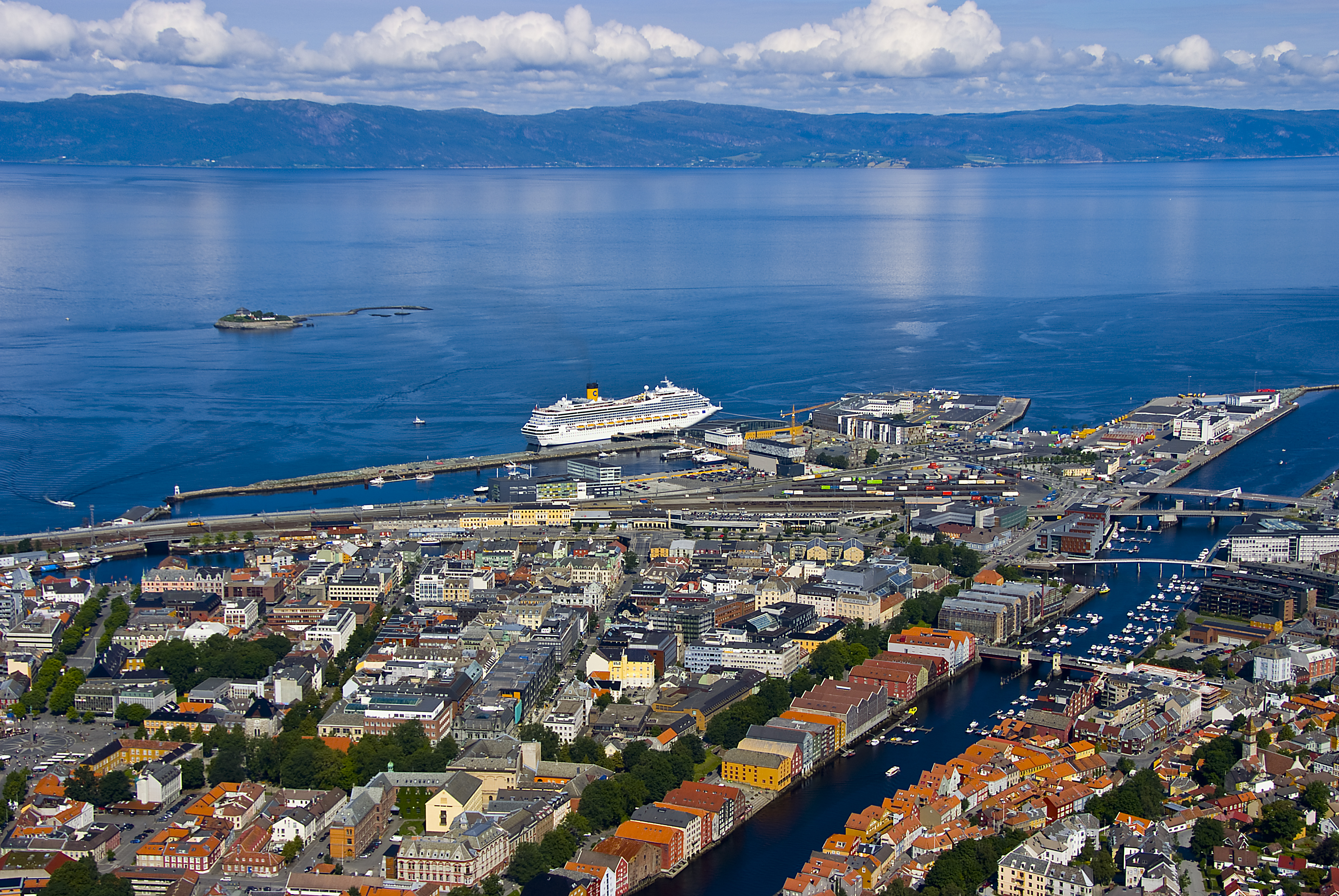
Port area

== Institutions ==
The southern part of Midtbyen is dominated by places of worship, including Nidaros Cathedral (Nidarosdomen) and the Vår Frue Church, while Kalvskinnet, the southwestern sections of Midtbyen, hosts the engineering and computer faculty of Sør-Trøndelag University College and the institute of archaeology at the Norwegian University of Science and Technology. The central area of Midtbyen is dominated by financial institutions, including the corporate headquarters of Sparebanken Midt-Norge, BNbank and Fokus Bank.

== See also ==
- List of boroughs in Trondheim prior to 2005
