= St. Olavs Gate tram stop =

Tram stop in Midtbyen, Trondheim, Norway

St. Olavs Gate
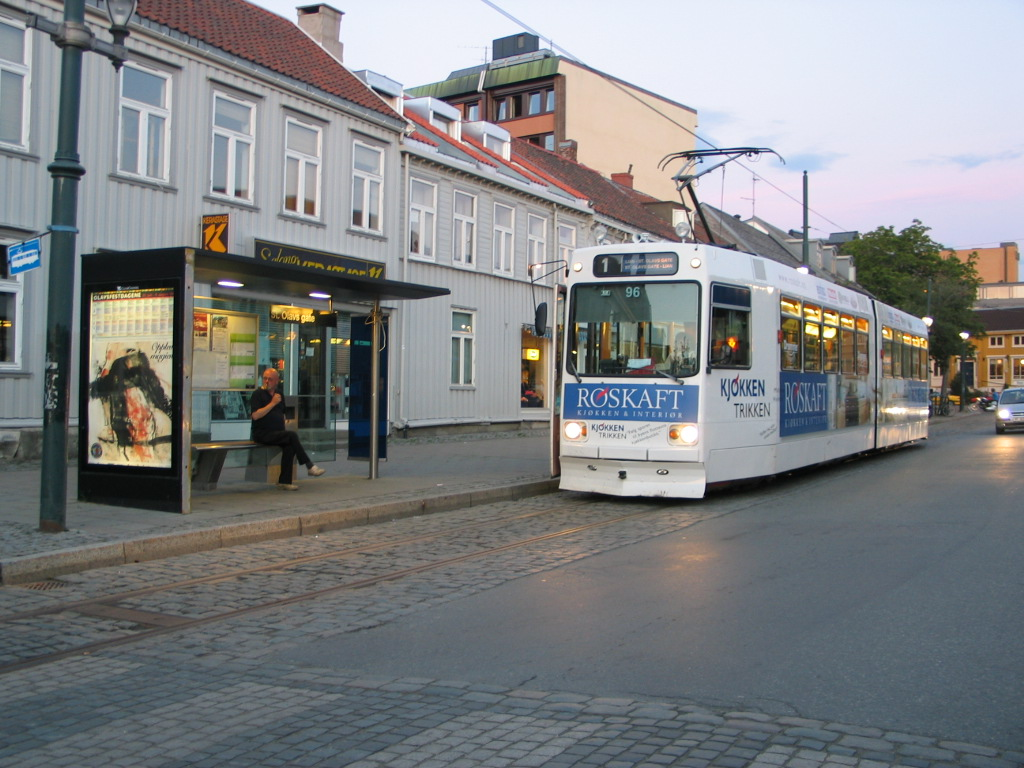
- A tram entering St. Olavs Gate

General information
- Location: Midtbyen
- Coordinates: 63°25′52″N 10°23′25″E
- Line: Gråkallbanen
- Connections: Munkegata Terminal (Bus)

History
- Opened: 1924
Location

St. Olavs Gate in Trondheim, Norway is the location of the terminal station of Gråkallbanen, the only remaining tramline in Trondheim. The station serves the city center and is located two blocks from the bus station at Munkegata Terminal. It is located on St. Olavs Gate between Kongens Gate and Dronningens Gate.

The station was built in 1924 and first served as the terminus for the private Gråkallbanen. Until 1946 the trams had to change direction at St. Olavs Gate, but that year a loop was built at the station so the trams could continue on without changing direction. Until 1966, passengers were not allowed on or off along the tram line they shared with the city owned Trondheim Sporvei. The operation of the tram was taken over by Trondheim Trafikkselskap in 1974. From 1973 the line continued on to Voldsminde and later in the 1980s to Lade, and did not stop at St. Olavs Gate. After Gråkallbanen was reopened in 1990, St. Olavs Gate station again became the terminus for the line.

Preceding station	Trondheim Tramway	Following station
Hospitalskirka towards Lian	Gråkallbanen	Terminus

== See also ==
- Boreal Bane
- Trondheim Tramway
