= Bymarka =

Park in Trondheim, Norway

Coordinates: 63°24′N 10°15′E

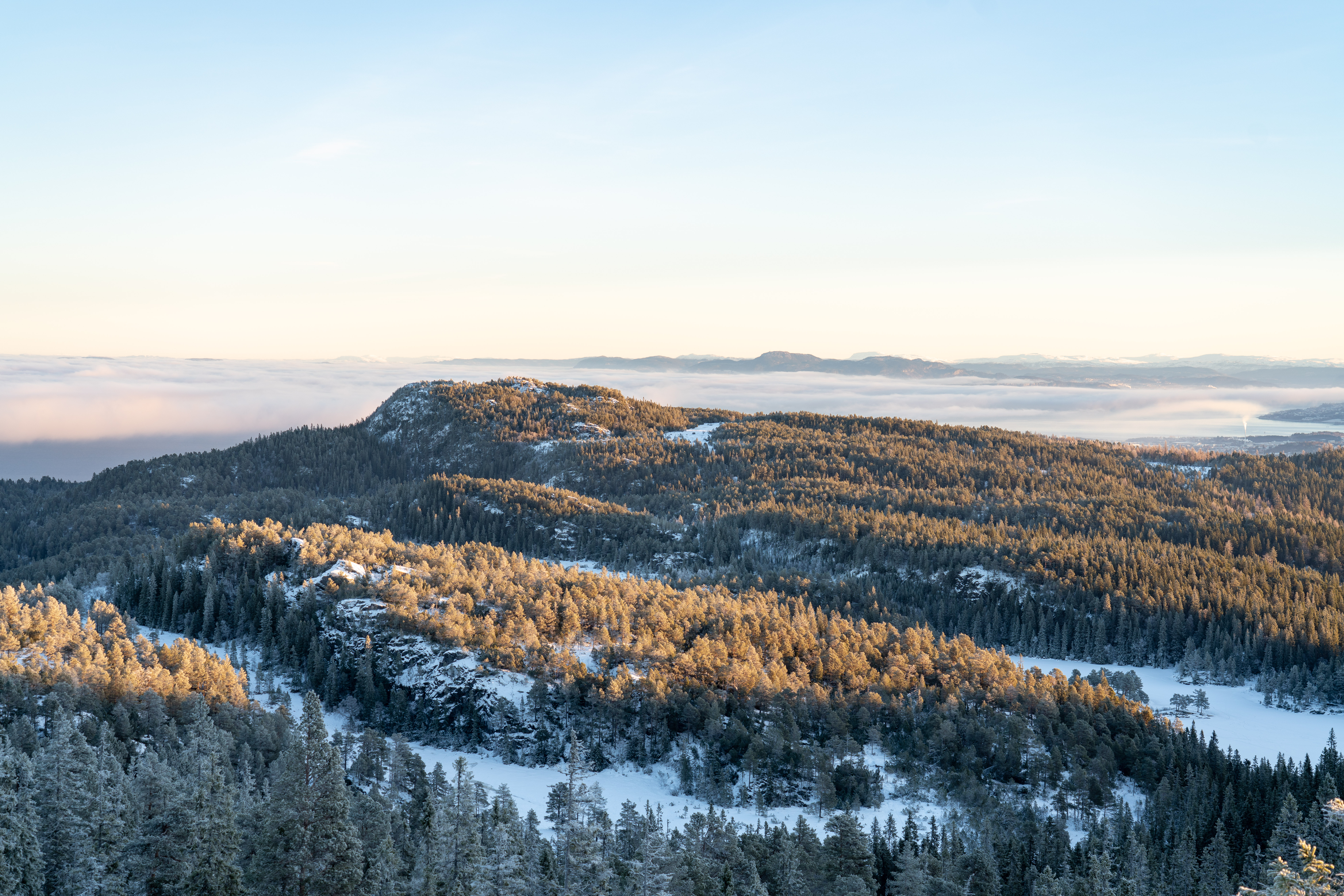
Geitfjellet mountain seen from Gråkallen

Bymarka is a large park and nature reserve on the west side of the city of Trondheim in the western part of Trondheim Municipality in Trøndelag county, Norway.

== Location and use ==
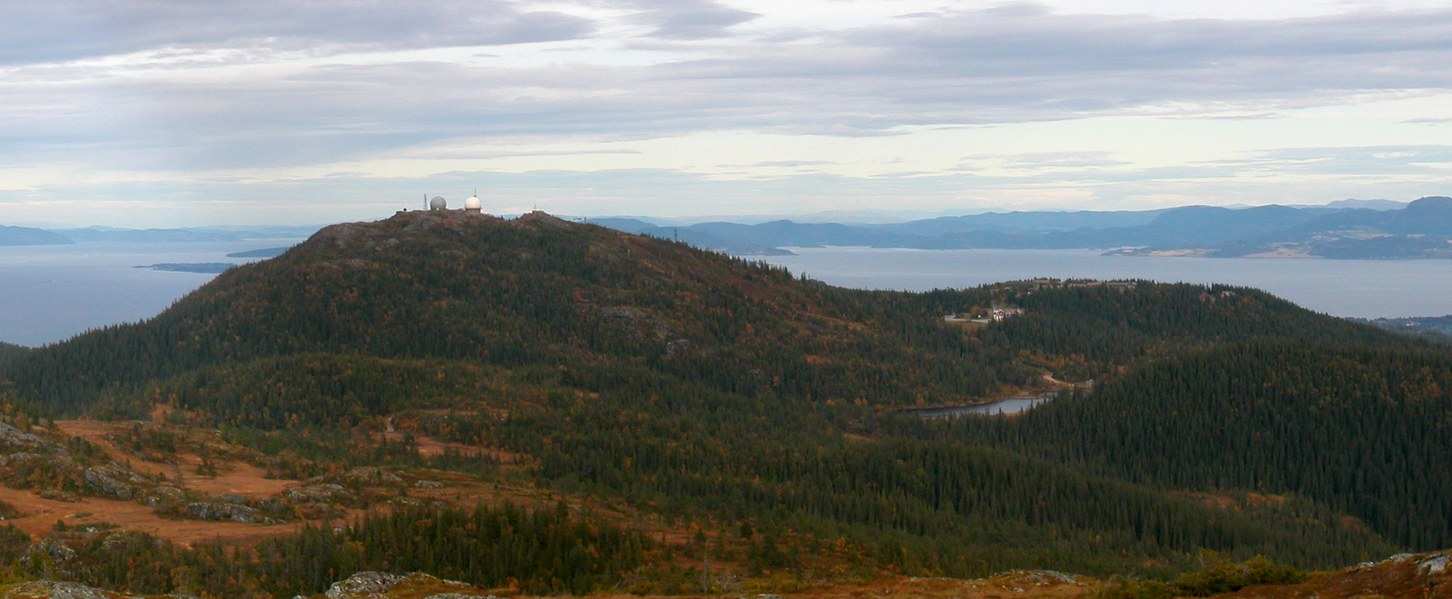
Gråkallen mountain seen from Storheia.

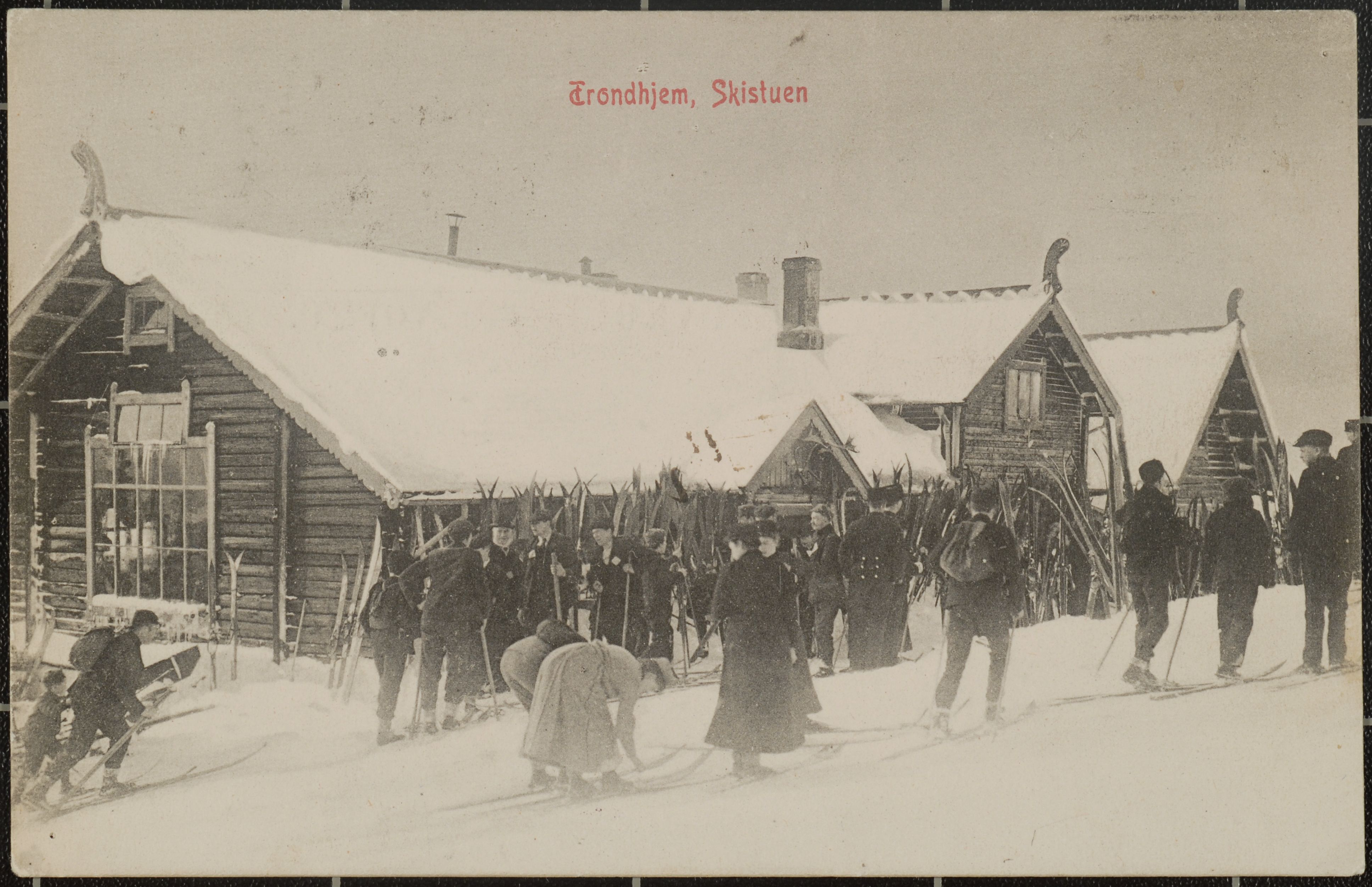
Cross country skiing has for a long time been popular among the Trondheim population. There are several staffed cafees in traditional cabin style in Bymarka.

Bymarka is situated to the west of the city center and has an area of 80 square kilometres (31 sq mi), with more than 200 kilometres (120 mi) of walking tracks. Bymarka is very popular for cross-country skiing in the winter, and for walks, hiking or jogging in the summer. There is a golf course on the fringe near the city. Bymarka borders the Byåsen district, and can be reached by the Gråkall Line tram line or by car.

== Forests and habitats ==
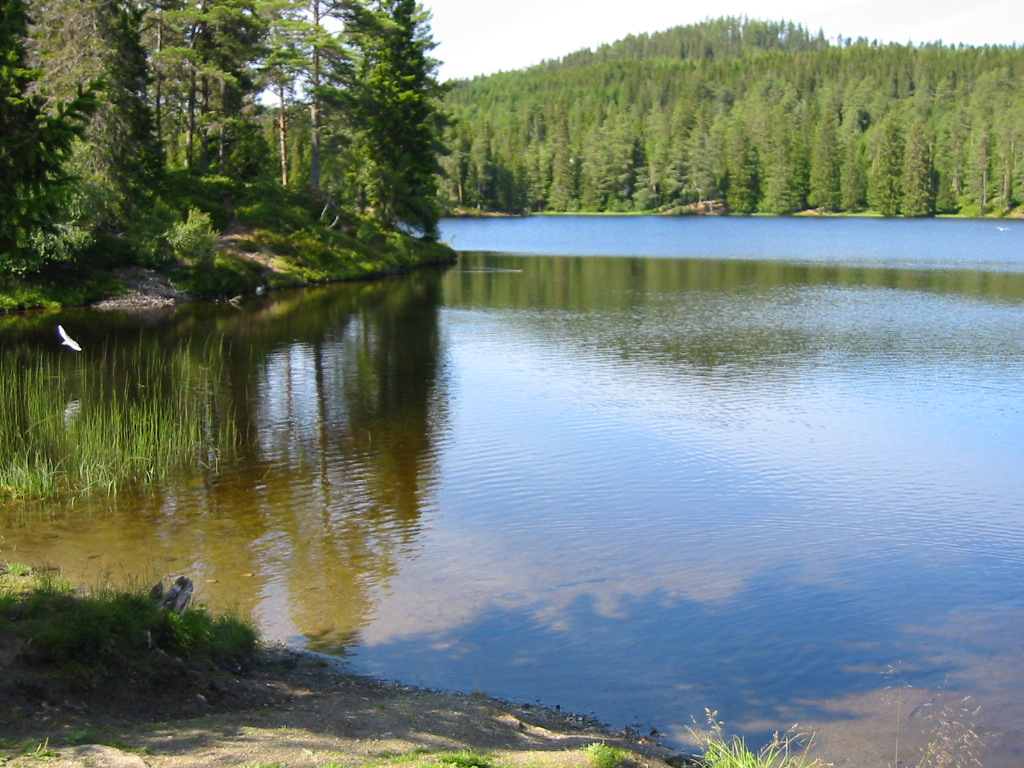
Baklidammen in July.

The elevation in Bymarka is from 200 to 565 metres (656 to 1,854 ft) above sea level, except in the hilly northern part, which reaches down to the Trondheimsfjord. There are more than 10 lakes, and many bogs. However, Bymarka is largely covered with forest, much of it planted between the years 1870 and 1940. Some non-native trees were planted, such as European Larch and Douglas fir, and there is also Sycamore maple and European ash at the lowest elevations. The most common tree species are the native Norway spruce, Scots pine and Downy birch. Storheia, Bosbergheia, and Gråkallen are mountains that reach above the treeline (which is at approx 500 metres (1,600 ft) above sea level) and have some alpine vegetation. As there are no higher mountains nearby, there is a nice view over Trondheim, the fjord, and mountain ranges including Trollheimen to the south and Sylane (which is partly in Sweden) to the east.

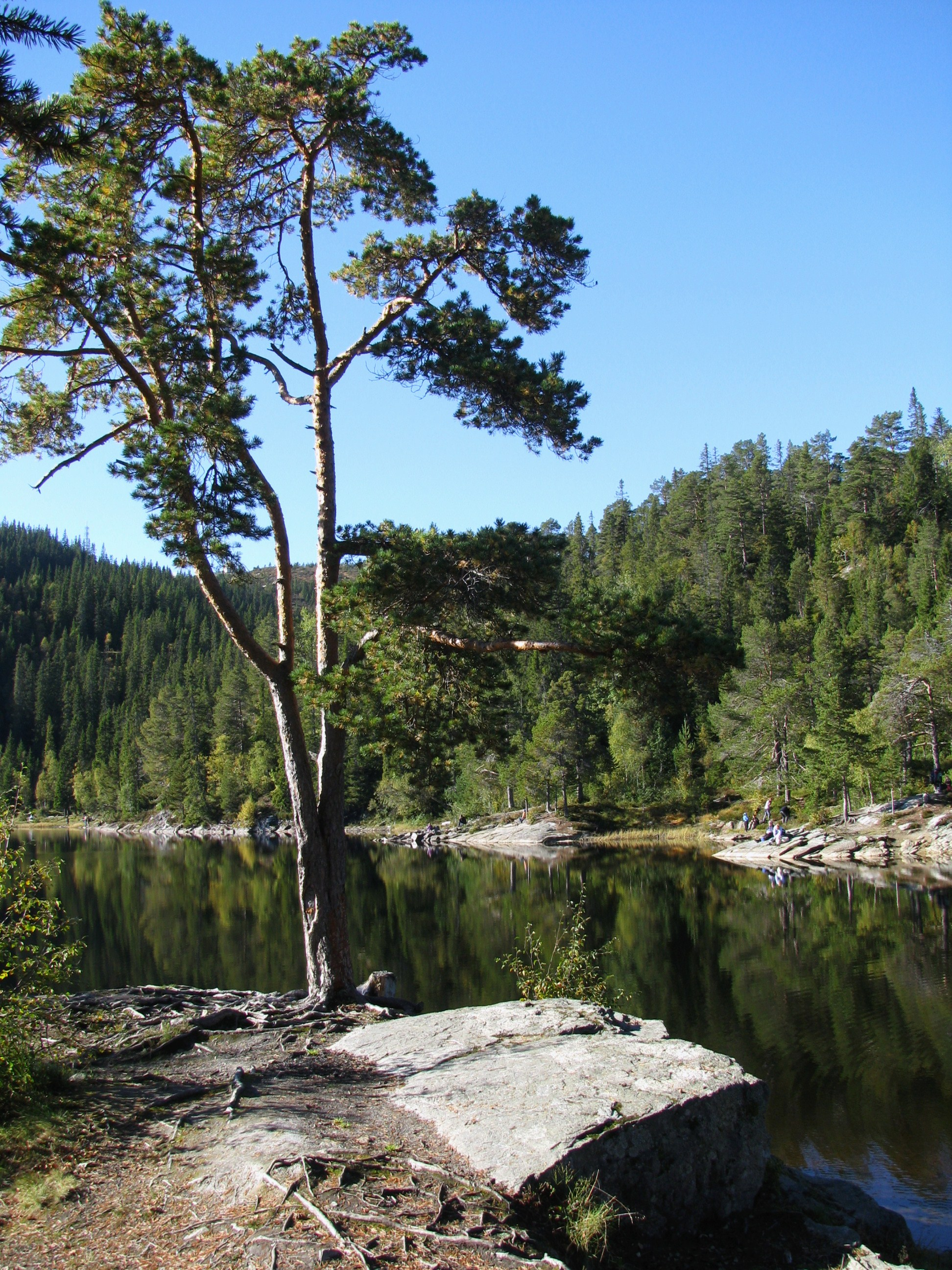
Autumn near a lake in Bymarka

Part of the northern area of Bymarka is protected and preserved as a nature reserve, stretching from an elevation of around 450 metres (1,480 ft) near Herbernheia and northwards down towards the fjord. This reserve therefore includes several vegetation zones: North boreal (above 400 metres (1,300 ft) above sea level), middle boreal (200 to 400 metres (660 to 1,310 ft), the most common in Bymarka) and southern boreal (below 200 metres (660 ft)), the latter zone is rare among protected areas as it is heavily used for farming in Norway. The lowland on the southern (Gaulosen) and western (Byneset) fringes of Bymarka contains areas of more southern hemiboreal vegetation. One of these locations has an especially rich understory, and has traditionally been used by the locals for collecting plants believed to have medical properties, hence the name Apoteket (The Pharmacy).

== Fauna ==
Moose, red fox, hare and squirrel are the most common animals, but there are also healthy populations of roe deer, beaver, badger and also some otters. As of spring 2006, even one wolverine has been verified as living in Bymarka, which is rare, as this elusive predator usually stays in the higher mountains, far from any cities. There are trout in many lakes, and a rich bird life.

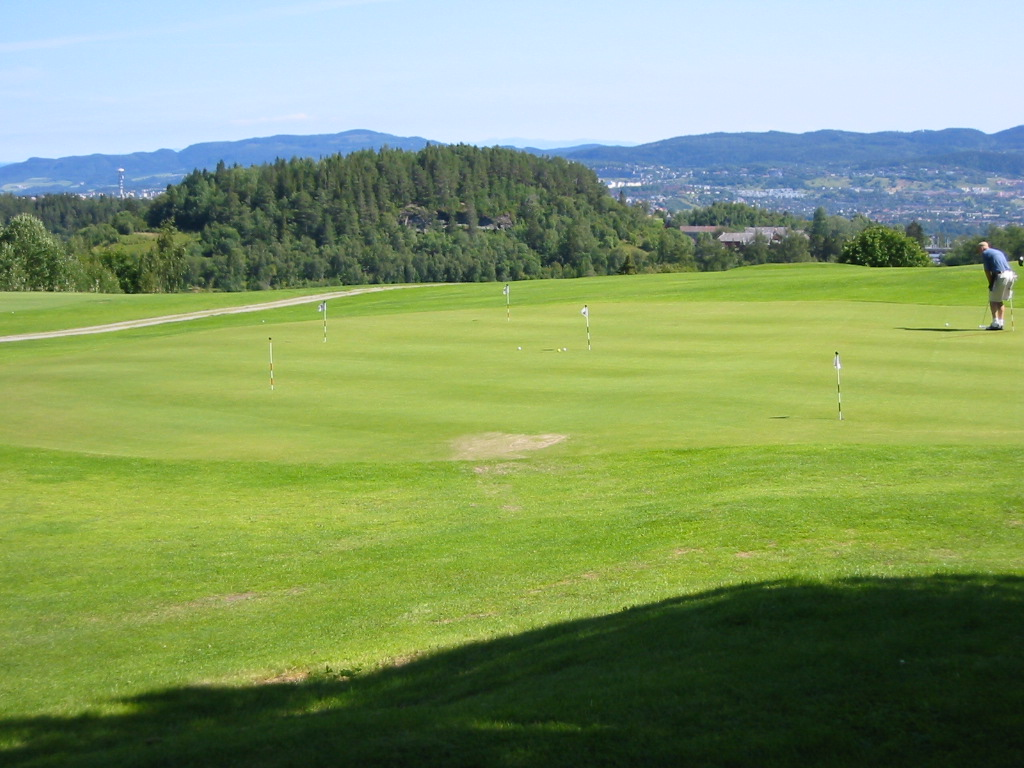
The golf course in Bymarka.
