= Hell–Sunnan Line =

Railway line in Norway

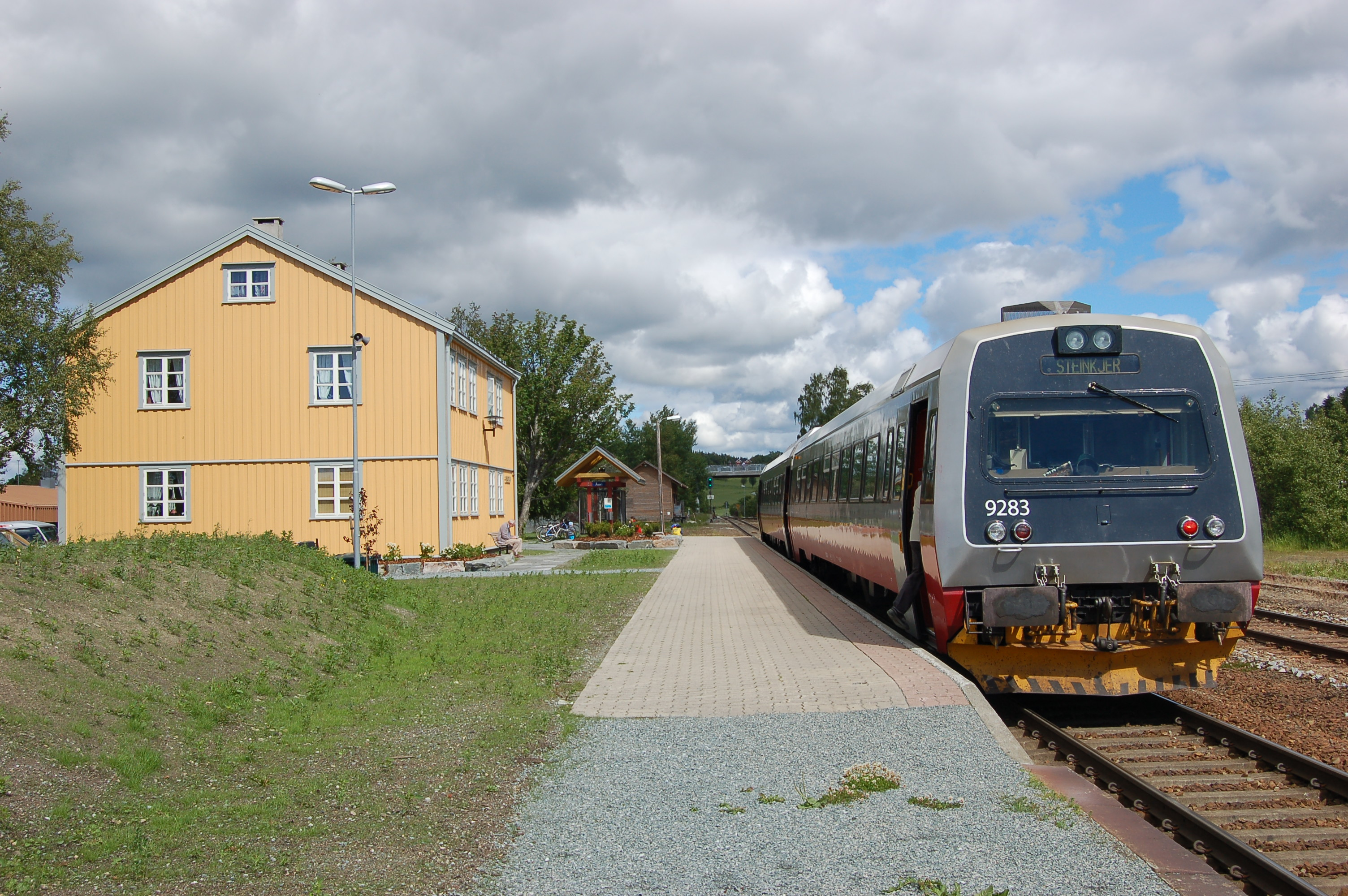
- NSB Class 92 train at Åsen Station

Overview
- Native name: Hell–Sunnanbanen
- Owner: Bane NOR
- Termini: Hell Station; Sunnan Station

Service
- Type: Railway
- System: Rail transport in Norway
- Operator(s): SJ Norge; CargoNet; Cargolink

History
- Opened: 1 February 1902 (to Stjørdal); 15 November 1905 (to Sunnan)

Technical
- Line length: 105 km (65 mi)
- Num of tracks: Single
- Track gauge: 1,435 mm (4 ft 8 1/2 in)
- Electrification: No

The Hell–Sunnan Line (Norwegian: Hell–Sunnanbanen) is a 105-kilometer-long (65 mi) railway line between Hell (in Stjørdal Municipality) and Sunnan (in Steinkjer Municipality) in Trøndelag county, Norway. The name is no longer in official use and the line is now considered part of the Nordland Line. The Hell–Sunnan Line branches from the Meråker Line at Hell and runs on the east shore of the Trondheimsfjord passing through Stjørdal Municipality, Levanger Municipality, Verdal Municipality, Inderøy Municipality, and Steinkjer Municipality.

The Norwegian State Railways (NSB) started construction in 1899 and the first part of the line, from Hell to Stjørdalshalsen, opened on 1 February 1902. The railway opened to Levanger on 29 October 1902, to Verdalsøra on 1 November 1904 and to Sunnan on 15 November 1905. Sunnan was chosen as terminus because of its location on the southern end of the lake of Snåsavatnet. The line was further extended to Snåsa in 1926, after which it has been classified as part of the Nordland Line. The railway is the most heavily trafficked non-electrified line in Norway, with the Trøndelag Commuter Rail running south of Steinkjer. It is also used by intercity passenger and freight trains.

== Route ==
Map of the Hell–Sunnan Line

The Hell–Sunnan Line constitutes the section of the Nordland Line between Hell, Stjørdal and Sunnan, Steinkjer. At the time of the line's opening, it was 105.2 kilometers (65.4 mi) long. The railway is single track, standard gauge, non-electrified, and equipped with centralized traffic control, partial automatic train control, and GSM-R. The railway line is owned and maintained by the Norwegian National Rail Administration.

Starting in the south at Hell Station, which is located 31.54 kilometers (19.60 mi) from Trondheim Central Station (Trondheim S), the Meråker Line branches from the Nordland Line. The latter crosses the river of Stjørdalselva on a 149-meter-long (489 ft) truss bridge. It passes the closed Sandferhus Station before reaching Trondheim Airport Station (33.17 km or 20.61 mi from Trondheim S), which serves as an airport rail link and is situated below the terminal of Trondheim Airport, Værnes. Previously there was a 3-kilometer-long (1.9 mi) spur from Sandferhus to Værnes and Øyanmoen. The mainline continues under the airport's taxiway and runway in the two Værnes Tunnels, the latter which is 150 meters (490 ft) long, after which the line reaches Stjørdal Station (34.67 km or 21.54 mi).

The line continues past the closed Vold Station, which was built to serve a mill, to Skatval, through which the line makes a semi-circular detour. Here it serves Skatval Station (41.90 km or 26.04 mi) and the closed Alstad Station. Alstad was previously an important station as it was conveniently placed for boat access from Frosta Municipality. Located at 89.6 meters (294 ft) above mean sea level (AMSL), it was the highest elevated station on the line. The line then enters the municipality of Levanger, where it first reaches the closed Langstein Station and then the closed Vudu Station. After Vudu, the line reaches its highest elevation of 99 meters (325 ft) when it crosses over European Road 6 (E6). The line then reaches Åsen Station (61.40 km or 38.15 mi) before continuing past the closed Hammerberg Station to Ronglan Station (69.65 km or 43.28 mi).

Before reaching Skogn Station (76.01 km or 47.23 mi), a 2.8-kilometer-long (1.7 mi) spur branches off to Fiborgtangen, serving Norske Skog Skogn. The mainline continues past Eggen Station and over the E6, past the closed Sykehuset Levanger Station, which served Levanger Hospital, before reaching Levanger Station (83.90 km or 52.13 mi). It then crosses the river Levangselva on a 27.4-meter-long (90 ft) bridge. It passes the closed Elberg Station and to reach HiNT Station (69.65 km or 43.28 mi), which serves the Levanger campus of Nord-Trøndelag University College.

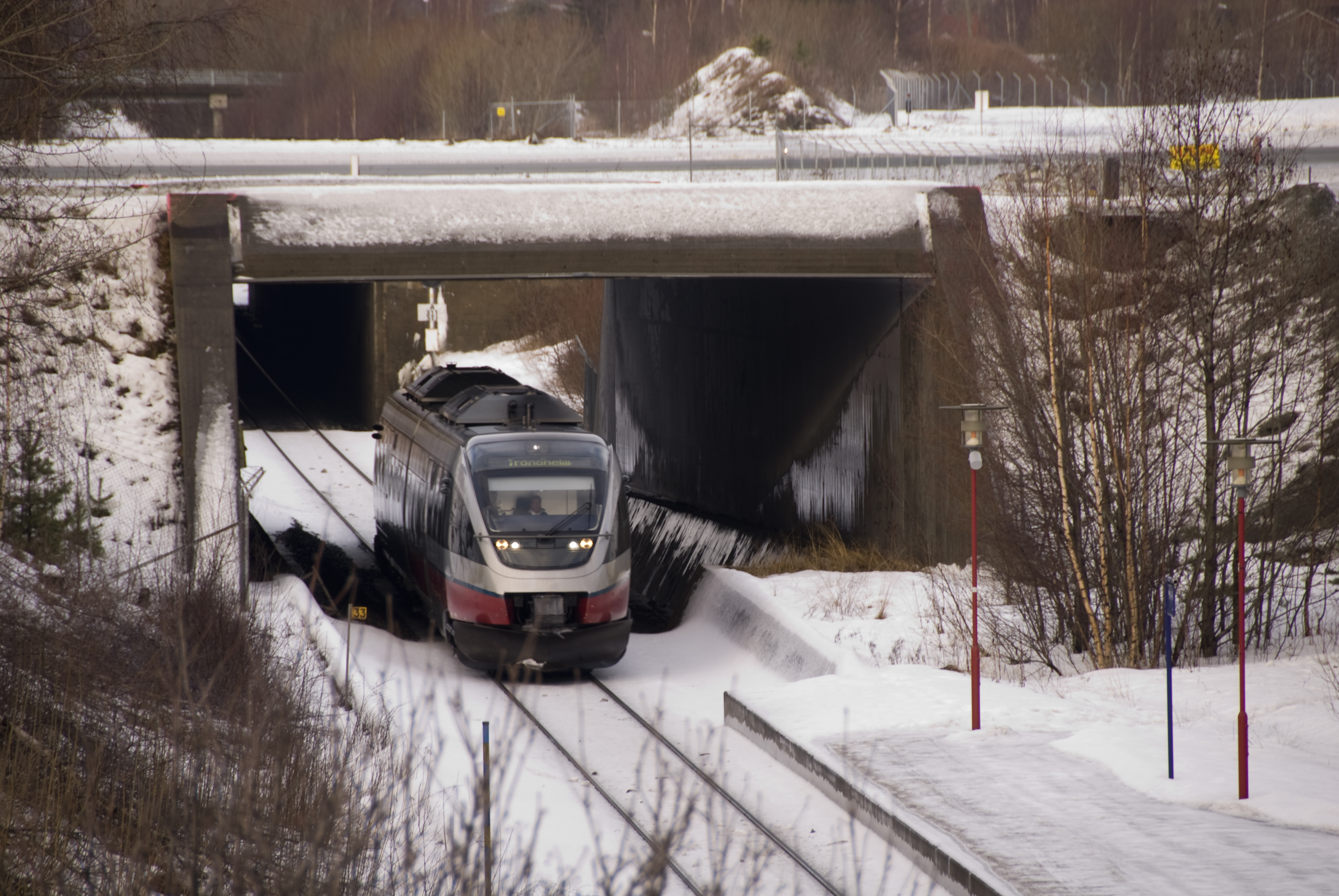
Class 93 train passing through the Værnes Tunnel under Trondheim Airport, Værnes' taxiway

The line continues past the closed Østborg Station and Rinnan Station before entering the municipality of Verdal. After Bergsgrav Station (93.70 km or 58.22 mi), which serves the neighborhood of Vinne, a spur branches off to Verdal's industrial area. The mainline crosses the river of Verdalselva on a 210-meter-long (690 ft) truss bridge before reaching Verdal Station (96.23 km or 59.79 mi). It is followed by the closed Fleskhus Station and Bjørga Station before entering the municipality of Inderøy at the 103-meter-long (338 ft) Koabjørgen Tunnel. The only station in Inderøy is Røra Station (105.47 km or 65.54 mi); however the line does not enter Steinkjer before passing through the 385-meter-long (1,263 ft) Lunnan Tunnel.

After passing the closed Vollan Station, the line reaches Sparbu Station (112.93 km or 70.17 mi). It then passes the closed Mære Station and Vist Station and crosses over the 46-meter (151 ft) bridge over Figgja to reach Steinkjer Station (125.50 km or 77.98 mi). The line runs over the river of Steinkjerelva on a 96-meter-long (315 ft) truss bridge. Then come two spurs, to Eggebogen and Byafossen. The line continues past the closed Byafossen Station and Fossemvatnet Station and terminates at the closed Sunnan Station (1,136.66 km or 706.29 mi). The Nordland Line continues over a bridge across Snåsavatnet.

== History ==
=== Planning ===
Planning of a railway to connect Trøndelag and Jämtland, Sweden, started in 1869, with one of the proposals being to build a line from Trondheim via Verdal to Sweden. However, surveys along the Verdal proposed route deemed it unsuitable, and instead the line was built via Stjørdalen and Meråker. To conform with Swedish standards, the line was built with standard gauge instead of the in Norway more common narrow gauge. The Meråker Line opened on 22 July 1882.

In Stjørdal, controversy arose over the route. The river of Stjørdalselva creates a barrier just north of Hell, which made it cheaper to build the line on the south shore of the river to Hegra. However, the major population center was located at Stjørdalshalsen, on the north shore of the river. Locally, there were many protests against the line bypassing such a large town, but the cost of the bridge made Parliament choose the southern alternative. This gave residents in the town a 3-kilometre (1.9 mi) route to the train, since they had to cross the river to get access to the railway. This decreased the railway's ability to compete with the steam ships and thus the overall profitability of the line. With the arrival of the railway, transport to Trondheim became much easier than to Stjørdalshalsen and Levanger, helping Trondheim grow as a regional center.

The Nordland Line was first publicly proposed by Ole Tobias Olsen in a letter to the editor in Morgenbladet in 1872, where he argued for a railway between Trondheim and his home county of Nordland. The same year, Nord-Trøndelag County Council voted in favor to start planning of a railway between Trondheim and Namsos. The county council appointed a railway committee in 1875, who on 23 August 1876 published a report to encourage national authorities to consider the line, which resulted in surveying starting in 1877. On 27 April 1881, the committee made its recommendation to the county council and ceased its work. No planning was done the next three years, until three county councilors, Vilhelm Andreas Wexelsen, Peter Theodor Holst and Bernhard Øverland, made a new proposal. However, it was not until 1889 that the county council appointed a new railway committee, which was led by Wexelsen.

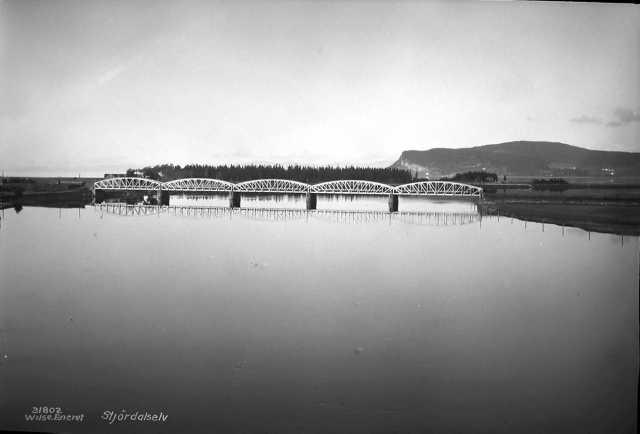
Stjørdalselva Bridge in 1927

In 1891, the county's road committee, led by Øverland, sent an official request to the railway committee, asking for details about their plans, so the appropriate roads could be planned. This spurred the committees work and a cooperation with Nordland County Council was initiated to increase the projects priority by national politicians. On 2 March 1896, with 87 against 27 votes, Parliament passed legislation approving a railway from Hell to Sunnan. Costs were estimated at 8.75 million Norwegian krone (NOK), of which 15 percent was to be financed with local grants and the remainder by the state. Construction was scheduled to take 15 years. The decision initially called for the railway to be built in two stages, with the split at Rinnan in Levanger—the site of the military camp Rinnleiret. Final approval of construction was made by Parliament on 11 June 1898.

=== Construction ===
At Hell, there arose a disagreement about where the Hell–Sunnan Line should branch from the Meråker Line. Initial proposals were to place the branch from a location before Hell Station, thus forcing trains to back up from Hell Station before continuing northwards. The station building at Hell was also too small for the increased traffic, so it was moved to Sunnan Station and a new station building, with capacity for 25 employees, was built at Hell. In Skatval, there was a controversy as to whether the station should be built at Mæhre or Alstad. Mæhre (later Skatval) had support from the municipal council and was closer to the larger share of the area's population. However, the military wanted Alstad, as it was a rally point for the military in case of a Swedish invasion, and gave easy waterway access from Frosta. The station was placed at Mæhre, while a passing loop was built at Alstad.

The most difficult work was through Grubbåsen, near Åsen. The ground consisted of quick clay, which the railway was to pass through in a trench. On 5 May 1900, a landslide filled the trench, killing three navvies. Past the lake of Nesvannet, there was also weak soil mechanics, resulting in the need for piling. One worker was killed after getting hit by a piling log. In Levanger, there was debate as to whether the station should be on the west or east side of the tracks, with the decision falling on the west side. The 3.0-kilometer-long (1.9 mi) section from Hell to Stjørdal started revenue service on 1 February 1902. The 49.4-kilometer-long (30.7 mi) section from Stjørdalshalsen to Levanger was officially opened on 27 October 1902, with ordinary services starting on 29 October.

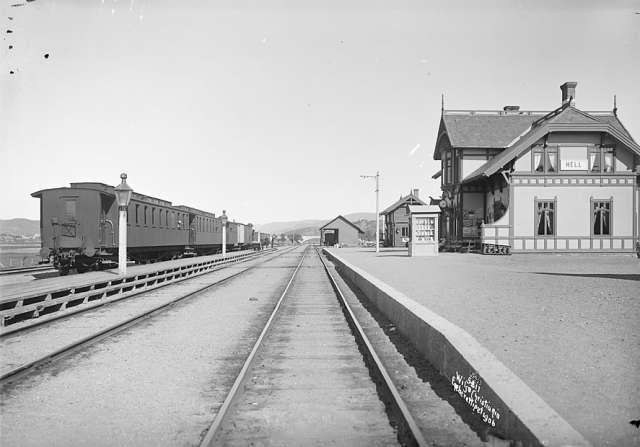
Hell Station—the Meråker Line continues straight ahead while the Hell–Sunnan Line diverts to the left

Construction on the line's second part, from Levanger to Sunnan, started in 1901. Part of the reason for the early start was to help employ older navvies who were working on the southern section during the summer. By early 1904, the right-of-way to Fleskhus was completed and the laying of tracks could begin. The bridge over Verdalselva was built using 473 tonnes (466 long tons; 521 short tons) of stone, which had to be transported 12 kilometers (7.5 mi) from Bagloåsen in Levanger. The superstructure was built by Vulkan of Oslo and was installed between 9 September and 27 November 1903.

In Verdalsøra there again arose a debate over which side of the tracks the station should be on. The townspeople wanted it on the west side, which was on the same side as the town center, while farmers wanted it east side, which was most accessible from the valley. The result was that the station was placed on the east side. The 12.4-kilometer-long (7.7 mi) section from Levanger to Verdal was opened on 1 November 1904, although the station building was not completed until 1905. At the time there were two trains per direction per day, one passenger train and one post train.

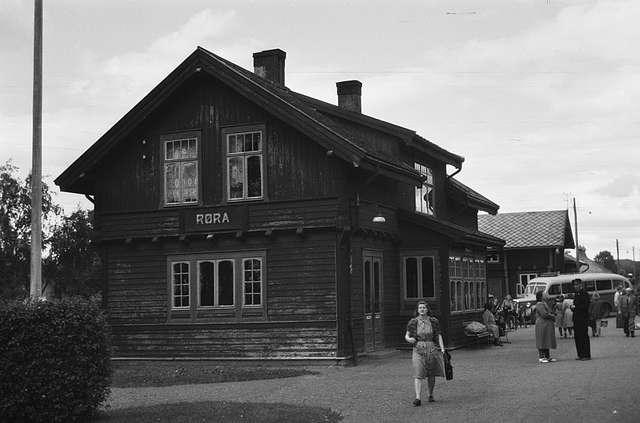
Røra Station in the late 1940s

For the bridge over Ydseelva in Verdal, which had a main span of only 1.5 meters (4 ft 11 in), construction started in April 1903 and was completed on 21 November. The area has quick clay, so the bridge needed piling. At Røra, a spur was originally planned to Hylla, but this was discarded late in the planning phase. At Hellem in Inderøy the right-of-way had to be moved because of poor soil mechanics. There were similar issues north of the Lunnan Tunnel, forcing the tunnel to be extended and a support being built. Construction of the tunnel was performed by 40 men during the winter of 1904 and 1905. It cost NOK 90,179 and took 23.9 man-hours per meter to build.

In the former municipality of Sparbu, there was a contentious debate over both the route and the location of the station. Although the line was built where it had originally been planned, two alternatives were launched, both which saw the line go further east and higher up in the terrain. At the time both the dairy and store were located at Lein. The current villages of Sparbu and Mære had not been established, and locals wanted the railway to go through Lein, which was the de facto municipal center. However, the alternatives were 2 kilometers (1.2 mi) longer and would run through more rolling terrain, so the engineers insisted on the original route. The plans called for a station at Leira (today known as Sparbu) and at Vist, but many locals instead wanted it at Mære, in part to serve the new Mære Agricultural School. On 5 June 1900, Parliament voted in favor of only one station, at Mære. However, the decision was reverted by Parliament on 24 April 1901.

A support wall was built at Sørlia, just south of Steinkjer, after there was a clay landslide. Construction of the bridge over Figgja, just south of Steinkjer, was performed in 1904. The superstructure was built by Kværner of Oslo and installed between 11 November and 21 December 1904. The bridge over Steinkjerelva took up a significant portion of the old river port in Steinkjer, resulting in a spur being built to a new port location. The railway ran right through the town center, forcing 20 houses to be demolished and splitting the town in two. The arrival and route of the railway was described by some locals as vandalism. A counter-proposal which saw the line run further up and cross through Steinkjersannan and Furuskogen—and thus avoid the town itself—was discarded because it would wreck the military camp at Steinkjersannan and would be located too far from the port. There was also a major debate as to whether the station should be on the south side or north side of the river. The municipal council voted for the south side with the mayor's double vote being decisive. Construction of the bridge over Steinkjerelva started in August 1902 and was completed on 7 May 1904. A proposal to build the bridge as a swing bridge was dropped, forcing the railways to pay NOK 45,402 in compensation to companies with facilities upstream.

Steinkjer is surrounded by a moraine which had to be traversed with a cutting, 85 meters (279 ft) long and up to 21 meters (69 ft) deep. 125,000 cubic meters (4,400,000 cu ft) of earthwork was removed, half with a steam shovel, and largely used to build reclaimed land for the railway's right-of-way through Steinkjer. The official opening of the 40.4-kilometer-long (25.1 mi) section between Verdal and Sunnan took place on 14 November 1905. Revenue service started the following day.

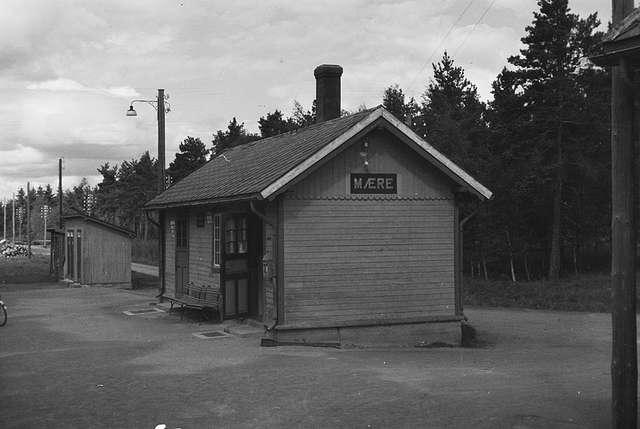
Mære Station in the late 1940s

=== Operation ===
The choice of route through Innherred was largely without much debate, as the line naturally went through all the towns and most of the important villages. Sunnan was a natural place to halt construction, as it is located at the foot of the lake of Snåsavatnet, allowing connection with steam ships. Scheduled services on Snåsavatnet started in 1871 with SS Dina, which was replaced with SS Bonden in 1885. From 1904 to 1921, Bonden was supplemented with MS St. Olaf, although SS Bonden remained in corresponding service with the train until 1926.

Even before planning of the Hell–Sunnan Line was completed, there arose disagreement as to the route onwards. In a plan from the 1870s, there was consensus that the towns of Stjørdal, Levanger, Steinkjer and Namsos should receive a line, but there was a disagreement as to the route. The Beitstad Line would run from Steinkjer via Beitstad and Namdalseid to Namsos and from there to Grong, while the Snåsa Line would run from Sunnan via Snåsa to Grong, with a branch from Grong to Namsos. The Beitstad Line would run through the most densely populated areas, while the Snåsa Line was shorter. Parliament decided on the Snåsa Line in 1900. The railway was extended from Sunnan to Snåsa Station on 30 October 1926, with the section from Hell to Sunnan becoming classified as part of the Nordland Line. The railway was completed to Bodø on 7 June 1962.

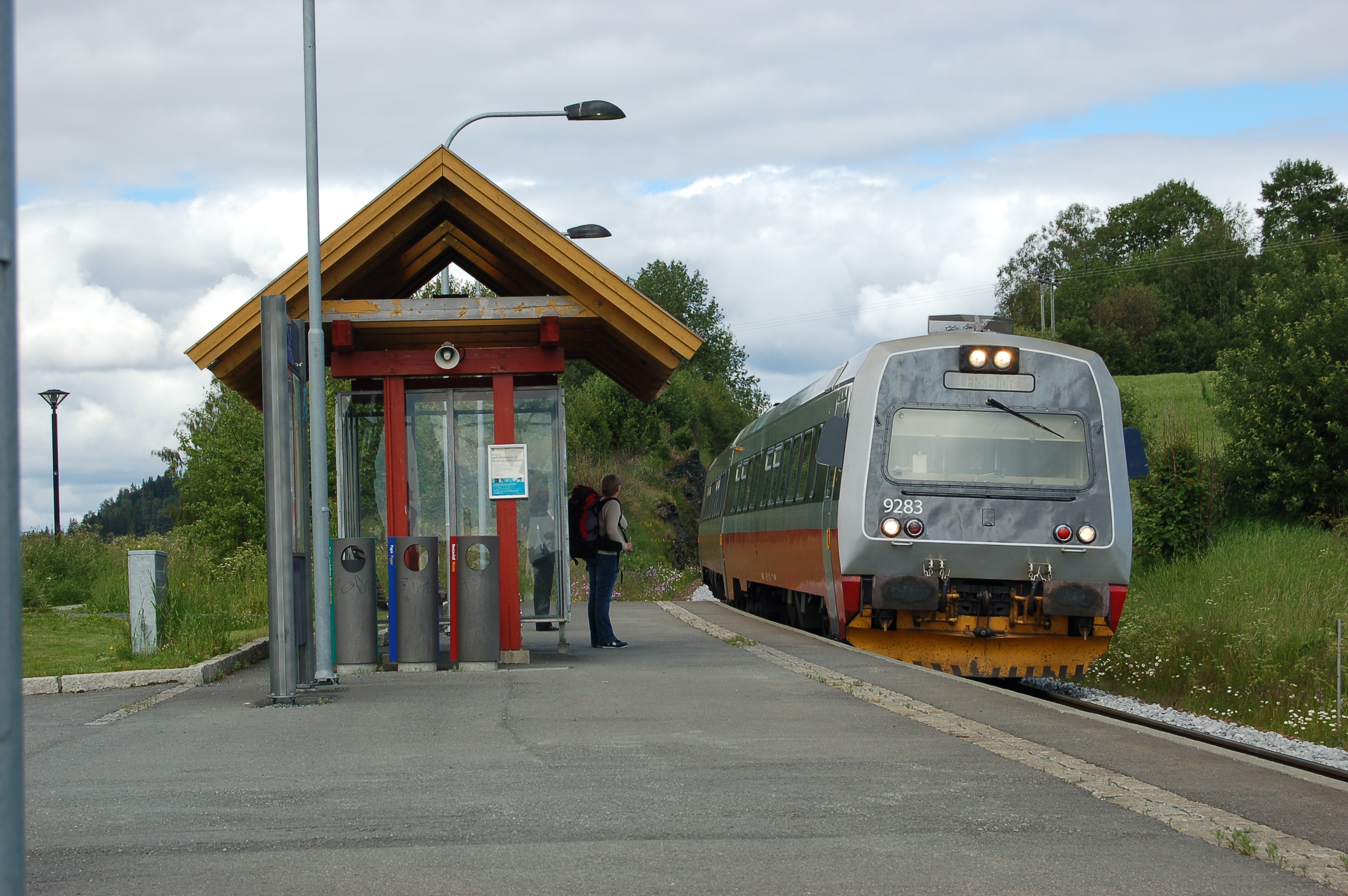
Class 92 diesel multiple unit at HiNT Station, which has only a shed and serves Nord-Trøndelag University College in Levanger

In 1909, a station was opened at Fossemvatnet, followed by a station at Fleskhus in 1913. Mære continued to be the dominant center of Sparbu, so in 1915, the national authorities offered to build a station there. However, the municipality would not grant the necessary NOK 6,300, so the station was funded with private donations. Construction started in 1916 and Mære Station opened on 1 April 1917. In the original plans for the railway, a spur was planned from north of Steinkjerelva to Eggebogen in Egge. However, in the parliamentary voting for the line, the spur was removed. In 1915, a public report criticized the railway for not having sufficient access to a proper port in Steinkjer, as Sørsileiret was located on the river and did not have a deep quay. The municipal council voted in favor of a new quay at Eggebogen on 16 May 1916, which was completed in 1924. The 2.2-kilometer-long (1.4 mi) spur to Bogakaia opened on 15 August 1927, having cost NOK 139,200. A station was opened at Østborg in 1923, at Alstad in 1934, and at Hammerberg, Eggen and Bergsgrav in 1938.

In 1940, a 3-kilometer-long (1.9 mi) spur was built to Værnes Air Station and Øyanmoen. A new, wooden station building was built at Åsen in 1943 and 1944. The section to Værnes was removed in 1947. Vudu Station opened in 1950, followed by Vollan in 1952 and Bjørga and Sandferhus in the following year. From June to October 1953, a station was in use at Bjørga. From 1957, NSB started replacing steam trains on the line by introducing Di 3 locomotives. In 1956, NATO granted funding for an expansion of the runway at Trondheim Airport, Værnes. The easiest way was to extend the runway by building it over the road and railway and into the river. Construction started in 1959 and on 1 June 1960, the Værnes Tunnel was brought into use. A 2.8-kilometer-long (1.7 mi) spur was built to Fiborgtangen in February 1966. Two years later, Elberg Station wax opened. Fossemvatnet Station was closed in 1972.

The line received centralized traffic control in four phases: from Trondheim to Stjørdal on 11 January 1976, to Levanger on 9 January 1977, to Steinkjer on 6 December 1977 and to Snåsa on 23 November 1984. Bergsgrav Station was opened on 6 December 1977. In 1981, Di 4-locomotives were introduced. The spur to Øyanmoen was taken out of use and removed in October 1982. NSB introduced Class 92 diesel multiple units in 1985, cutting travel time on local services between Steinkjer and Trondheim by 25 minutes. In 1989, the station building at Sunnan was demolished. In 1989 and 1990, five stations were closed, consisting on Sandferhus, Vold, Vollan, Vist and Sunnan.

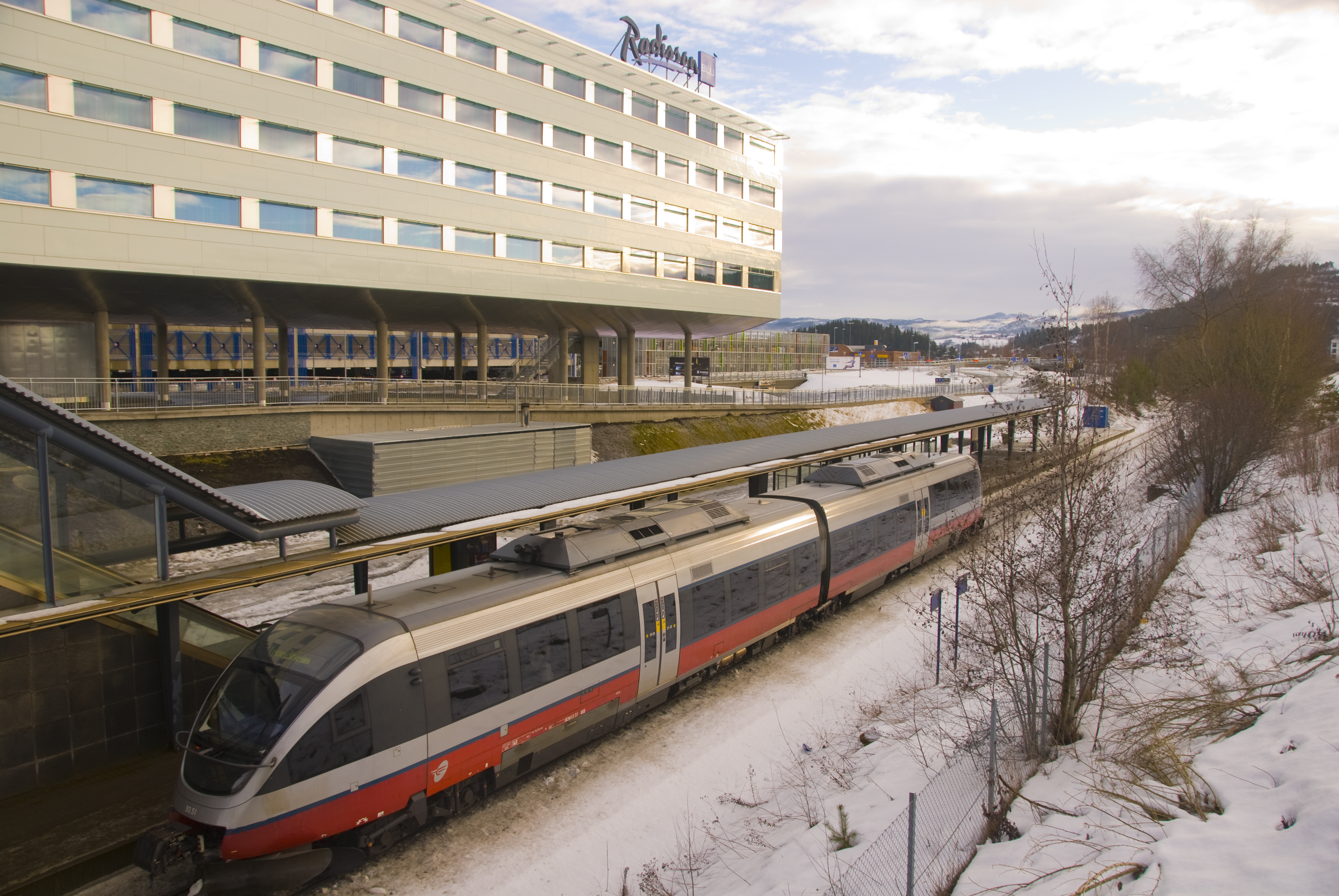
Class 93 train at Trondheim Airport Station

On 1 September 1993, NSB launched the Trøndelag Commuter Rail, of which the main service ran from Steinkjer to Trondheim. The initial plans called for the continued use of the Class 92 rolling stock, but saw change in schedules and the upgrading platforms for NOK 15 million. At the same time, the stations of Alstad, Langstein and Fleskhus were closed. The service from Trondheim to Steinkjer had ten daily round trips. After six months operation, the service had experienced a 40 percent growth in patronage. This was further increased with the opening of Trondheim Airport Station on 15 November 1994, which cost NOK 24 million. The upgrades to the airport also included a new taxiway, which resulted in second Værnes Tunnel being built. A station was also established to serve Levanger Hospital on 20 December 1995. On 10 November 1994, the line received automatic train control. NSB was split up on 1 December 1996 and the ownership of the tracks and infrastructure was inherited by the Norwegian National Rail Administration, while the operation of trains was taken over by the new NSB. From 1994, Di 6 and Di 8 locomotives were introduced, but the Di 6 proved unreliable and returned to the manufacturer.

In 2000, NSB started using Class 93 diesel multiple units on intercity trains, retiring the Di 3. In March 2000, NSB announced the closing of several stations for the commuter train service. Fifty percent of the stations were responsible for only two percent of the traffic, and NSB instead wanted buses to transport people to the closest railway station, which would reduce overall transport time for most passengers. From 7 January 2001, a fixed, hourly headway was introduced on the trains from Steinkjer to Trondheim. Mære, Østborg, Rinnan and Elberg were closed, but HiNT Røstad opened. From June 2001, NSB introduced additional rush-hour trains between Trondheim and Steinkjer, giving a half-hour headway. The Nordland Line had not received NSB's first generation of train radio, Scanet, so was among the first lines to receive GSM-R from 1 December 2004. In 2010, CargoNet started using Vossloh Euro locomotives. Sykehuset Levanger Station was closed on 11 December 2010. Despite generating some 90,000 annual patrons and being one of the busiest stations on the line, it was located too close to Levanger Station to meet safety requirements.

== Architecture ==
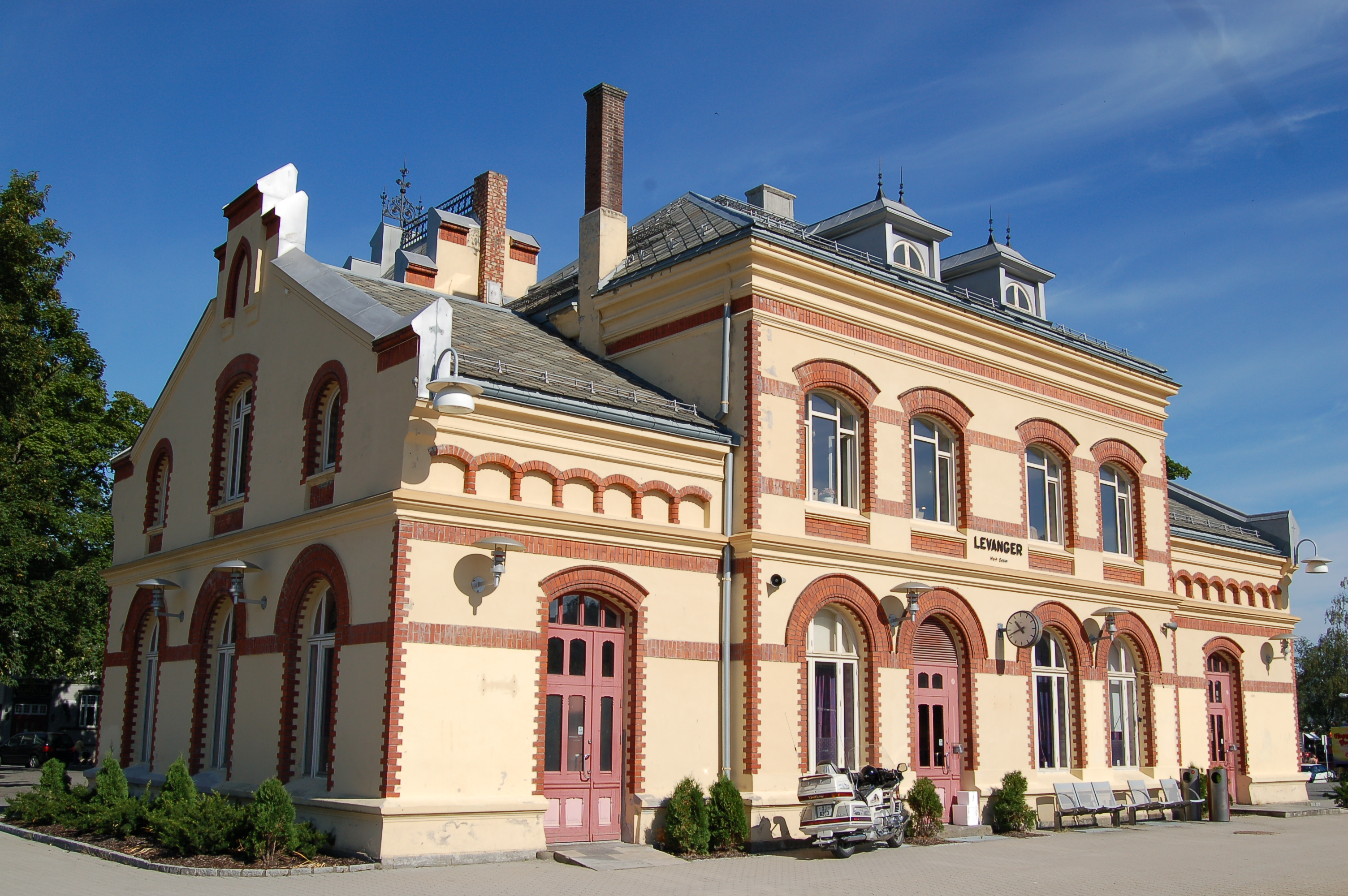
The preserved Levanger Station was built in a combination of Medieval, Gothic and Romanesque style.

The stations were designed by Paul Due (1835–1919) and his son, Paul Armin Due (1870–1926). Original stations between Stjørdal and Levanger were designed by Paul Due, while those from Rinnan to Byafossen, as well as Hell Station, were designed by Paul Armin Due. The designs are characterized by the transition period between Dragestil and Art Nouveau, with early stations dominated more by the former and later stations more by the latter. Norway went through a nationalistic period during the construction, and Paul Due chose to replace his older buildings' foreign elements with traditional Norwegian elements. Røra and Byafossen were the only stations not custom designed, while Sunnan was designed by Peter Andreas Blix—as it was originally built at Hell in 1881.

At the time of construction, the railways provided a leap in transport for the communities it passed through. NSB saw beautiful and grand stations as a way to draw patronage, and chose, in addition to impressive architecture, to build a park adjacent each stations. As construction went by, funding for stations were reduced, resulting in less grandeur further north. Most stations had two stories and an attic, although some of the stations serving lesser places had smaller buildings. From Steinkjer to Skogn, the ground floors were built in random rubble. As construction continued, budgets were reduced and station costs were cut. From Rinnan to Sparbu, the ground floors were instead built in brick, and from Mære and north, the stations have wooden ground floors. In addition to a station buildings, stations consisted of an outhouse and a freight house; selected stations also featured a water tower and motive power depot.

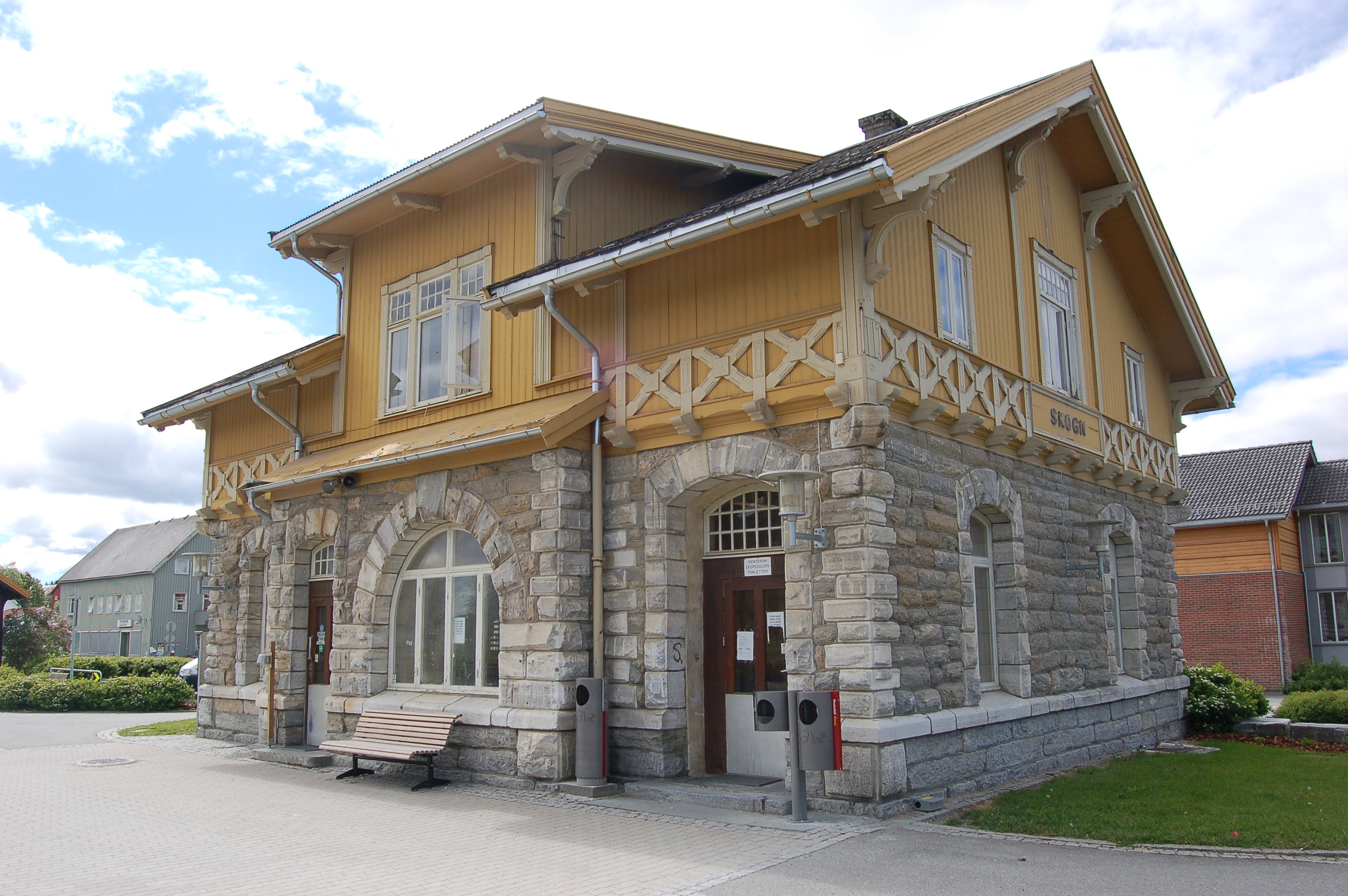
The preserved Skogn Station is an example of the stations' style mix, with a random rubble ground story and wooden upper story, and with elements from both Dragestil and Art Nouveau

Levanger Station is the most spectacular station on the line and also the best preserved town station. Built entirely in stone, it has a dominant position in town and with a park in front of the station. It was designed in combined Medieval style, with strong elements of Gothic and Romanesque style. Steinkjer Station was the other station entirely built in stone. It has a combined Baroque Revival and Art Nouveau style, and is more anonymous than Levanger Station. Its characteristics were largely lost after it was connected with the bus station. Three stations, Langstein, Skogn and Levanger, have been preserved, while Skatval and Hell have been protected.

In 1993, NSB built new sheds on all stations served by the commuter rail. Linje Arkitekter designed sheds which combined the existing architectural traditions in material and roof shapes, with modern style. The sheds have a roof, glass walls and a framework in wood. They were optimized to give good protection from various types weather.

== Service ==
The main passenger service on the section from Hell to Steinkjer is the Trøndelag Commuter Rail. Operated by SJ Norge, it runs at a fixed hourly headway—with additional rush-hour services—between Lerkendal Station in Trondheim and Steinkjer, calling at 13 stations on the Hell–Sunnan Line. Travel time from Steinkjer is 24 minutes to Verdal, 37 minutes to Levanger, 1 hour and 24 minutes to Stjørdal and 2 hours and 4 minutes to Trondheim. The services are operated with Class 92 diesel multiple units.

NSB also operates intercity services from Trondheim to Bodø on the Nordland Line. These consist of two daily through trains, one day and one night service, with an additional service between Trondheim and Mo i Rana. Stjørdal and Steinkjer are the only stations along the line which remain staffed. NSB uses a combination of Class 93 diesel multiple units and Di 4-hauled trains. CargoNet and Cargolink operate freight trains along the line. CargoNet hauls using Vossloh Euro, while Cargolink uses Di 6 locomotives, respectively.

== Future ==
Politicians have signalized that they want to electrify the tracks from Trondheim to Steinkjer along with the Meråker Line. NSB will need to replace the Class 92 trains towards the end the 2010s, and want to coordinate the new stock with electrification. The county municipalities of Nord-Trøndelag and Sør-Trøndelag proposed during the early 2000s that the Nordland Line between Trondheim and Steinkjer be upgraded reduce travel time to one hour. This would require the average speed to be increased to 115 kilometers per hour (71 mph), mainly through a modernization of the existing line. Specific projects include electrification, double track between Trondheim and Trondheim Airport, additional passing loops, a new bridge over Stjørdalselva and a rearrangement of the tracks at Hell. This would have to be combined with a reduction in the number of stops. The National Rail Administration estimates that the mentioned investments, which would cost between NOK 4 and 6 billion, will allow a travel time of one hour and ten minutes. If a number of curves are straightened, increased capacity is introduced between Stjørdal and Steinkjer and a further number of stops are removed, travel time could be reduced to one hour.

Norsk Bane, a lobbyist organization which is suggesting to build a high-speed line from Oslo to Trondheim and onwards to Steinkjer, have proposed building an all-new right-of-way on the route. They estimate that regional trains would, with their infrastructure, be able to operate trains from Steinkjer to Trondheim in 40 minutes. The proposals involves only keeping the stations at Trondheim Airport, Stjørdal, Åsen, Levanger, Verdal, Røra and Steinkjer along the Hell–Sunnan segment. It would involve three services per hour and direct trains to Oslo, with speeds up to 300 kilometers per hour (190 mph).
