= Mære Station =

Former railway station in Steinkjer, Norway

Mære Station Mære stasjon
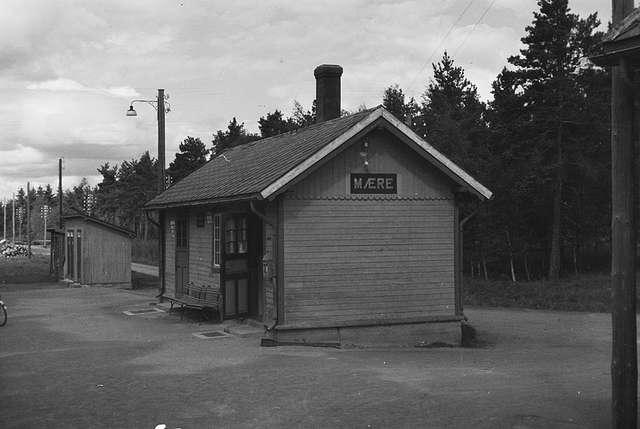
- View of the station

General information
- Location: Mære, Steinkjer Municipality; Trøndelag; Norway
- Coordinates: 63°56′13″N 11°25′14″E
- Elevation: 20.1 m (66 ft)
- System: Railway station
- Owner: Norwegian State Railways
- Line: Nordlandsbanen
- Distance: 114.84 km (71.36 mi)
- Platforms: 1

History
- Opened: 1 April 1917
- Closed: 7 January 2001
Location
- Location within Trøndelag Location within Norway

Mære Station (Norwegian: Mære holdeplass) was a railway station on the Nordland Line at the village of Mære in Steinkjer Municipality in Trøndelag, Norway. The station opened on 1 April 1917 and closed on 7 January 2001.

== History ==
During the planning of the Hell–Sunnan Line, there was a contentious debate over both the route and the location of the station within the former Sparbu Municipality. The surveys from 1893 proposed a line which would run from Kåberg through Mære to Vist. Two alternative proposals were made, both which ran further east and higher up. The first was for it to run via Leira to Hamren and then down to Mære; this would cost 30,000 Norwegian krone extra and increased the railway's gradient. The second alternative would run from Røskje via Ystgård, Lein, Jørum, Lian and Lånkan to Vist. The second alternative went through even more rolling terrain and would be 2-kilometer (1.2 mi) longer. Both were quickly rejected by the railway engineers. The reason for the alternatives was that there was local desire for the station to be located Lein, which at the time was the natural community center, as it had Nord-Trøndelag county's largest dairy and the store.

Also the placement of stations was contentious. The original plans called for two stations, at Leira (later Sparbu) and Vist. At the time, neither of these locations represented any center of community life. An alternative location at Mære was proposed, with its proponents arguing that it was closer to the newly established Mære Upper Secondary School and Mære Church. The issue was debated in the municipal council of Sparbu Municipality in 1898. The initial council decision was to place the station at Kåberg or Hamrun, both at Sparbu, in addition to Vist. Proponents of this location argued that Sparbu was closer for a larger share of the municipality's residents, as a large part of the farms were located uphill from Sparbu. Voting was largely after which station was closest to home for each councilor. The municipal council officially recommended Parliament to choose Kåberg on 17 January 1900.

In the Parliamentary proposal, Sparbu and Vist were suggested as stations. However, in the session, a proposal for a single station at Mære was made and was passed by Parliament on 5 June 1900. During the fall, the Nord-Trøndelag parliamentarians asked that the issue of stations be considered again and that the legislature consider additional stations at Røskje and Vist. On 24 April 1901, Parliament decided that there be built two stations, one at Sparbu and one at Vist. On 25 February 1904, the county engineer proposed moving the station from Sparbu to Mære, but this discarded after the construction difficulties were solved. The Hell–Sunnan Line was completed on 14 November 1905 without a station at Mære.

Mære continued to be the dominant center of Sparbu, as it the following ten years saw both a penal institution and trial farm be established. In 1915, central authorities again started working on plans for a station at Mære. However, the government required that Sparbu Municipality grant 6,300 kr towards the station, something the municipality was not willing to do. Financing was therefore secured through private donations. Construction started in 1916 and the station opened on 1 April 1917.

At the time Mære Station opened, neither Sparbu nor Mære were settlements. Coop established a store at Mære in 1922, which was followed by a power station, a bank and a cheese factory. Sparbu, located 2 kilometers (1.2 mi) south, also received many public facilities. In 1940, the administrative seat of Sparbu was moved to Mære, after which Mære Station had higher patronage than Sparbu Station. However, the choice to build two stations close to each other resulted in two small villages, neither of which was able to provide a full range of services, and both stations retained low patronage. Mære Station remained staffed until 16 February 1969 and on 24 October 1977, the line past the station received centralized traffic control.

Mære became part of the Trøndelag Commuter Rail from 1 September 1993, giving the station ten daily services in each direction between Steinkjer and Trondheim. The station was upgraded with a new shed. In March 2000, NSB announced a heavy decrease of stations along the commuter rail, and instead uses buses to freight people to more central stations. From 7 January 2001, Mære became one of six stations between Steinkjer and Trondheim to be closed.

== Facilities ==
Mære Station was located on the Nordland Line at 114.84 kilometers (71.36 mi) from Trondheim Central Station, at 20.1 meters (66 ft) above mean sea level. The station had only a simple single story station building and lacked a passing loop.

Preceding station		Following station
Sparbu	Nordland Line	Steinkjer; Vist
