= Alstad station =

Former railway station in Stjørdal, Norway

Alstad Station Alstad stasjon

General information
- Location: Skatval, Stjørdal Municipality; Trøndelag; Norway
- Coordinates: 63.527°N 10.804°E
- Elevation: 89.6 m (294 ft)
- System: Railway station
- Owner: Norwegian State Railways
- Line: Nordlandsbanen
- Distance: 45.01 km (27.97 mi)
- Platforms: 1

History
- Opened: 1934
- Closed: 1 September 1993
Location
- Location within Trøndelag Location within Norway

Alstad Station (Norwegian: Alstad holdeplass) was a railway station on the Nordland Line just north of the village of Skatval in Stjørdal Municipality in Trøndelag county, Norway. With the opening of the section of the Hell–Sunnan Line through Stjørdal on 29 October 1902, a passing loop was taken into use at Alstad. A station was built 50 meters (160 ft) north of the passing loop in 1934. The passing loop was removed in 1972 and the station remained in revenue service until 23 May 1993. It was officially closed on 1 September 1993.

Preceding station		Following station
Skatval	Nordland Line	Åsen; Langstein
