= Sandferhus station =

Railway station in Stjørdal, Norway

Sandferhus station Sandferhus stasjon

General information
- Location: Værnes, Stjørdal Municipality; Trøndelag; Norway
- Coordinates: 63.450°N 10.913°E
- System: Railway station
- Owner: Norwegian State Railways
- Line: Nordlandsbanen
- Distance: 32.64 km (20.28 mi)
- Platforms: 1

History
- Opened: 1 July 1953
- Closed: 28 May 1989
Location
- Location within Trøndelag Location within Norway

Sandferhus station (Norwegian: Sandferhus holdeplass) was a railway station on the Nordland Line at Værnes in Stjørdal Municipality in Trøndelag, Norway. The station opened on 1 July 1953 and was known as Sandfærhus until November 1953. Train services stopped on 20 May 1988 and the station was officially closed on 28 May 1989.

Preceding station		Following station
Hell	Nordland Line	Trondheim Airport
