= Trøndelag Commuter Rail =

Commuter train service in Norway

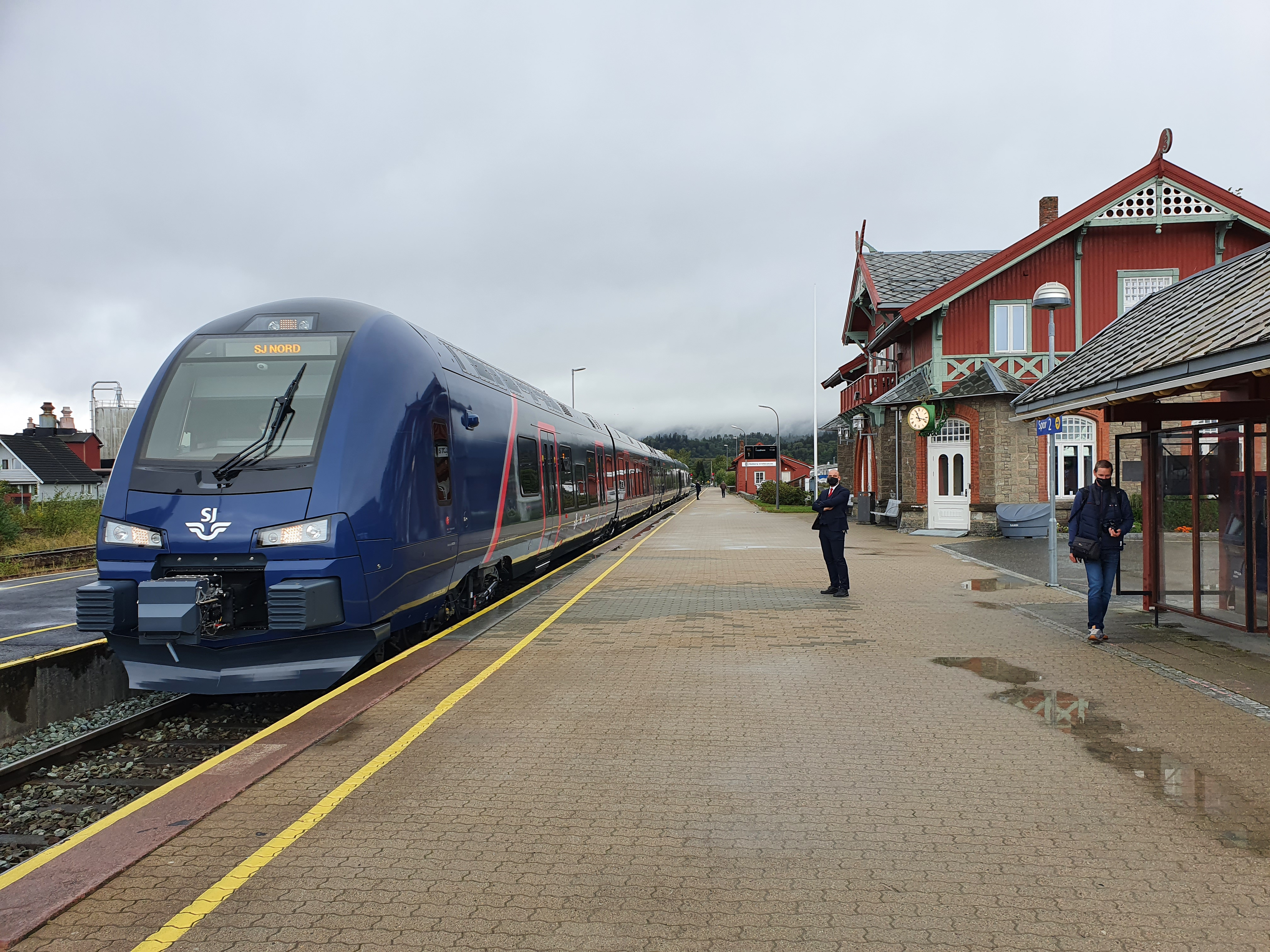

Overview
- Owner: Norwegian Railway Directorate
- Locale: Trøndelag, Norway
- Transit type: Commuter rail
- Number of lines: 2
- Number of stations: 35
- Daily ridership: 3,300

Operation
- Began operation: 1 September 1993 (first section opened in 1864)
- Operator: SJ Norge

Technical
- System length: 290 km (180 mi)
- Track gauge: 1,435 mm (4 ft 8 1/2 in)
- Electrification: Diesel and Electric/Hybrid trains

The Trøndelag Commuter Rail (Norwegian: Trønderbanen, Urban East Norwegian: [ˈtrœ̀ndərˌbɑːnn̩]) is a commuter train service operating in Trøndelag county, Norway. It was operated with Class 92 diesel multiple units by Vy (formerly Norwegian State Railways, NSB), until 7 June 2020, when SJ Norge took over the contract until 2030. The service provides a commuter service connecting Trondheim Municipality to its suburbs, between towns in Innherred and as an airport rail link for Trondheim Airport, Værnes. Although passenger services have operated along the lines since 1864, the commuter train was created with an increase of service with existing rolling stock in 1993. In 2019, the system was used by 1.4 million passengers.

The main service operates from Lerkendal in Trondheim via Trondheim Central Station and Trondheim Airport Station to Steinkjer on the Nordland Line. The service runs every hour, with additional rush-hour services, and reduced service in the evenings and on the weekend. A secondary service runs from Trondheim along the Dovre Line to Støren and along the Røros Line to Røros. The Mittnabotåget service operates twice a day from Trondheim along the Meråker Line and the Central Line in Sweden to Östersund Central Station.

== Route ==
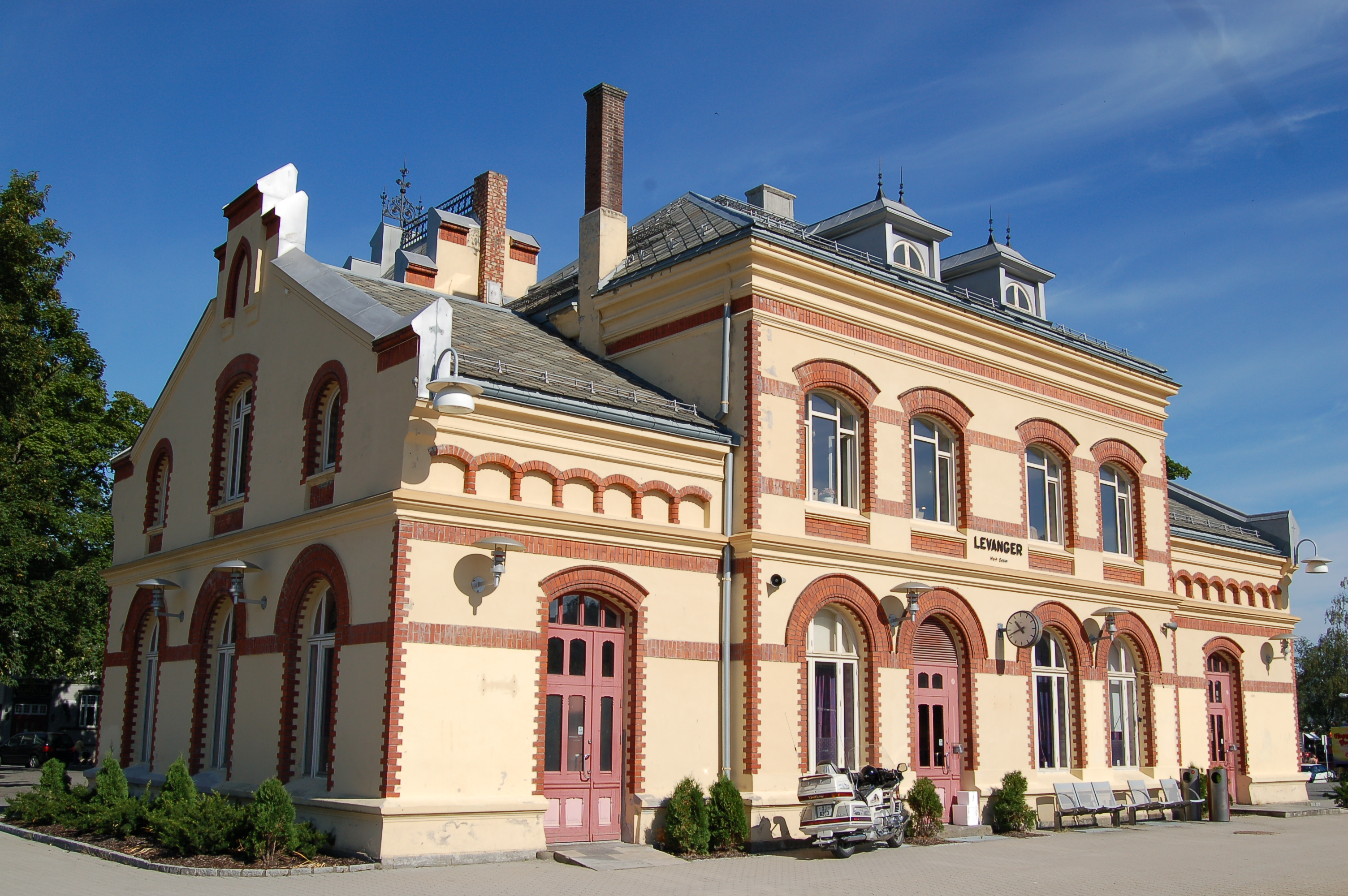
Levanger Station, which serves the town of Levanger. Built in a combination of Medieval, Gothic and Romanesque style, it is one of several preserved stations along the system.

The main hub for the commuter system is Trondheim Central Station (Trondheim S). It also serves as coach and bus station and the terminus of the intercity trains along the Dovre and Nordland Line. The service runs north-eastwards through Trondheim, stopping at the stations Lademoen/Nedre Elvehavn (which serves a mixed residential and commercial area), Lilleby (which serves a residential area), Leangen and Rotvoll; the last two serve each their campus of Sør-Trøndelag University College. In Malvik Municipality, the line serves two stations: Vikhammer and Hommelvik. After entering Stjørdal Municipality, the first station is Hell, where the Meråker Line branches off from the Nordland Line. Northwards is first Trondheim Airport, Stjørdal (the main station to serve the town) and Skatval.

After entering Levanger Municipality, the line serves the villages of Åsen, Ronglan (limited services only) and Skogn. The line then enters the town center, where there are two stations: Levanger Station serves the town center and bus station and HiNT Røstad serves the campus of Nord-Trøndelag University College. The line continues to Verdal Municipality, where it serves the suburb at Bergsgrav before the town center at Verdal. Inderøy Municipality is served by the village station Røra, before the line enters Steinkjer Municipality, where it serves the village of Sparbu before terminating in the town center at Steinkjer.

South of Trondheim S, both the main service and the Røros service run along the Dovre Line, stopping at Skansen, where there is transfer to the Trondheim Tramway, and Marienborg, located beside St. Olavs University Hospital. After Marienborg, the main service branches off along the Stavne–Leangen Line to the terminus at Lerkendal, which serves the Gløshaugen campus of the Norwegian University of Science and Technology and Lerkendal Stadion, the home ground of Rosenborg BK.

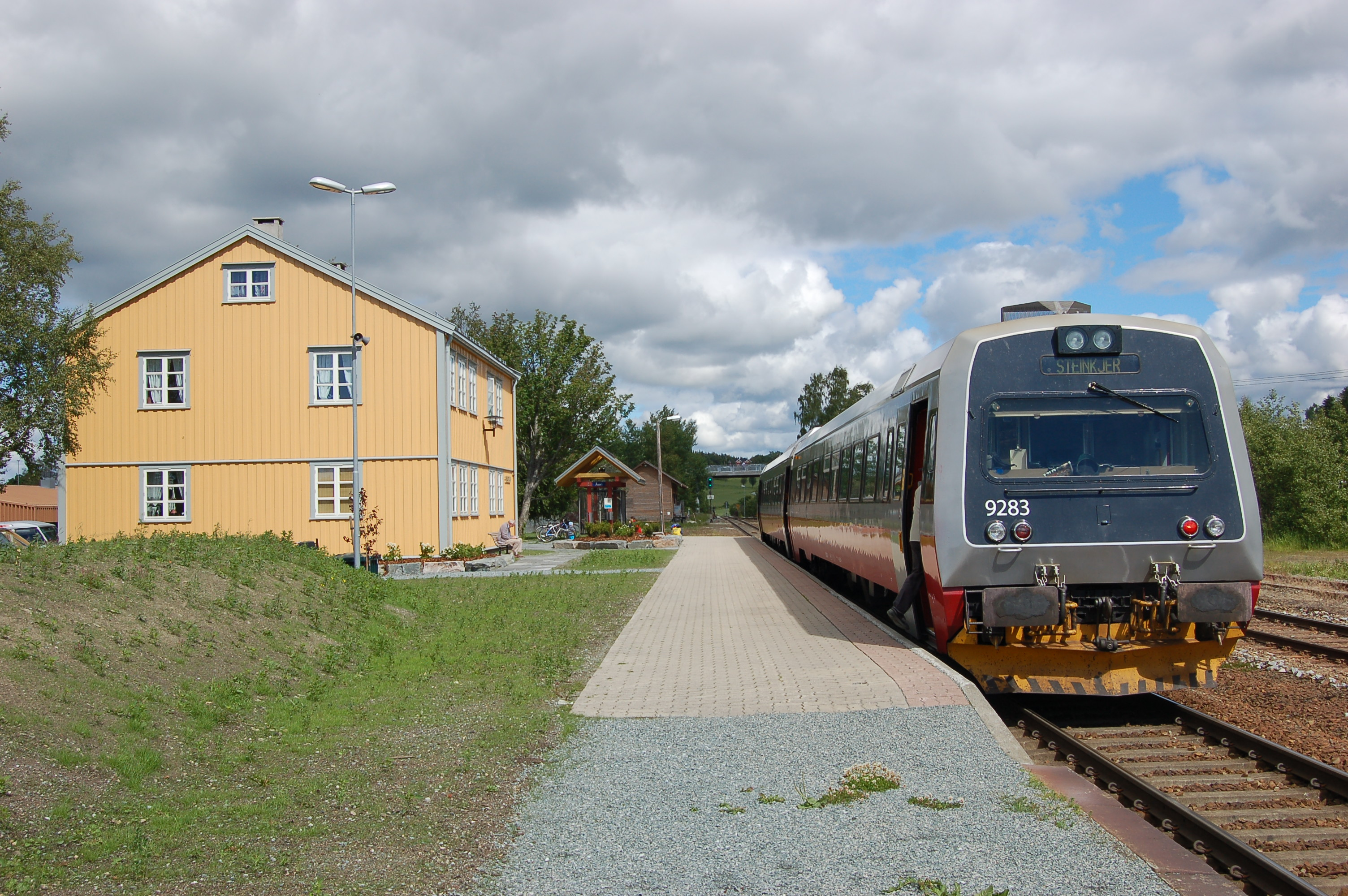
Åsen Station serves the village of Åsen

The Røros service continues south, making two more stops within Trondheim: Selsbakk and Heimdal. It continues through Melhus Municipality, where it makes five stops, one in the town center at Melhus and then in the villages of Kvål, Ler, Lundamo and Hovin. In Midtre Gauldal Municipality, the service stops at Støren, where the Røros Line branches from the Dovre Line. The single daily service to Oppdal runs southwards, with an intermediate stop at Berkåk. The Røros service continues along the Røros Line, stopping at Singsås before entering Holtålen Municipality, where there are stops at Haltdalen and Ålen. After entering Røros Municipality, its terminus is at Røros Station, where there is a transfer to regional rail services southwards.

Mittnabotåget start at Heimdal and operate northwards via Trondheim S to Hell, where they branch off and follow the Meråker Line. In Stjørdal, it serves Hegra before entering Meråker Municipality, where it serves the villages at Meråker and Kopperå before reaching the Swedish border at Storlien. Here the services continues along the Central Line in Sweden, where stops are made at Enafors, Ånn, Duved, Åre, Undersåker, Järpen, Krokom, Östersund West and Östersund Central Station.

== Service ==
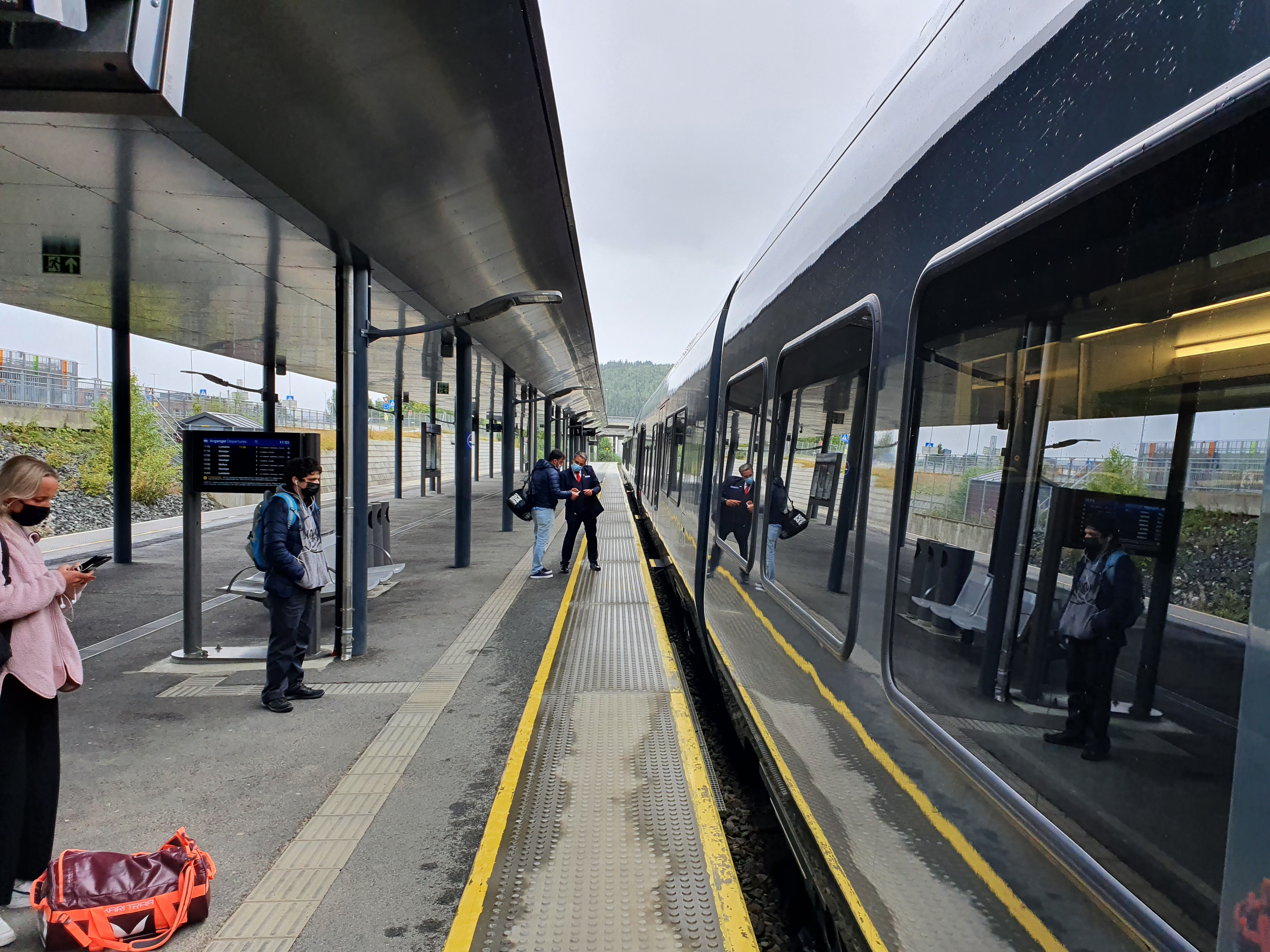
The system became the first airport rail link in the Nordic Countries with the opening of Trondheim Airport Station in 1994

The operating deficits are covered through subsidies by the Norwegian Ministry of Transport and Communications. The track and other infrastructure is owned by the government agency Norwegian National Rail Administration, while the rolling stock is owned and operated by the Norwegian State Railways (NSB). Rolling stock maintenance is performed by NSB-owned Mantena.

The Trondheim–Steinkjer service operates with a fixed, hourly, headway during the day with additional rush-hour services giving a half-hour headway. In the evenings and weekends, there is a two-hour headway. Travel time from Lerkendal to Trondheim S is 10 minutes; from Trondheim S travel time to Trondheim Airport is 35 minutes, to Stjørdal 41 minutes, to Levanger 1 hour and 25 minutes, to Verdal 1 hour and 41 minutes and to Steinkjer 2 hours and 5 minutes. The Trondheim–Røros service is provided five times per day in each direction. From Trondheim S, travel time to Melhus is 24 minutes, to Støren 1 hour and to Røros 2 hours and 25 minutes. A single morning one-direction service is offered from Oppdal to Trondheim S; this service takes 1 hour and 45 minutes. The Mittnabotåget service to Östersund provides two round trips per day, with travel time from Trondheim S to Östersund C 3 hours and 46 minutes. This service is operated jointly between NSB and Veolia Transport.

== Rolling stock ==
=== Class 92 ===
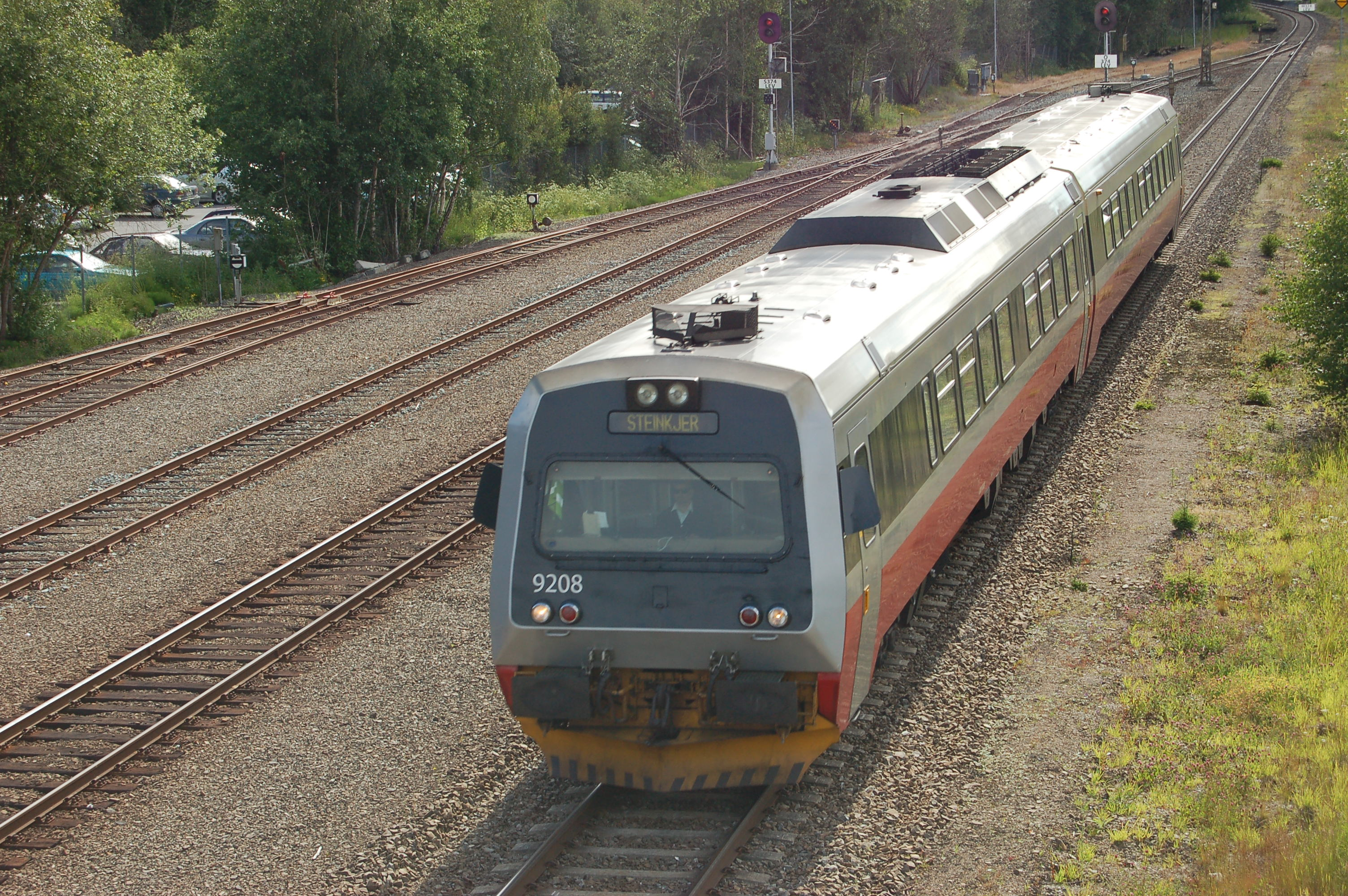
A Class 92 train at Levanger

Most of the trains operated on the line are Class 92. They were built by Duewag in 1984 and 1985 and consist of two cars, giving a seating capacity of 168 people. A double-unit is 49.45 metres (162.2 ft) long and weighs 92 tonnes (91 long tons; 101 short tons), of which the motor car weighs 58 tonnes (57 long tons; 64 short tons). Only one car is powered, and is equipped with a Daimler-Benz OM424A prime mover which powers two electric motors, giving a power output of 714 kilowatts (957 hp). The trains are capable of 140 kilometres per hour (87 mph) and are equipped with vending machines.

=== Class 93 ===
A number of Class 93 have been built by Bombardier. These mostly run regional services, to Mo i Rana / Bodø and Røros / Hamar and not much on the commuter rail.

=== Class 76 ===
In 2021 Hybrid Electric trains from Stadler were to replace all the Class 92s, with these trains and class 93s operating.

== Stations ==
The commuter rail system serves 39 railway stations, most of which predate the commuter rail service. When the Røros, Meråker and Nordland Lines were built, stations buildings were built at all places with a passing loop, and most of these stations the buildings remain, although they are not necessarily open to travelers. However, only Trondheim, Stjørdal, Steinkjer and Røros are staffed. Several of the station and operation buildings along the line have been preserved by the Norwegian Directorate for Cultural Heritage. These include the stations at Singsås, Hell, Skatval, Langstein, Skogn and Levanger. The system's depot is located at Marienborg, although trains also overnight at terminal stations.

== History ==
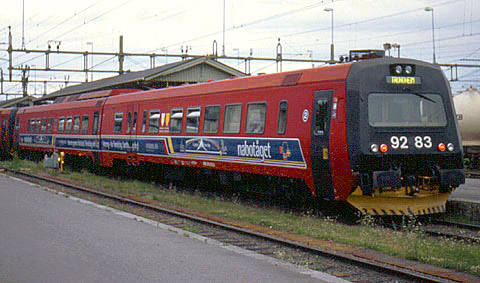
Class 92 train in the old livery at Östersund Central Station

The rearrangement of the train services in Trøndelag was made in 1993, when NSB announced the brand Trønderbanen. The concept was based on the Jæren Commuter Rail which had been established the previous year, operating between Stavanger and Egersund. The Trøndelag Commuter Rail would operate several services, north of Trondheim to Steinkjer and south to Oppdal and Tynset. The initial plans called to the continued use of the Class 92 rolling stock, but saw change in schedules and new upgraded platforms for 15 million kr. This involved building a small platform house with a roof and glass walls, but a framework of wood, at each station. They were optimized to give good protection from various types weather.

The service started on 1 September 1993. The changes to the schedule involved almost a doubling of the number of departures, particularly between Trondheim and Stjørdal, where a one-hour headway was introduced. The service from Trondheim to Steinkjer had ten daily round trips. While local trains had existed previously north of Trondheim, the services south to Oppdal were all new in an area which was previously only served by intercity and night trains. The initial services consisted of four services from Trondheim—northwards along the Nordland Line to Steinkjer, east along the Meråker Line to Storlien, south along the Dovre Line to Oppdal and south-east along the Røros Line to Tynset.

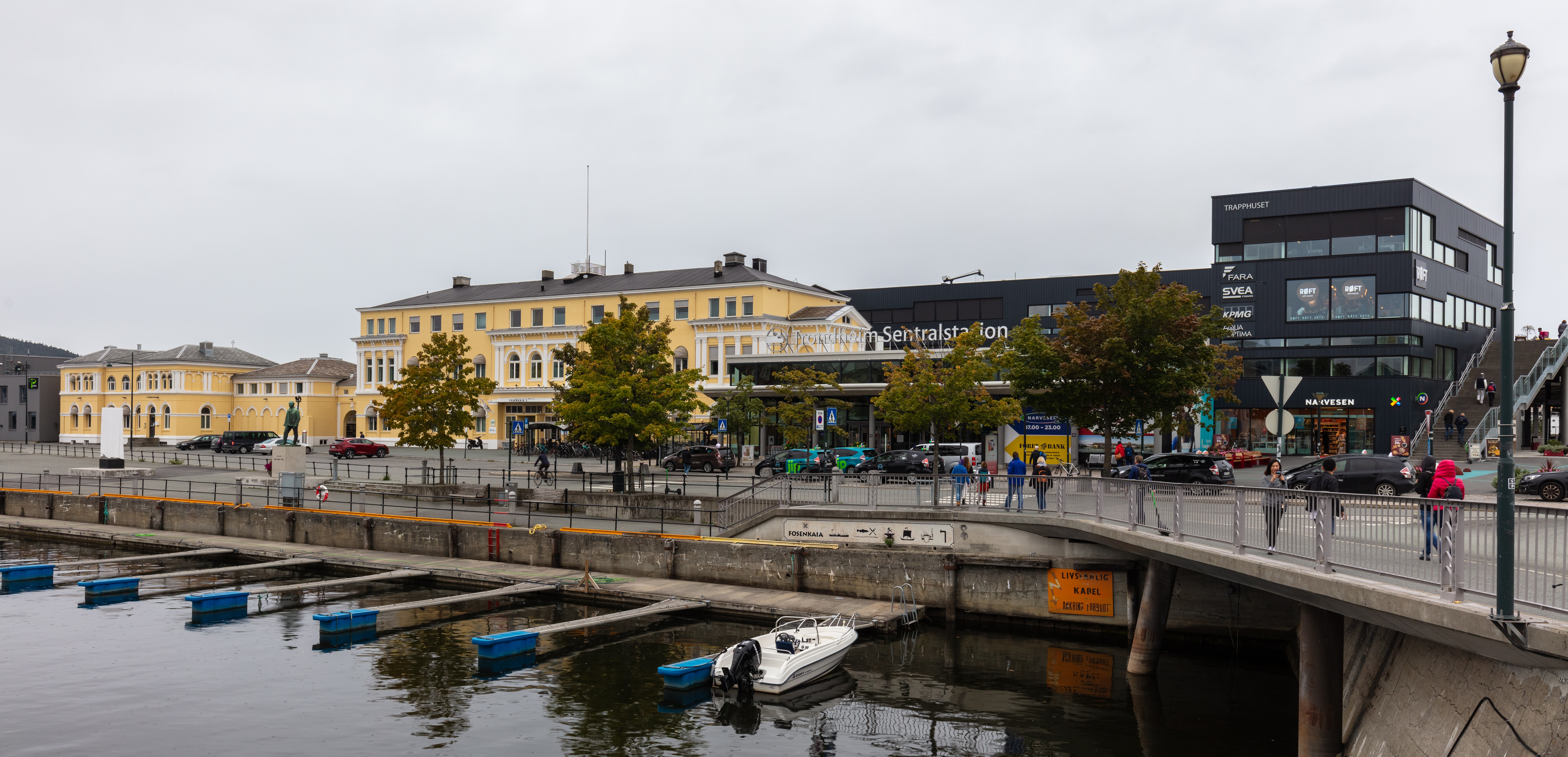
Trondheim Central Station acts as the center-point of the commuter rail

After six months operation, the service had experienced a 40% traffic increase. On 15 November 1994, the Trøndelag Commuter Rail became the first airport rail link in the Nordic Countries, when a new terminal and Trondheim Airport Station opened at Trondheim Airport, Værnes. NSB stated that their primary goal was not to compete with the four hourly airport coaches which operated to the hotels in Trondheim, but instead to provide services to communities in Nord-Trøndelag and south of Trondheim. The investment at the airport cost 24 million kr.

From January 1995, the frequency between Steinkjer and Melhus was increased slightly. On 26 September 1995, the train station in Trondheim reopened as a renovated station that serves buses, coaches and trains. The investment cost NOK 50 million. In 1997, NSB stated that the Trøndelag Commuter Rail was unprofitable and threatened to terminate it, along with an array of other services, if funding was not increased. The same year, 750,000 people traveled on the commuter rail. The 20% increase that year was in part due to the FIS Nordic World Ski Championships 1997 being held in Trondheim, and was the service in the country with the largest growth.

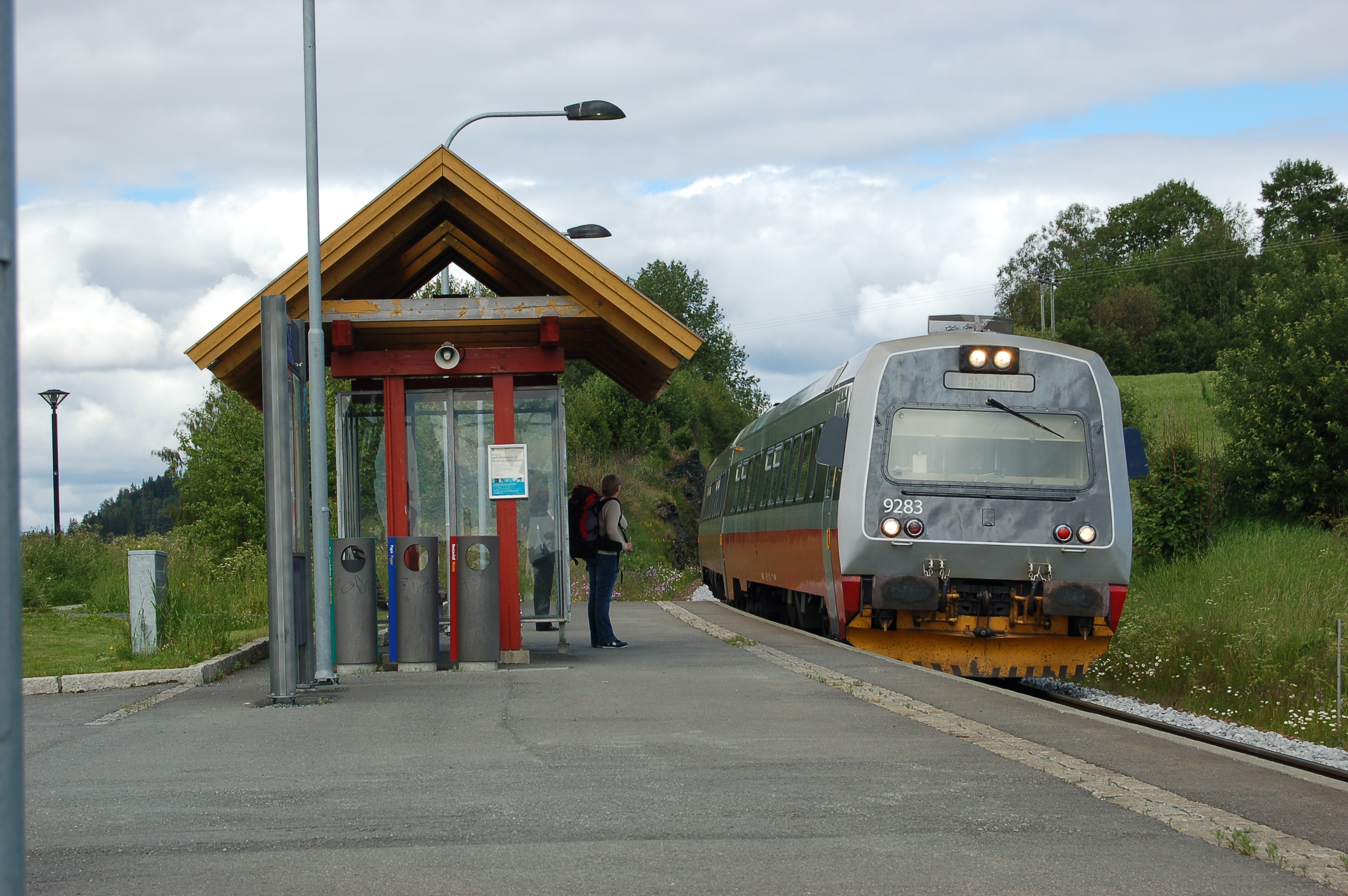
HiNT Røstad opened in 2001 to serve the Røstad campus of Nord-Trøndelag University College

Following the Åsta accident on 4 January 2000, when a Class 92 was wrecked and taken out of service, NSB announced that they would terminate two of the commuter rail services south of Støren towards Oppdal. At the same time, the company announced a reduction in the number of services from Trondheim to Steinkjer. From 11 June 2000, all services on the Dovre Line south of Støren were terminated, leaving only intercity services. At the same year, plans by local politicians and commerce were launched to halve the travel time between Trondheim and Steinkjer, under the motto "Trondheim to Steinkjer in one hour". NSB hoped to introduce a faster airport link, similar to the Airport Express Train in Oslo, which would allow the trains to operate from Trondheim to the airport in 20 minutes. The plans would have called for the termination of service at 17 of 21 stations and investments at about NOK 3.7 billion.

In March 2000, NSB announced that they were considering reducing the number of stations on the commuter rail from the then 31 stations to between 15 and 20. NSB stated that 50% of the stations were responsible for only 2% of the traffic, and that a bus service – which would transport people to the closest railway station – would be more economic and reduce travel time for the remaining passengers. NSB also stated that they intended to re-brand the service as part of the Puls brand used for the other commuter rail services. Part of the reason for the change of service was that Nord-Trøndelag County Municipality had permitted TrønderBilene to double the number of services on their competing coach service along the route and the commuter rail needed to increase its speed to not lose customers to the coach.

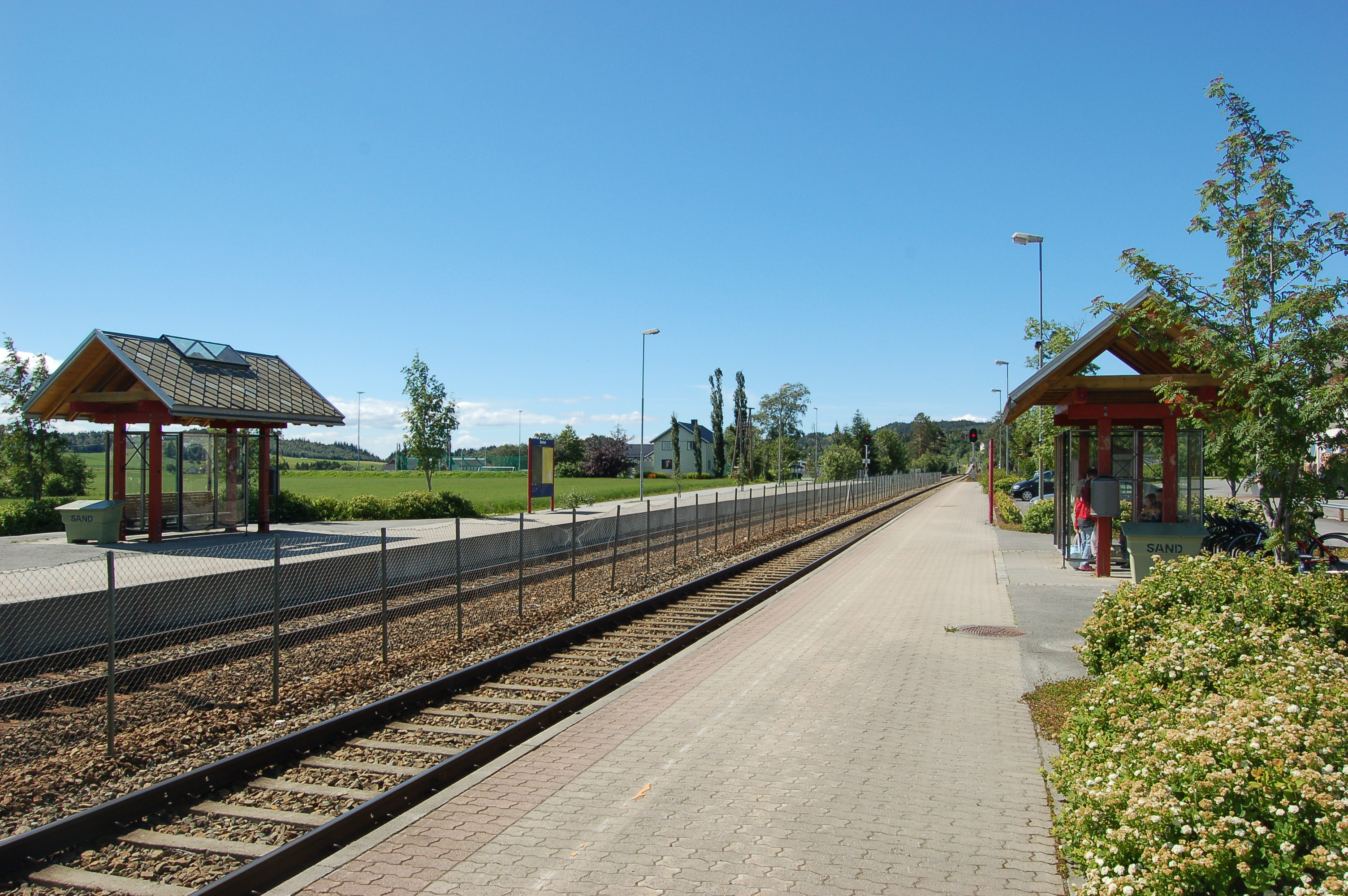
Skatval Station serves Skatval, a rural village in Stjørdal

From 7 January 2001, NSB made several major changes to the commuter rail. A fixed, hourly headway was introduced on the trains from Steinkjer to Trondheim; including extra rush-hour trains from Lerkendal to Stjørdal, giving 23 departures per day in each direction. South of Trondheim, the service was rerouted to terminate at Lerkendal. Six stations were closed: Muruvik, Solbakken, Mære, Østborg, Rinnan and Elberg. At the same time, the station at Marienborg and Røstad opened. NSB also introduced a fare zone system, which gave up to NOK 20 discount for single-fare travelers and about the same fares for month-pass holders. Part of the reason for the expansion was that the delivery of the new Class 93 trains for regional services freed up more Class 92 units. This also allowed NSB to operate some of services with double unit (four-car) trains in rush-hour.

The restructuring also called for the reduction of four services on the Meråker Line and two services to Oppdal, terminating all commuter train services on the lines. For the service to Oppdal, NSB had an operating deficit of NOK 1.7 million and 21,000 passengers in 1998. The Meråker Line had about twice the number of passengers. The National Rail Administration stated that if any private companies wanted to operate the routes without subsidies, they were free to do so. As compensation, travelers between Trondheim and Rennebu Municipality and Oppdal with month passes were allowed to not pay for seat reservations on the intercity services. Sør-Trøndelag County Municipality applied to the ministry to take over responsibility and purchase the commuter train services, so they could continue the service to Oppdal, but this was rejected by the ministry.

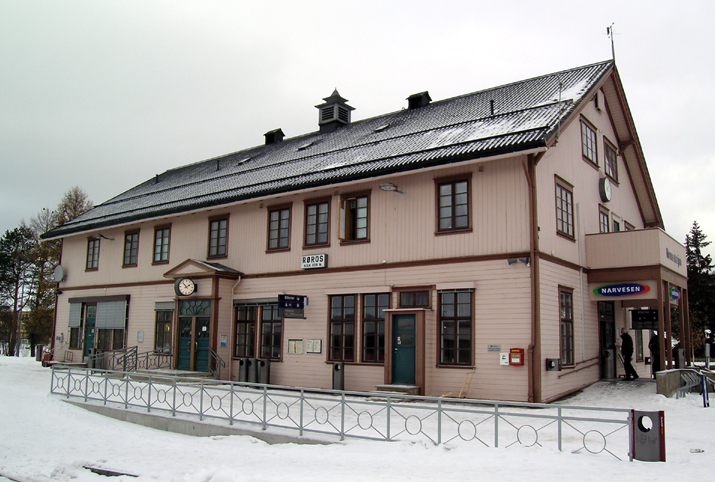
The World Heritage Site town Røros is served by Røros Station, the southern terminus of the system.

From June 2001, NSB introduced additional rush-hour trains between Trondheim and Steinkjer, giving a half-hour headway. From 22 September 2002, NSB and the Public Transportation Authority in Jämtlands County started a cooperation that involved two daily round trips with a Class 92 trains between Trondheim and Östersund in Sweden. The trains were staffed by NSB on the Norwegian side of the border, and by BK Tåg staff on the Swedish side, after the latter had won a public service obligation contract with the Swedish authority. From 16 June 2003, NSB reintroduced commuter trains between Trondheim and Oppdal. From 1 January 2004, the commuter rail service was reorganized. The brand Trønderbanen was abandoned and the administration was assimilated into the functional departments and partially moved to Oslo. In 2005 and 2006, the Class 92 trains were renovated and received a new exterior and interior color. On 8 January 2007, Lademoen/Nedre Elvehavn Station in Trondheim opened. Previously, the former station known as Lademoen was renamed Lilleby so the new station serving Nedre Elvehavn could be named Lademoen. The name-change caused protests from historians and the municipal committee responsible for naming. The 4.4-kilometer (2.7 mi) long Gevingåsen Tunnel opened on 15 August 2011, shortening travel time between Hommelvik and Værnes by five minutes. It also allows the number of trains on the line between Trondheim and Stjørdal to increase to eight trains per hour (both directions combined), which will free up sufficient capacity to allow additional commuter trains to run to Stjørdal.

The Sykehuset Levanger Station was closed in 2011 for formal technical reasons. The station was located in a curve and within the signaling area of Levanger Station (600 m distance). Because of the adjacent Levanger Hospital, the station was one of the busiest on the system, with 90,000 annual riders. As compensation, a new pedestrian and bicycle path was constructed from Levanger Station to the hospital.

== From 2020 ==
Norske Tog purchased new rolling stock from Stadler to service the line from 2021 together with the class 93s. These new Stadler FLIRTS are bi-modal electric and diesel or hybrid trains, with a small extra carriage in the middle of the train for diesel motors. The trains run on electric power where there are wires, and on diesel-electric power northwards until electrification, scheduled to start in 2020, is complete.

From the summer of 2020 SJ is operator of all trains.

== Driver’s cab documentation ==
Cab ride recordings on the Trøndelag commuter rail network show local operations around Trondheim, including station stops and winter conditions. Overview:
