= Skatval Station =

Railway station in Stjørdal, Norway

Skatval Station Skatval stasjon
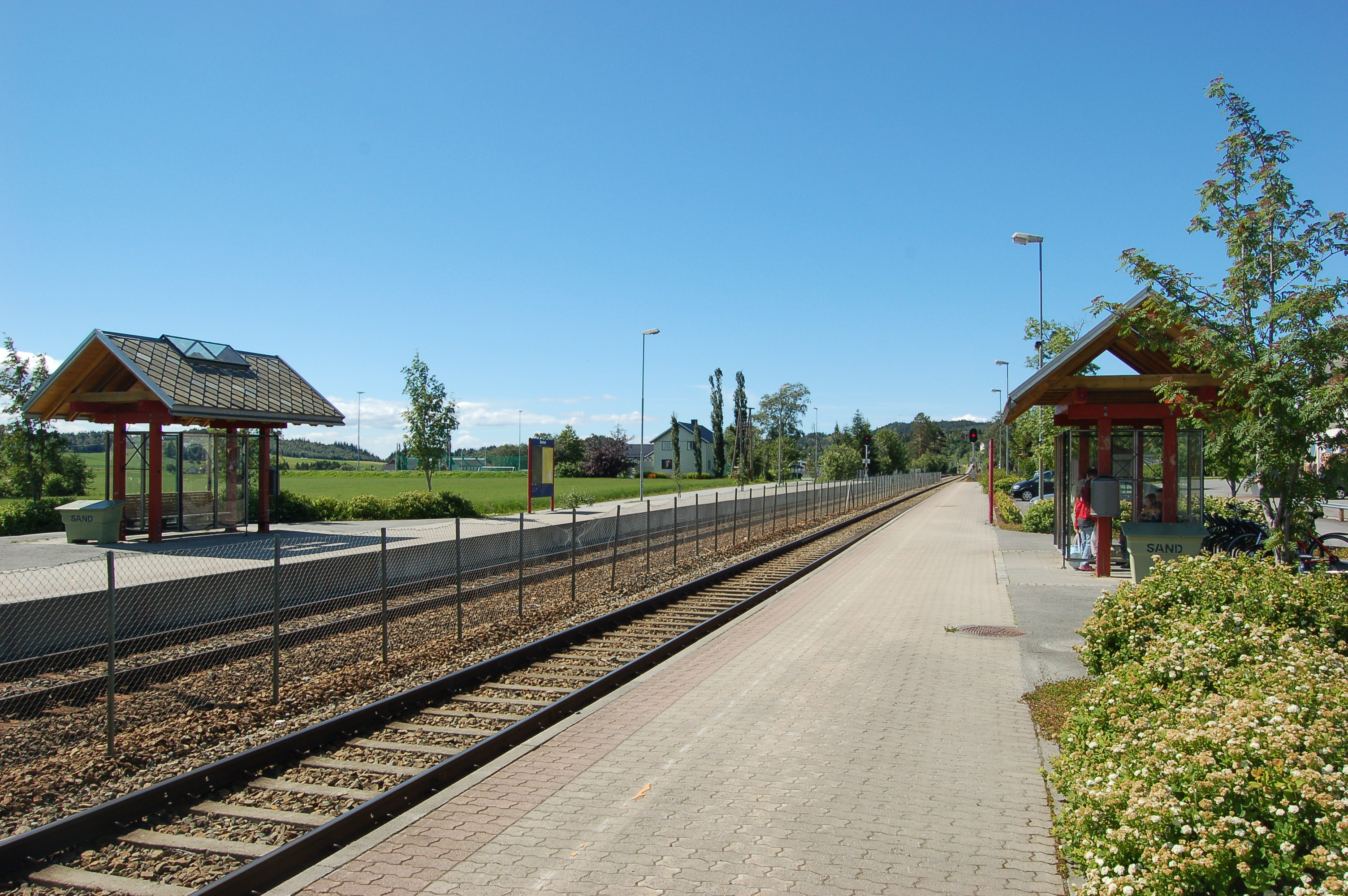
- View of the station

General information
- Location: Skatval, Stjørdal Municipality; Trøndelag; Norway
- Coordinates: 63.508643°N 10.82348°E
- Elevation: 65.9 metres (216 ft)
- System: Railway station
- Owner: Bane NOR
- Operator: SJ Norge
- Line: Nordland Line
- Distance: 41.90 kilometres (26.04 mi)
- Platforms: 2

Construction
- Architect: Paul Due

History
- Opened: 1902
Location
- Location within Trøndelag Location within Norway

Skatval Station (Norwegian: Skatval stasjon) is a railway station located in the village of Skatval in Stjørdal Municipality in Trøndelag county, Norway. It is located along the Nordlandsbanen railway line. The station is served hourly by the Trøndelag Commuter Rail service to Steinkjer and Trondheim. The service is operated by SJ Norge. There is free parking at the station, but no ticket machine.

== History ==
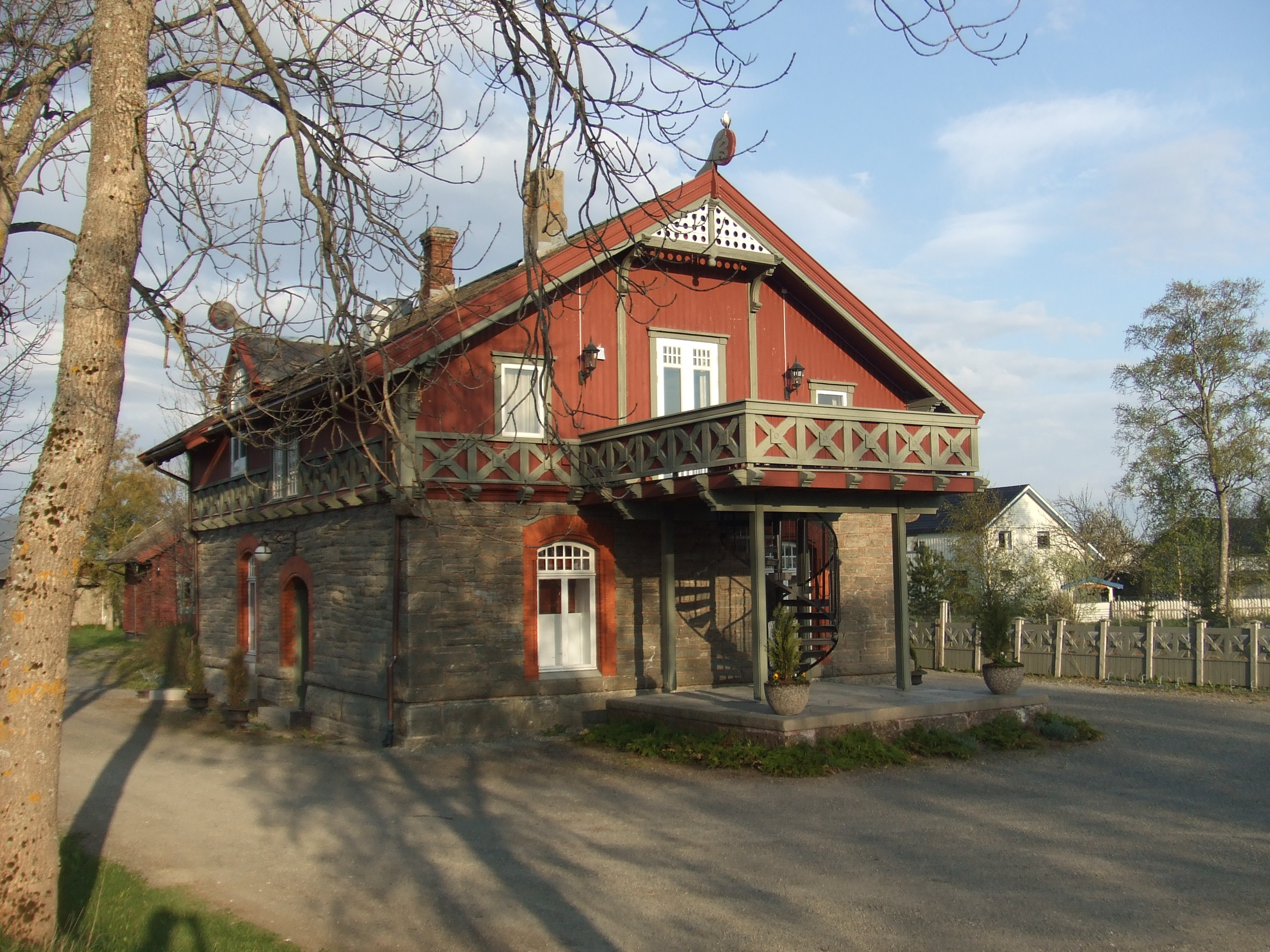
The old decommissioned station building

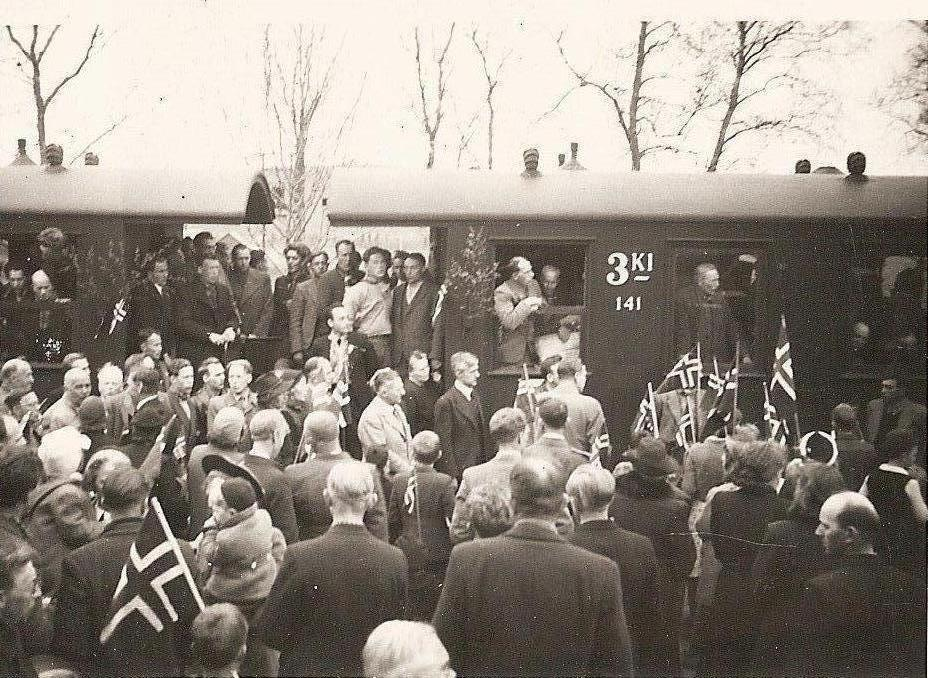
Train at Skatval station on 8 May 1945

The station was opened on 29 October 1902 on the Hell–Sunnan Line between Hell Station and Levanger Station as the section to Levanger was finished. It was designed by Paul Due and was built with a surrounding park. The present station with two platforms is located a few hundred meters away from the old station, and the old station building was taken out of service.

| Preceding station | | Following station |
|---|---|---|
| Stjørdal; Vold | Nordland Line | Åsen; Alstad |
| Preceding station | Local trains | Following station |
| Stjørdal | Trøndelag Commuter Rail | Åsen |
