= Vold Station =

Railway station in Stjørdal, Norway

Vold Station Vold stasjon

General information
- Location: Skatval, Stjørdal Municipality; Trøndelag; Norway
- Coordinates: 63.5033°N 10.8605°E
- System: Railway station
- Owner: Norwegian State Railways
- Line: Nordlandsbanen
- Distance: 39.91 km (24.80 mi)
- Platforms: 1

History
- Opened: 1938
- Closed: 27 May 1990
Location
- Location within Trøndelag Location within Norway

Vold Station (Norwegian: Vold holdeplass) was a railway station on the Nordland Line in Stjørdal Municipality in Trøndelag county, Norway. The station was located in Voll, just southeast of the village of Skatval. It opened in 1938. In 1959, the station was moved 100 meters (330 ft) southwards. The station was closed on 27 May 1990.

Preceding station		Following station
Stjørdal	Nordland Line	Skatval
