= Åsen Station =

Railway station in Levanger, Norway

Åsen Station Åsen stasjon
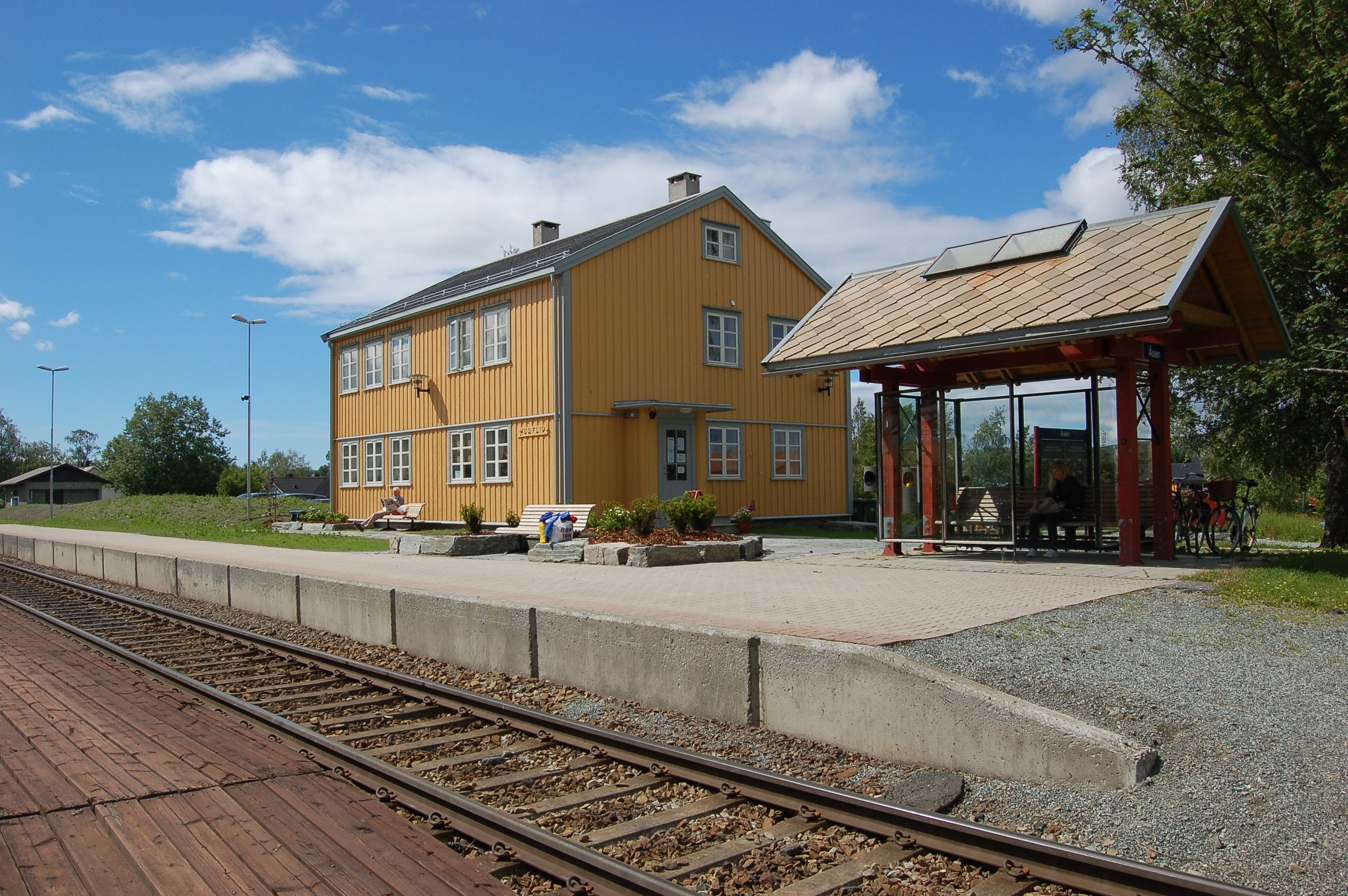
- View of the station

General information
- Location: Åsen, Levanger Municipality; Trøndelag; Norway
- Coordinates: 63.60928°N 11.052026°E
- Elevation: 70.6 metres (232 ft) above sea level
- System: Railway station
- Owner: Bane NOR
- Operator: SJ Norge
- Line: Nordlandsbanen
- Distance: 61.40 kilometres (38.15 mi)
- Connections: Bus: AtB

History
- Opened: 29 October 1902
Location
- Location within Trøndelag Location within Norway

Åsen Station (Norwegian: Åsen stasjon) is a railway station located in the village of Åsen in Levanger Municipality in Trøndelag county, Norway. It is located on the Nordland Line. The station is served hourly by SJ Norge's Trøndelag Commuter Rail service to Steinkjer and Trondheim. The station also serves Frosta Municipality via bus routes provided by AtB.

== History ==
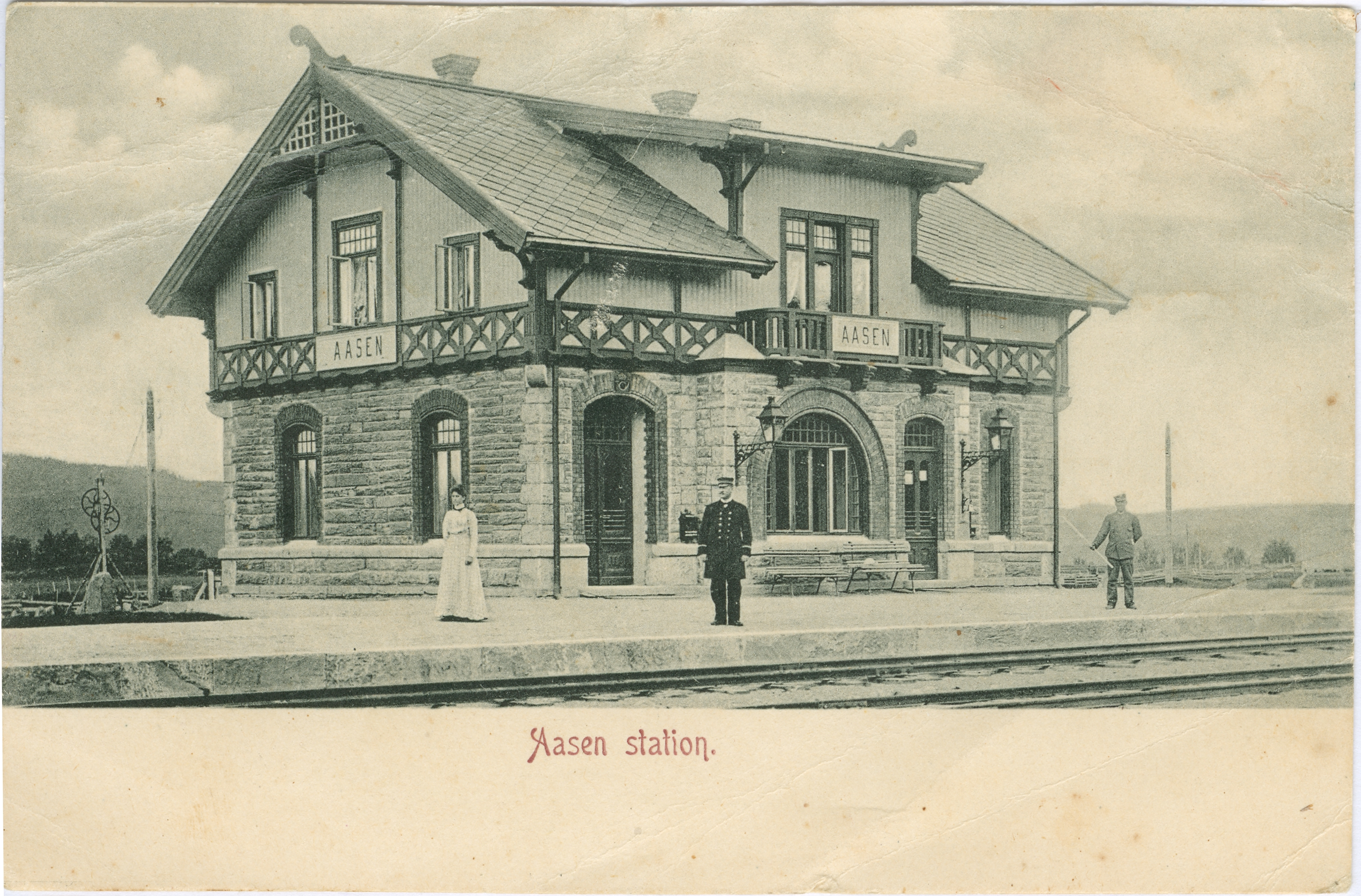
Åsen Station just after construction. (Åsen Museum og Historielag)

The station was opened as Aasen on 29 October 1902 on the Hell–Sunnan Line railway line between Hell Station and Levanger Station as the section to Levanger was finished. Åsen was designed by architect Paul Due and was built with a surrounding park. In April 1921, the name of the station was changed to the current Åsen. The current building is from 1944, but it is no longer used by the railway.

The station building was completely renovated in 2009, both inside and out. The station's 1st floor is home to the local business Åsenvøgga, that sell locally produced goods such as knitted products and various other hand-made crafts.

The stations platform was extended in 2020, to accommodate new passenger trains used on the Nordland line.

Preceding station		Following station
Skatval; Vudu	Nordland Line	Ronglan; Hammerberg
Preceding station	Local trains	Following station
Skatval	Trøndelag Commuter Rail	Ronglan
