= Trondheim Airport Station =

Railway station in Trondheim Airport, Norway

Værnes Station Værnes stasjon
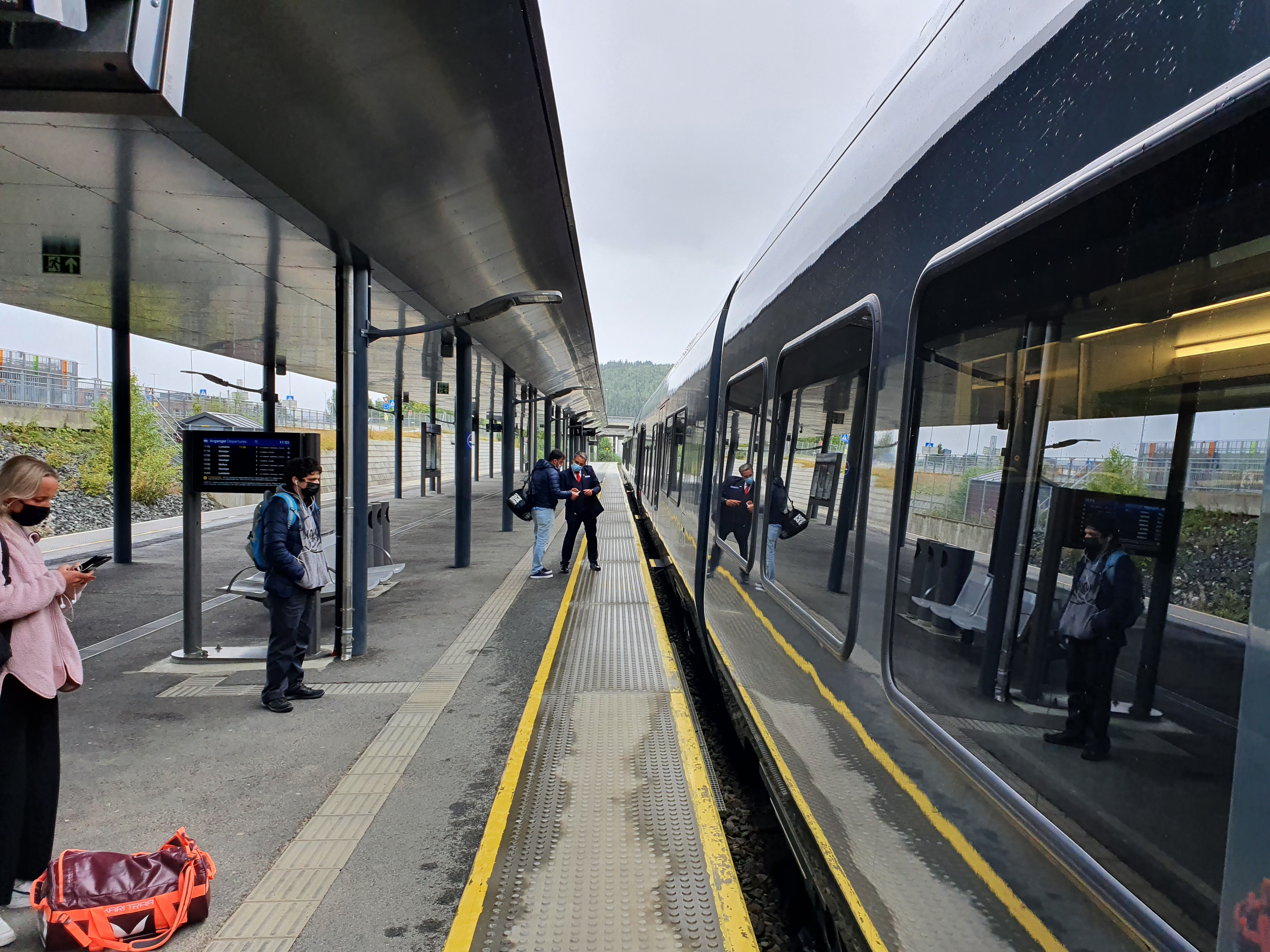
- View of the station

General information
- Location: Trondheim Airport, Værnes, Stjørdal Municipality; Trøndelag; Norway
- Coordinates: 63.454384°N 10.913844°E
- Elevation: 5 metres (16 ft)
- System: Railway station
- Owner: Bane NOR
- Operator: SJ Norge
- Line: Nordlandsbanen
- Distance: 33 kilometres (21 mi)
- Platforms: 1
- Connections: Trondheim Airport, Værnes

Other information
- Station code: VÆR
- IATA code: TRD

History
- Opened: 15 November 1994
Location
- Location within Trøndelag Location within Norway

Trondheim Airport Station (IATA code: TRD), also known as Værnes Station (Norwegian: Værnes holdeplass), is a railway station located within the terminal complex of Trondheim Airport, Værnes in Stjørdal Municipality in Trøndelag county, Norway. Situated on the Nordland Line, it serves both express trains and the Trøndelag Commuter Rail both operated by the state-owned company SJ Norge. The station was opened on 15 November 1994 along with a new terminal at the airport, making it the first airport rail link in the Nordic countries. The station cost 24 million kr, and was built along the existing railway line. In each direction, the station handles one to two hourly commuter rail services, and three daily express services. Travel time to Trondheim is 38 minutes, while it is 9 hours and 5 minutes to Bodø. Access to the airport terminal is outdoors, but sheltered.

== Facilities ==
The station is located at the terminal of Trondheim Airport, Værnes. The connection between the station and the airport is outside, but there is a roof for the whole distance. The platform is about 190 metres (620 ft) from the check-in at the terminal. The station is 33.0 kilometres (20.5 mi) from Trondheim Central Station, and located 5.0 metres (16.4 ft) above mean sea level. There is no staffed ticket office, but a vending machine for tickets is located in the airport terminal. Luggage trolleys are available, and the airport terminal offers an array of traveler services, such as dining, paid parking, restrooms, car rental, taxis, retailing, ATMs and kiosks. There is a single track at the station, but built in such a way that it can easily be converted to become an island platform with two tracks. Work on a second track has not begun as of 2014, but there is budget for double track between Hell and Værnes.

== Service ==
SJ Norge operates both commuter and express trains to Trondheim Airport. In each direction, there are three daily express trains, one to Mo i Rana and two to Bodø. One of the Bodø trains is a night train. Travel time to Mo i Rana is 6 hours and to Bodø 9 hours and 5 minutes. The Mo i Rana service is operated with Class 93 trains, while the Bodø services are operated with Di 4-hauled trains.

The Trøndelag Commuter Rail offers hourly services in each direction: northbound to Steinkjer and southbound to Trondheim and Lerkendal. During peak hours, the frequency is doubled. Travel time to Trondheim is 38 minutes and to Lerkendal 51 minutes. Northwards, travel time to Levanger is 48 minutes, to Verdalsøra 1 hour and 2 minutes, and to Steinkjer 1 hour and 26 minutes. The commuter rail was operated with Class 92 trains. Starting 2021, Class 76 electric-diesel bi-mode multiple units have replaced Class 92 in service, allowing for full electric power pending the completion of Meråker Line Electrification project. From the airport, there is connection with local buses operated by Nettbuss. Klæburuten operates an airport coach to and from the city center of Trondheim every ten minutes from 4 in the morning until 9 in the evening. NOR-WAY Bussekspress and TrønderBilene operate a coach service to Steinkjer and onwards to Namsos.

== History ==
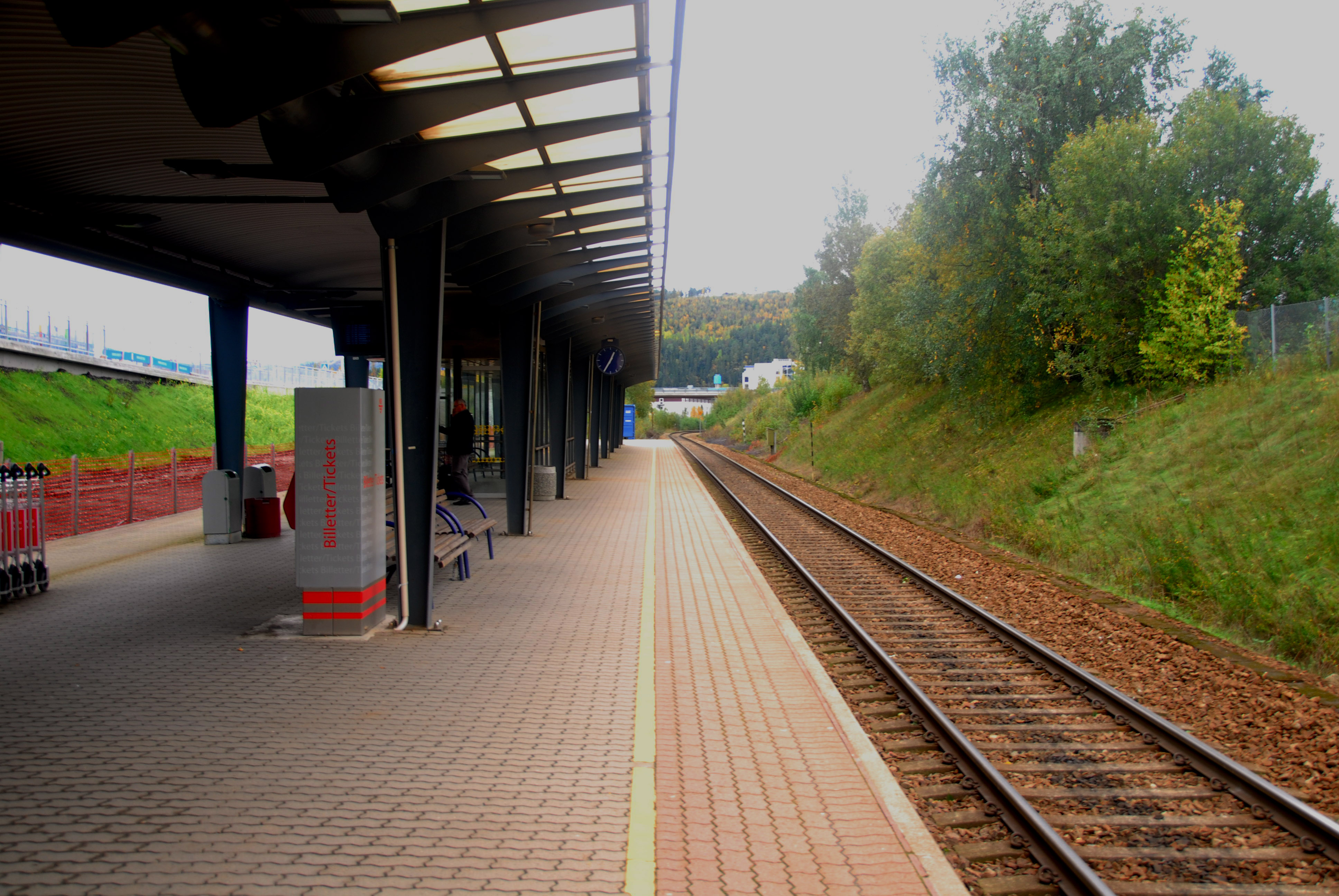
The old platform, looking south

The railway past Værnes opened on 27 October 1902 as the Hell–Sunnan Line—today part of the Nordland Line. The plans for a railway station in the terminal of Værnes were launched in 1990, along with the plans to build a second terminal at the airport. Construction of the new terminal started on 1 October 1992. On 15 March 1993, NSB announced that they would start a commuter train service between Steinkjer and Melhus, south of Trondheim. The service would give a half-hour headway during peak hours between Stjørdal and Melhus, and a one-hour headway onwards to Steinkjer. NSB stated that the concept was based on the success of the Jæren Commuter Rail and that they hoped to have a 70% increase in ridership, in part due to the opening of the airport station. The concept would also take advantage of expansion of Trondheim Central Station that would co-locate the main coach- and train terminals in Trondheim. The service would also give direct services along the Dovre Line to Oppdal Municipality and the Røros Line to Tynset Municipality. Estimates were that the railway would capture a 10% ground transport market share. The commuter rail service started on 1 September 1993.

Construction of the railway station started on 7 April 1994, and cost 24 million kr. The terminal opened on 15 November 1994, the same day as the new airport terminal. Minister of Transport and Communications Kjell Opseth performed the official opening. NSB stated that their primary goal was not to compete with the four hourly airport coaches that operated to the hotels in Trondheim, but instead to provide services to communities in Nord-Trøndelag and south of Trondheim. It was the first airport rail link to open in Northern Europe, with the closest integrated train station at Schiphol Airport in Amsterdam, the Netherlands.

Preceding station	Express trains	Following station
Trondheim S Terminus	F7	Stjørdal towards Bodø
Preceding station	Local trains	Following station
Hell	Trøndelag Commuter Rail	Stjørdal
