= HiNT station =

Railway station in Levanger, Norway

HiNT Station / Røstad Station HiNT stasjon / Røstad stasjon
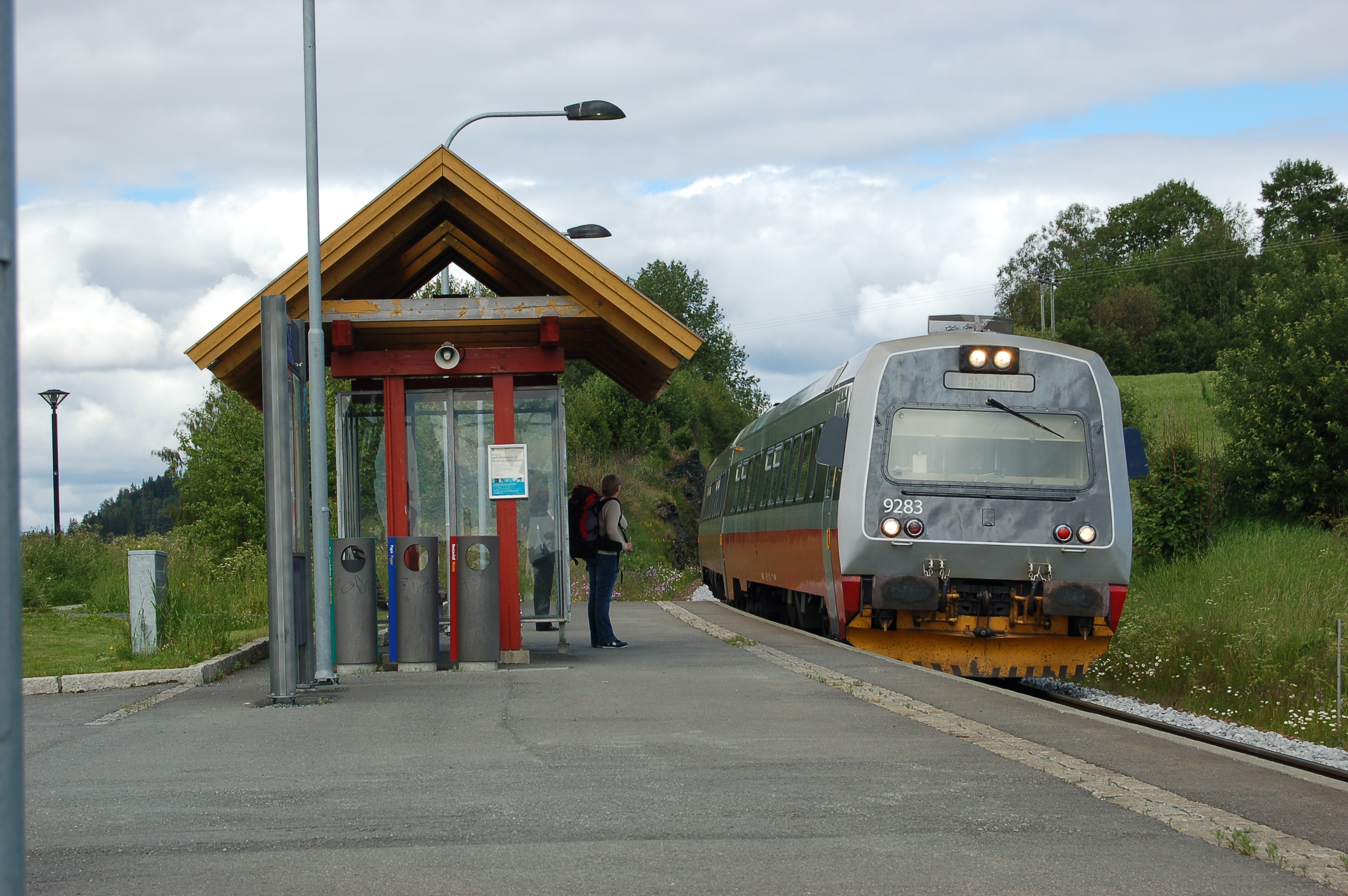
- View of the station with a Class 92 arriving

General information
- Location: Røstad, Levanger Municipality; Trøndelag; Norway
- Coordinates: 63.752572°N 11.318707°E
- System: Railway station
- Owner: Bane NOR
- Operator: SJ Norge
- Line: Nordlandsbanen
- Distance: 85.18 kilometres (52.93 mi)

History
- Opened: 7 January 2001
Location
- Location within Trøndelag Location within Norway

HiNT station, formally known as Røstad station (Norwegian: Røstad stasjon), is a railway station located in the town of Levanger in Levanger Municipality in Trøndelag county, Norway. It is located on the Nordland Line. The station gets its name from being located just beside the Nord-Trøndelag University College (Norwegian: Høgskolen i Nord-Trøndelag) campus at Røstad as well as the Norwegian Food Safety Authority.

The unstaffed station is served hourly by the Trøndelag Commuter Rail service to Steinkjer and Trondheim. The service is operated by SJ Norge.

== History ==
The station was opened on 7 January 2001 after a new large section of HiNT had moved to Røstad and the Trøndelag Commuter Rail was reorganized.

Preceding station		Following station
Levanger; Elberg	Nordland Line	Bergsgrav; Rinnan
Preceding station	Local trains	Following station
Levanger	Trøndelag Commuter Rail	Bergsgrav
