= Stjørdal Station =

Railway station in Stjørdal, Norway

Stjørdal Station Stjørdal stasjon
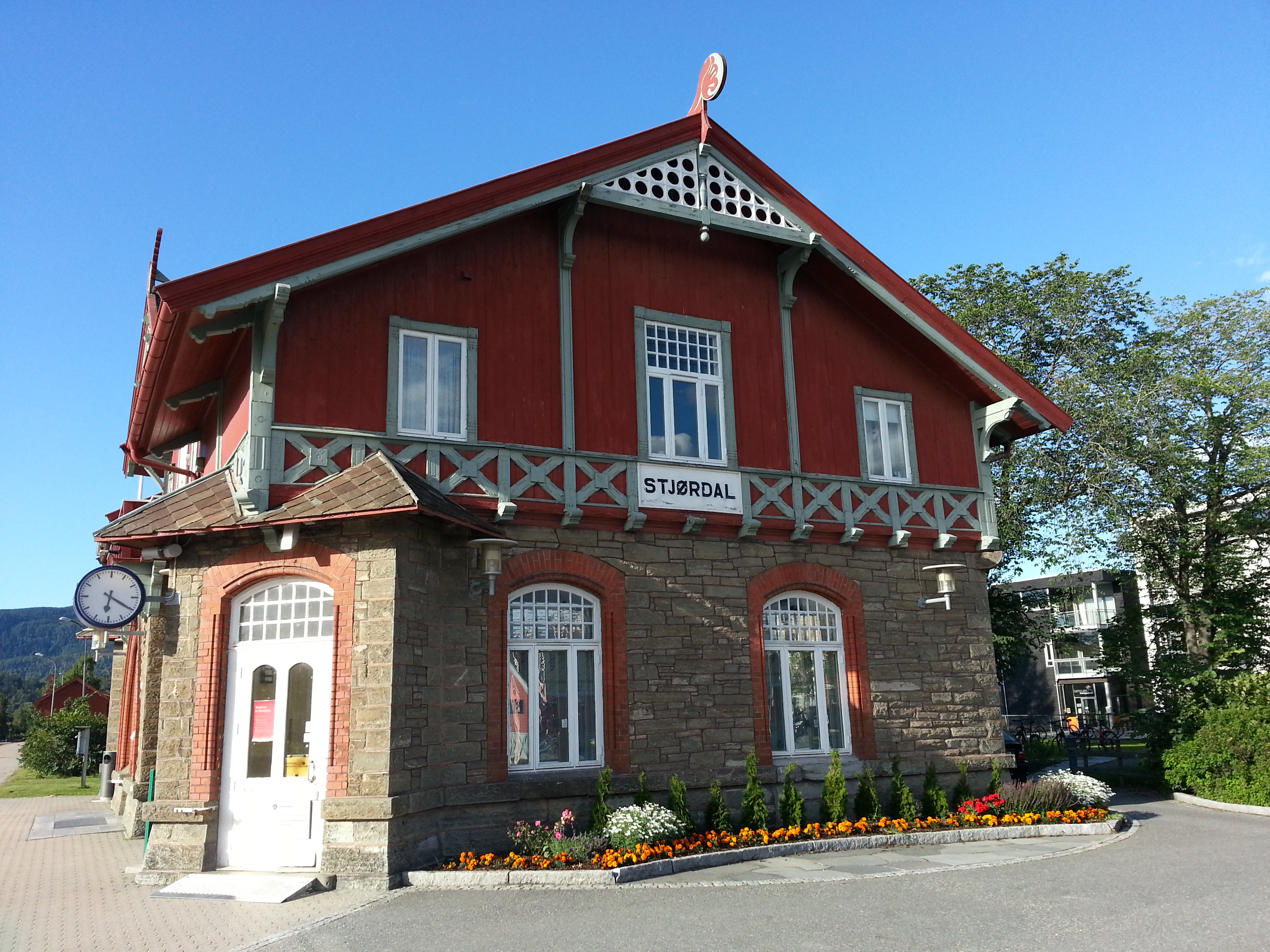
- View of the station

General information
- Location: Stjørdalshalsen, Stjørdal Municipality; Trøndelag; Norway
- Coordinates: 63.4704°N 10.9134°E
- Elevation: 6.6 metres (22 ft)
- System: Railway station
- Owner: Bane NOR
- Operator: SJ Norge
- Line: Nordlandsbanen
- Distance: 34.67 kilometres (21.54 mi)
- Connections: Bus: AtB

Construction
- Architect: Paul Armin Due

Other information
- Station code: STJ

History
- Opened: 1 February 1902
Location
- Location within Trøndelag Location within Norway

Stjørdal Station (Norwegian: Stjørdal stasjon) is a railway station located in the town of Stjørdalshalsen in Stjørdal Municipality in Trøndelag county, Norway. The station is located along the Nordland Line. It is located just north of the intersection of the E14 and E6 highways. The station serves both local and express trains northbound to Innherred and Nordland and southbound to Trondheim Central Station. The Trøndelag Commuter Rail between Steinkjer and Trondheim stops here hourly.

== History ==
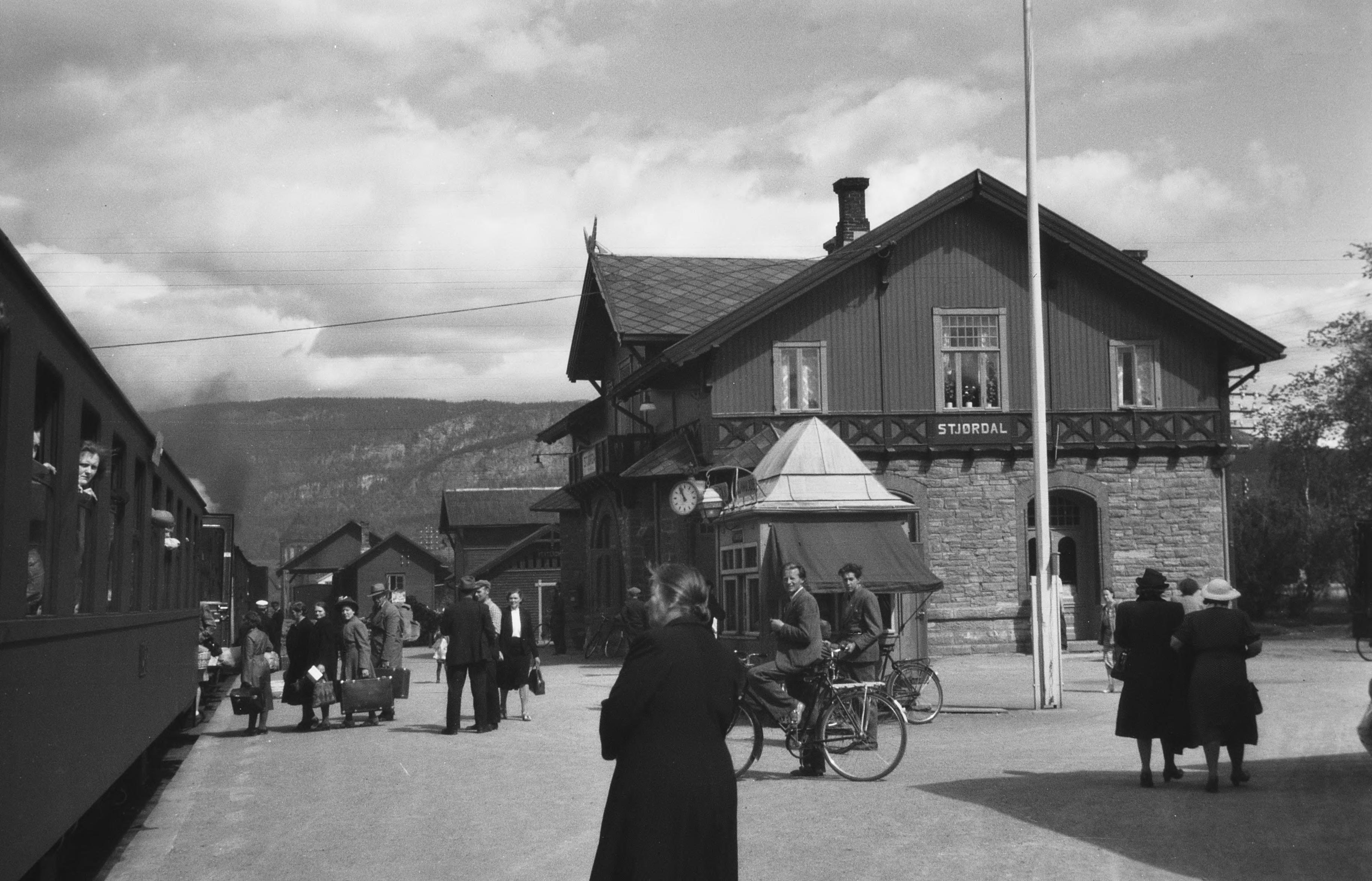
Stjørdal station in the late 1940s.

The station was opened on 1 October 1902 on the Hell–Sunnan Line between Hell Station and Levanger Station as the section to Stjørdal was finished. It was built based upon a design by Paul Armin Due. Prior to 1 June 919, the station was named Stjørdalen, since then it has been called Stjørdal.

Preceding station	Express trains	Following station
Trondheim Airport towards Trondheim S	F7	Levanger towards Bodø
Preceding station	Local trains	Following station
Trondheim Airport	Trønderbanen	Skatval
