= Enafors =

Village in Åre Municipality, Sweden

Coordinates: 63°17′N 12°21′E

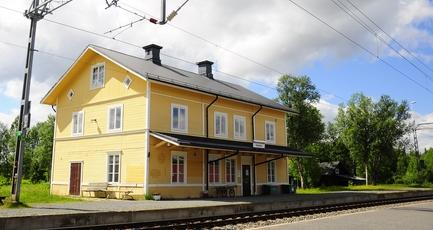
Enafors train station

Enafors (Swedish pronunciation: [ɛnaˈfɔʂː]) is a village in Åre Municipality in Jämtland County, Sweden. The Middle Line runs through Enafors.
