= Vist Station =

Former railway station in Steinkjer, Norway

Vist Station Vist stasjon

General information
- Location: Vist, Steinkjer Municipality; Trøndelag; Norway
- Coordinates: 63.9629988°N 11.411619°E
- System: Railway station
- Owner: Norwegian State Railways
- Line: Nordlandsbanen
- Platforms: 1

Construction
- Architect: Paul Armin Due

History
- Opened: 15 November 1905
- Closed: 1990
Location
- Location within Trøndelag Location within Norway

Vist is a defunct railway station located on the Nordland Line located in the village of Vist in Steinkjer Municipality in Trøndelag county, Norway.The station building was razed in 1965 and closed for traffic in 1990. It did not have a residential section and was drawn by Paul Armin Due.

== History ==
The station was built as part of Hell–Sunnan Line and opened 15 November 1905 along with the rest of the line north of Verdal. Though part of the initial plans for the railway were supported by the municipal council of the old Sparbu Municipality, the Parliament decided not to build the station on 5 June 1900 but changed their minds giving the go-ahead on 24 April 1901.
