= Hovin Station =

Railway station in Trøndelag county, Norway

Hovin Station Hovin stasjon
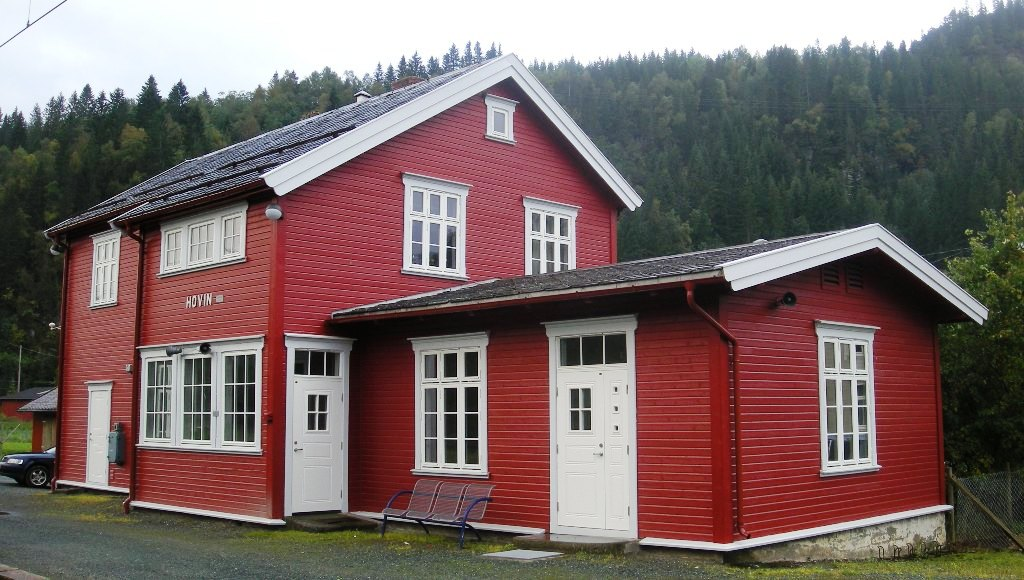
- View of the station

General information
- Location: Hovin; Melhus Municipality, Trøndelag; Norway
- Coordinates: 63°06′01″N 10°13′47″E
- Elevation: 54.8 m (180 ft)
- System: Railway station
- Owner: Bane NOR
- Operator: SJ Norge
- Line: Dovrebanen
- Distance: 507.89 km (315.59 mi)
- Platforms: 1

History
- Opened: 1864
Location
- Location within Trøndelag Location within Norway

Hovin Station (Norwegian: Hovin stasjon) is a railway station in the village of Hovin in Melhus Municipality in Trøndelag county, Norway. The station is on the Dovre Line, about 45 kilometres (28 mi) south of Trondheim Central Station (Trondheim S) and about 507 kilometres (315 mi) from Oslo Central Station (Oslo S) at an elevation of 54.8 metres (180 ft) above sea level. Hovin Station is served by local trains to Røros. The station was opened 1864 as part of the Trondhjem–Støren Line. The Gulfoss Tunnel lies just north of this station.

Preceding station			Following station
Støren	Dovre Line		Lundamo
Preceding station	Regional trains		Following station
Støren	R60	Røros–Trondheim	Lundamo
