= Selsbakk Station =

Railway station in Trondheim, Norway

Selsbakk
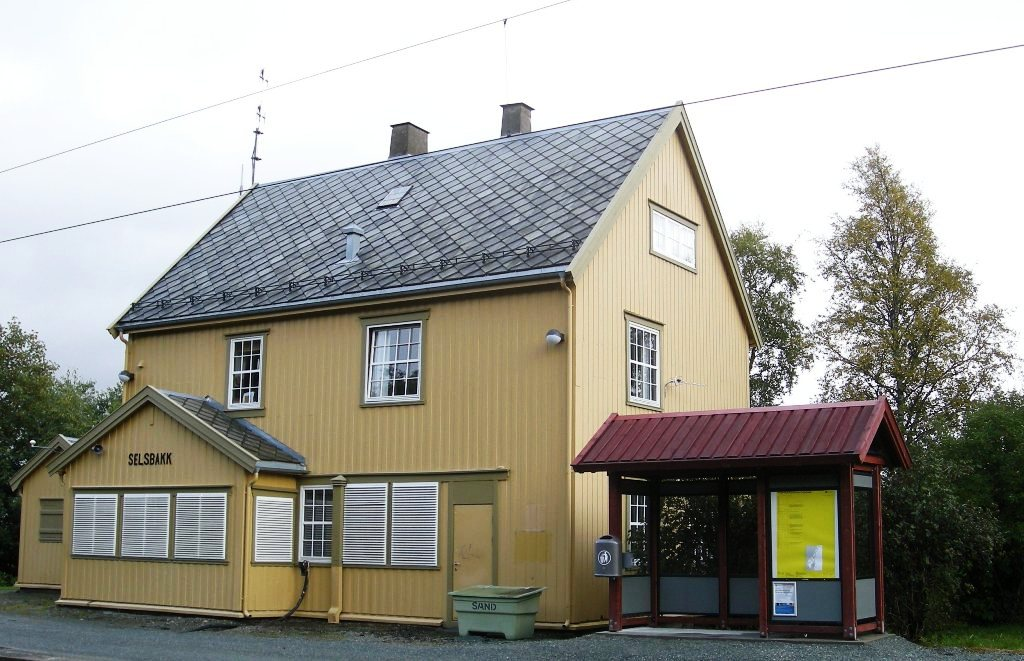

General information
- Location: Selsbakk, Trondheim; Norway
- Coordinates: 63°23′31″N 10°22′40″E
- Elevation: 66.7 m (219 ft) asl
- Owner: Bane NOR
- Operator: SJ Norge
- Line: Dovre Line
- Distance: 546.44 km (339.54 mi)
- Platforms: 1

History
- Opened: 1890
Location

Selsbakk Station is a railway station at Selsbakk in Trondheim, Norway on the Dovre Line. The station is located 6.4 kilometers south of Trondheim S and is served by local trains to Røros. The station was opened 1890 as part of Trondhjem–Støren Line, but moved somewhat in 1919 when it got a new station building when the line was converted to standard gauge and became part of the Dovre Line.

Preceding station			Following station
Heimdal	Dovre Line		Marienborg
Preceding station	Regional trains		Following station
Heimdal	R60	Røros–Trondheim	Marienborg
