= Ler Station =

Railway station in Melhus, Norway

Ler Station Ler stasjon
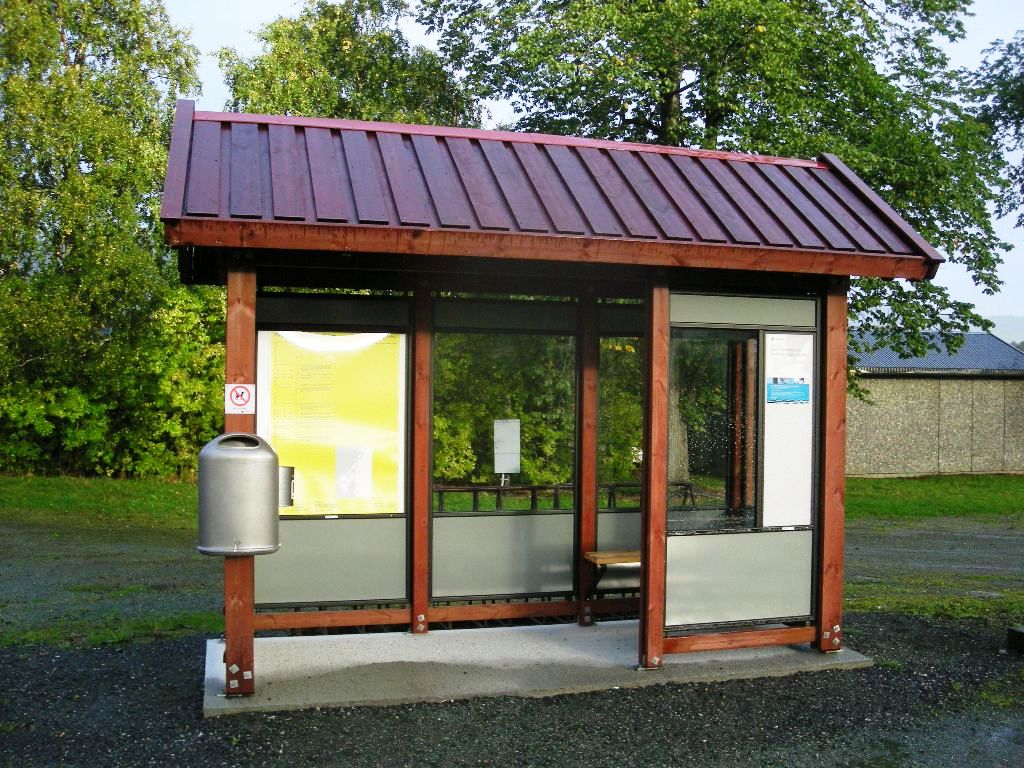
- View of the station

General information
- Location: Ler; Melhus Municipality, Trøndelag; Norway
- Coordinates: 63°11′53″N 10°17′56″E
- Elevation: 26.3 m (86 ft)
- System: Railway station
- Owner: Bane NOR
- Operator: SJ Norge
- Line: Dovrebanen
- Distance: 520.49 km (323.42 mi)
- Platforms: 1

History
- Opened: 1864
Location
- Location within Trøndelag Location within Norway

Ler Station (Norwegian: Ler stasjon) is a railway station in the village of Ler in Melhus Municipality in Trøndelag county, Norway. The station is located on the Dovre Line, about 32 kilometres (20 mi) south of Trondheim Central Station (Trondheim S) and about 520 kilometres (320 mi) north of Oslo Central Station (Oslo S). The station sits at an elevation of 26 metres (85 ft) above sea level. It is served by local trains to Røros Station. The station was opened 1864 as part of the Trondhjem–Støren Line.

Preceding station			Following station
Lundamo	Dovre Line		Kvål
Preceding station	Regional trains		Following station
Lundamo	R60	Røros–Trondheim	Kvål
