= Kvål =

Kvål may refer to:

== Places ==
- Kvål, Innlandet, a village in Ringsaker municipality in Innlandet county, Norway
- Kvål, Trøndelag, a village in Melhus municipality in Trøndelag county, Norway
- Kvål Station, a railway station in Melhus municipality in Trøndelag county, Norway

== See also ==
- KVAL (disambiguation)
