= Lundamo Station =

Railway station in Melhus, Norway

Lundamo Station Lundamo stasjon
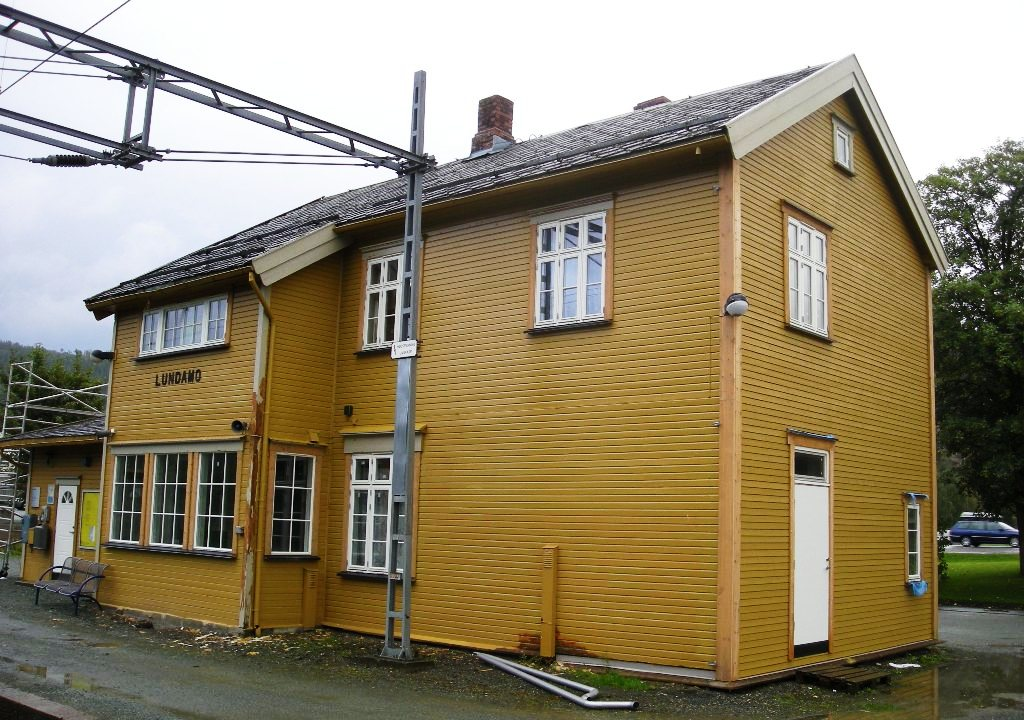
- View of the station

General information
- Location: Lundamo; Melhus Municipality, Trøndelag; Norway
- Coordinates: 63°09′07″N 10°16′51″E
- Elevation: 34.3 m (113 ft)
- System: Railway station
- Owner: Bane NOR
- Operator: SJ Norge
- Line: Dovrebanen
- Distance: 514.78 km (319.87 mi)
- Platforms: 1

History
- Opened: 1864
Location
- Location within Trøndelag Location within Norway

Lundamo Station (Norwegian: Lundamo stasjon) is a railway station in the village of Lundamo in Melhus Municipality in Trøndelag county, Norway. The station is located on the Dovre Line, about 38 kilometres (24 mi) south of Trondheim Central Station (Trondheim S) and about 515 kilometres (320 mi) north of Oslo Central Station (Oslo S). The station sits at an elevation of 34 metres (112 ft) above sea level. It is served by local trains to Røros Station. The station was opened 1864 as part of the Trondhjem–Støren Line.

Preceding station			Following station
Hovin	Dovre Line		Ler
Preceding station	Regional trains		Following station
Hovin	R60	Røros–Trondheim	Ler
