= Kvål Station =

Railway station in Melhus, Norway

Kvål Station Kvål stasjon
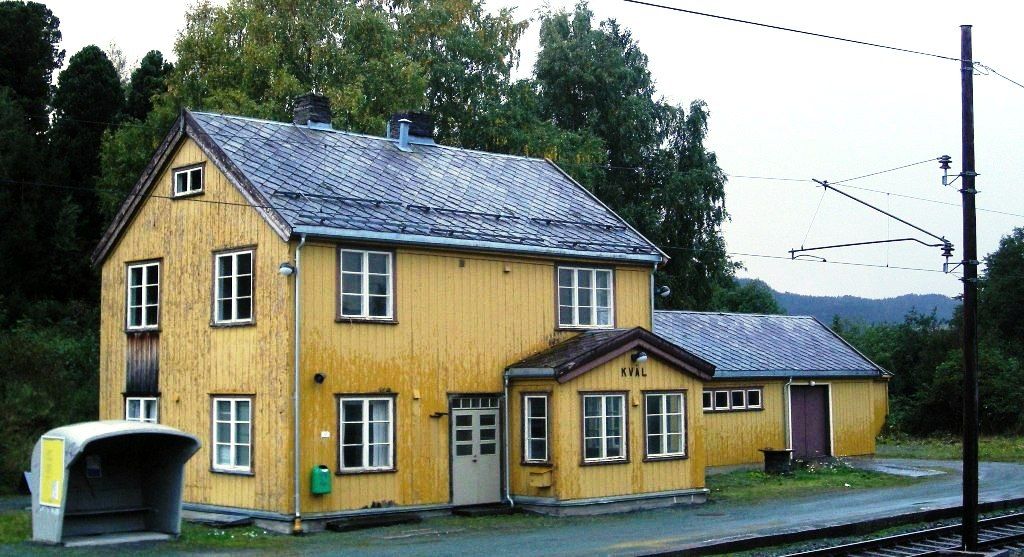
- View of the station

General information
- Location: Kvål; Melhus Municipality, Trøndelag; Norway
- Coordinates: 63°13′57″N 10°16′53″E
- Elevation: 50.3 m (165 ft)
- System: Railway station
- Owner: Bane NOR
- Operator: SJ Norge
- Line: Dovrebanen
- Distance: 525.32 km (326.42 mi)
- Platforms: 1

History
- Opened: 1890
Location
- Location within Trøndelag Location within Norway

Kvål Station (Norwegian: Kvål stasjon) is a railway station in the village of Kvål in Melhus Municipality in Trøndelag county, Norway. The station is located on the Dovre Line, about 27 kilometres (17 mi) south of Trondheim Central Station (Trondheim S) and about 525 kilometres (326 mi) north of Oslo Central Station (Oslo S). The station sits at an elevation of 50 metres (160 ft) above sea level. It is served by local trains to Røros Station. The station was opened 1864 as part of the Trondhjem–Støren Line.

Preceding station			Following station
Ler	Dovre Line		Melhus
Preceding station	Regional trains		Following station
Ler	R60	Røros–Trondheim	Melhus
