= Støren Station =

Railway station in Midtre Gauldal, Norway

Støren Station Støren stasjon
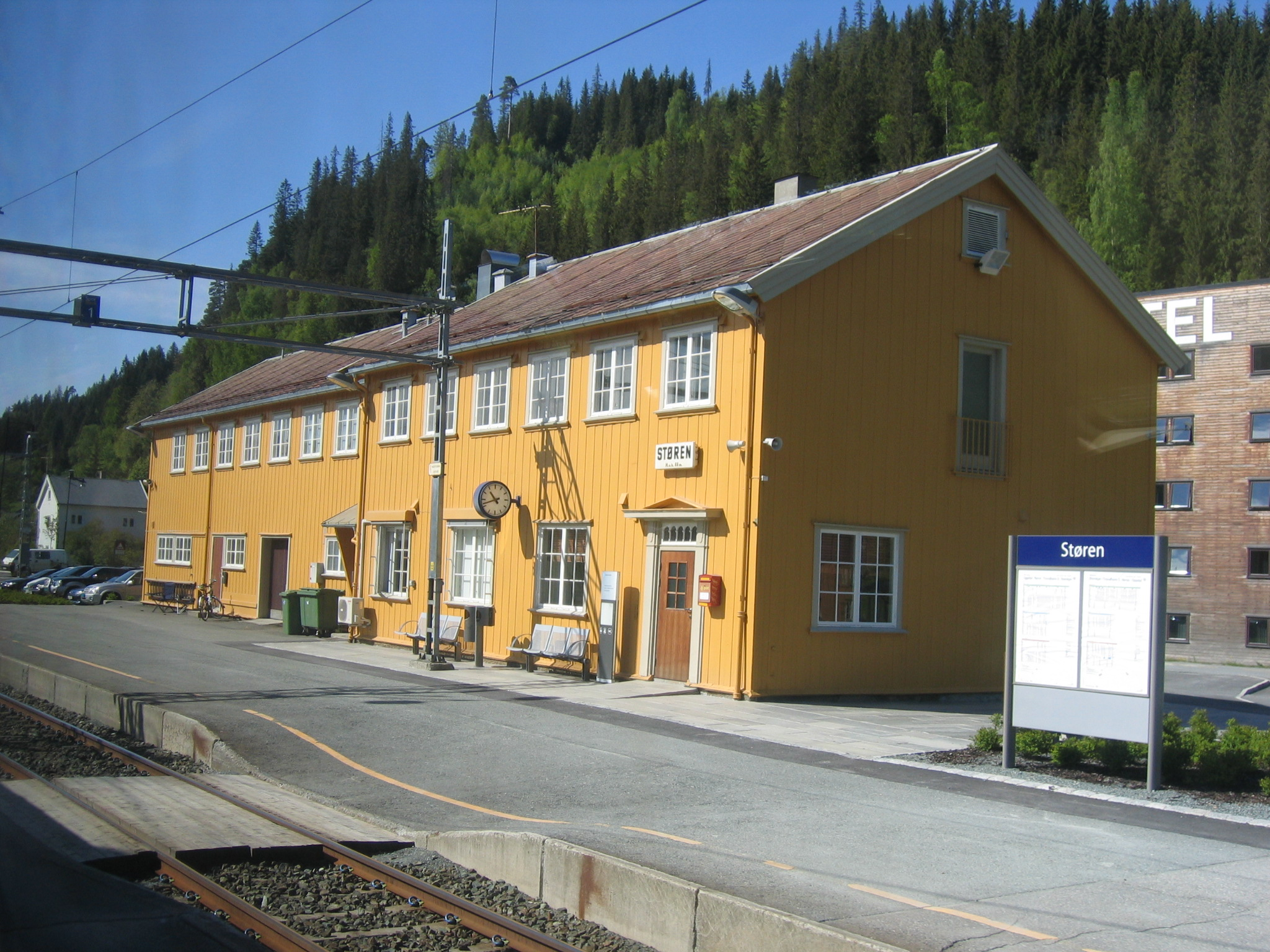
- View of the station

General information
- Location: Støren, Midtre Gauldal Municipality; Norway
- Coordinates: 63.0522°N 10.2850°E
- Elevation: 66 m (217 ft)
- System: Railway station
- Owner: Bane NOR
- Operator: Bane NOR
- Lines: Dovrebanen and Rørosbanen
- Distance: 501.2 km (311.4 mi)
- Connections: Bus: AtB

Other information
- Station code: STØ

History
- Opened: 1864
Location
- Location within Trøndelag Location within Norway

Støren Station (Norwegian: Støren stasjon) is a railway station located in the village of Støren in Midtre Gauldal Municipality in Trøndelag county, Norway. The station is located at the split between the Dovre Line and the Røros Line, with the former heading south via Gudbrandsdalen to Eastern Norway while the latter heads down Østerdalen to Eastern Norway. Going northwards, the Dovre Line continues to the city of Trondheim, located 52 kilometres (32 mi) to the north. The distance to Oslo via Dovre is 501.20 kilometres (311.43 mi) and via Røros it is 510.37 kilometres (317.13 mi). Støren is served by regional trains on the Røros Line and express trains on the Dovre Line by SJ Norge.

== History ==
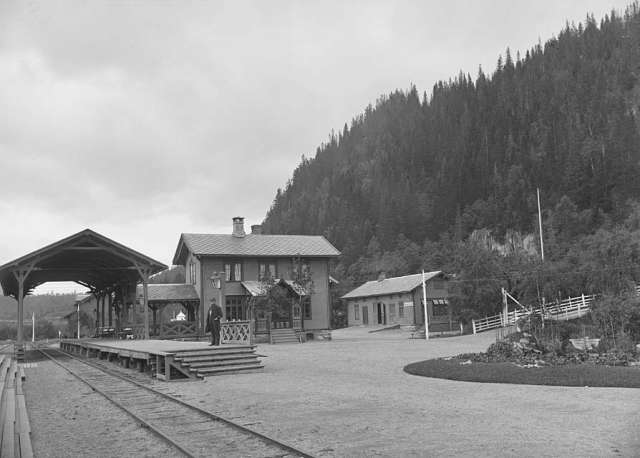
Støren station, 1880–1890.

The station was built as part of Trondhjem–Støren Line in 1864. It was connected with the Rørosbanen in 1877 and to the Dovre Line in 1921. At the same time it was converted from narrow gauge to standard gauge.

On 1 May 1922, the restaurant was taken over by Norsk Spisevognselskap. On 26 April 1940, the station was destroyed during the fighting of the Norwegian Campaign of World War II. Quickly afterwards a kiosk was erected, and one year after the original station's destruction, a new station building and restaurant was opened. It was further expanded in 1949.

Preceding station	Express trains		Following station
Berkåk towards Oslo S		F6	Heimdal towards Trondheim S
Preceding station	Regional trains		Following station
Rognes	R60	Røros–Trondheim	Hovin
