= Haltdalen Station =

Railway station in Holtålen, Norway

Haltdalen
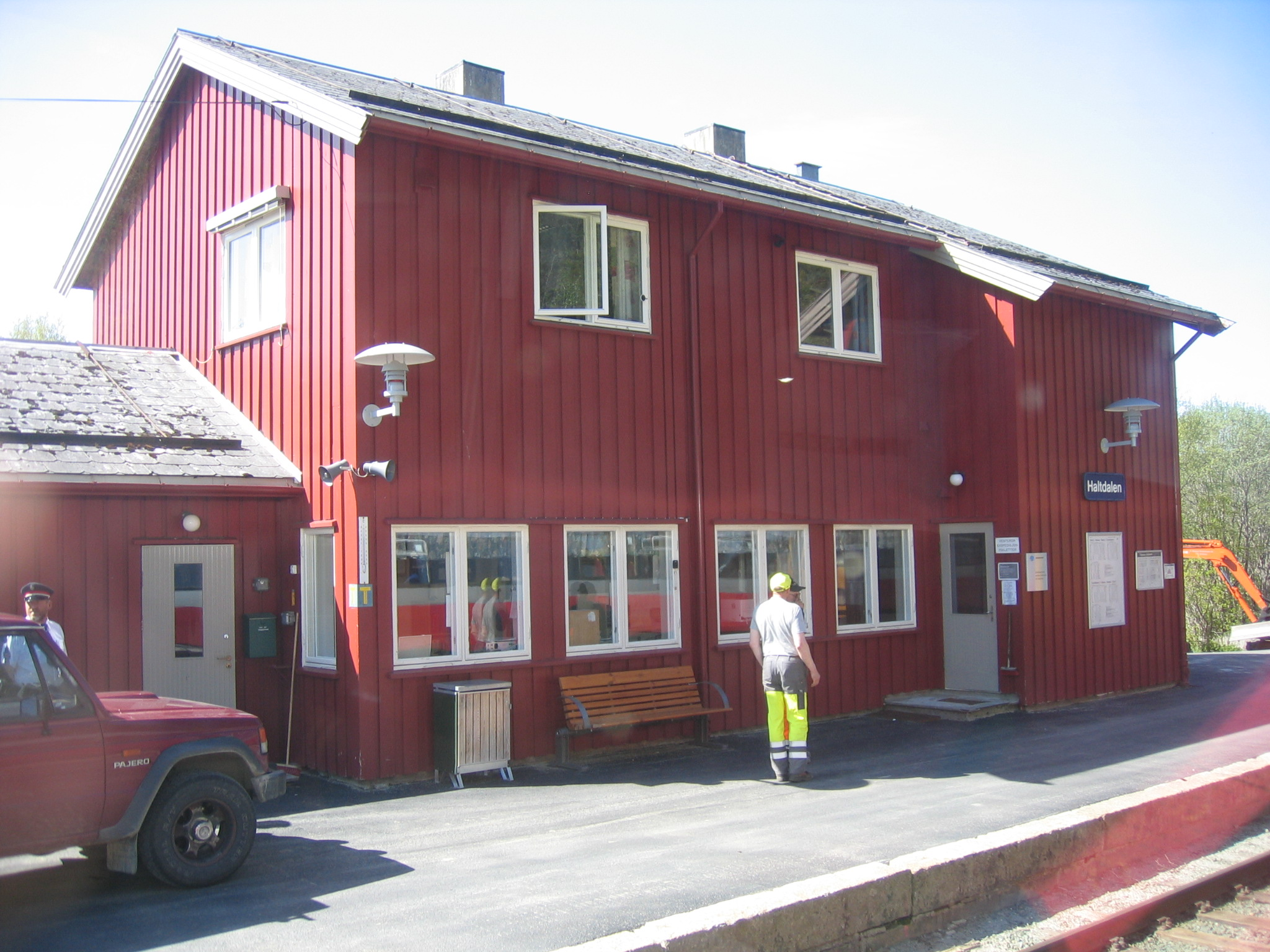

General information
- Location: Haltdalen, Holtålen Municipality; Norway
- Coordinates: 62.9284°N 11.1445°E
- Elevation: 300.5 m (986 ft)
- System: Railway station
- Owner: Bane NOR
- Operator: Bane NOR
- Line: Rørosbanen
- Distance: 453.85 km (282.01 mi)
- Platforms: 2

History
- Opened: 1877
Location
- Location within Trøndelag Location within Norway

Haltdalen Station (Norwegian: Haltdalen stasjon) is a railway station located in the village of Haltdalen in Holtålen Municipality, in Trøndelag County, Norway. It is located on the Røros Line. The station is served three times daily in each direction by the Trøndelag Commuter Rail between the town of Røros and the city of Trondheim. The service is operated by SJ Norge.

== History ==
The station was opened on 16 January 1877, the same year that the Røros Line was completed.

Preceding station			Following station
Ålen	Røros Line		Singsås
Preceding station	Regional trains		Following station
Ålen	R60	Røros–Trondheim	Singsås
