= Heimdal Station =

Railway station in Trondheim, Norway

Heimdal
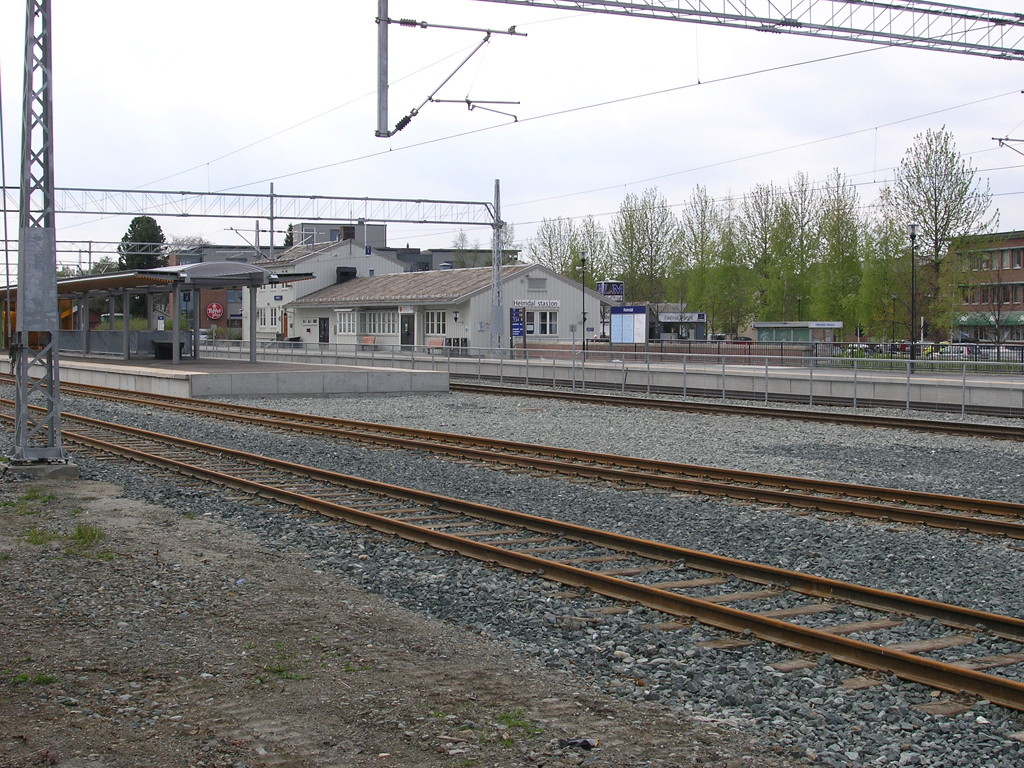

General information
- Location: Heimdal, Trondheim; Norway
- Coordinates: 63°21′3″N 10°21′27″E
- Elevation: 143 m (469 ft)
- Owner: Bane NOR
- Operator: SJ Norge
- Line: Dovre Line
- Distance: 541.41 km (336.42 mi)
- Connections: Bus: AtB

Other information
- Station code: HMD

History
- Opened: 5 August 1864
Location

Heimdal Station (Norwegian: Heimdal stasjon) is a railway station located in Heimdal in Trondheim, Norway. Located 12 km south of Trondheim Central Station on the Dovre Line, it is served by express trains between Trondheim and Oslo Central Station as well as the regional train services Trøndelag Commuter Rail and Nabotåget, all operated by SJ Norge. The station is staffed.

== History ==
The station was opened on 5 August 1864 as part of Trondhjem–Støren Line, and has been reclassified as part of the Røros Line from 1877 and the Dovre Line in 1921. The station had cargo handling facilities, water tower and a pig barn. A new station building was planned from the 1940s, but the current building was not finished until 1960.

Preceding station	Express trains		Following station
Støren towards Oslo S		F6	Trondheim S Terminus
Preceding station	Regional trains		Following station
Melhus	R60	Røros–Trondheim	Selsbakk
