= Lerkendal Station =

Railway station in Lerkendal, Norway

Lerkendal
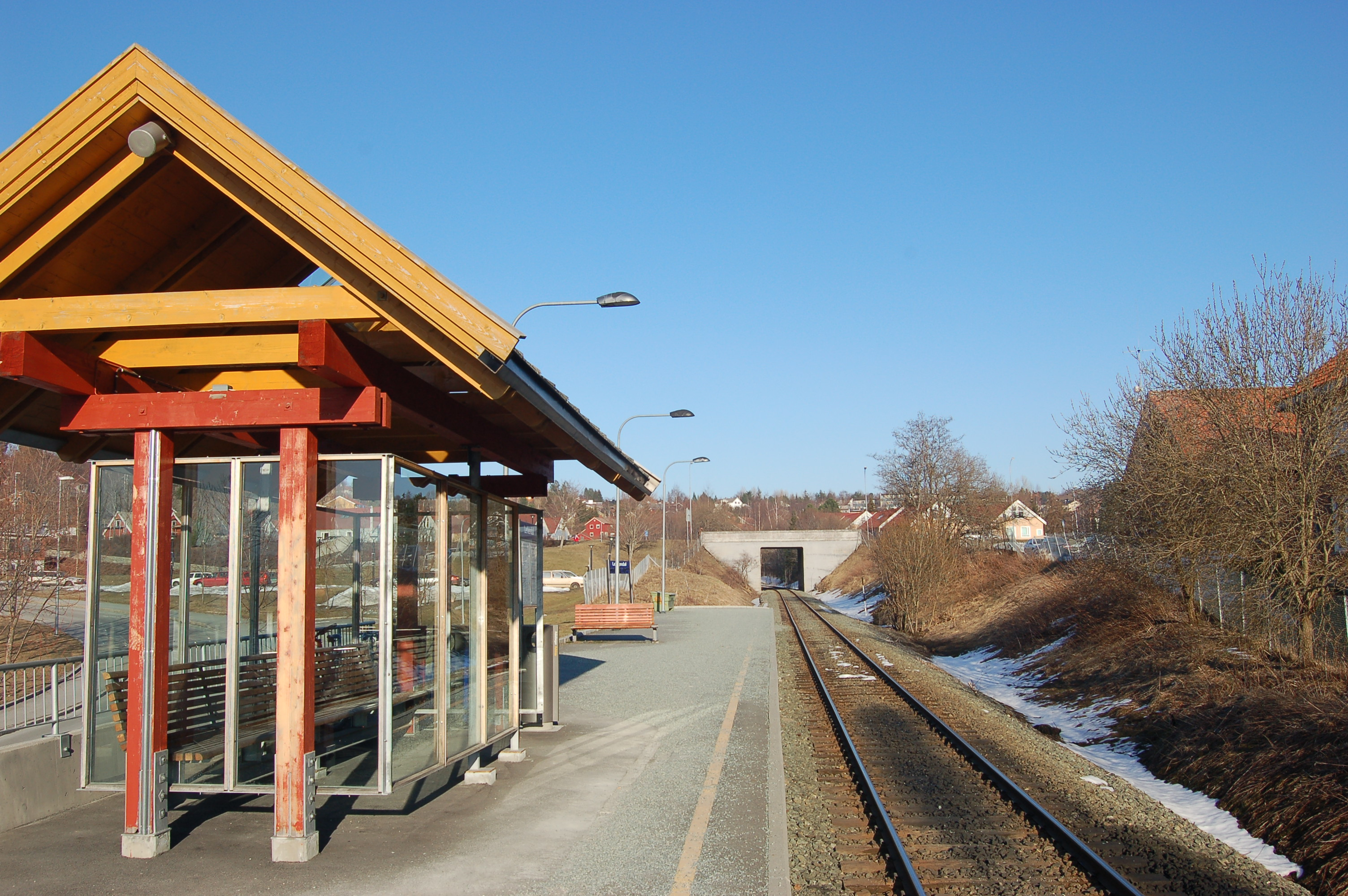
- Lerkendal Station in March 2007

General information
- Location: Lerkendal, Trondheim
- Coordinates: 63°24′49.16″N 10°24′26.33″E
- Owner: Bane NOR
- Operator: SJ Norge
- Line: Stavne–Leangen Line
- Distance: 4.66 km (2.90 mi) (from Trondheim); 550.37 km (341.98 mi) (from Oslo)
- Platforms: 1
- Connections: Bus: AtB

Construction
- Architect: Linje Arkitekter

History
- Opened: 1 December 1988
Location

Lerkendal Station (Norwegian: Lerkendal holdeplass) is a railway station located at Lerkendal in Trondheim, Norway. The only station on the Stavne–Leangen Line proper, it acts as the southern terminus of the Trøndelag Commuter Rail. The station opened on 1 December 1988 and is located in the immediate vicinity of the Gløshaugen campus of the Norwegian University of Science and Technology, SINTEF and Rosenborg BK's home ground, Lerkendal Stadion.

== Facilities ==
Lerkendal is the only railway station on the Stavne–Leangen Line, a bypass line which was built to allow freight trains to bypass Trondheim Central Station (Trondheim S). The station is located 4.66 kilometers (2.90 mi) from Trondheim S and 550.37 kilometers (341.98 mi) from Oslo Central Station. The station is located in the Lerkendal and Gløshaugen neighborhoods, and serves among other institutions the Norwegian University of Science and Technology, SINTEF and Rosenborg BK's home ground Lerkendal Stadion. The station has a waiting shelter, but lacks a ticket vending machines. There is paid parking in the vicinity.

== Service ==
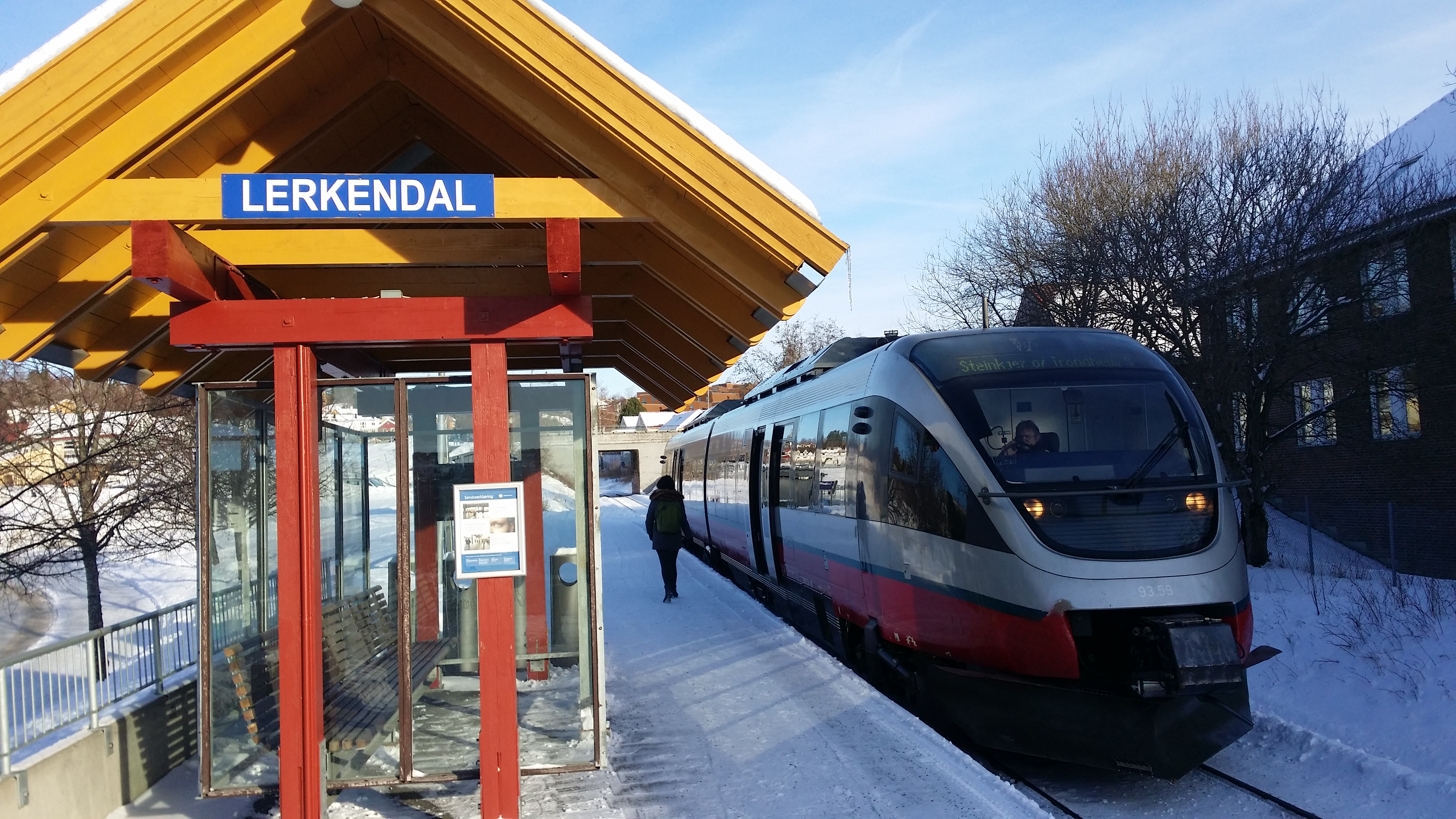
Local train (Class 93) to Steinkjer waiting at Lerkendal Station.

The station acts as the southern terminus of the Trøndelag Commuter Rail, operated by SJ Norge. The station is served by two trains arriving and departing in the morning, and two trains departing in the afternoon. Travel time to Trondheim S is 10 minutes and to Steinkjer Station, the northern terminus, is 2 hours and 20 minutes. All services are provided with Class 92 diesel multiple units.

== History ==
The Stavne–Leangen Line opened on 1 December 1957, and was originally only used for freight trains. Lerkendal Station opened on 1 December 1988, and originally was a terminus station. The Trøndelag Commuter Rail service was introduced from 1 September 1993, and from the same date through trains were operated on the Stavne–Leangen Line, stopping at Lerkendal. The station later received a shelter, designed by Linje Arkitekter and similar to other sheds on the commuter line. From 7 January 2001, NSB made several major changes to the commuter rail. A fixed, hourly headway was introduced on the trains from Steinkjer to Trondheim; including extra rush-hour trains from Lerkendal to Stjørdal, giving 23 departures per day in each direction. South of Trondheim, the service was rerouted to terminate at Lerkendal. The station lost most of its service after more trains were redirected to serve Lundamo and Melhus on the main line.

Preceding station		Following station
Marienborg	Stavne–Leangen Line	Leangen
Preceding station	Local trains	Following station
—	Trøndelag Commuter Rail	Marienborg
