= Skansen Bridge =

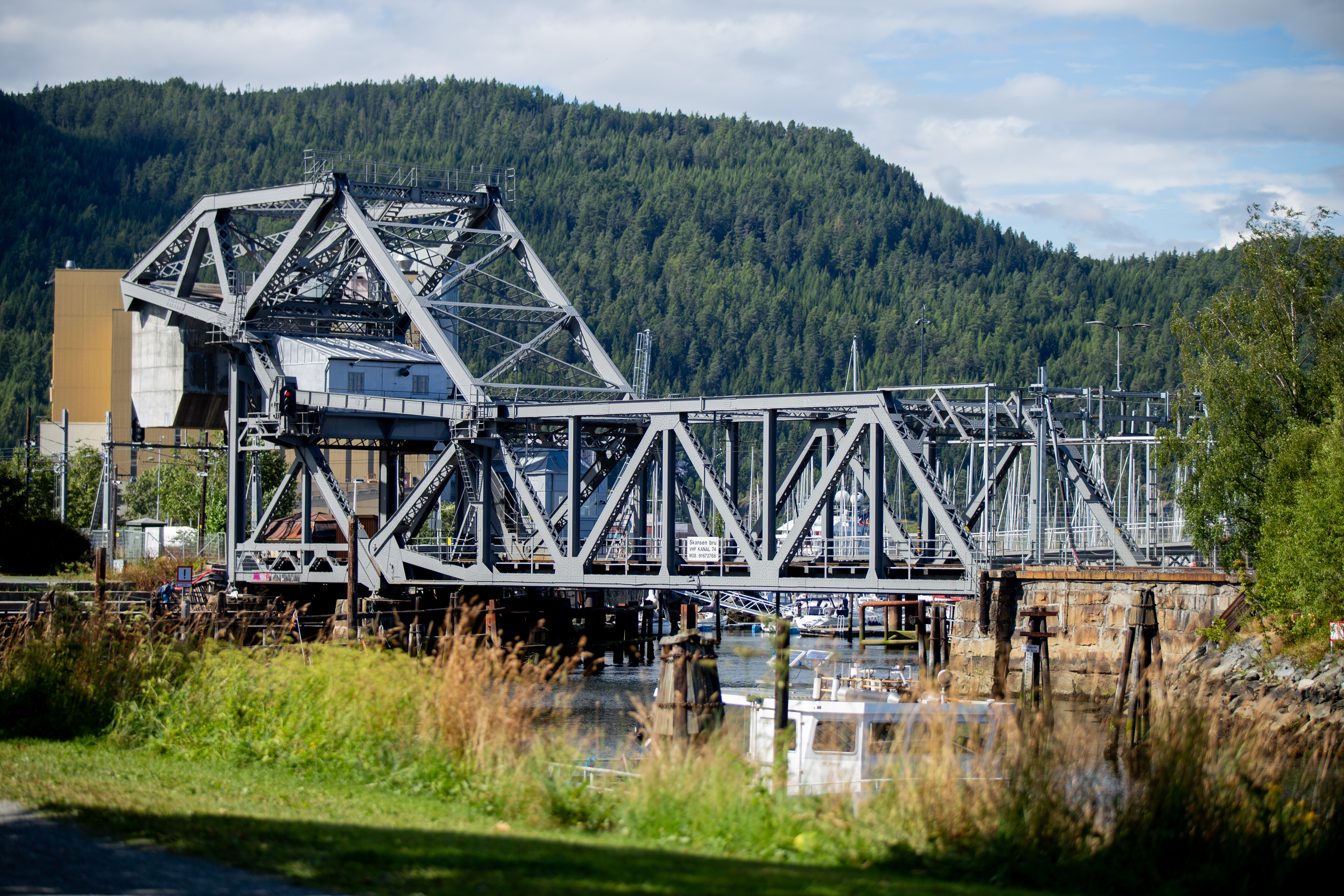
- Coordinates: 63°25′55″N 10°22′48″E
- Carries: Trains
- Crosses: Trondheim Canal
- Locale: Trondheim
- Official name: Skansen jernbanebro
- Maintained by: Jernbaneverket

Characteristics
- Longest span: 52 metres (171 ft)

History
- Opened: March 22, 1918

Location
- Interactive map of Skansen Bridge

The Skansen Bridge (Norwegian: Skansen jernbanebro) is a 52-meter span fixed-trunnion bascule railway bridge located at Skansen in Trondheim, Norway.

== History ==
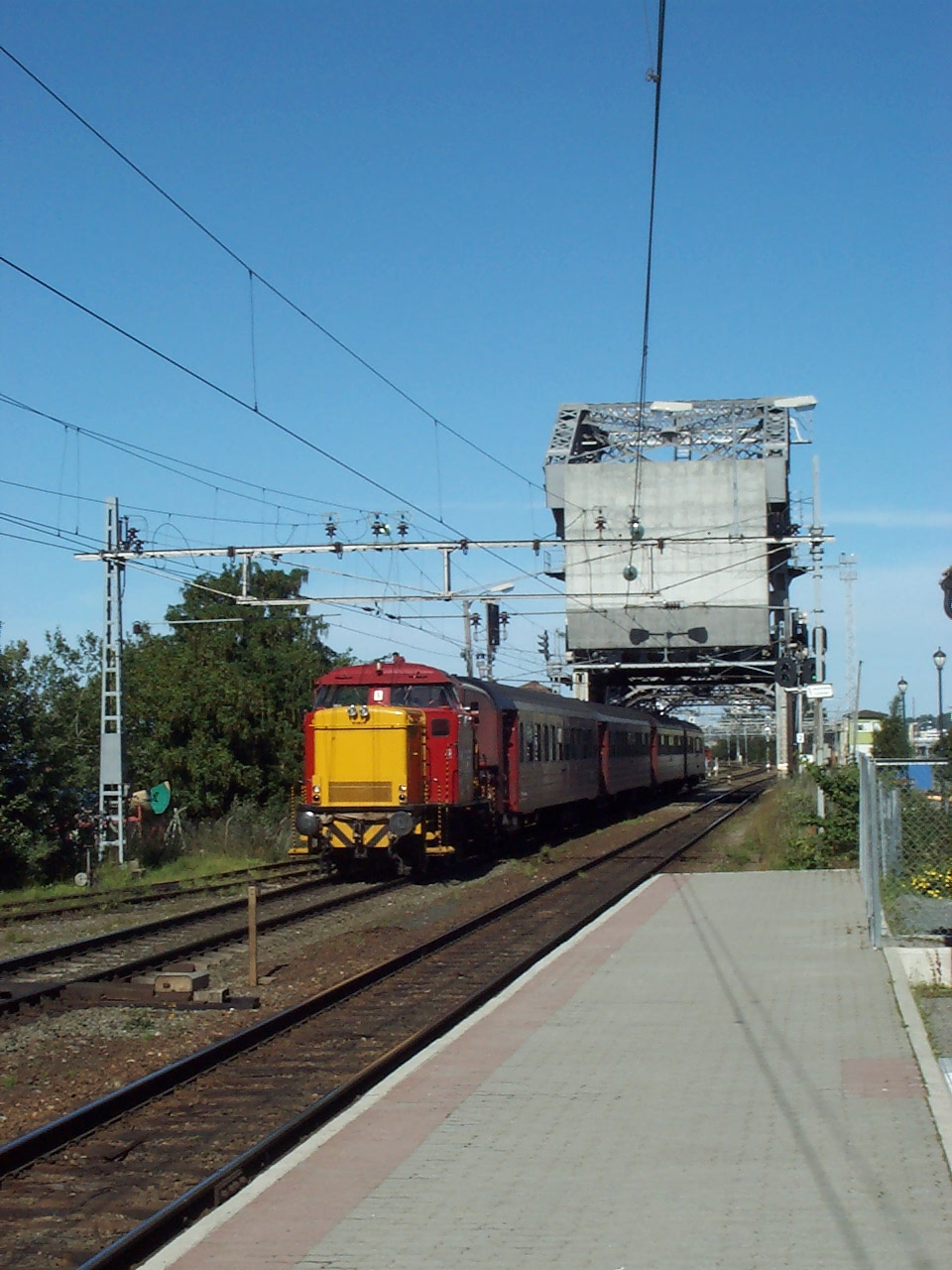
Railroad train over Skansen Bridge

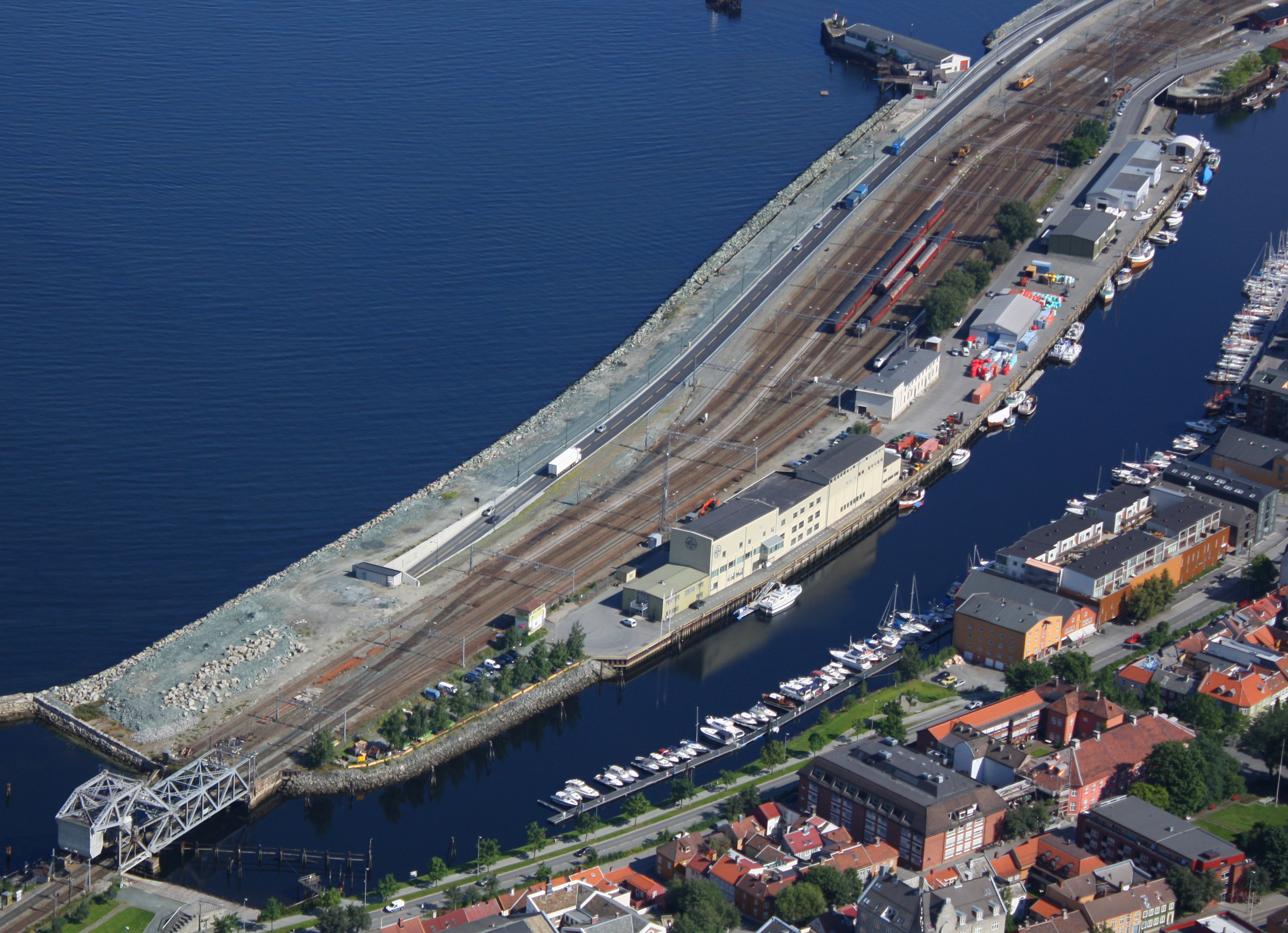
Skansen Bridge on Vestre kanalhavn in Trondheim

The bridge was opened on March 22, 1918, allowing trains on the Dovre Line access to Trondheim Central Station while also being able to open to allow ships on the Trondheim Canal (Vestre kanalhavn) access to the Trondheimsfjord. It was built at the same time the Dovre Line was rebuilt from narrow gauge 1,067 mm (3 ft 6 in) to 1,435 mm (4 ft 8 1/2 in) standard gauge and the stretch between Marienborg and Trondheim Central Station was double tracked.

Skansen Bridge was designed by structural engineer Joseph Strauss, who among other things also constructed the Golden Gate Bridge in San Francisco. The Strauss designed single-leaf iron truss railway bridge with overhead counterweight provides clearance for boat traffic. This type of bridge has a counterweight suspended in a parallelogram, as well as motors and gears to lift and lower the end of the bridge.

In 2006, Skansen Bridge received architectural conservation by the Norwegian Directorate for Cultural Heritage (Riksantikvaren) based upon Skansen Bridge being unique in Norway and only one of a few of its kind left in the world. The conservation includes the entire bridge including construction and technical equipment, the guard cabin and the transformer building. The conservation does not include the railway track, signal equipment or the overhead wires.

== Gallery ==
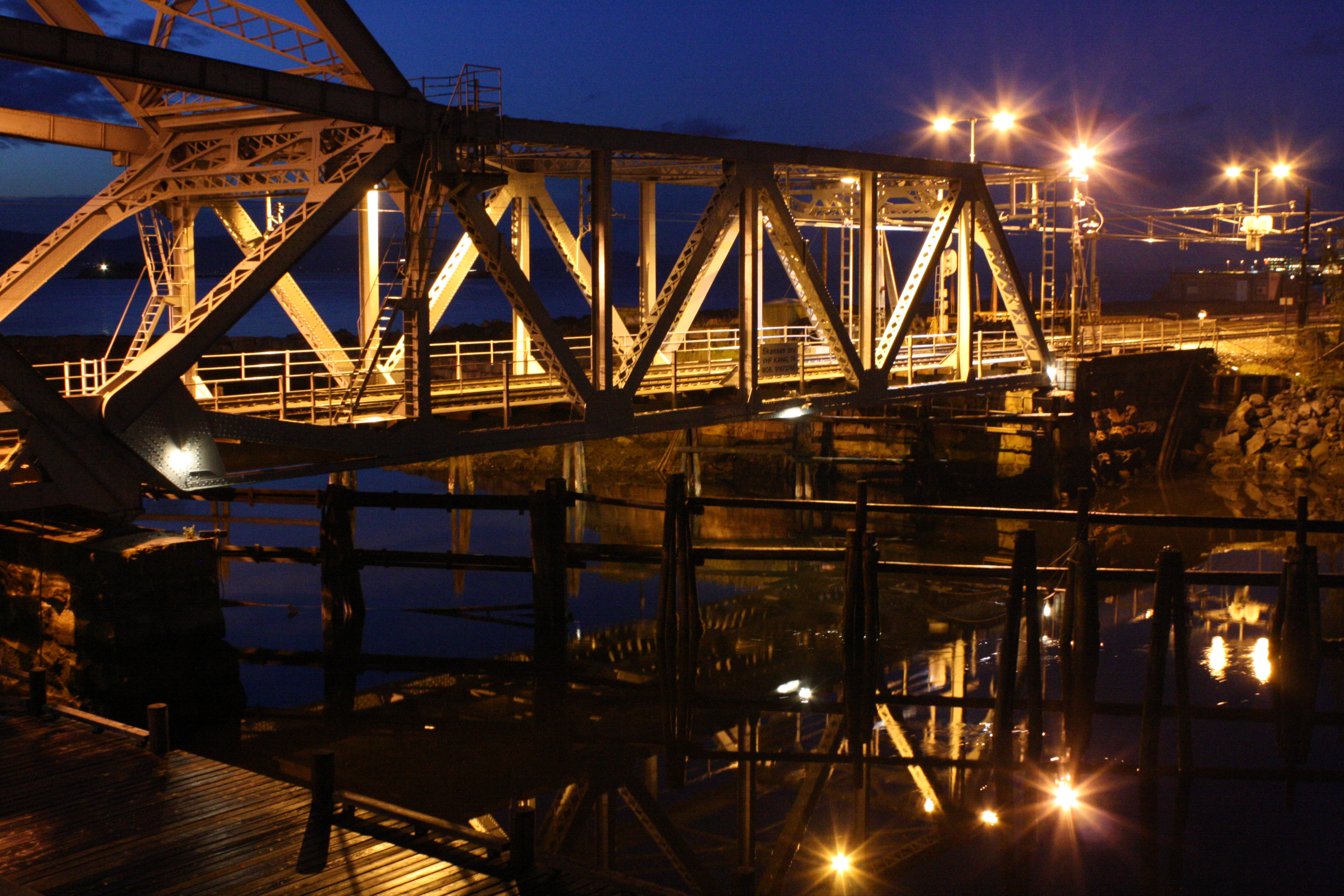
Skansen Bridge with lumination at night

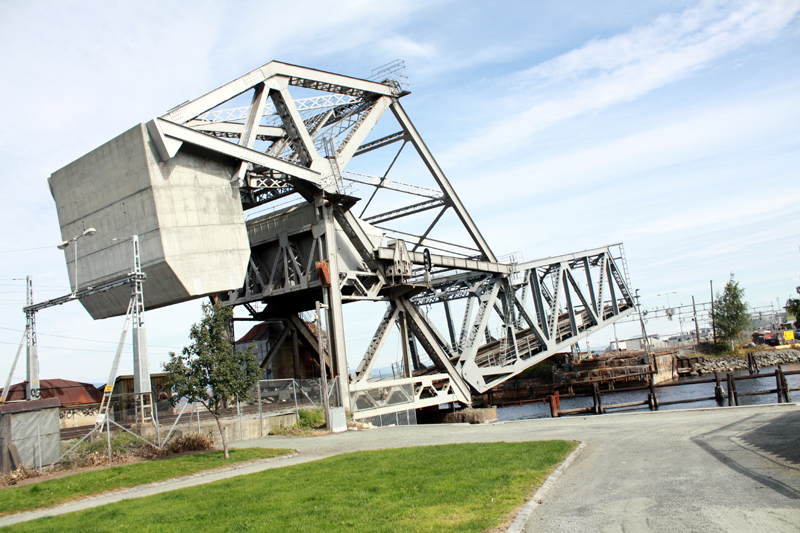
Skansen Bridge in partially opened position

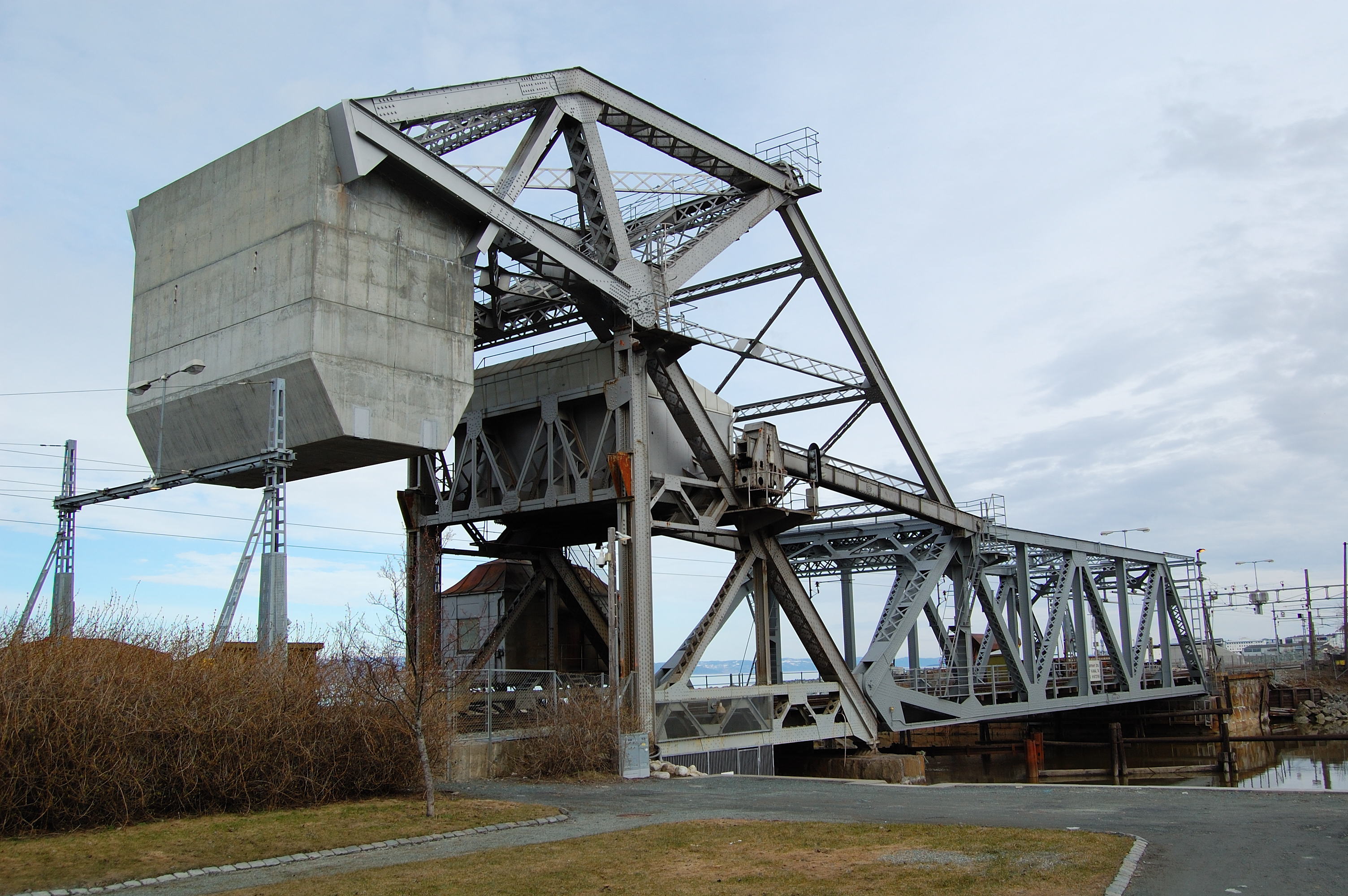
Skansen Bridge in closed position

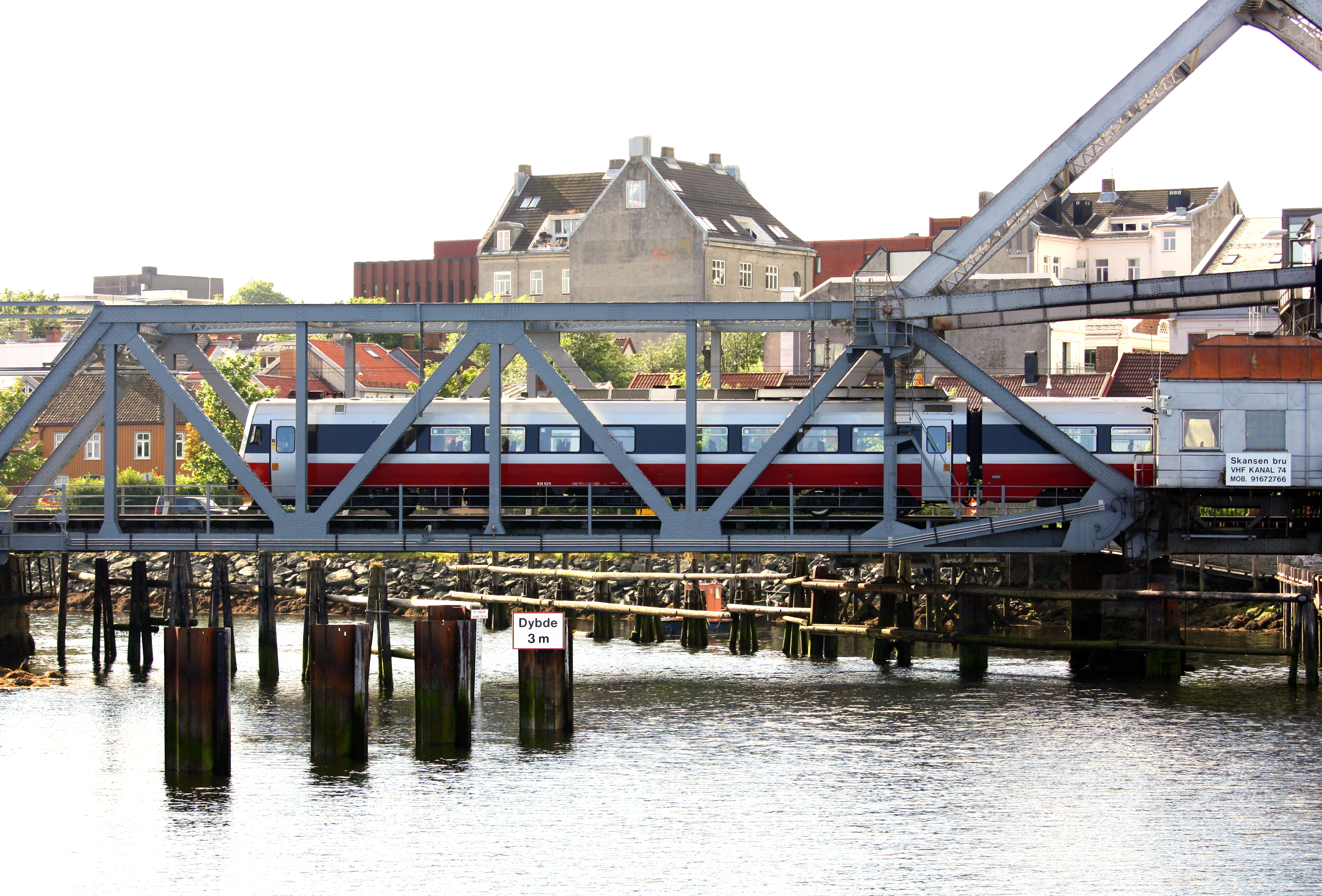
Rail traffic across Skansen Bridge

== See also ==
- Skansen Station
- List of bascule bridges

== Related reading ==
- Koglin, Terry L. (2003) Movable bridge engineering (John Wiley and Sons) ISBN 978-0-471-41960-0
