= Skansen Station =

Railway station in Trondheim, Norway

Skansen stasjon
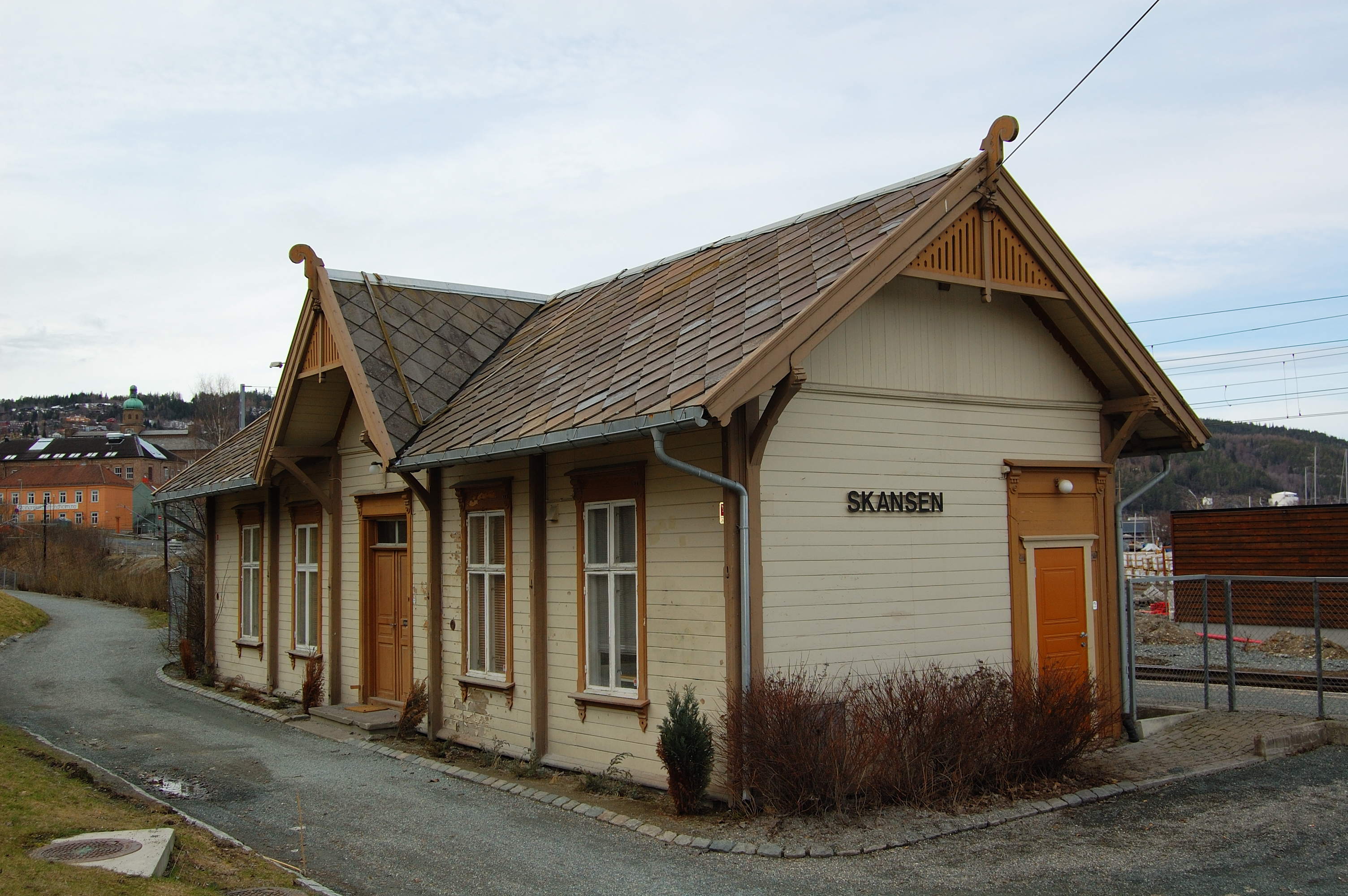
- Skansen Station

General information
- Location: Ila, Trondheim; Norway
- Coordinates: 63°25′50″N 10°22′32″E
- Elevation: 5.0 m (16.4 ft)
- Owner: Bane NOR
- Operator: SJ Norge
- Line: Dovre Line
- Distance: 551.67 km
- Platforms: 1
- Connections: Tram: Gråkallen Line; Bus: AtB

History
- Opened: 1893
Location

Skansen (Skansen stasjon) is a railway station located at Ila in Trondheim, Norway. It is on the Dovre Line (Dovrebanen), 1.20 kilometers from Trondheim Central Station. Service to the station is provided though the Trøndelag Commuter Rail operated by SJ Norge and regional trains to Røros Station. It was opened in 1893. The station is located in a residential area. It is the only railway station in Trondheim to have connections with the Trondheim Tramway. It is also served by city buses.

== Tram stop ==
The Trondheim Tramway's Gråkallen Line stops at a tram stop about 50 meters from the railway station. The tram stop dates back to the original construction of the first tram line in Trondheim, the Ila Line, in 1893.

== See also ==
- Skansen Bridge

Preceding station	Trondheim Tramway	Following station
Ila towards Lian	Gråkallbanen	Kalvskinnet towards St. Olavs Gate

Preceding station			Following station
Marienborg	Dovre Line		Trondheim S
Preceding station	Regional trains		Following station
Marienborg	R60	Røros–Trondheim	Trondheim S
Preceding station	Local trains		Following station
Marienborg		Trønderbanen	Trondheim S
