= Ålen Station =

Railway station in Holtålen, Norway

Ålen
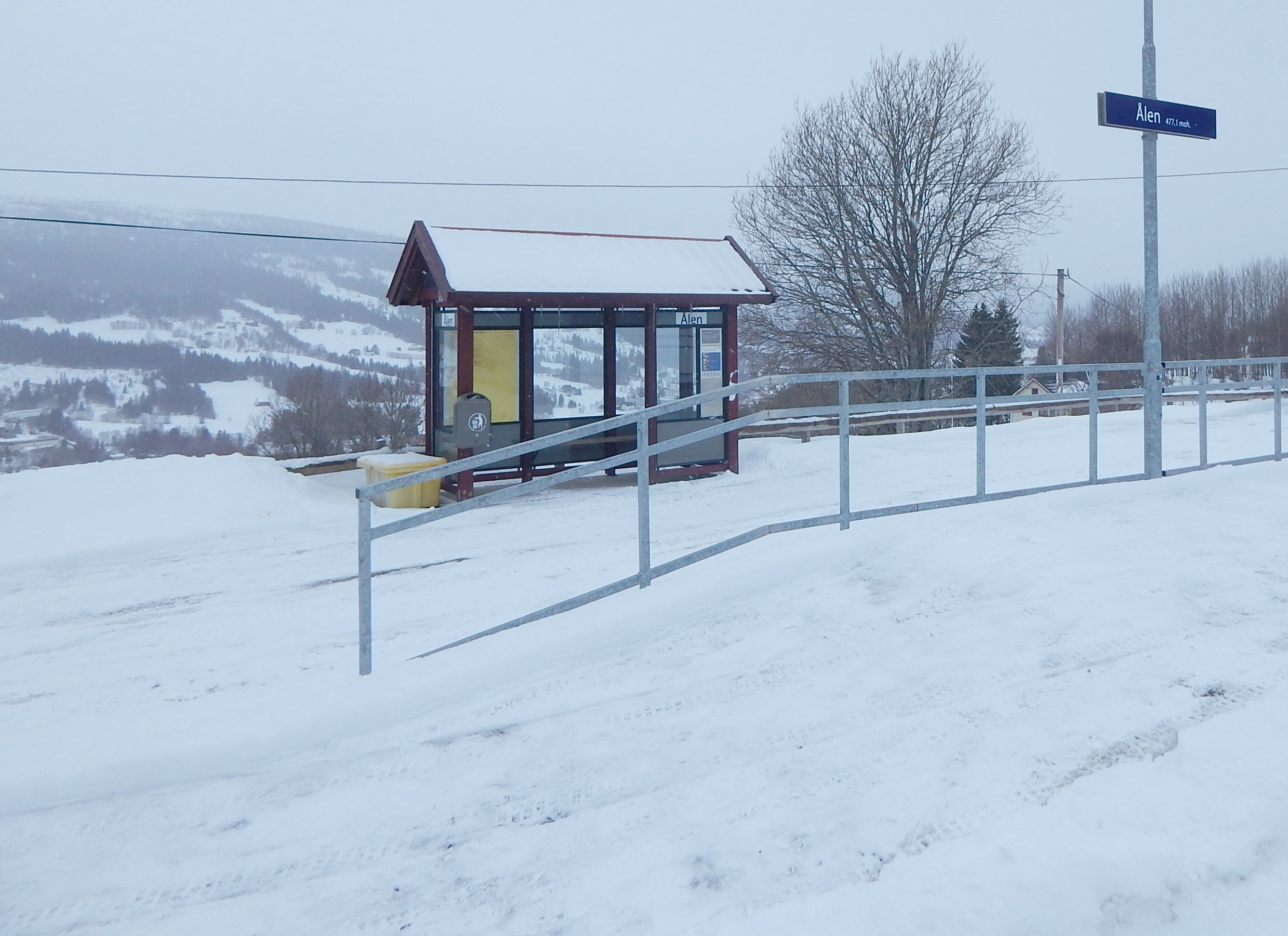

General information
- Location: Renbygda, Holtålen Municipality; Norway
- Coordinates: 62.8468°N 11.3116°E
- Elevation: 484.9 m (1,591 ft)
- System: Railway station
- Owner: Bane NOR
- Operator: Bane NOR
- Line: Rørosbanen
- Distance: 438.03 km (272.18 mi)
- Platforms: 2

History
- Opened: 1901
Location
- Location within Trøndelag Location within Norway

Ålen Station (Norwegian: Ålen holdeplass) is a railway station located in the village of Renbygda in Holtålen Municipality in Trøndelag county, Norway. It is located on the Røros Line. The station is served three times daily in each direction by Trøndelag Commuter Rail between the town of Røros and the city of Trondheim. The service is operated by SJ Norge. The station was opened in 1901.

Preceding station			Following station
Røros	Røros Line		Haltdalen
Preceding station	Regional trains		Following station
Røros	R60	Røros–Trondheim	Haltdalen
