= Trondhjem Kalvskinnet Station =

Railway station in Trondheim, Norway

Coordinates: 63°25′35″N 10°23′34″E

Trondhjem Kalvskinnet
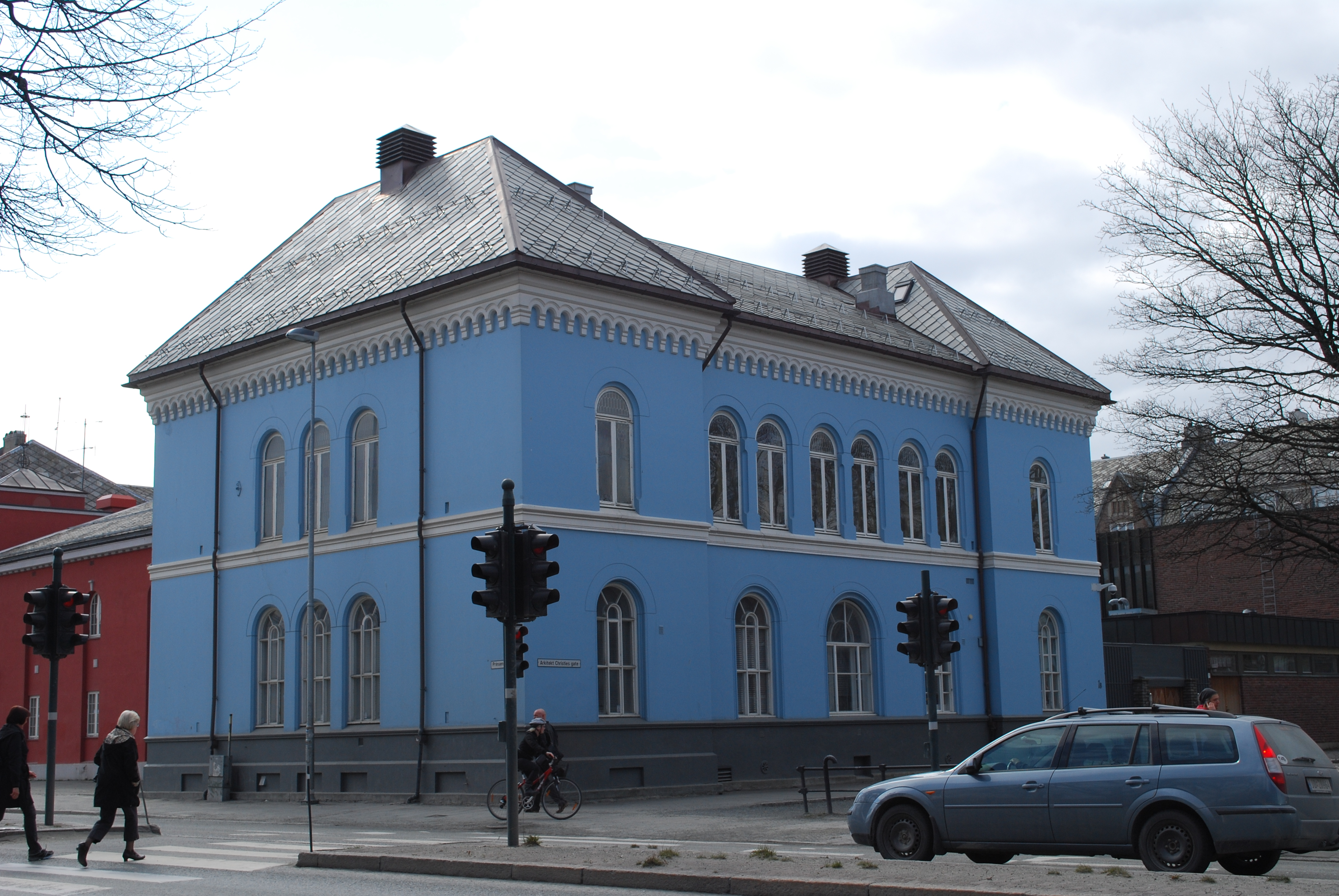
- Front facade, facing Arkitekt Chrities gate. Prinsensgate running left. Photo: Cato Edvardsen (2009)

General information
- Location: Kalvskinnet, Trondheim; Norway
- Owner: The Jewish Community of Trondheim (pr 2015)
- Line: Trondhjem–Støren Line
- Distance: 550.40 km (342.00 mi)
- Platforms: 2

Construction
- Architect: Georg Andreas Bull

History
- Opened: 5 August 1864
- Closed: June 1884
Location

Trondhjem Station (Norwegian: Trondhjem stasjon, original spelling: Throndhjem), sometimes called Kalvskinnet to distinguish it from Trondheim Central Station on Brattøra. Kalvskinnet was the first central railway station in Trondheim, Norway. It opened on 5 August 1864 as the terminal station of the narrow gauge Trondhjem–Støren Line. The station was designed by Georg Andreas Bull, and still exists as one of the world's northernmost synagogues, after it was replaced by Trondheim Central Station in 1884 to become Trondheim Synagogue.

Preceding station		Following station
Sluppen	Trondhjem–Støren Line	Terminus
