= Melhus Station =

Railway station in Melhus, Trøndelag, Norway

Melhus
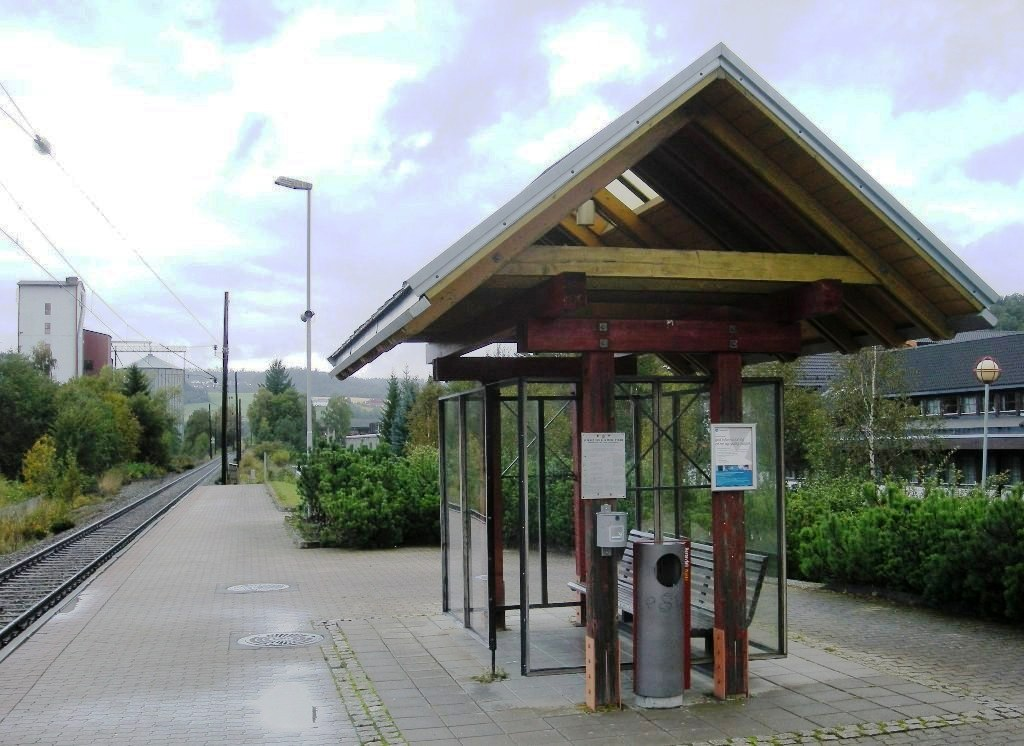
- View of Melhus Station

General information
- Location: Melhus; Melhus Municipality, Trøndelag; Norway
- Coordinates: 63°17′05″N 10°16′32″E
- Elevation: 24.4 m (80 ft)
- System: Railway station
- Owner: Bane NOR
- Operator: SJ Norge
- Line: Dovrebanen
- Distance: 531.428 km (330.214 mi)
- Platforms: 1

History
- Opened: 1993
Location
- Location within Trøndelag Location within Norway

Melhus Station (Norwegian: Melhus stasjon) is a railway station in the village of Melhus in Melhus Municipality in Trøndelag county, Norway. The station is located on the Dovre Line, about 21 kilometres (13 mi) south of Trondheim Central Station (Trondheim S) and about 531 kilometres (330 mi) north of Oslo Central Station (Oslo S). The station sits at an elevation of 24 metres (79 ft) above sea level. It is served by local trains to Røros Station. The station was opened 1993 and is somewhat south of the old station in Melhus.

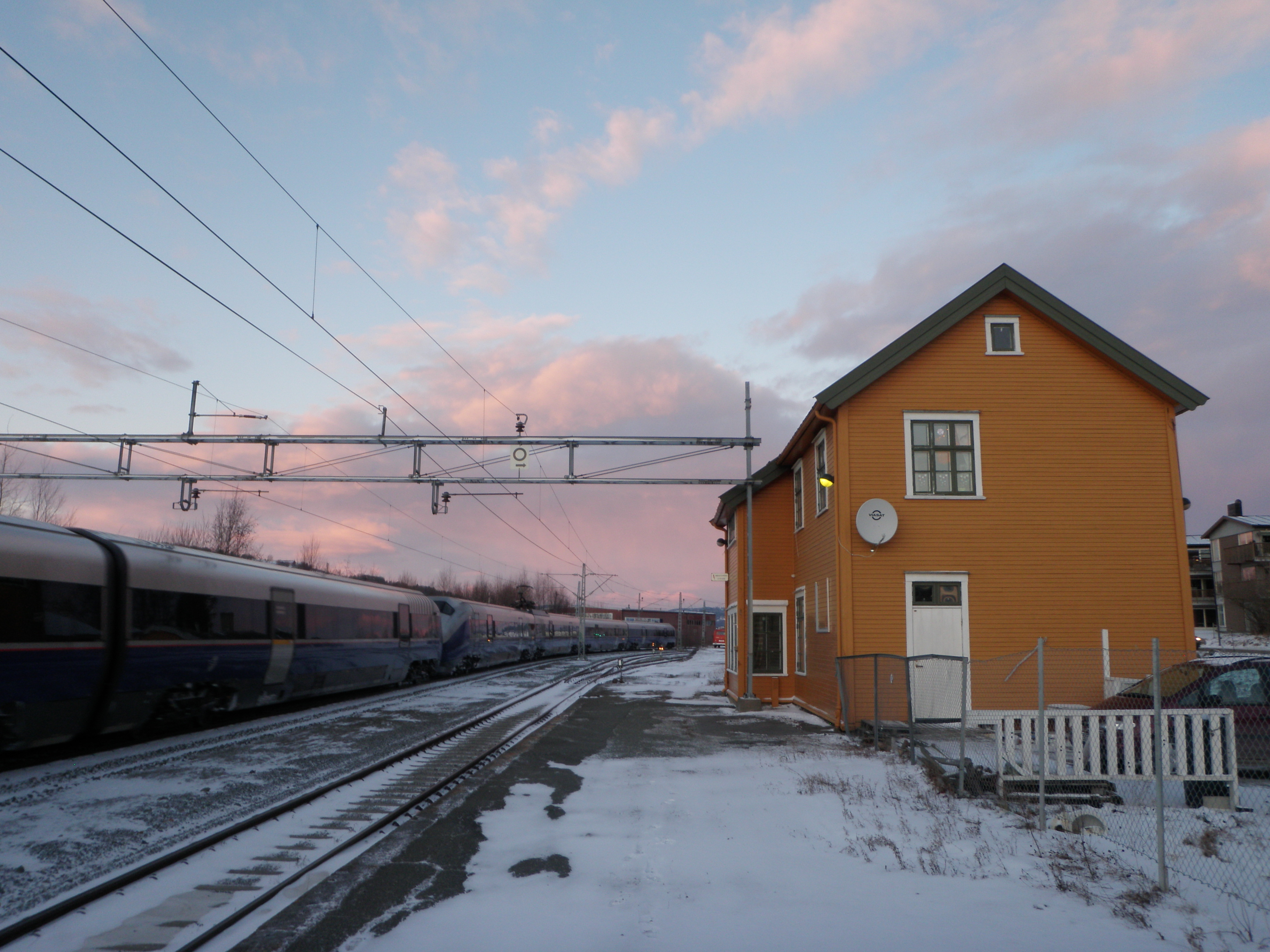
The former, decommissioned, Melhus Station, with a passing NSB Class 73 train

Preceding station			Following station
Kvål	Dovre Line		Heimdal
Preceding station	Regional trains		Following station
Kvål	R60	Røros–Trondheim	Heimdal
