= KVAL =

KVAL may refer to:

- KVAL-TV, a television station (channel 13 analog/25 digital) licensed to Eugene, Oregon, United States
- KISK, a radio station (104.9 FM) licensed to Cal-Nev-Ari, Nevada, United States, which held the call sign KVAL from 2008 to 2015

== See also ==
- Kvål (disambiguation)
