= Gulfoss Tunnel =

Gulfoss Tunnel Gulfosstunnelen
- Interactive map of Gulfoss Tunnel; Gulfosstunnelen

Overview
- Line: Dovrebanen
- Location: Melhus Municipality, Trøndelag, Norway
- Coordinates: 63.1186°N 10.2446°E
- Status: In use
- System: Norwegian railways

Operation
- Opened: 6 July 1918
- Owner: Bane NOR
- Operator: Norwegian Railway Directorate
- Traffic: Rail

Technical
- Line length: 701 m (2,300 ft)
- No. of tracks: Single
- Track gauge: 1,435 mm (4 ft 8 1/2 in)
- Electrified: Yes

Gulfoss Tunnel is a 701-meter (2,300 ft) railway tunnel situated in Melhus Municipality in Trøndelag county, Norway. The tunnel runs beneath the village of Hovin, alongside the river Gaula past the Gulfossen waterfall. The tunnel carries a single, electrified track of the Dovrebanen railway line. The Trondhjem–Støren Line, which opened in 1864, crossed the river Gaula on a bridge to the opposite side of the river at the current site of the tunnel. This section of track was a challenge due to regular flooding. With the 1908 decision to build the Dovrebanen Line and gauge conversion, the Gulfossen section became one of two parts of the line to be reworked. Gulfoss Tunnel opened on 6 July 1918.

== Specifications ==
The Gulfoss Tunnel has a length of 701 meters (2,300 ft) and carries a single track of electrified, standard gauge railway. Situated on the Dovre Line, the southern end is situated 508.97 kilometers (316.26 mi) from Oslo Central Station. Immediately to the north is a 72-meter (236 ft) bridge which crosses Gaula.

== History ==
The Trondhjem–Støren Line opened in 1864. At Gulfossen, the line was carried across the river Gaula on a 188-meter (617 ft) bridge. The Gaula had proved to be a challenge for keeping the railway running due to its fairly regular flooding. The first major flood took place in May 1879, causing landslides along the line at several parts. Following the 1908 decision to extend the Dovre Line to Trondheim, the Norwegian State Railways decided to upgrade two sections of the Trondhjem–Støren Line along with a gauge conversion to standard gauge. In addition to part of the line north of Heimdal, this involved building a new section past Gulfossen.

The break-through of the tunnel took place on 18 June 1915, and was followed by a new and smaller bridge crossing Gaula, which was completed in early 1918. A flood hit the section of track past Gulfossen on 23 June 1918, washing away the line. NSB dispatched 300 workers to the area, including 150 army engineers. They immediately started work on laying tracks through the tunnel, allowing the new segment to be taken into use on 6 July. The tunnel was electrified on 1 November 1970.
