= Hovin, Trøndelag =

Village in Melhus Municipality, Norway

Hovin
- Village
- Interactive map of Hovin
- Location within Trøndelag Location within Norway
- Coordinates: 63.1055°N 10.2238°E
- Country: Norway
- Region: Central Norway
- County: Trøndelag
- District: Gauldalen
- Municipality: Melhus Municipality

Area
  - Total: 0.47 km^{2} (0.18 sq mi)
- Elevation: 69 m (226 ft)

Population (2024)
  - Total: 841
  - Density: 1,789/km^{2} (4,630/sq mi)
- Time zone: UTC+01:00 (CET)
  - Summer (DST): UTC+02:00 (CEST)
- Post Code: 7236 Hovin i Gauldal

Hovin is a village in Melhus Municipality in Trøndelag county, Norway. It is located along the river Gaula between the villages of Støren and Lundamo. Hovin has several distinct terraces in the hillsides, which are remnants of old shorelines following the end of the last ice age.

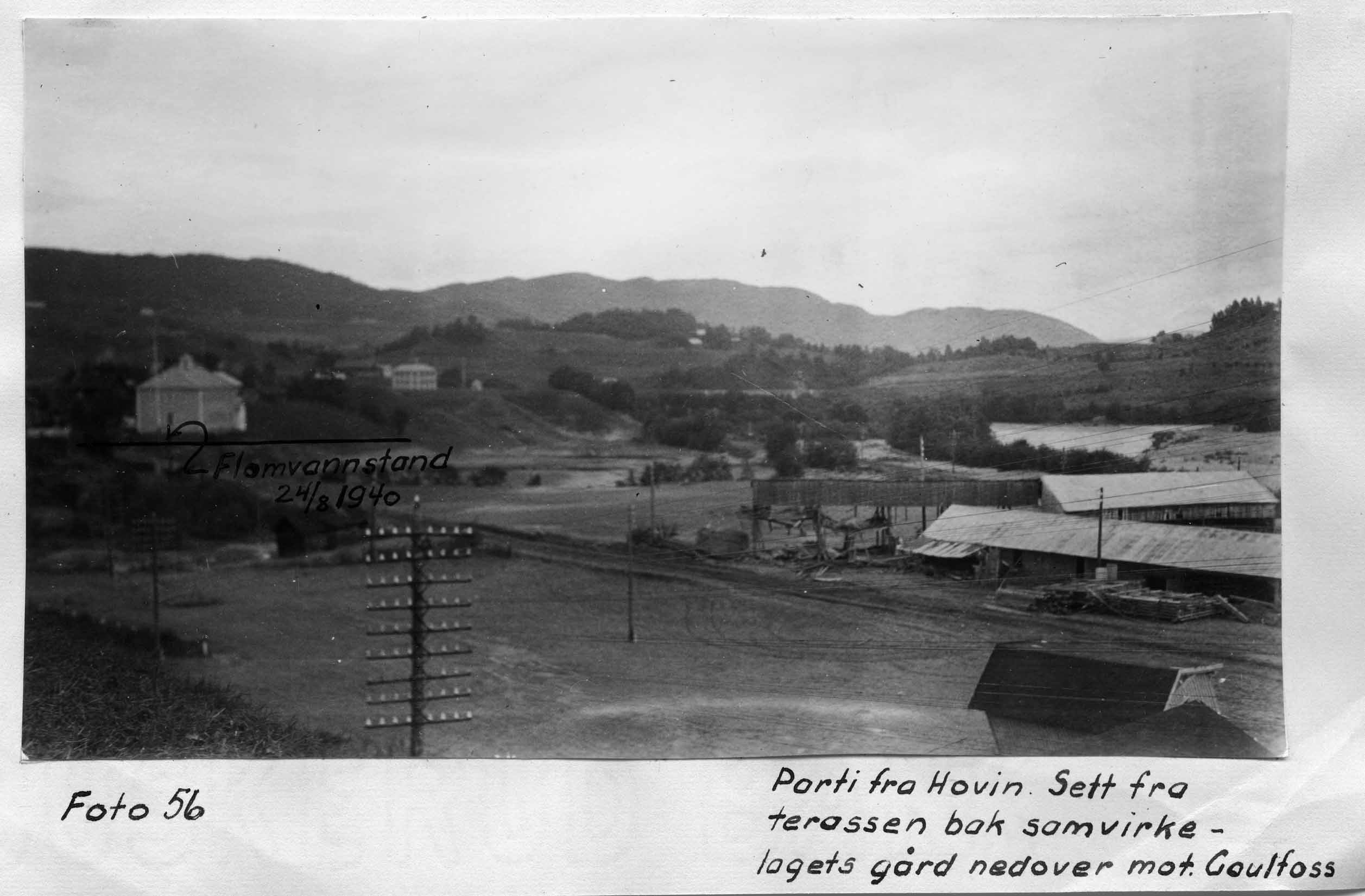
View of Hovin from the 1940s

The 0.47-square-kilometre (120-acre) village has a population (2024) of 841 and a population density of 1,789 inhabitants per square kilometre (4,630/sq mi).

The European route E06 highway runs north–south through the village. The Dovrebanen railway line also runs north–south through Hovin. Hovin Station is located in the village along the railway line, but only used for local traffic. The Gulfoss Tunnel is a railway tunnel that runs under a large residential area in Hovin.
