= Lundamo =

Village in Melhus Municipality, Norway

- Village
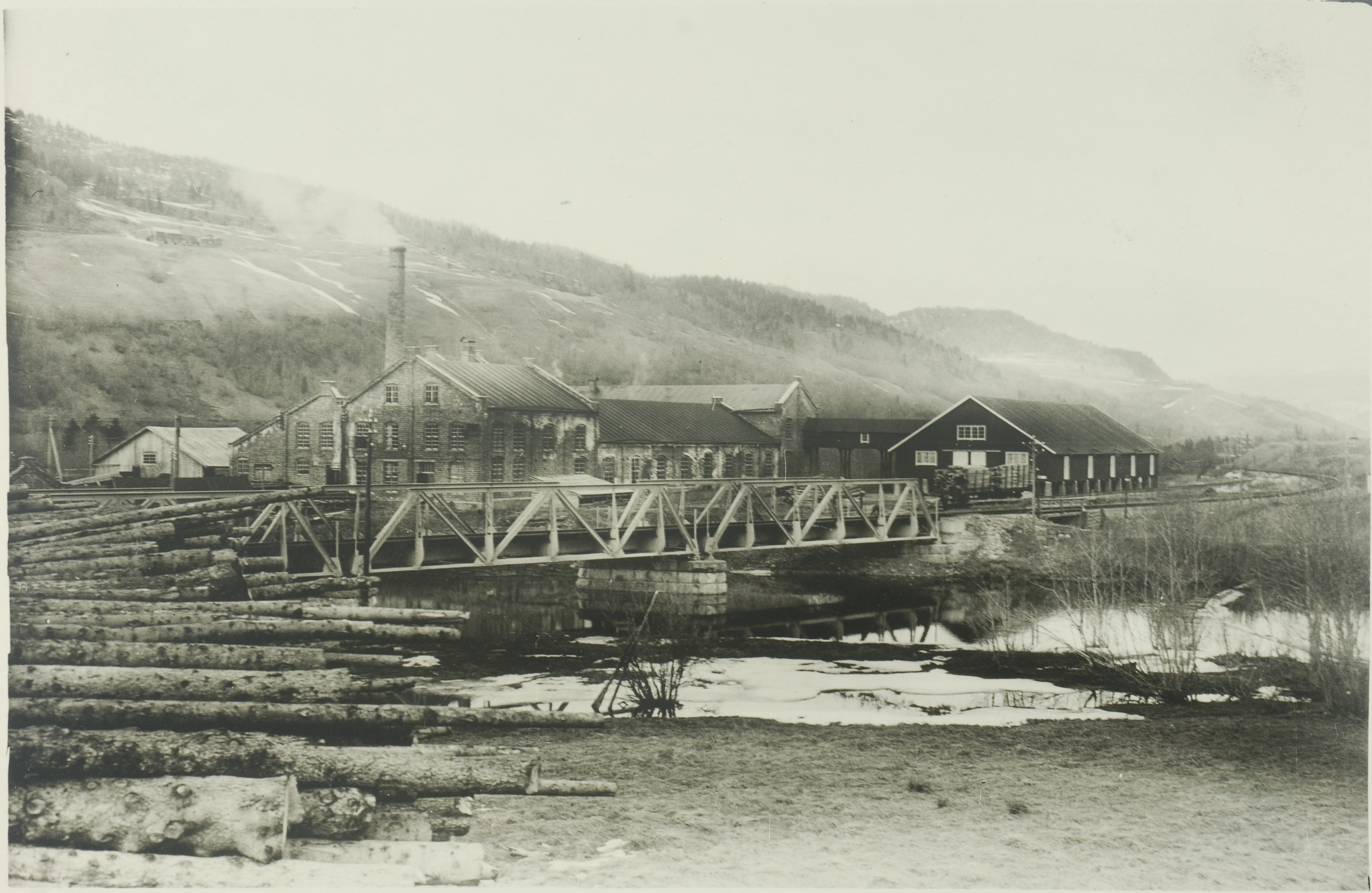
- Interactive map of Lundamo
- Location within Trøndelag Location within Norway
- Coordinates: 63.1522°N 10.2856°E
- Country: Norway
- Region: Central Norway
- County: Trøndelag
- District: Gauldalen
- Municipality: Melhus Municipality

Area
  - Total: 0.88 km^{2} (0.34 sq mi)
- Elevation: 37 m (121 ft)

Population (2024)
  - Total: 1,159
  - Density: 1,317/km^{2} (3,410/sq mi)
- Time zone: UTC+01:00 (CET)
  - Summer (DST): UTC+02:00 (CEST)
- Post Code: 7232 Lundamo

Lundamo is a village in Melhus Municipality in Trøndelag county, Norway. It is located along the Gaula River between the villages of Hovin and Ler.

The 0.88-square-kilometre (220-acre) village has a population (2024) of 1,159 and a population density of 1,317 inhabitants per square kilometre (3,410/sq mi).

Lundamo Station is located in the village along the Dovre Line, but it is now in use only for local traffic. The European route E6 highway also runs through the village. The Gaula River runs through Lundamo and in 2005 it was selected the best river for salmon-fishing in Norway.

== History ==
Lundamo was the administrative center of the old Horg Municipality. It is also the location of the historic Horg Church.
