= Marienborg Station =

Railway station in Trondheim, Norway

Marienborg
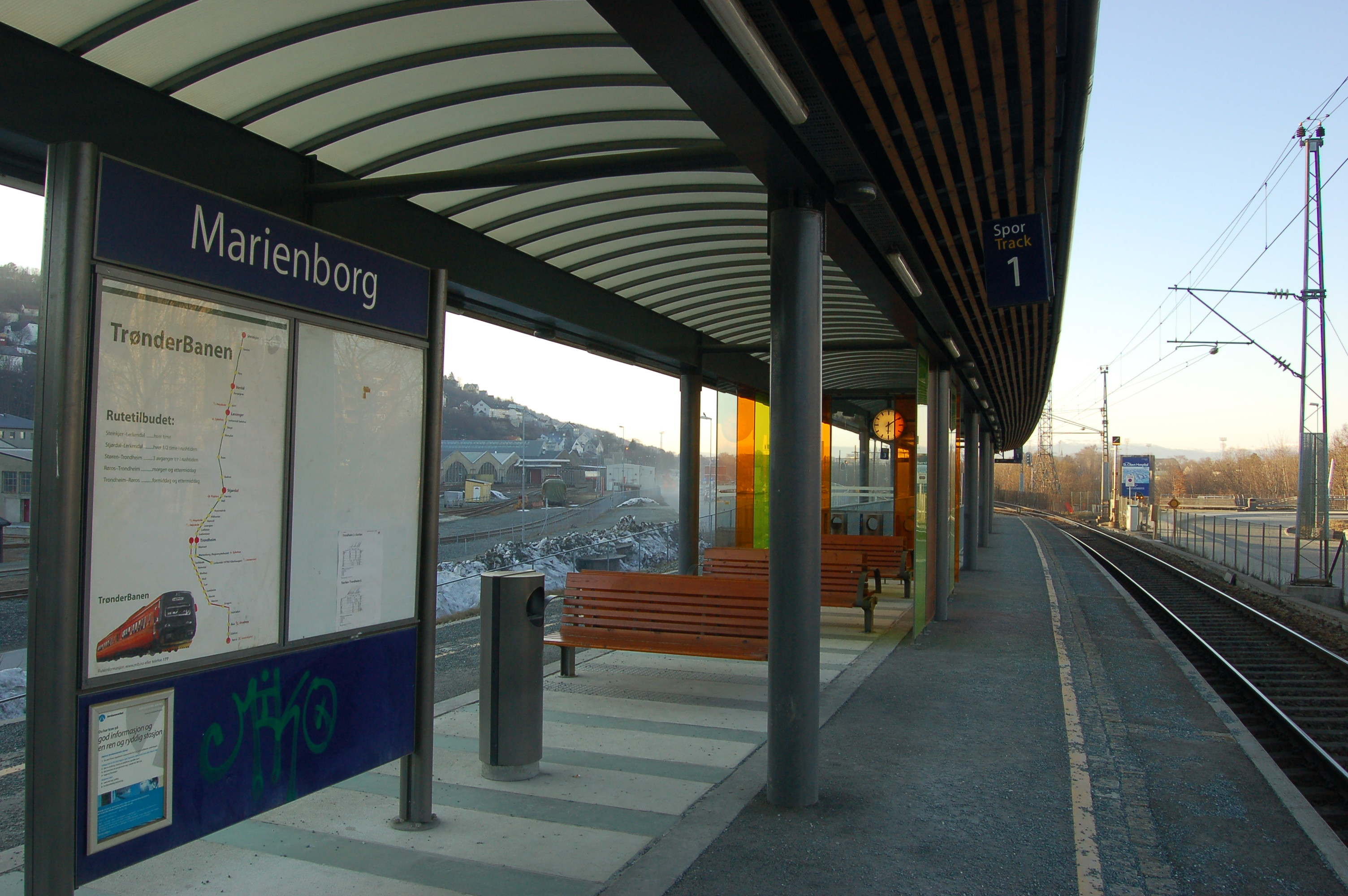

General information
- Location: Marienborg, Trondheim; Norway
- Coordinates: 63°25′12″N 10°22′55″E
- Owner: Bane NOR
- Operator: SJ Norge
- Line: Dovre Line
- Distance: 549,95 km
- Platforms: 2
- Connections: Bus: 19 Sandmoen - Pirterminalen

History
- Opened: 1999
Location

Marienborg is a railway station located at Marienborg in Trondheim, Norway.

== Location ==
The station is located on the Dovre Line at the point where the Stavne–Leangen Line branches off from the Dovre Line. The station has two platforms, one on each of the railway lines, the one track electrified and the other not. Service to the station is provided though the commuter train service Trønderbanen operated by SJ Norge and regional trains to Røros. It was opened in 1999.

The station is located beside St. Olavs Hospital and beside the NSB yard at Marienborg. The station had a role in the 1921 Nidareid train disaster since one of the trains involved was supposed to wait here but failed to do so.

Preceding station			Following station
Selsbakk	Dovre Line		Skansen
terminus	Stavne–Leangen Line		Lerkendal
Preceding station	Regional trains		Following station
Selsbakk	R60	Røros–Trondheim	Skansen
Preceding station	Local trains		Following station
Lerkendal		Trønderbanen	Skansen
