= Kvål, Trøndelag =

Village in Melhus Municipality, Norway

Kvål
- Village
- Interactive map of Kvål
- Location within Trøndelag Location within Norway
- Coordinates: 63.2314°N 10.2818°E
- Country: Norway
- Region: Central Norway
- County: Trøndelag
- District: Gauldalen
- Municipality: Melhus Municipality

Area
  - Total: 0.45 km^{2} (0.17 sq mi)
- Elevation: 49 m (161 ft)

Population (2024)
  - Total: 468
  - Density: 1,040/km^{2} (2,700/sq mi)
- Time zone: UTC+01:00 (CET)
  - Summer (DST): UTC+02:00 (CEST)
- Post Code: 7228 Kvål

Kvål is a village in Melhus Municipality in Trøndelag county, Norway. It is located in the Gauldalen valley along the Gaula River between the villages of Ler and Melhus.

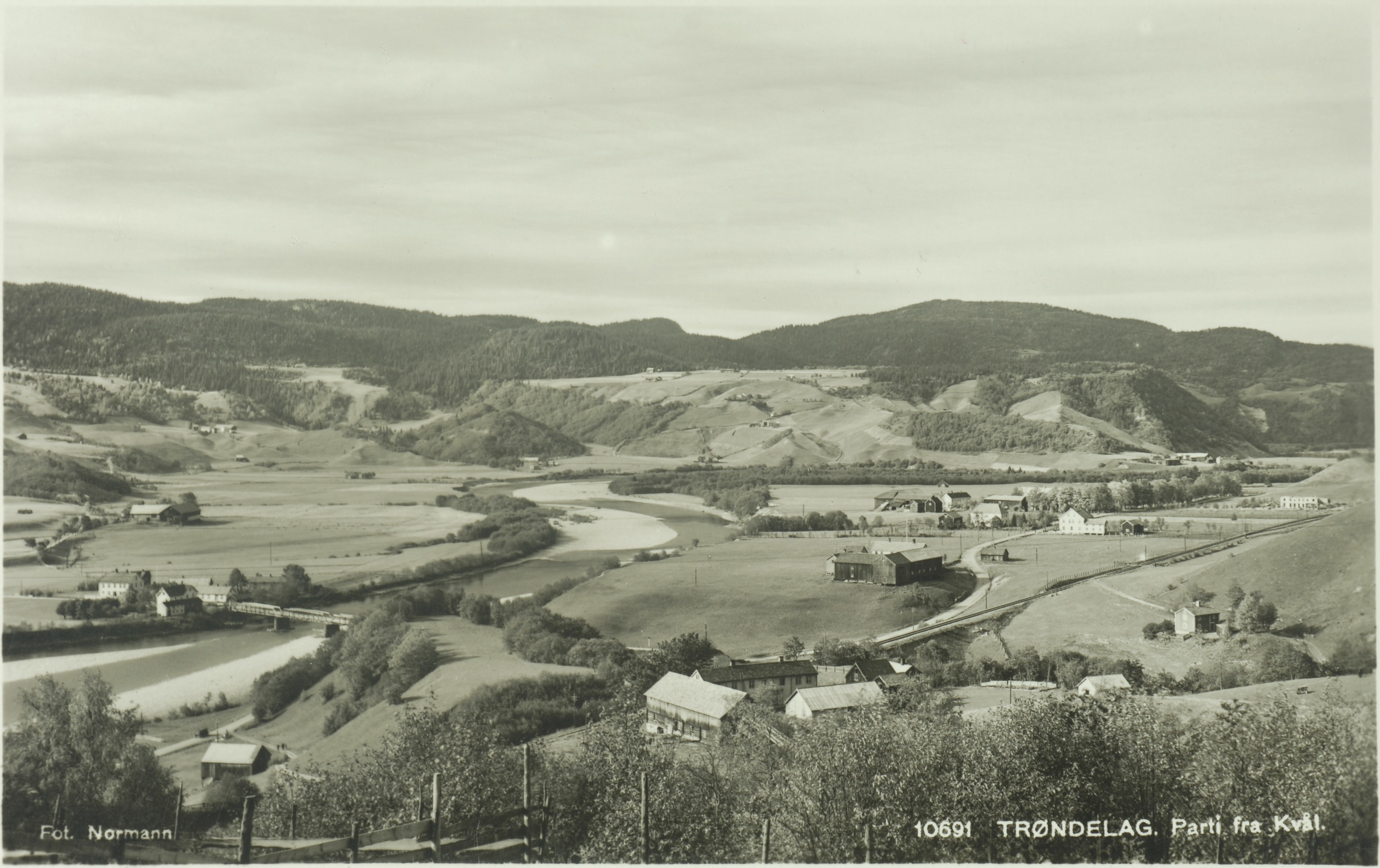
View of Kvål (c. 1920s)

The 0.45-square-kilometre (110-acre) village has a population (2024) of 468 and a population density of 1,040 inhabitants per square kilometre (2,700/sq mi).

Kvål Station is located in the village along the Dovre Line, but it is only used for local traffic. The European route E6 highway also runs through the village.

== Sports ==
The local multi-sports club is Trønder-Lyn Idrettslag, founded on 22 March 1908. The club has sections for association football, team handball and Nordic skiing, and also operates a discgolf park. The club colours are yellow and black. For their 100th anniversary in 2008, a book was written by Gerd Søraa.

The men's football team currently plays in the Fourth Division, the fifth tier of Norwegian football. After winning their Fourth Division group in 2022, Trønder-Lyn contested the 2023 Norwegian Third Division, but was relegated after their first year.
