= Selsbakk =

Neighborhood in the city of Trondheim, Norway

- Neighborhood in Trondheim
- Interactive map of Selsbakk
- Coordinates: 63.3898°N 10.3650°E
- Country: Norway
- Region: Central Norway
- County: Trøndelag
- Municipality: Trondheim Municipality
- Borough: Midtbyen
- Elevation: 66 m (217 ft)
- Time zone: UTC+01:00 (CET)
  - Summer (DST): UTC+02:00 (CEST)

Selsbakk is a neighbourhood in the city of Trondheim in Trøndelag county, Norway. It is located in the borough of Midtbyen in Trondheim Municipality. It is approximately 5 kilometres (3 mi) south of the city centre. The local sports club is Selsbakk IF.
