= Brattøra =

Island in Trøndelag, Norway

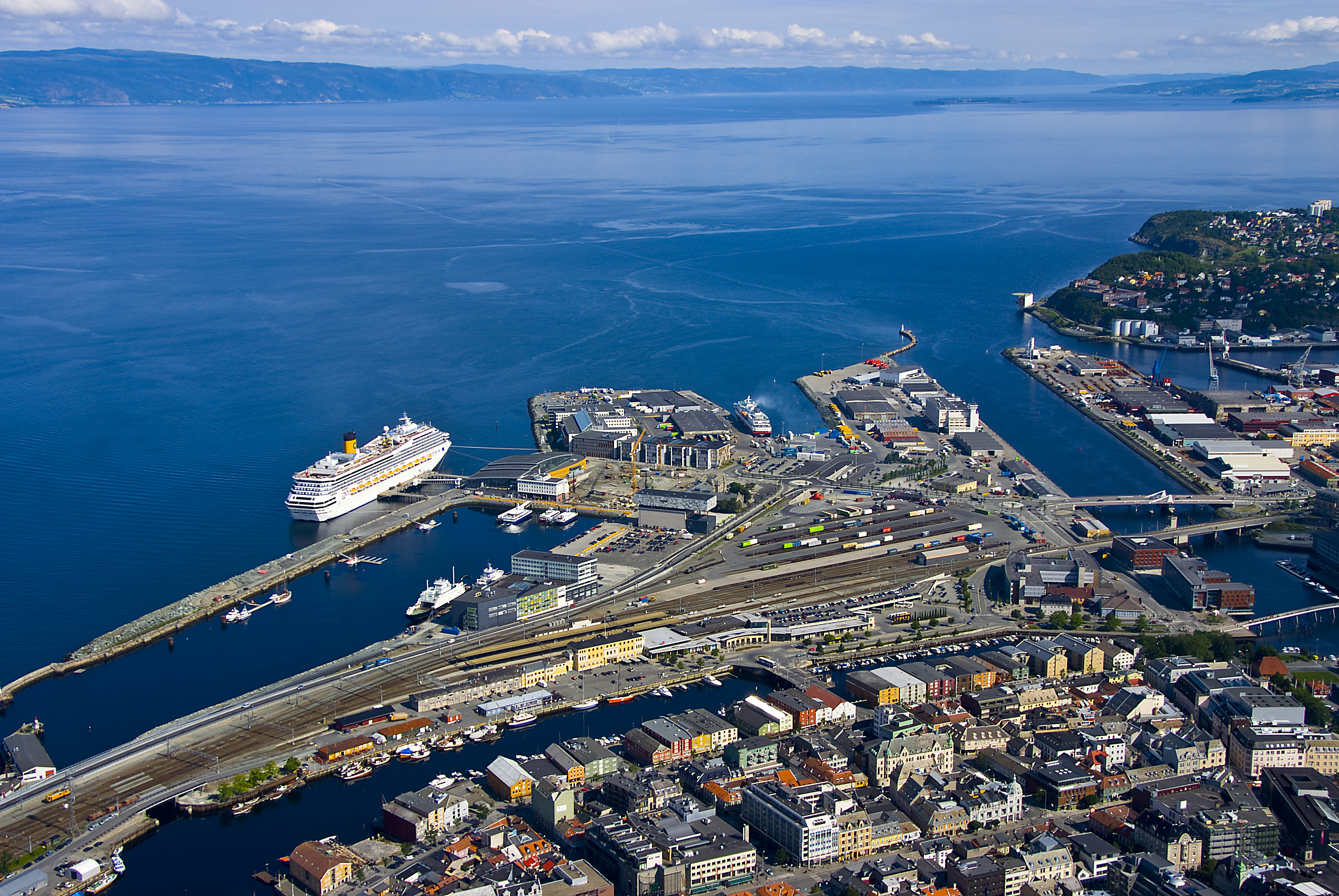
- Interactive map of Brattøra

Geography
- Location: Trøndelag, Norway
- Coordinates: 63.4387°N 10.4025°E
- Area: 0.485 km^{2} (0.187 sq mi)
- Length: 1.5 km (0.93 mi)
- Width: 0.5 km (0.31 mi)
- Coastline: 5.3 km (3.29 mi)
- Highest elevation: 3 m (10 ft)

Administration
- Norway
- County: Trøndelag
- Municipality: Trondheim Municipality

Brattøra is an artificial island and industrial area in the city of Trondheim which is located in Trondheim Municipality in Trøndelag county, Norway. The 0.485-square-kilometre (120-acre) island is located at the mouth of the river Nidelva just north of the city centre (Midtbyen), west of Nyhavna, and south of Trondheimsfjord. There is a canal that divides the mainland from what is now the island of Brattøra. In addition to some commercial offices, most of the island is used by Trondheim Central Station and Trondheim Port.

The island is connected to the western parts of Trondheim by the Skansen Tunnel which was completed in 2010.

Since the late 1990s, there has been an urban renewal program at Brattøra, converting parts of the port to office buildings, including the swimming pool "Pirbadet" and a massive office complex housing among others Reinertsen and the Norwegian School of Management. Brattøra also houses Pirterminalen, the docks for the high-speed catamaran services to Fosen and Kristiansund as well as the corporate headquarters of Fosen Trafikklag. The Coastal Express and other cruise ships also stop at Brattøra.

Brattøra was the site of the Øreting, the regional Ting during the Middle Ages.
