= Trondhjem–Støren Line =

Railway line in Norway

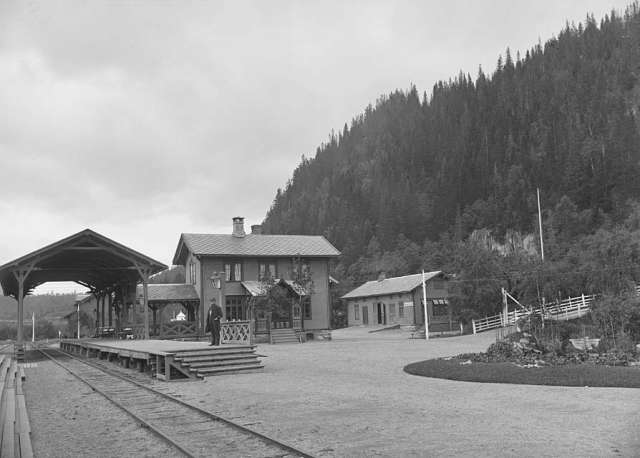
- Støren Station, the southern terminus, in 1880-90.

Overview
- Native name: Trondhjem-Størenbanen
- Status: Merged with the Dovre Line
- Owner: Norwegian State Railways
- Termini: Trondhjem Kalvskinnet Station; Støren

Service
- Type: Railway
- System: Norwegian railway
- Operator: Norwegian State Railways

History
- Opened: 1864

Technical
- Line length: 51.1 km
- Number of tracks: Single
- Character: Passenger and freight
- Track gauge: 1,067 mm (3 ft 6 in)
- Electrification: No

The Trondhjem–Støren Line (Norwegian: Trondhjem–Størenbanen) was Trøndelag's first railway. It opened on 5 August 1864, ten years after the Trunk Line between Oslo and Eidsvoll Municipality opened. The 49 kilometer long (later 51.1 km) railway line was narrow gauged (1,067 mm (3 ft 6 in)) and went between the city of Trondheim and the village of Støren (in what is now Midtre Gauldal Municipality in Trøndelag county, Norway).

The railway had its station, Trondhjem Kalvskinnet Station, in Prinsens gate, crossed the Nidelva river on a newly constructed railroad bridge to Elgeseter, the Elgeseter Bridge.

In 1877 the line was joined with the Røros Line, which went through the Østerdalen between Røros and Hamar. In 1884 the railway tracks were relocated to the west side of the Nidelva and joined with the Meråker Line and the new railway station at Brattøra, which had opened in 1882. This went through a tunnel at Nidareid to Brattøra. In 1918 new tracks were laid to Heimdal over Selsbakk.

== Gauge conversion ==
In 1921 the railway was converted to standard gauge and became a part of the Dovre Line.

== See also ==
- Rail transport in Norway
- List of gauge conversions
- Narrow gauge railways in Norway

== Bibliography ==
- Owen, Roy (1996). Norwegian railways : from Stephenson to high speed. Hitchin: Balholm Press. ISBN 0-9528069-0-8. OCLC 43127416.
