= Trondheim Central Station =

Railway station in Trondheim, Norway

Trondheim S
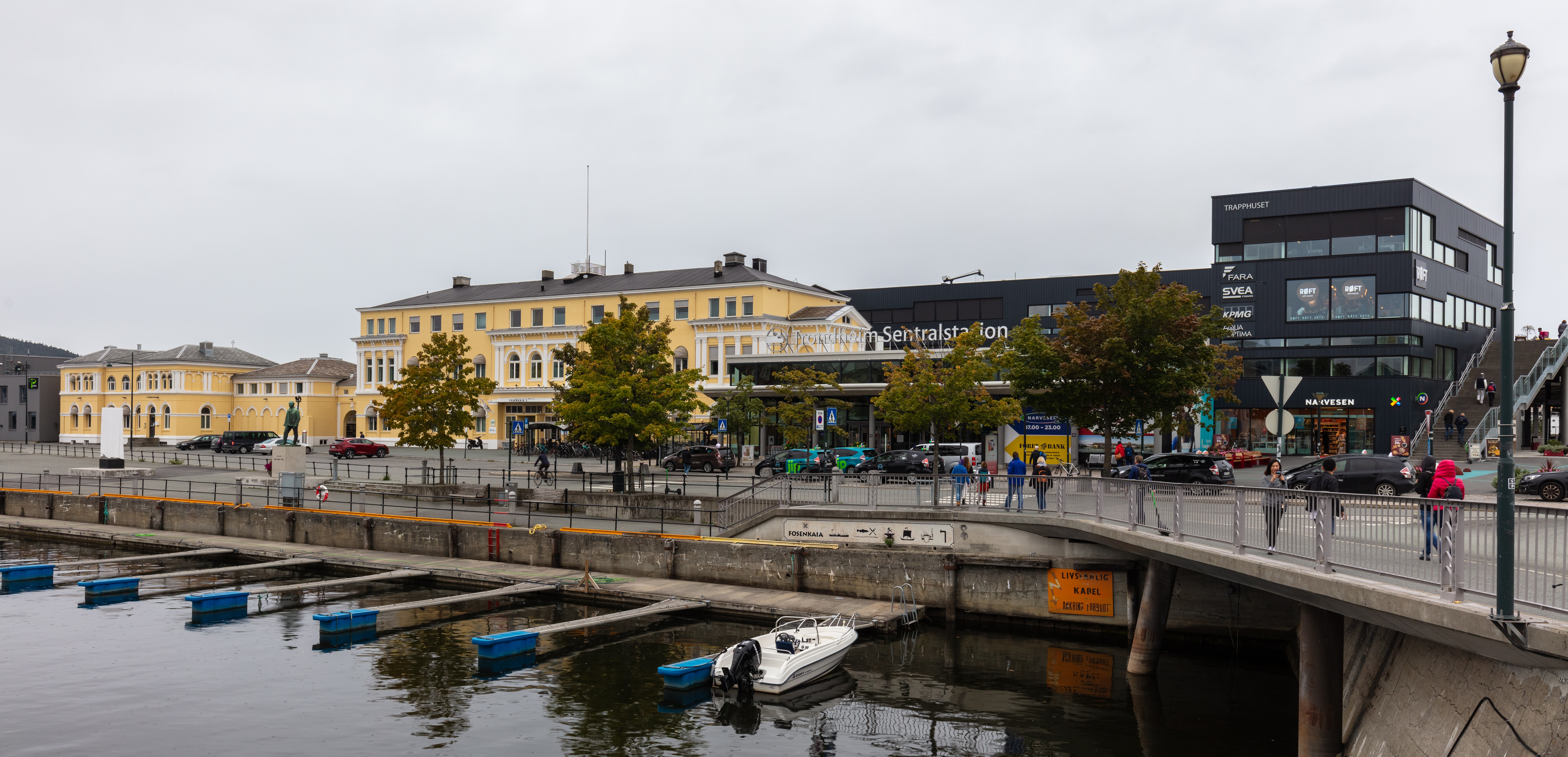
- Trondheim Central Station

General information
- Location: Brattøra, Trondheim; Norway
- Coordinates: 63°26′11″N 10°23′56″E
- Elevation: 5.1 m (17 ft)
- Owner: Bane NOR
- Operator: SJ Norge
- Lines: Dovre Line; Nordland Line
- Distance: 552.87 km (343.54 mi)
- Platforms: 5
- Connections: Bus: AtB; Vy express

Construction
- Architect: Balthazar Lange

Other information
- Station code: TND
- IATA code: XZT

History
- Opened: 8 May 1882
Location

Trondheim Central Station (Norwegian: Trondheim sentralstasjon) or Trondheim S is the main railway station serving the city of Trondheim, Norway. Located at Brattøra in the north part of the city centre, it is the terminus of the Dovre Line, running southwards, and the Nordland Line, which runs north.

SJ Norge serves the station with express trains to Oslo and Bodø, regional trains to Røros and Östersund in Sweden, and the Trøndelag Commuter Rail. The Trondheim Bus Station located at the station serves all long-distance buses, and some city buses. From 1913 to 1968 the station was also the terminus for two lines of the Trondheim Tramway.

Trondheim's first station, dating from 1864, was located at Kalvskinnet. In 1877 the current station was built to serve the Meråker Line to Sweden—since integrated into the Nordland Line. At the same time a connection was built between the two stations, and the central station took over as the main station serving Trondheim. In 1910 construction of a new station for the Dovre Line was started, finishing in 1921. The main station building consists of an older section in historicism brick, while the annex is in postmodernistic concrete and glass.

== Services ==
Train services are provided by SJ Norge both north- and southbound. Four services a day and one night train operate to Oslo Central Station, while there is one day and one night train to Bodø, with an additional afternoon departure to Mo i Rana. Two daily departures serve Sweden and Storlien, in addition there are three services to Røros, with connections onwards to Østerdalen. The most frequent service is the hourly Trøndelag Commuter Rail from Steinkjer via Trondheim Airport, Værnes and Trondheim S to Lerkendal, with some extending to Oppdal.

The station is staffed, but also equipped with ticket machines. There are several kiosks and cafés, as well as a car park, taxicabs, bicycle stands and baggage lockers. The station and platforms are wheelchair accessible, and a pre-booked escort service is available. Trafikanten Midt-Norge, which sells bus tickets and provides information on public transport routes in Trøndelag, can be found in the new section. The station is closed at night.

The commuter trains serve other railway stations in neighborhoods in Trondheim; Heimdal, Selsbakk, Marienborg, Skansen to the south, and Lademoen/Nedre Elvehavn, Lilleby, Leangen and Rotvoll to the east.

=== Connections to other modes of transport ===
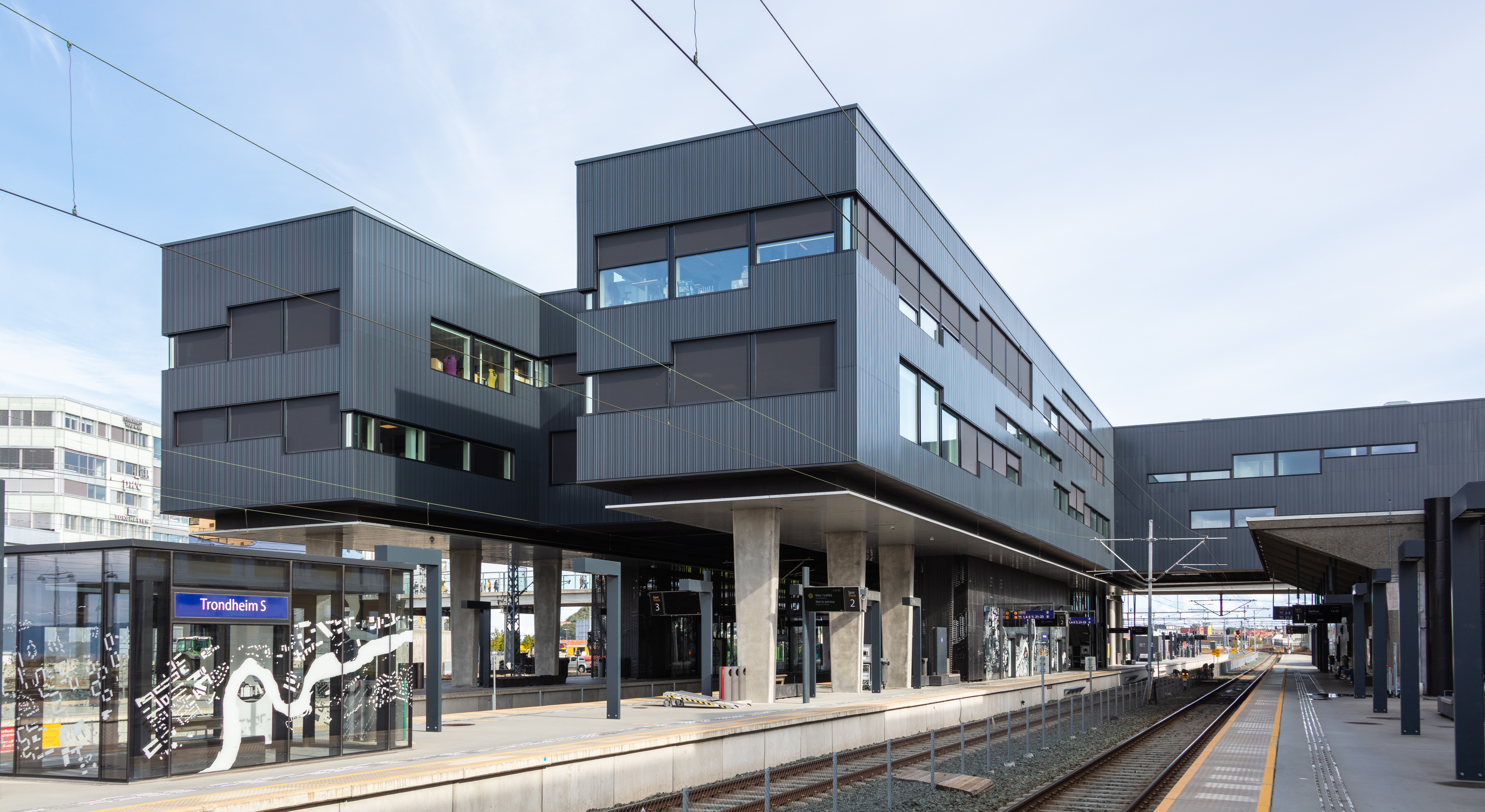
The tracks and platforms

==== Buses ====
In 1995, the city bus station was moved from Lüthenhaven close to the city's main square to the central station, with the opening of a new section to the station. The original building has been preserved by the Norwegian Directorate for Cultural Heritage as a cultural heritage.

Some city buses operated by Team Trafikk stop at the station; routes 2, 11, 19, 46, 47, 52, 54, 55, 63, 71, 73, 75, 76, 94. Munkegata Terminal remains the most important, with all buses stopping there. NOR-WAY Bussekspress operates coaches to Oslo via Røros, Namsos and Bergen via Førde. while Lavprisekspressen operates day and night expresses to Oslo. Gauldal Billag operates coaches to Støren, Oppdal, and Røros, while TrønderBilene operates to Fosen, Orkanger, Agdenes, and Orkdal. Nettbuss operates coaches to Malvik, Stjørdal, Meråker, Selbu, Tydal, Skaun, Melhus, Orkland and Meldal, while Klæburuten operates buses to Klæbu and to the airport.

==== Ferries ====
Trondheim S is located about ten minutes walk, or a two-minute bus ride, from Pirterminalen where Fosen Trafikklag operates passenger ferries across the fjord to Vanvikan, and out of the fjord to Brekstad, Sistranda and Kristiansund.

==== Trams ====
Between 1913 and 1968 the station was the terminus for the Trondheim Tramway on the Elgeseter Line (no. 2) and Singsaker Line (no. 3). In 2005 plans to extend the only current line, the Gråkallen Line, from the St. Olavs gate via Trondheim S to Pirterminalen were launched.

== History ==
=== Two stations ===
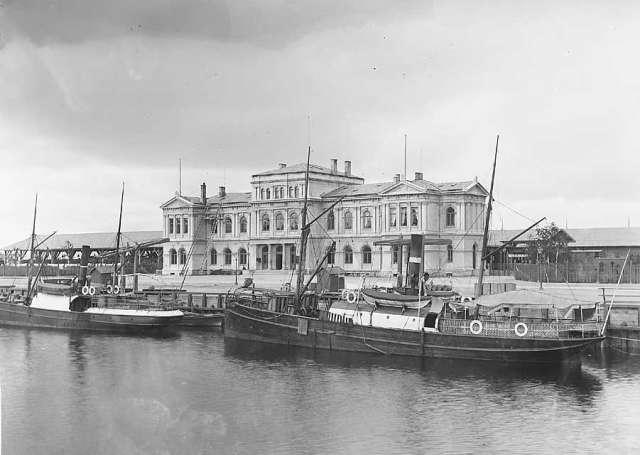
The station during the 1880s, just after it opened

The first railway station to be built in Trondheim was located at Kalvskinnet, to serve the narrow gauge Trondhjem–Støren Line railway that was completed in 1864. The station was designed by Georg Andreas Bull, and still exists as a synagogue. In 1877 the state and city made an agreement to build a new station at Brattøra to serve the new Meråker Line that was being built to Sweden. Brattøra was chosen because it was located directly beside the port, and would allow direct transshipment from ships to the railway of both goods and passengers. The station would become the main station for both railways; this caused a major protest among the local population, who felt it was necessary to have two terminal stations, one for each line, and the city brought the matter before the courts—the case was settled in 1895 in favor of one station. The lack of planning and coordination between the two lines made the new station a large budget cost for the Meråker Line; and described as one of few exceptions to the small-and-cheap policy dominating the state railways i Norway at the time.

Two lots were sold to the state railways from the city, allowing the building of two station buildings, the eastern cargo building for the Meråker Line and the western for Røros Line. The main station in the east served all passenger trains, and was designed by the architect Balthazar Lange. A new route for Røros Line was built from Sluppen to Skansen, along the west side of Nidelva, and the old station taken into disuse after the Røros Line reached the central station on 24 June 1884. To solve the challenge of the break-of-gauge, the entire station area had dual gauge with both 1,435 mm (4 ft 8 1/2 in) and 1,067 mm (3 ft 6 in).

The station at Brattøra has had four names, following the name changes of the city. It was opened as Throndhjem, changed in 1894 to Trondhjem, on 1 January 1930 to Nidaros and to Trondheim on 6 March 1931. The station at Brattøra is physically divided in two parts by the bridge over Ravnkloa. From 1884, the western part was officially called Throndhjem V and the eastern part Throndhjem Ø. The freight station for the Røros Line was located at Throndhjem V, while the passenger station for both lines was located at Throndhjem Ø, just like today. While there were two stations in 1882–84, they were 'probably' referred to as Brattøra and Kalvskinnet.

On 23 April 1888 a landslide hit the station, with 180 metres (590 ft) of track—three wide and including the main Rørosbanen line—was washed into the sea. The slide was caused by the seabed sinking about seven meters, and it was followed by several smaller slides.

=== The Dovre Line arrives ===
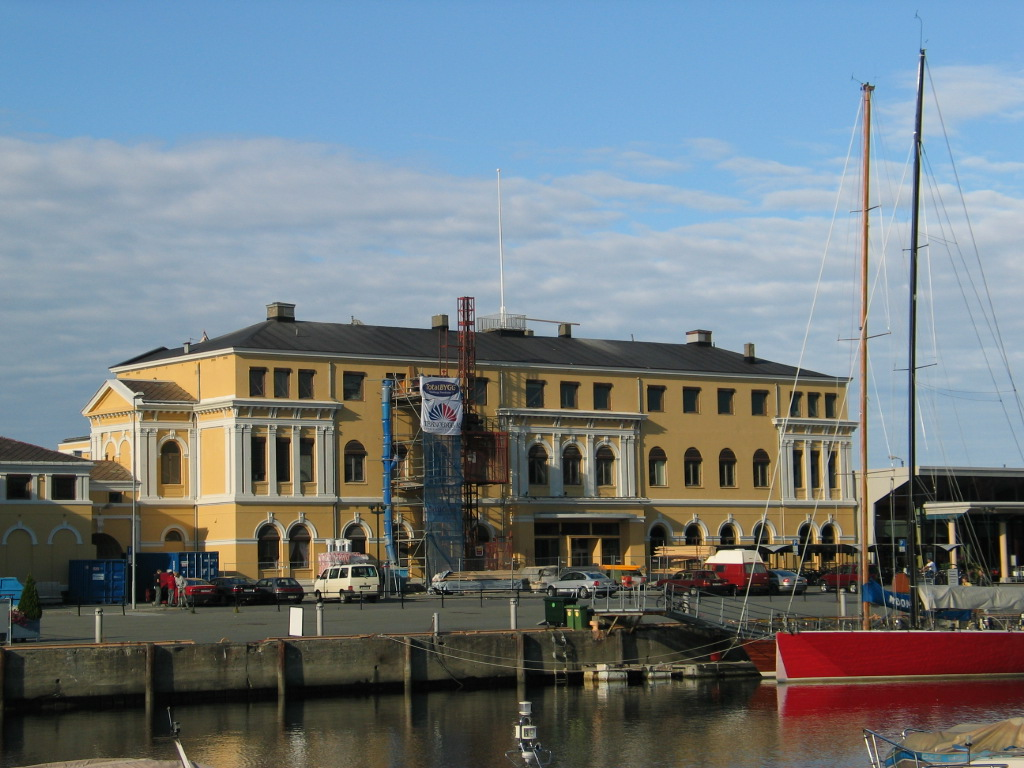
Modern view of the old section

In 1910, the Parliament of Norway announced a competition for the redesign of the station since it had been decided that the Dovre Line would be built to Trondheim, including the line from Støren to Trondheim being converted to standard gauge. On 18 August 1913 construction of a new station and port was started. Traffic had increased to the limits of capacity; there were too few tracks and too small cargo buildings. By 1912 some freight cars were stopping at Hommelvik and Storlien; a counting showed 900 cars at the station. The construction removed a gap filled by the canal between the two stations—filling up the canal in the process. Instead the 92 metres (302 ft) Skansen Bridge was built on the west side of the station, along with a double track to Marienborg where the new depot would be located. The main station building designed by Lange remained the passenger and administration building, with the conversion of the smaller, western one into cargo facilities.

The amount of trackage for cargo was increased, with a wide section of land mass being filled into the sea to create a larger rail and port facility at Brattøra, though the filling of a large part of the seabed to create artificial land. The railways allowed the transshipment of cargo from ships from Northern Norway to rail, as well as from rail from Central Sweden to ships to the British Isles. The port was supplemented by a new line to Ilsvika would allow the loading of ore there. The suggestion to build double track to Leangen was dropped.

While the original plans for the Dovre Line involved completion in 1916, it was not until 1921 the first train could travel from Oslo to Trondheim via Dovre, mostly due to the First World War. The new depot opened in 1916, and in 1917 the double track and dual gauge to Marienborg as well as the new freight terminal was finished. Instead of using one track for each direction on the double track, the Dovre Line would use the one line while the other would be used for transport from the station to the depot. Skansen Bridge opened on 22 March 1918. In 1922, Norsk Spisevognselskap established a kiosk, and on 1 October 1925, they took over the station restaurant.

The main building designed by Lange is in historicism and was originally built in two stories in brick. A third was added in the 1950s, some with some of the original feel being lost in the addition, since it was not stylistically true. In 1965 two annexes were built, one on each side and in two stories. The western was used for offices and the other as part of the waiting area—these were both in line with the historicist style. They replaced a cargo expedition and a restaurant building, respectively. In 1995 the bus station was moved from the city center at Leüthenhaven to the central station, and the eastern annex was razed in favor of a postmodernistic glass and concrete building. In addition to the bus station it features and extension of the waiting area, offices, a restaurant and a parking lot.

Preceding station	Express trains		Following station
Heimdal towards Oslo S		F6	Terminus
Terminus		F7	Trondheim Airport towards Bodø
Preceding station	Regional trains		Following station
Skansen	R60	Røros–Trondheim	—
Terminus		R71	Vikhammer towards Storlien
Preceding station	Local trains		Following station
Skansen		Trøndelag Commuter Rail	Lademoen
