= Røros Station =

Railway station in Røros, Norway

Røros
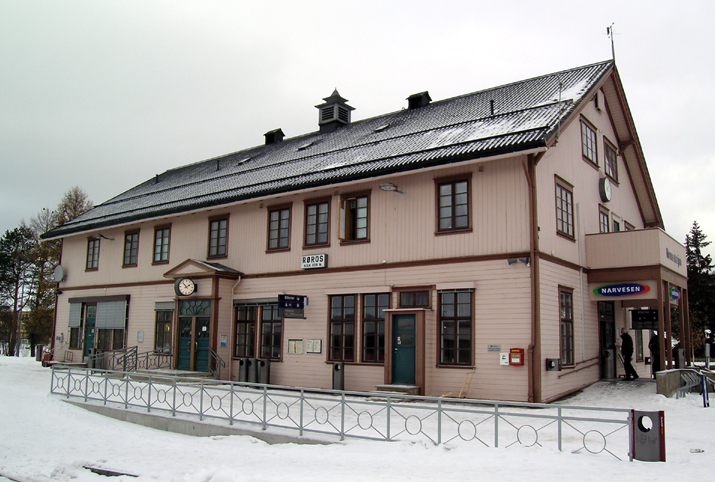
- View of the station

General information
- Location: Norway
- Coordinates: 62.574°N 11.3791°E
- Elevation: 628.0 m (2,060.4 ft)
- System: Railway station
- Owner: Bane NOR
- Operator: Bane NOR
- Line: Rørosbanen
- Distance: 399.05 km (247.96 mi)
- Platforms: 1

History
- Opened: 1877
Location
- Location within Trøndelag Location within Norway

Røros Station (Norwegian: Røros stasjon) is a railway station located in the town of Røros in Røros Municipality in Trøndelag county, Norway. It is located along the Rørosbanen railway line. It is located about 399 kilometres (248 mi) from Oslo Central Station and it sits about 628 metres (2,060 ft) above mean sea level. Service to the station is provided though regional trains operated by SJ Norge to Trondheim Station and Hamar Station. The station was opened in 1877, the same time that the Røros Line opened. The station restaurant was taken over by Norsk Spisevognselskap on 1 December 1944.

Preceding station			Following station
Os	Røros Line		Ålen
Preceding station	Regional trains		Following station
Terminus	R60	Hamar–Røros	Ålen
Preceding station	Regional trains		Following station
Os	R60	Røros–Trondheim	Terminus
