= Åsta =

Village in Åmot Municipality, Norway

- Village
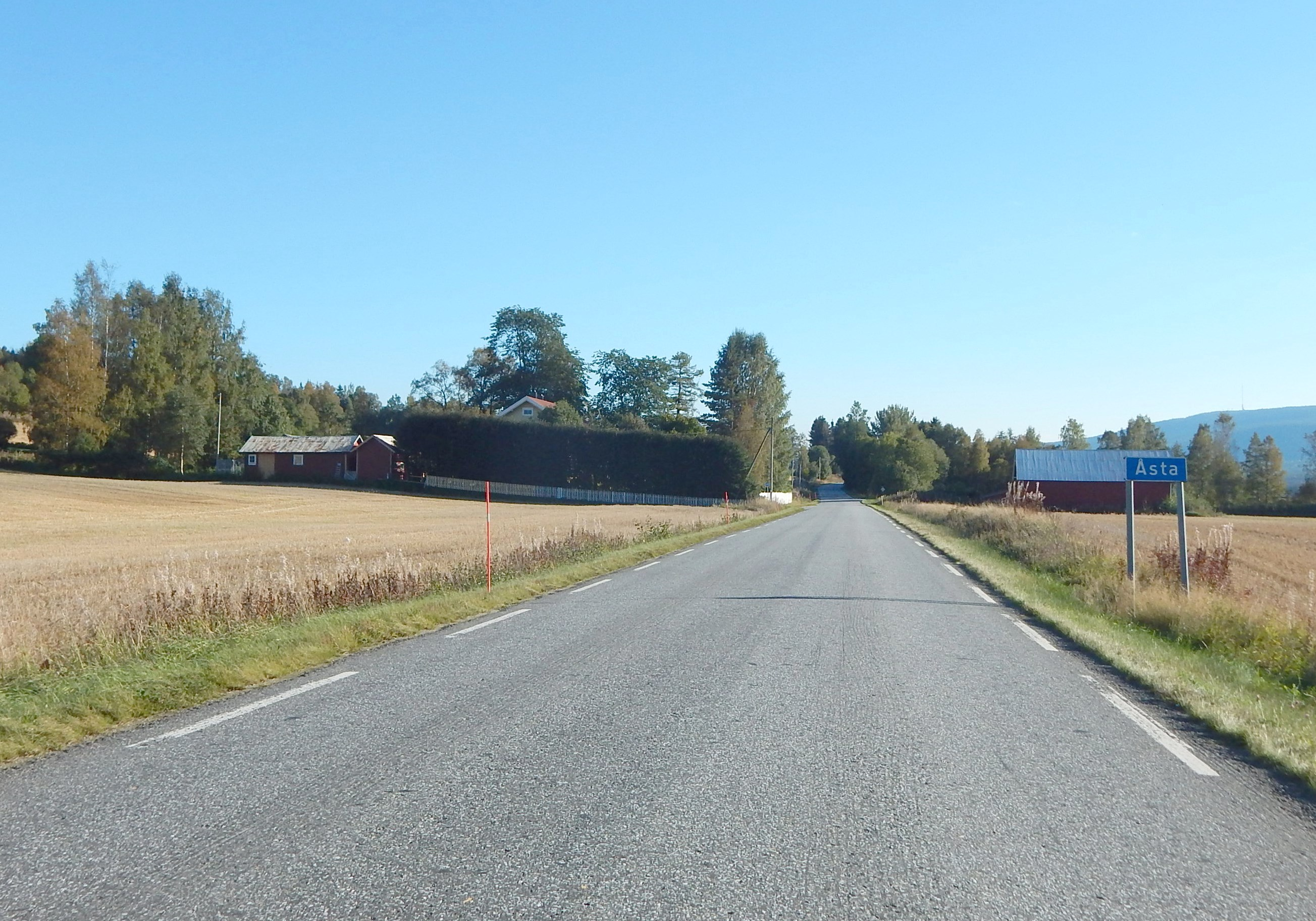
- View of the road leading into Åsta
- Interactive map of Åsta
- Location within Innlandet Location within Norway
- Coordinates: 61.07431°N 11.34843°E
- Country: Norway
- Region: Eastern Norway
- County: Innlandet
- District: Østerdalen
- Municipality: Åmot Municipality
- Elevation: 236 m (774 ft)
- Time zone: UTC+01:00 (CET)
  - Summer (DST): UTC+02:00 (CEST)
- Post Code: 2450 Rena

Åsta is a village in Åmot Municipality in Innlandet county, Norway.

The village is located about 7 kilometres (4.3 mi) south of the village of Rena, the municipal centre. The village of Åsta lies at the confluence of the rivers Åsta and Glomma.

The Norwegian National Road 3 runs through the village. The Rørosbanen railway line also passes through the village, stopping at Åsta Station.

Åsta was the site of the Åsta accident, which claimed 19 lives.
