= Public Transport Authority =

Public Transport Authority may refer to:

- Public Transport Authority (Denmark)
- Public Transport Authority (Warsaw)
- Public Transport Authority (Western Australia)
- Public Transportation Authority in Jämtland County
- Public transport authority as in transportation authority
