= Åsta accident =

2000 train crash in Åmot, Norway

Details
- Date: 4 January 2000; 13:12:25
- Location: Åsta, Åmot Municipality
- Country: Norway
- Line: Røros Line
- Incident type: Collision

Statistics
- Trains: 2
- Passengers: 86
- Deaths: 19

The Åsta accident was a railway accident that occurred at 13:12:25 on 4 January 2000 at Åsta in Åmot Municipality, Norway, south of Rena in Østerdalen. A train from Trondheim collided with a local train from Hamar on the Røros Line, resulting in an explosive fire. Nineteen people were killed, while 67 survived the accident.

== Account of the accident ==
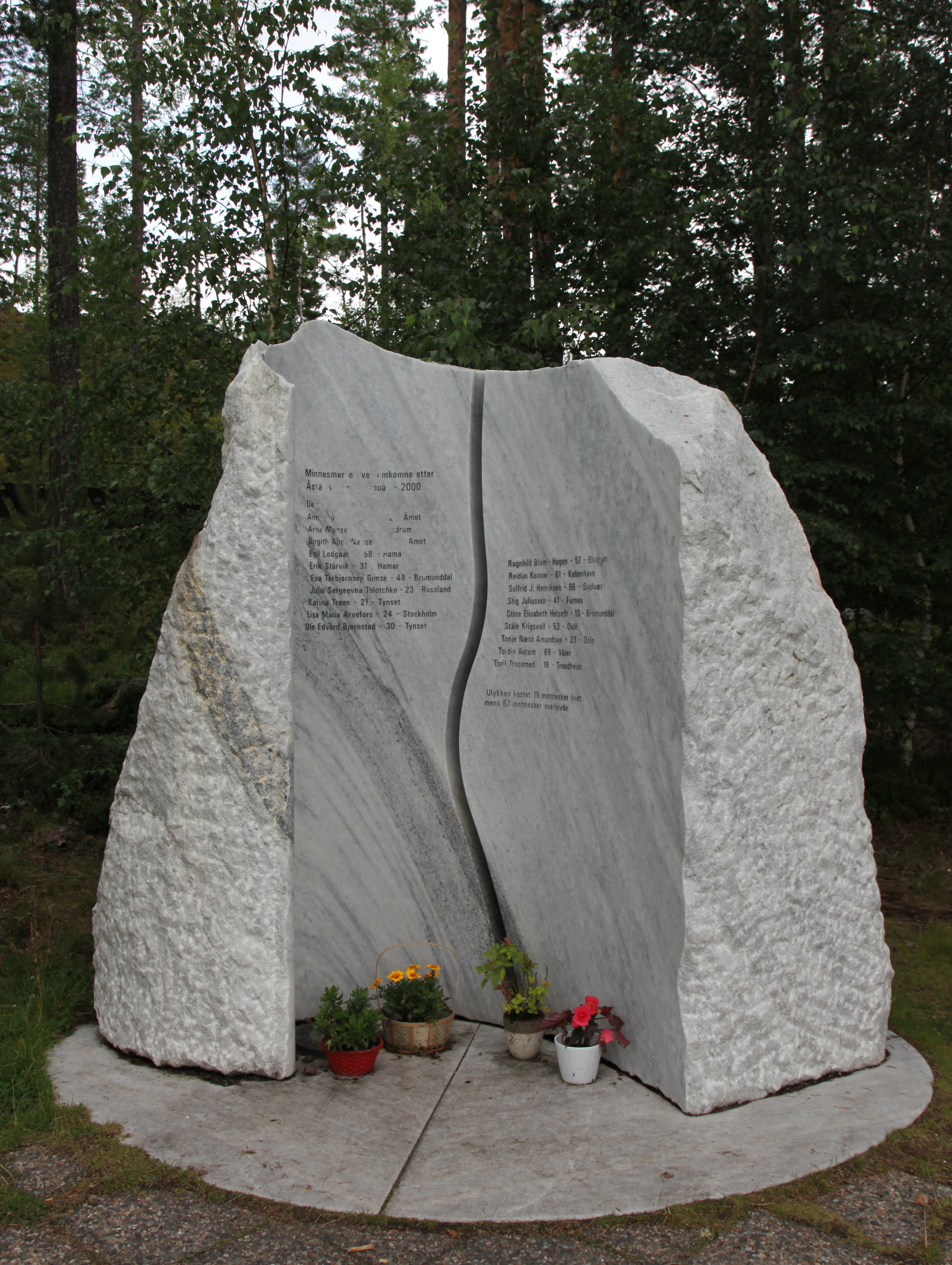
Memorial stone with the names of the 19 people who died in the accident

Southbound train 2302, a train hauled by a Di 3-class diesel locomotive, departed on schedule from Trondheim Central Station at 07:45 in the morning on Tuesday 4 January 2000 with 75 people on board. Its final destination was Hamar Station. Because connecting trains were running late, the train departure from Røros Station was 21 minutes late. The schedule delay was partially recovered, and by arrival and departure at Rena Station the train was running only 7 minutes late. At departure the signal showed green, and the log at the traffic control centre at Hamar after the accident showed that the south-bound signal on the main line was also green.

Northbound train 2369, a Class 92 diesel multiple unit, left Hamar Station on schedule at 12:30 with 10 passengers on board. The train was headed for Rena Station, after which it was to return to Hamar. At Rustad Station the train stopped to pick up one passenger at 13:06 and, according to the schedule, the train was supposed to have remain at Rustad until 13:10 to wait for the train from north. When the train left Rustad at 13:07 with 11 persons on board, including the engineer and conductor, the log shows that the signal did not show green. The log also revealed that the set of points at the exit had been forced open by the northbound train.

Traffic control on the Rørosbanen line between Hamar and Røros is controlled by the Train Control Centre at Hamar. The dispatcher there was also responsible for watching the more heavily trafficked stretch south from Hamar to Eidsvoll Station. There was no audible alarm installed to warn when two trains are on collision course on this stretch, and although a message in red print may have been visible on the screen warning that an accident was imminent, the traffic controller did not observe this visual warning until 13:11:30.

At the time of the accident, neither an Automatic Train Control (ATC, a system for automatically stopping trains) nor a train radio was installed on trains on the Røros Line. The only way to contact the trains was via mobile telephones. The mobile telephone numbers for the engineers and conductors on the trains had either been recorded on the wrong list, or had not been listed. Hence, by the time the traffic controller in Hamar recognised the problem, he was unable to determine which phone number to dial.

At 13:12:35 the trains collided at Kilometer 182,75 (61°04′08.1″N 011°21′02.9″E), killing many people.

== Aftermath ==
On 1 September 1997, the Norwegian National Rail Administration and the Norwegian State Railways had introduced new departure routines for passenger trains where only the engineer, and not both the engineer and conductor as before, was required to check that the main departure signal from a station showed "go" before the train started from a station. This was despite that the Norwegian Railway Inspectorate did not accept that the new departure procedures were to be introduced on the Røros Line, among other things because of the special conditions there. The Rail Inspectorate protested, also to the Norwegian Ministry of Transport and Communications, and got support there, without this changing the actual departure procedures.

== Impact on railway safety ==
=== Background ===
On 22 February 1975, the Tretten train disaster occurred on the Dovre Line, killing 27 people. The accident was very similar to the one at Åsta, as it was a head-on collision on a section with CTC, after the train driver had mis-read a stop signal. In that accident's aftermath, it was concluded that a stop signal was not sufficient and in 1976 NSB decided to install automatic train stop (ATS) on all electrified mainlines. A prototype of an ATS system was developed by SINTEF and tested om Espa station in 1971. However, the selected system was the ATC system that LM Ericsson developed for the Swedish state railways. From 1979 the system was rolled out on the main railway lines, including the Bergen, Dovre, Sørlandet, Ofoten, Østfold and Kongsvinger Lines. From 1995, also automatic train control (ATC) was rolled out, allowing not just stop signals, but also speed signals to be issued automatically.

In a 1989 report written by Det Norske Veritas for NSB, the continued roll-out of ATC was instrumental for retaining safety on the railway network. The report recommended that all lines in Norway with centralised traffic control (CTC) receive ATC by 1 January 1995. In particular, the Drammen Line between Oslo and Asker and the Vestfold Line lacked such implementation. In addition, the report stressed that all new lines receiving CTC should also receive ATC at the same time. Funding for hasten roll-out was given in 1992 and 1993, both on the Røros and the Eastern Østfold Line. The need for ATC was also specified in National Railway Plan 1994–97.

The CTC on the Røros Line south of Røros was completed in December 1994, but without ATC. This allowed the costly manning of stations (to manually operate the passing loops) to end. The plans for ATC were completed in November 1995, and then sent on public consultation. By April 1997, the planning process was completed. In the Norwegian Railway Plan 1998–2007, the Ministry of Transport and Communications explicitly stated that ATC, along with CTC and the train radio system Scanet was only to be built on lines where it was profitable. The Røros Line had ATC mentioned "in the medium term", but was not part of the ten-year plan. The plan was subsequently sanctioned by the Parliament of Norway. The reasons for not allocating money was in part because of cost overruns from building the Gardermoen Line, and in part because centrally placed people in NSB were uncertain if the Røros Line would be kept and if it was economical to make large investments in a line which would be closed.

=== Implementations ===
Scanet was replaced by Global System for Mobile Communications – Railway (GSM-R) in 2007. The system, delivered by Nokia Siemens Networks, was on time and on budget, and made Norway one of the first countries to fully implement the system throughout Europe. After GSM-R was fully implemented on 1 November, Scanet was gradually closed. The new system has been characterised as simpler to use and giving better audio quality than Scanet.

== Bibliography ==
- Gulowsen, Jon; Ryggvik, Helge (2004). Jernbanen i Norge 1854–2004: Ny tider og gamle spor 1940–2004 (in Norwegian). Bergen: Vogmostad & Bjørke. ISBN 82-419-0332-4.
- Haagenrud, Nils-Erik (June 2000). "Norway's train crash: learning from major incidents". Fire International (177). DMG World Media: 16–17. ISSN 0015-2609. OCLC 196692695. Archived from the original on 14 June 2012.
