= Norske Tog Class 92 =

Norske tog' class of 15 diesel multiple units

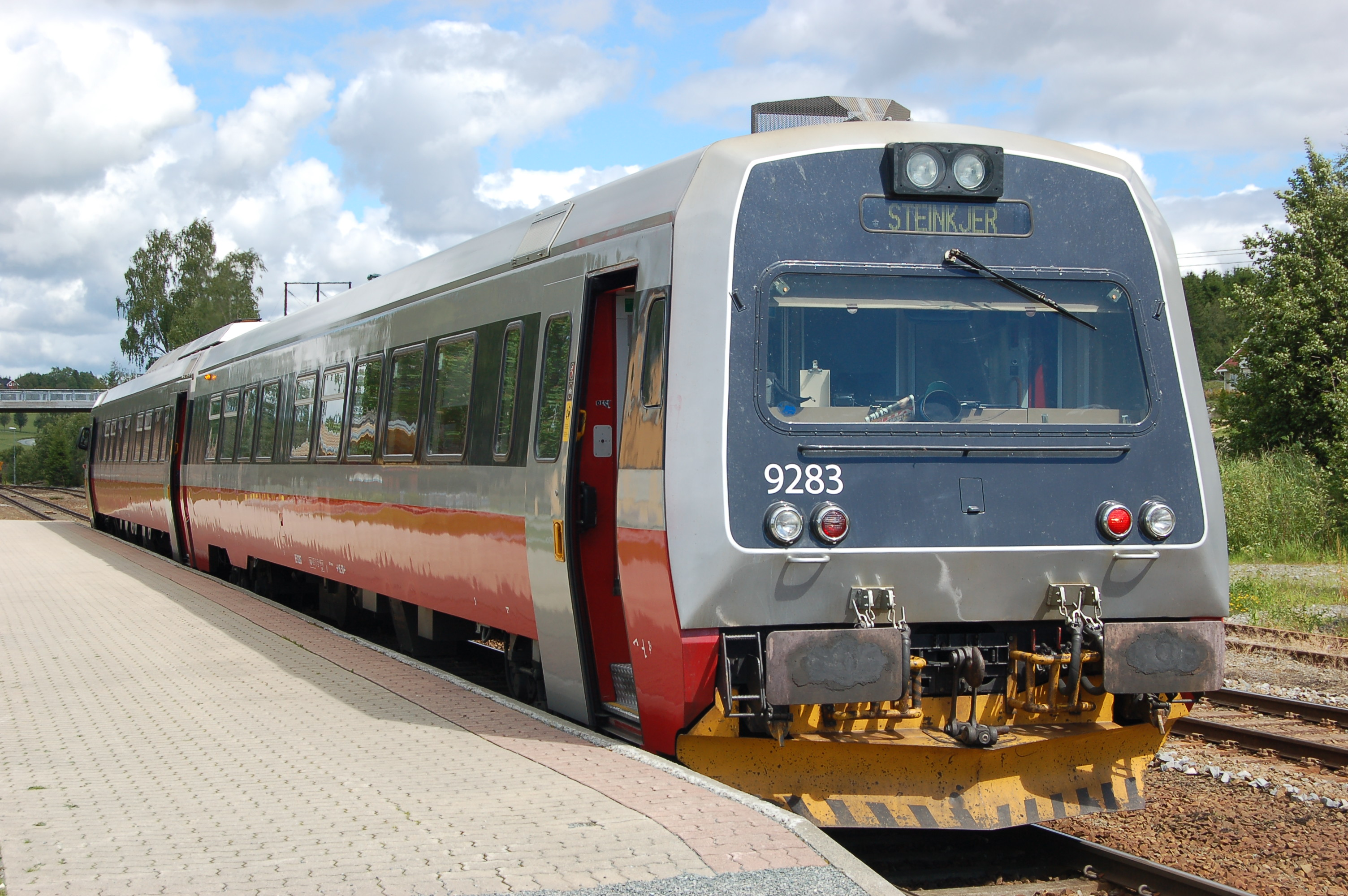
- In service: 1984–2021
- Manufacturer: Duewag
- Refurbished: 2005–2006
- Number built: 15 units
- Formation: 2 cars
- Operator: SJ Norge
- Lines served: Trøndelag Commuter Rail; Mittnabotåget

Specifications
- Train length: 49.45 m (162 ft 3 in) (two cars)
- Maximum speed: 140 km/h (87 mph)
- Weight: 58.3 t (57.4 long tons; 64.3 short tons) (motor car); 38.0 t (37.4 long tons; 41.9 short tons) (steering car)
- Prime mover: 714 kW (957 hp)
- Track gauge: 1,435 mm (4 ft 8 1/2 in)

Norske tog Class 92 (Norwegian: type 92) is a class of 15 diesel multiple units built by Duewag for the Norwegian State Railways (NSB). The two-car trains were delivered in 1984 and 1985, and were put into service on the Røros Line and southern part of the Nordland Line—which later became the Trøndelag Commuter Rail. Later, they also entered service on the Meråker Line as part of the international Mittnabotåget service. Previously, the trains were also used on the Solør Line, further north on the Nordland Line and on the now electrified Arendal Line. In 2000, a unit was involved in the Åsta accident; which killed 19 people. The trains were refurbished in 2005 and 2006, and NSB plans to replace them by around 2019. Each twin unit seats 168 people, is 49.45 meters (162 ft 3 in) long and weighs 92 tonnes (91 long tons; 101 short tons). The front car is powered with two electric motors, giving a power output of 714 kilowatts (957 hp) and a maximum speed of 140 kilometers per hour (87 mph).

== History ==
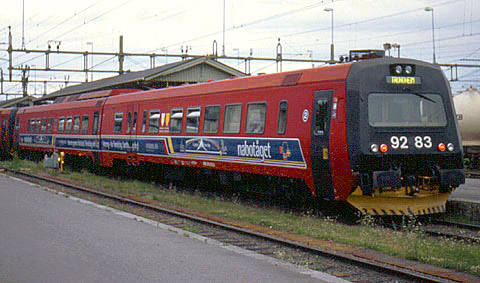
A train in the old livery with Mittnabotåget design

By the 1980s, the 40-year-old Class 86 and Class 91 trains were in need of replacement. NSB described them as unable to satisfy demands in terms of economy, comfort or speed. Class 92 was bought to take over all passenger transport on the Røros Line and on the Nordland Line south of Grong Municipality. The 15 two-car units cost NOK 200 million and were built by Duewag in Germany.

When introduced, the schedules were also changed to cut a number of the smallest intermediate stops. Class 92 has considerably better curve speed, and is able to operate at least at 80 km/h (50 mph) through all curves on the main lines and on the steepest sections. It also features better acceleration and deceleration than its predecessors. With the change of schedules from 2 June 1985, this resulted in travel time between Røros Station and Hamar Station being reduced by one hour, a reduction of 25 minutes between Trondheim Station and Steinkjer Station, and a reduction of 50 minutes between Trondheim and Grong. At the same time, the schedules were changed for optimal correspondence, such as with the night train in Trondheim and departures from Trondheim Airport, Værnes. The Røros Line also received a single daily through train from Røros to Oslo.

From June 1986, the class was also put into the morning train from Mo i Rana to Trondheim and the return trip in the evening. The new service increased the average speed, including stops, to 80 kilometres per hour (50 mph) and a maximum speed on straight section of 130 kilometres per hour (81 mph), as well as 10 percent higher speeds in curves. The service allowed passengers taking the morning train from Oslo to arrive in Mo i Rana in the evening. The class was also used on the Arendal Line and the Solør Line. It remained in used on the Arendal Line until 1995, when the line was electrified.

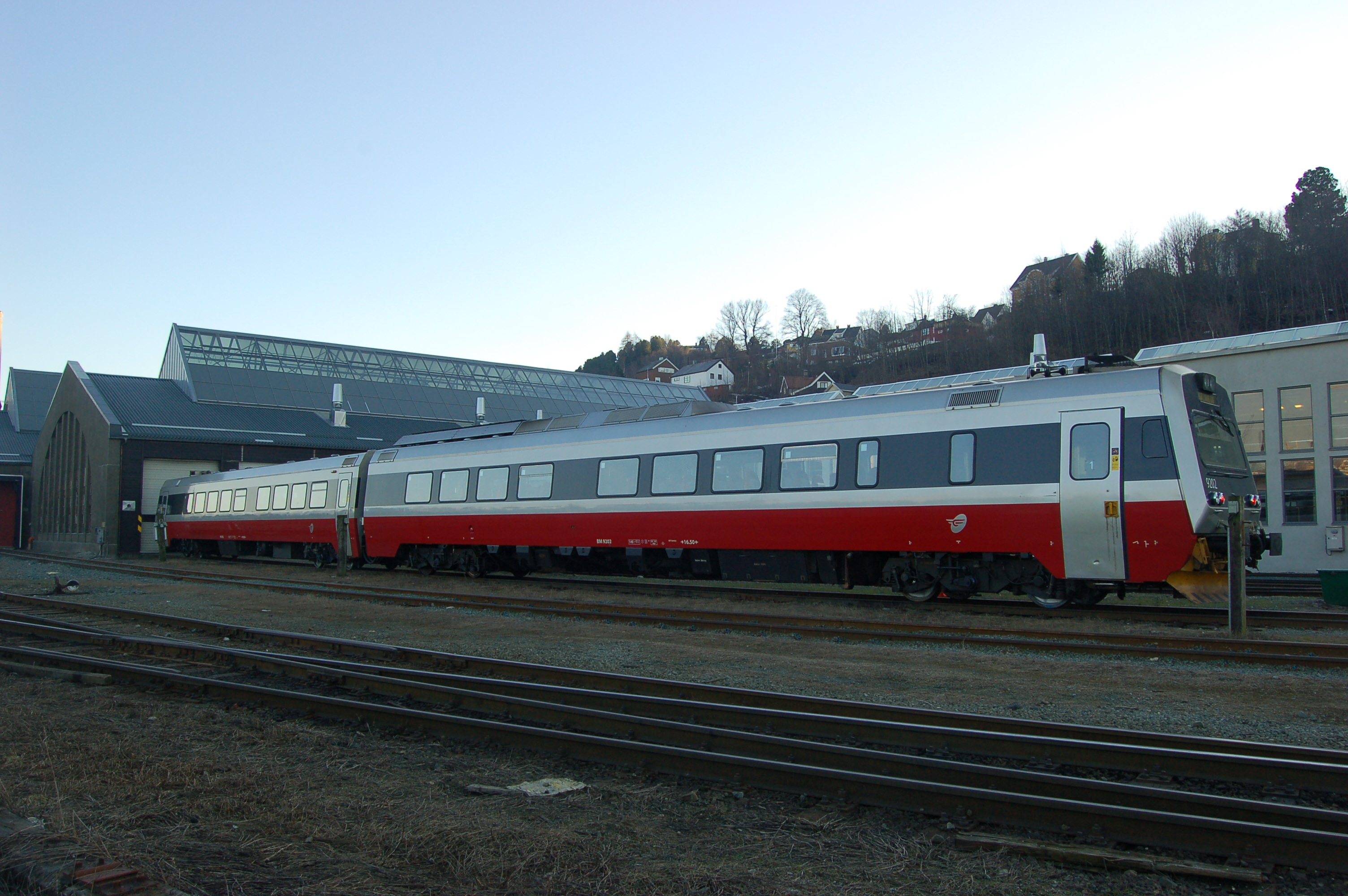
A Class 92 train at Marienborg

In 1993, NSB announced that the traffic around Trondheim would become the Trøndelag Commuter Rail, which would take over most of the Class 92 trains. The service started on 1 September 1993. The changes to the schedule involved almost a doubling of the number of departures, particularly between Trondheim and Stjørdal, where a one-hour headway was introduced. The service from Trondheim to Steinkjer had ten daily round trips. While local trains had existed previously north of Trondheim, the services south to Oppdal were all new in an area which was previously only served by intercity and night trains. The initial services consisted of four services from Trondheim—northwards along the Nordland Line to Steinkjer, east along the Meråker Line to Storlien, south along the Dovre Line to Oppdal and south-east along the Røros Line to Tynset.

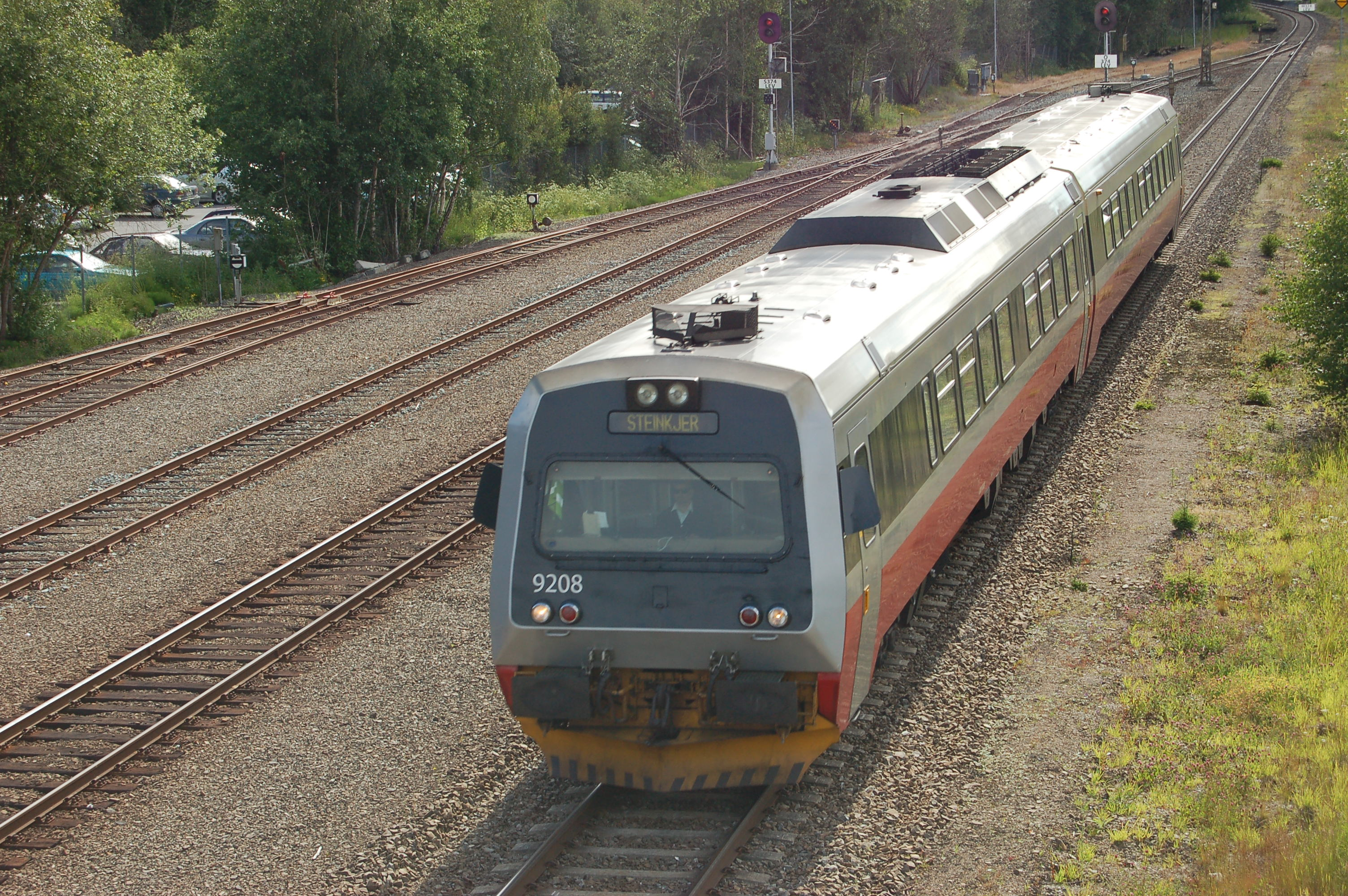
A Class 92 at Levanger Station

On 4 January 2000, a Class 92 train was damaged beyond repair in the Åsta accident near Åsta Station on the Røros Line. Nineteen people were killed in the accident. From 7 January 2001, NSB made several major changes to the commuter rail. A fixed, hourly headway was introduced on the trains from Steinkjer to Trondheim; including extra rush-hour trains from Lerkendal to Stjørdal, giving 23 departures per day in each direction. South of Trondheim, the service was rerouted to terminate at Lerkendal. Part of the reason for the expansion was that the delivery of the new Class 93 trains for regional services freed up more Class 92 units. This also allowed NSB to operate some of services with double unit (four-car) trains in rush-hour.

From 22 September 2002, NSB and the Public Transportation Authority in Jämtlands County started a cooperation that involved two daily round trips with Class 92 trains between Trondheim and Östersund in Sweden, on the Meråker Line and Central Line. Branded as Mittnabotåget, the trains were manned by NSB on the Norwegian side of the border, and by BK Tåg staff on the Swedish side, after the latter had won a public service obligation contract with the Swedish authority.

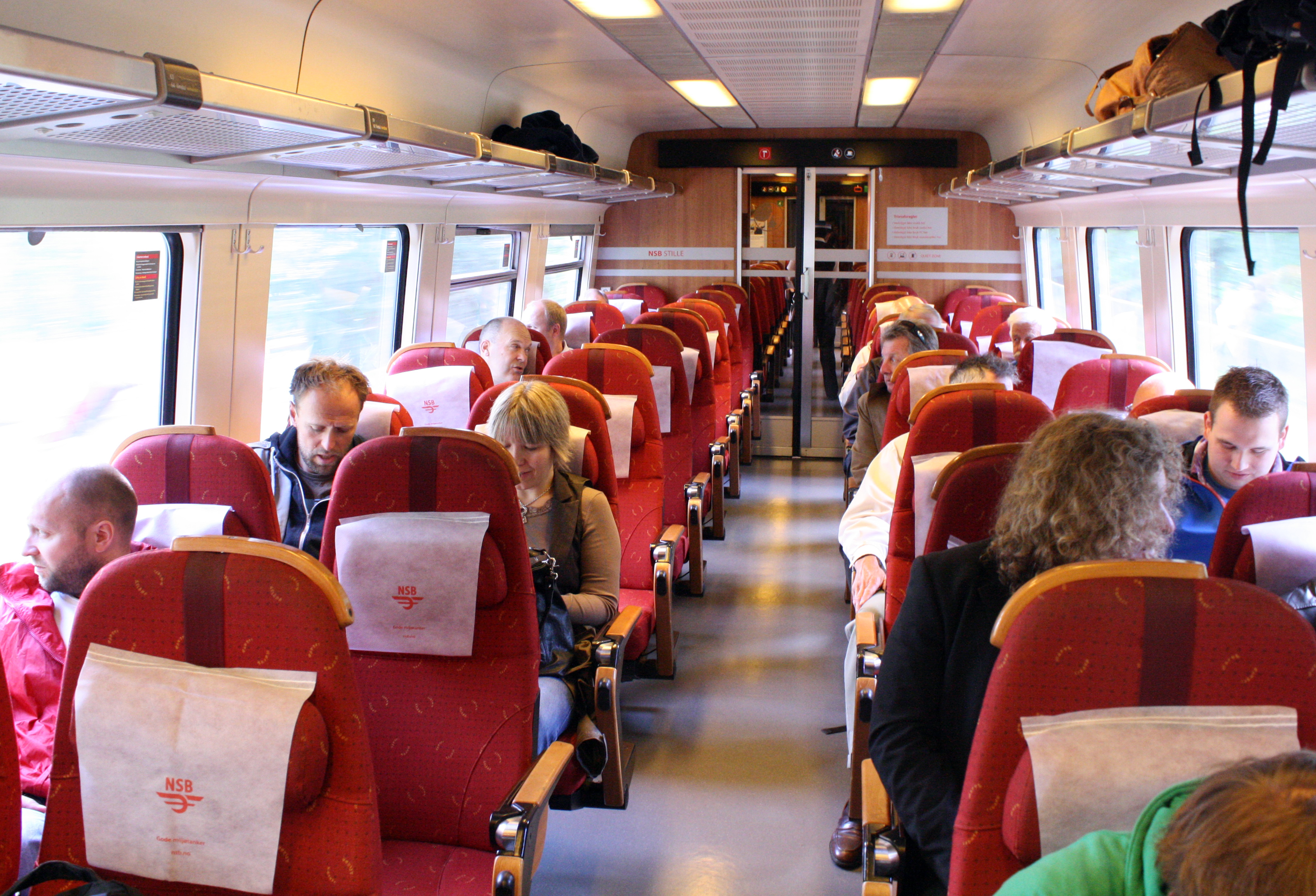
Interior

The class was upgraded in 2005 and 2006, which included given them a new interior and a new paint scheme. NSB has stated that the last year the Class 92 will be in use is 2019. There are plans to electrify the Nordland Line from Trondheim to Steinkjer, as well as the Meråker Line. Once these lines are electrified, the Class 92 can be retired, although no date has yet been set. During May and June 2012 all NSB Class 92 trains based in Trondheim were fitted with free wireless Internet access for the passengers.

In March 2023 the Norwegian Minister of Transport informed that Norway will donate 12 type 92 units to Ukraine, on the background of the Russian invasion of Ukraine in 2022. Since August 2024 are all units out of service.

== Specifications ==
The units were built by Duewag in 1984 and 1985 and consist of two cars, giving a seating capacity of 168 people. A double-unit is 49.45 meters (162 ft 3 in) long and weighs 92 tonnes (91 long tons; 101 short tons), of which the motor car weighs 58 tonnes (57 long tons; 64 short tons). Only the one car is powered, and is equipped with two Daimler-Benz OM424A prime movers which powers two electric motors, giving a power output of 714 kilowatts (957 hp). The trains are capable of 140 kilometers per hour (87 mph) and are equipped with vending machines. The trailer units were delivered with three different layouts: with standard seating, with seating and a freight room, and with seating and a freight and post room. The latter was planned used on the Røros Line, but after delivery, the railway postal service was closed.
