= Drøyli Tunnel =

- Interactive map of Drøyli Tunnel

Overview
- Line: Rørosbanen
- Location: Trøndelag, Norway
- Coordinates: 62.8814°N 11.1892°E
- Status: In use
- System: Norwegian railways

Operation
- Opened: 7 July 1945
- Owner: Bane NOR
- Operator: Norwegian Railway Directorate
- Traffic: Rail

Technical
- Length: 1,181 m (3,875 ft)
- No. of tracks: Single
- Track gauge: 1,435 mm (4 ft 8 1/2 in)
- Electrified: No

The Drøyli Tunnel is 1,181-meter (3,875 ft) railway tunnel in Holtålen Municipality in Trøndelag county, Norway. The tunnel goes through the mountain Drøyliene, just east of the river Gaula. The tunnel carries a single, non-electrified track of the Røros Line. It is located about half-way between the villages of Haltdalen and Renbygda.

The line past Drøyliene was originally planned with several viaducts. During construction it was decided to instead build the line as a series of cuttings and six tunnels. Tamlaget Tunnel was the longest, at 204 meters (669 ft). This section opened on 16 January 1877. The original right-of-way through Drøyliene was plagued with rock slides and would fill with snow during winter. Proposals for replacing it with a tunnel were first made in 1924, but work did not start until 1937, in conjunction with the gauge conversion of the railway. The break-through took place in 1943 and the tunnel opened on 7 July 1945.

== Specifications ==
The Drøyli Tunnel has a length of 1,181 meters (3,875 ft) and carries a single track of non-electrified, standard gauge railway. Situated on the Røros Line, the southern end is situated 446.09 kilometers (277.19 mi) from Oslo Central Station.

== History ==
During the construction of the Røros Line between 1872 and 1877, the section past Drøyliene proved to be one of the most challenging to build. The originally surveyed route consisting of a series of viaducts had to be abandoned in favor of blasting the route out of bedrock. This was done through a mix of cuttings and tunnels. Construction was made more difficult after it was discovered that the quarry near by which did not meet standards, and that stone and gravel had to be transported up to 50 kilometers (31 mi) to the site. By June 1975 the line was completed to Drøya Bridge, allowing the stones and gravel to be transported by train. The work resulted in six short tunnels, measuring from 18 to 204 meters (59 to 669 ft) in length. There was also a narrow curve with a radius of 205 meters (673 ft). The longest, Tamlaget Tunnel, was on the line's opening on 16 January 1877 the second-longest railway tunnel in Norway. None of the shorter tunnels received names.

The section was prone to landslides during the summer and heavy snowfall during the winter, making it an operational headache for the Norwegian State Railways. The particularities of Drøyliene meant that as little snowfall as 5 to 10 centimeters (2 to 4 in) could be caught by the wind and blown into and filling the cutting, hindering traffic or causing trains to get stuck. Proposals for replacing the section was made as early as 1924. The proposal called for a 526-meter (1,726 ft) tunnel. No funding was granted, and the plans were shelved until the decision for the Røros Line to receive gauge conversion to standard gauge. The 1935 decision called for a longer tunnel, which would be built as a branch of the existing Tamlaget Tunnel. The new tunnel became 1,181 meters (3,875 ft) long, with the southernmost 146 meters (479 ft) being common with the old tunnel.

Construction commenced in the fall of 1937, with the tunnel hand drilled from both ends. Machine drilling was taken into use on the northern end on the northern side from the summer of 1938. The work on the Drøyli Tunnel was not finished in time for the gauge conversion in 1941, causing the cutting to have to be expanded. The tunnel's breakthrough occurred in 1943 and it could be taken into use on 7 July 1945. The tunnel shortened the Røros Line 276 meters (906 ft).

The tracks along Drøyliene were removed, but the telecommunication line was kept. The right-of-way and telecommunication lines have been listed as cultural heritage as remnants of the original narrow-gauge route of the Rørøs Line. The listing involves that the route is kept free of vegetation, loose rock is removed from the mountainside and the telephone cables and masts are retained.

== Bibliography ==
- Bjerke, Thor; Stenersen, Roar (2004). Rørosbaneboka (in Norwegian). Hamar: Norwegian Railway Museum / Norwegian Railway Club. ISBN 8290286244.
- Bjerke, Thor; Holom, Finn (2004). Banedata 2004 (in Norwegian). Hamar / Oslo: Norwegian Railway Museum / Norwegian Railway Club. ISBN 8290286287.
