= Røros Line =

Railway line through the districts of Hedmarken, Østerdalen and Gauldalen, Norway

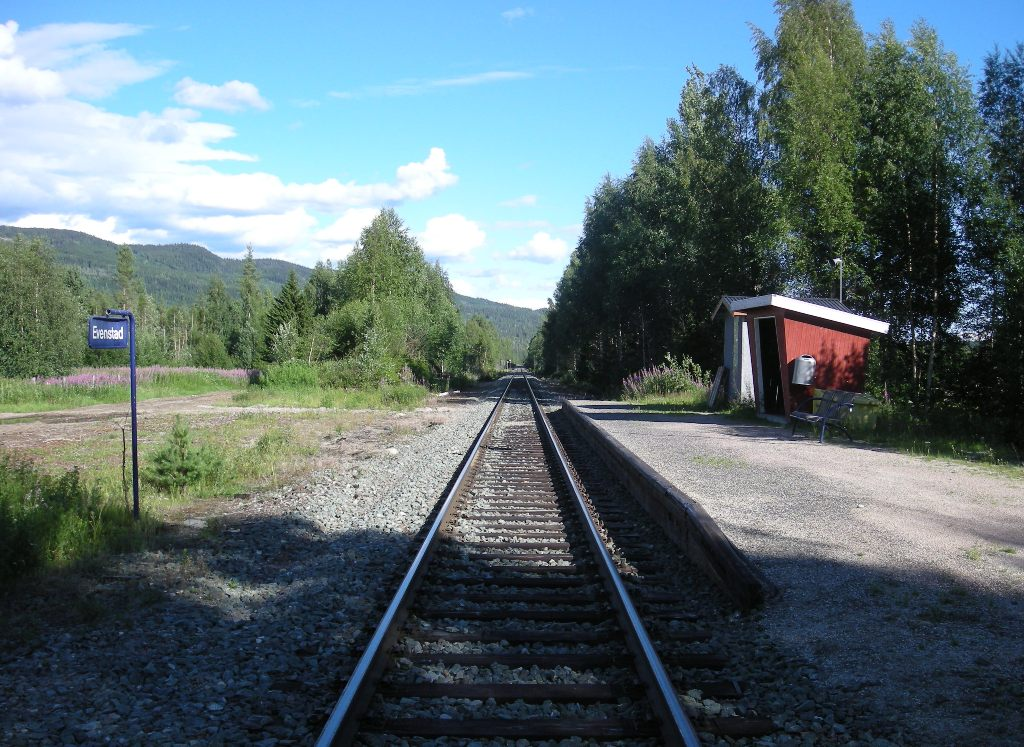
- Evenstad Station in Stor-Elvdal Municipality

Overview
- Native name: Rørosbanen
- Status: Active
- Owner: Bane NOR
- Termini: Hamar; Støren
- Stations: 28

Service
- Type: Railway
- System: Norwegian railway
- Operator: SJ Norge
- Rolling stock: Class 92, Class 93

History
- Opened: 23 June 1862 (Hamar–Grundset); 13 October 1877 (completion)

Technical
- Line length: 383 km (238 mi)
- Number of tracks: Single
- Character: Regional passenger
- Track gauge: 1,435 mm (4 ft 8 1/2 in) standard gauge
- Old gauge: 1,067 mm (3 ft 6 in)
- Electrification: No
- Highest elevation: 670 metres (2,198 ft)

The Røros Line (Norwegian: Rørosbanen) is a 383-kilometer (238 mi) railway line which runs through the districts of Hedmarken, Østerdalen, and Gauldalen in Innlandet and Trøndelag, Norway. The line branches off from the Dovre Line at Hamar Station and runs a more easterly route to Støren Station, where the two lines meet again. The Røros Line also intersects with the Solør Line at Elverum Station. The single track, standard gauge line lacks electrification and only has centralized traffic control south of Røros Station. SJ Norge operate regional passenger trains. In addition the line is used by freight trains hauling lumber and wood chippings.

The first parts of the line was the Hamar–Grundset Line and the Trondhjem–Støren Line, which opened on 23 June 1862 and 5 August 1964, respectively. To save costs, the lines were built with narrow gauge, thus making it the first locomotive-hauled 1,067 mm (3 ft 6 in) line in Norway. The Grundset–Aamot Line extension to Rena Station was opened on 19 October 1871. The connecting line onwards to Støren opened on 13 October 1877. The 1880 completion of the Dovre Line to Hamar allowed a continuous train service linking Oslo and Trondheim, albeit with a break-of-gauge in Hamar.

The line remained the main north–south link in Norway until the 1921 completion of the Dovre Line. Since then, the Røros Line has been relegated to regional passenger and freight trains, losing most of the through traffic. Gauge conversion started with dual gauge on parts of the line in 1917. South of Koppang Station standard gauge was taken into use from 1931, north of there from 1941. There are plans to electrify and install European Train Control System during the early 2020s, which would allow the Røros Line to act as a reserve for the Dovre Line.

== Route ==
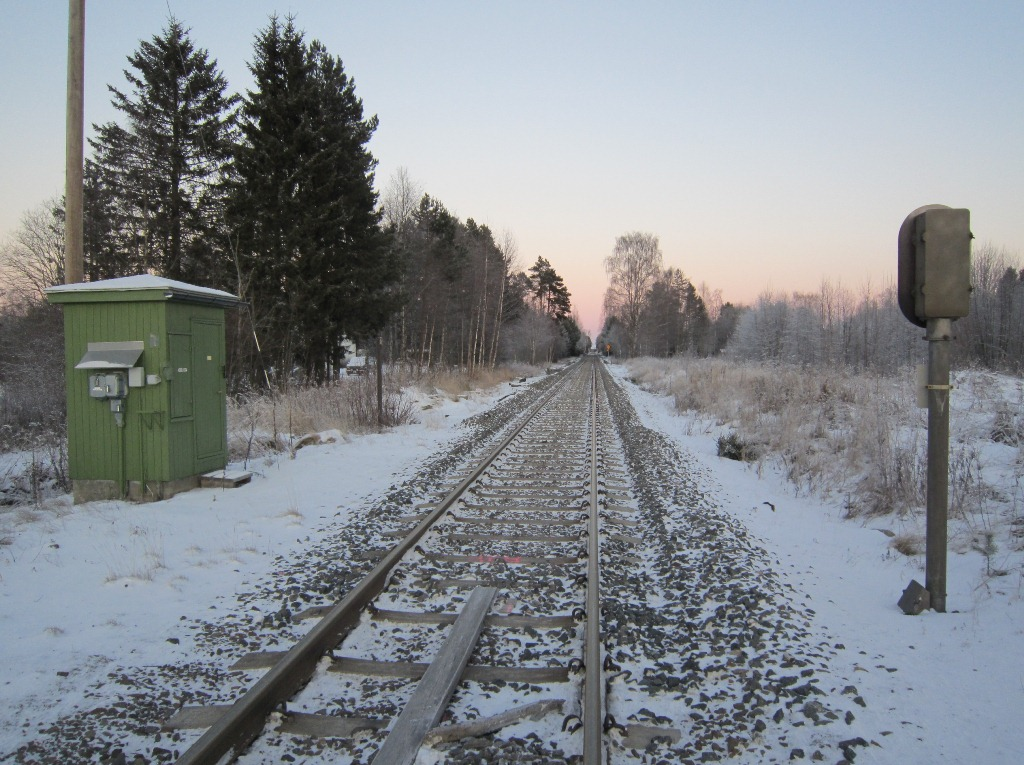
The site of the now closed Roset Station

The 93.6-kilometer (58.2 mi) Røros Line runs between Støren Station and Hamar Station, both located on the Dovre Line. The line runs through the district of Gauldalen in the county of Trøndelag from Støren to Røros before crossing the border to the county of Hedmark. It continues southwards through the district and valley of Østerdalen until Elverum Station, after which is crosses over to the district of Hedmarken. Through Gauldalen the line largely follows the river Gaula, a section which is hilly with many curves and limited speed. Through Østerdalen the landscape is more level, allowing for a straighter and faster line. Until Elverum the line largely follows the river Glomma.

The Røros Line branches off from the Dovre Line at Hamar Station, situated 126.26 kilometers (78.45 mi) from Oslo Central Station at an elevation of 127 meters (417 ft). At Elverum Station, 32.12 kilometers (19.96 mi) from Hamar, the line intersects with the Solør Line. The Røros Line reaches its highest elevation, of 670 meters (2,200 ft), is located just north of the closed Harborg Station in Røros. Støren Station is situated 510.37 kilometers (317.13 mi) from Oslo, at an elevation of 66 meters (217 ft). The Røros Line has limited capacity compared to other longer lines in Norway due to few and short passing loops. The line has single track and standard gauge, but is not electrified. It has a simplified centralized traffic control and automatic train control between Hamar and Røros, but lacks this north of the latter. It is equipped with GSM-R train radio. The railway line is owned and maintained by the Norwegian National Rail Administration.

== History ==
=== Trondhjem–Støren and Hamar–Grundset ===
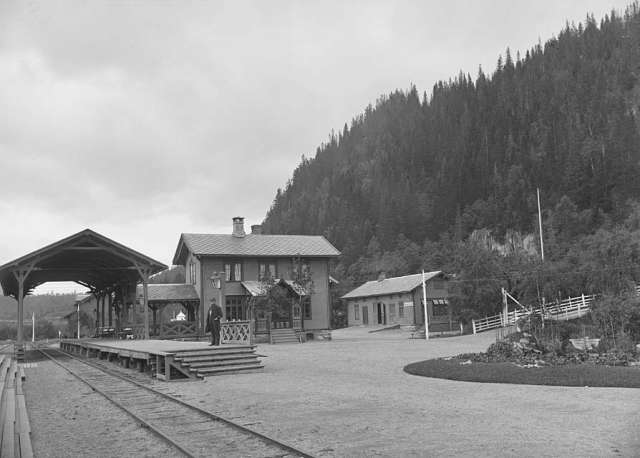
Støren Station during the 1880s

Following the successful construction of the Trunk Line from Oslo and Eidsvoll Station in 1854, proposals were made for other projects, even a line to connect the capital with Trondheim. The start of the Røros Line would, however, be tied to two smaller railway projects which instead would serve regional needs. Both had their basis in the need for hauling lumber along difficult terrain. After local initiatives, the Ministry of the Interior gave Carl Abraham Pihl the task of preliminary surveys of two routes. In Sør-Trøndelag a route from Trondheim to Støren Station was considered, while in Hedmark the a route was proposed which would link Østerdalen to Hamar, where cargo and passengers could be transshipped and freighted by ship down the lake Mjøsa to Eidsvoll.

These two lines were planned by the ministry along with the Kongsvinger Line. The Trunk Line had been built by and was owned by an English company, and the government was not satisfied with the private arrangement. They therefore recommended that the three lines be built as state railways. The government would borrow money, build and operate the lines, covering any deficits. However, local municipalities, counties and private individuals and companies were required to participate in the funding through the issuing of shares in the individual lines. This model of financing would remain for decades. Parliament approved the three lines on 3 September 1857.

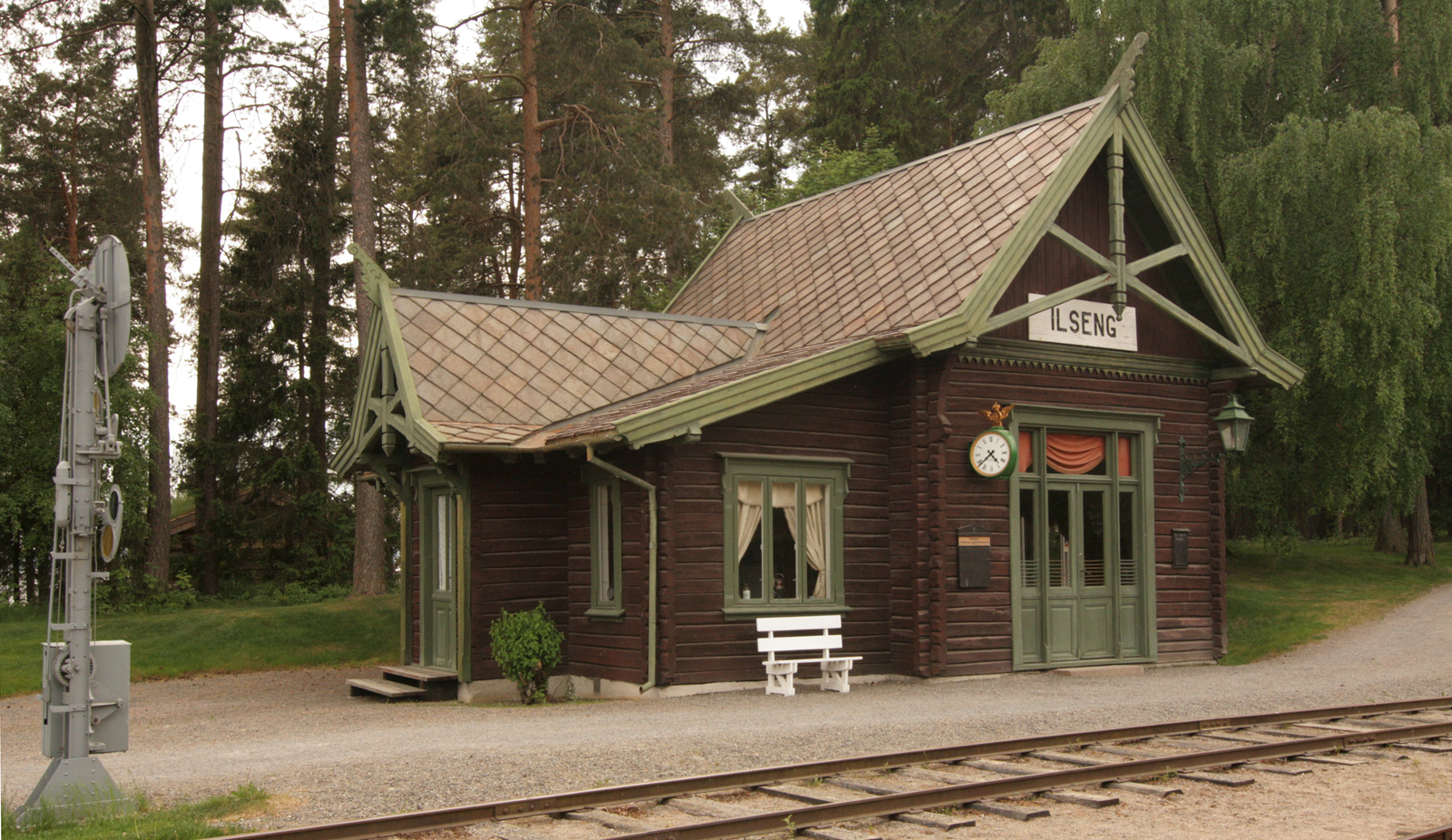
The original Ilseng Station is on display at the Norwegian Railway Museum in Hamar

In order to cut costs, Pihl recommended that the line be built using narrow gauge. This would allow for smaller curve radii and cheaper construction. A major drawback was that the lines would not be compatible with Swedish lines and the Trunk Line. Aiding in his cause, it was at the time not believed that the lines would ever connect, as lakes and rivers were seen as complementary to railways. Pihl opted for the 1067 mm gauge, for which the Hamar–Grundset Line became the first locomotive-hauled system. It would soon become the most used narrow gauge in the world.

Originally the Hamar Line was approved to Elverum, with a terminus on the east side of Glomma. A group of forest owners petitioned that a 6-kilometer (3.7 mi) branch be built on the west shore in order to negotiate a difficult part of the river. A channel was initially proposed and would have been slightly cheaper, but on 7 October 1859 Parliament approved that the line be extended to Grundset and that Elverum Station would be placed on the west shore. Construction began in September 1858. Groundwork had progressed sufficiently that the first 8 kilometers (5.0 mi) of tracks were laid in 1860. Two locomotives were delivered in August and could aid in construction. The following year the stations were built and the telegraph service from Hamar to Elverum opened on 1 March. The line initially received 18 kilograms per meter (37 lb/ft) rails. Revenue service from Hamar to Løten commenced on 1 July. By 3 September trains were running to Midtskog, by 22 October to Elverum and by 4 November 1861. The official opening took place on 23 June 1862.

Detailed surveying of the Trondhjem–Støren Line started in September 1858. Groundwork started in August 1859, initially near Trondheim were the plans were clear. Work on the three southerly sections commenced the following year, after the routes had been finalized. By 1861 the number of construction workers had risen to 900. The most challenging part was between Lundamo and Hovin, where the route had to be cut into hilly terrain. Compared to other contemporary Norwegian railways, the line had many large bridges, built of wood. There were several fatal accidents during the work. The first two locomotives were delivered in 1862, allowing ballast to be hauled by rail. Construction ended at 2.86 million kroner, just under budget. The first revenue freight train ran on 23 January 1864. Revenue passenger trains started running on 1 April. The line initially received three locomotives, sixty freight cars and ten passenger cars. The official opening took place on 5 August.

=== Construction Grundset–Støren ===
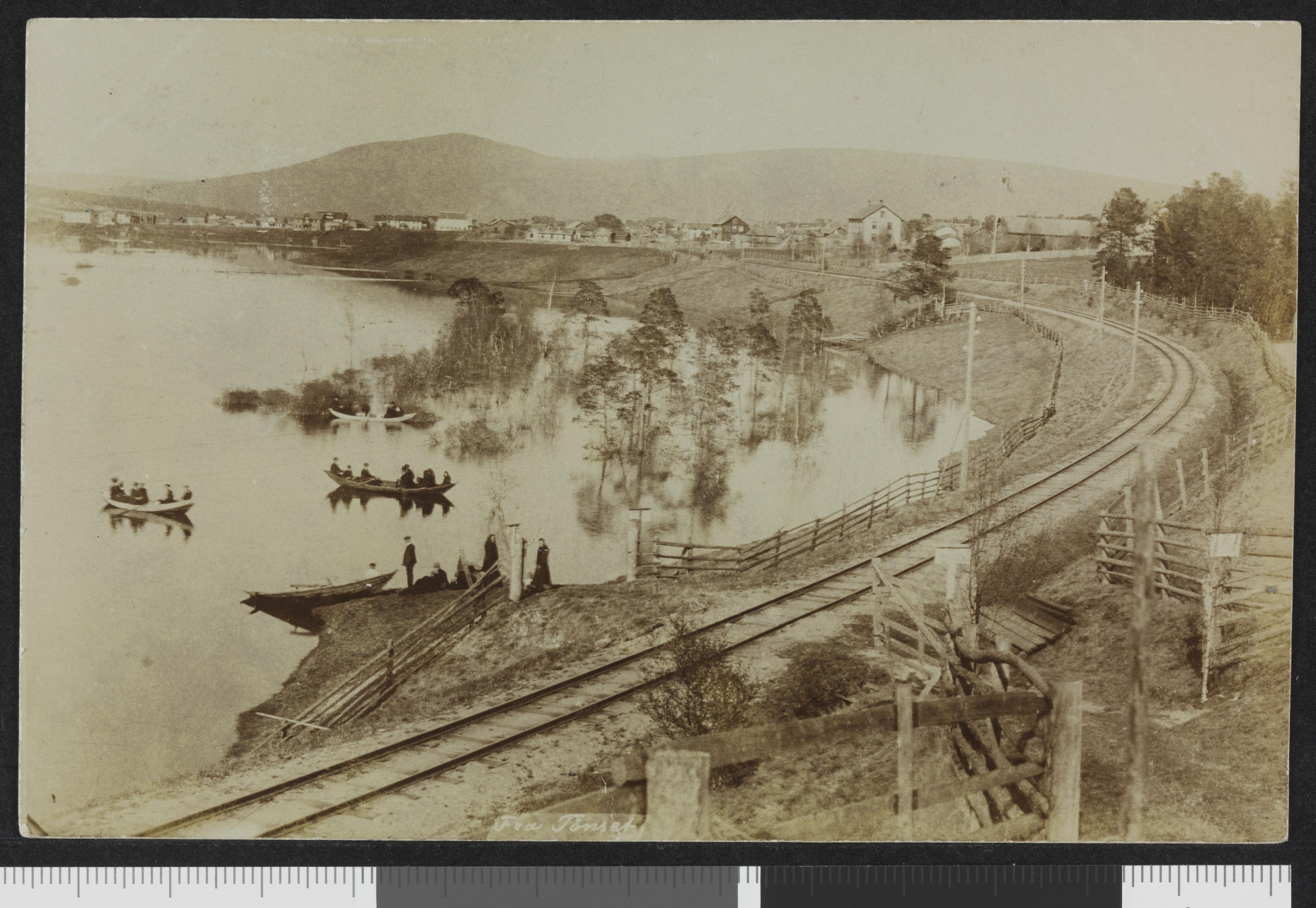
The line through Tynset sometime between 1907 and 1912

Proposals for an extension from Grundset to Åmot was made in 1864, which would allow the railway to connect to the steamships operating on Storsjøen, by placing the end station at Rena where the river Renaelva empties into Glomma. This part of the line was less controversial than later parts and was approved by Parliament with 80 against 21 votes. The 26-kilometer (16 mi) segment was initially named the Grundset–Aamot Line. Construction started soon after the parliamentary decision and was easy due to the flat valley the line was built through. Grundset Station was dismantled and the station building moved to Rena Station, the new terminus. The depot and turntable were moved to Elverum Station, which received an upgrade. The line was operational in September 1871 and officially opened on 19 October.

Proposals for a railway connecting Støren and Røros were proposed by the Governor of Sør-Trøndelag in 1864. The government approved preliminary surveys the following year. These included extensions southwards through Østerdalen. There were two route proposals—one running via Røros and one via Kvikne. The latter would have lower peak altitude and would be 31 kilometers (19 mi) shorter. However, it would involve a 46-kilometer (29 mi) branch line from Tynset to Røros. The Kvikne and Røros alternatives were part of the discussion to the very end. Parliament approved the line via Røros with 67 against 44 votes on 3 May 1872.

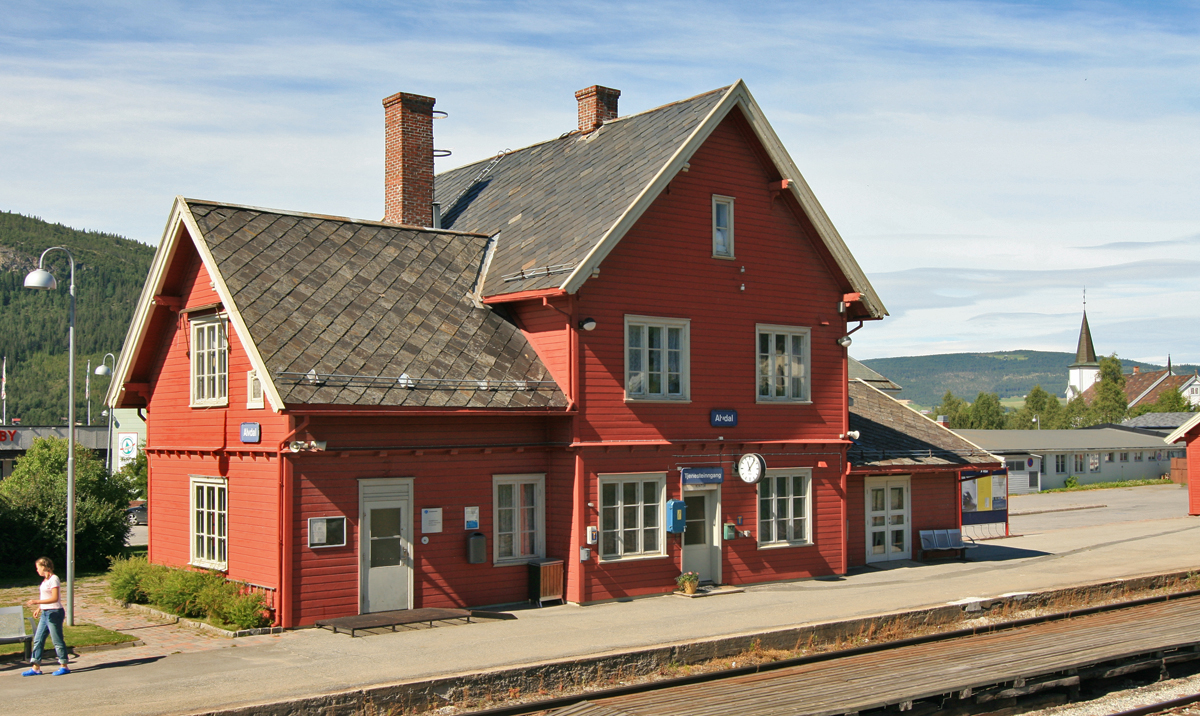
The gauge may have changed, but the original Alvdal Station still stands—with an annex.

Construction between Rena and Støren commenced during the fall of 1872, and by the following summer of 1873 there were 900 people working on the line. the most demanding part was through Ålen Municipality where a large amount of blasting was needed. A challenge was that during the fall harvest many people returned to the farms, with only half the men left for construction work. By March 1874 the workforce peaked at 2,100 men. That year there was a short strike, following demands for higher wages, which had been set at 1.75 kroner per day. Construction problems were the most severe in Gauldalen and Drøyliene; at the latter the Tamlaget Tunnel had to be built. Another challenge was the reliable sourcing of lumber; forest owners were often not willing to sign contracts and the railway often had to cut its own timber.

The 56.2-kilometer (34.9 mi) section from Rena to Koppang Station was taken into use on 14 December 1875. It was followed by the 30.4-kilometer (18.9 mi) section from Støren to Singsås Station on 4 January 1876, although temporary freight traffic had been conducted since 12 February 1875. Temporary traffic between Trondheim and Røros commenced on 17 November 1876 and was taken into ordinary use on 16 January 1877, following the completion of the 79.1 kilometers (49.2 mi) from Singsås to Røros. Regular service on the final segment, the 152.5 kilometers (94.8 mi) from Røros to Koppang, commenced on 17 October. The official opening of the entire line between Rena and Støren took place on 13 October.

=== Narrow-gauge operations ===
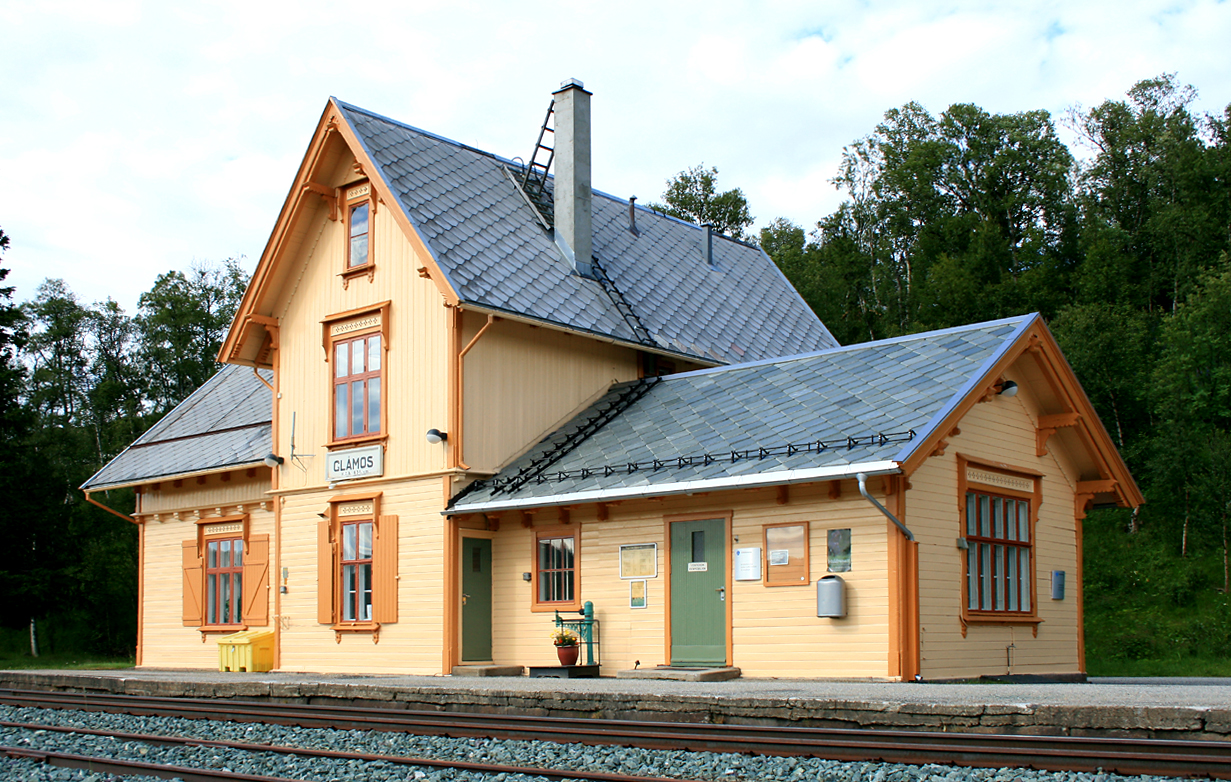
Glåmos Station has been listed as a heritage site.

Operations on the Hamar Line initially consisted of a single daily round trip, increasing to two on weekdays from 1867. The cargo load was asymmetrical, with five times as much being freighted westwards as eastwards. The railway initially had three locomotives. Also between Trondheim and Støren there was initially only a single daily round trip, increasing to two from 1870. Traffic was above prognosis, soon resulting in the ordering of additional rolling stock. There was more than twice as much cargo heading southwards as northwards.

A daily through train between Hamar and Trondheim was introduced with the opening of the line in 1877. It connected with a morning train and steamship departure from Oslo, and required an overnight stay in Koppang. The train stopped the following day at Røros for dinner, with arrival in Trondheim that evening. Parliament approved the first stage of the Dovre Line in 1875, opening between Eidsvoll and Hamar on 8 November 1880. This allowed a significant cut in travel time and from 1881 direct services were introduced, with travel times from Oslo to Trondheim at 24 hours and 15 minutes. At first this ran only during the summer, but from 1885 it ran all year. The cheaper trains with an overnight in Koppang continued to be run.

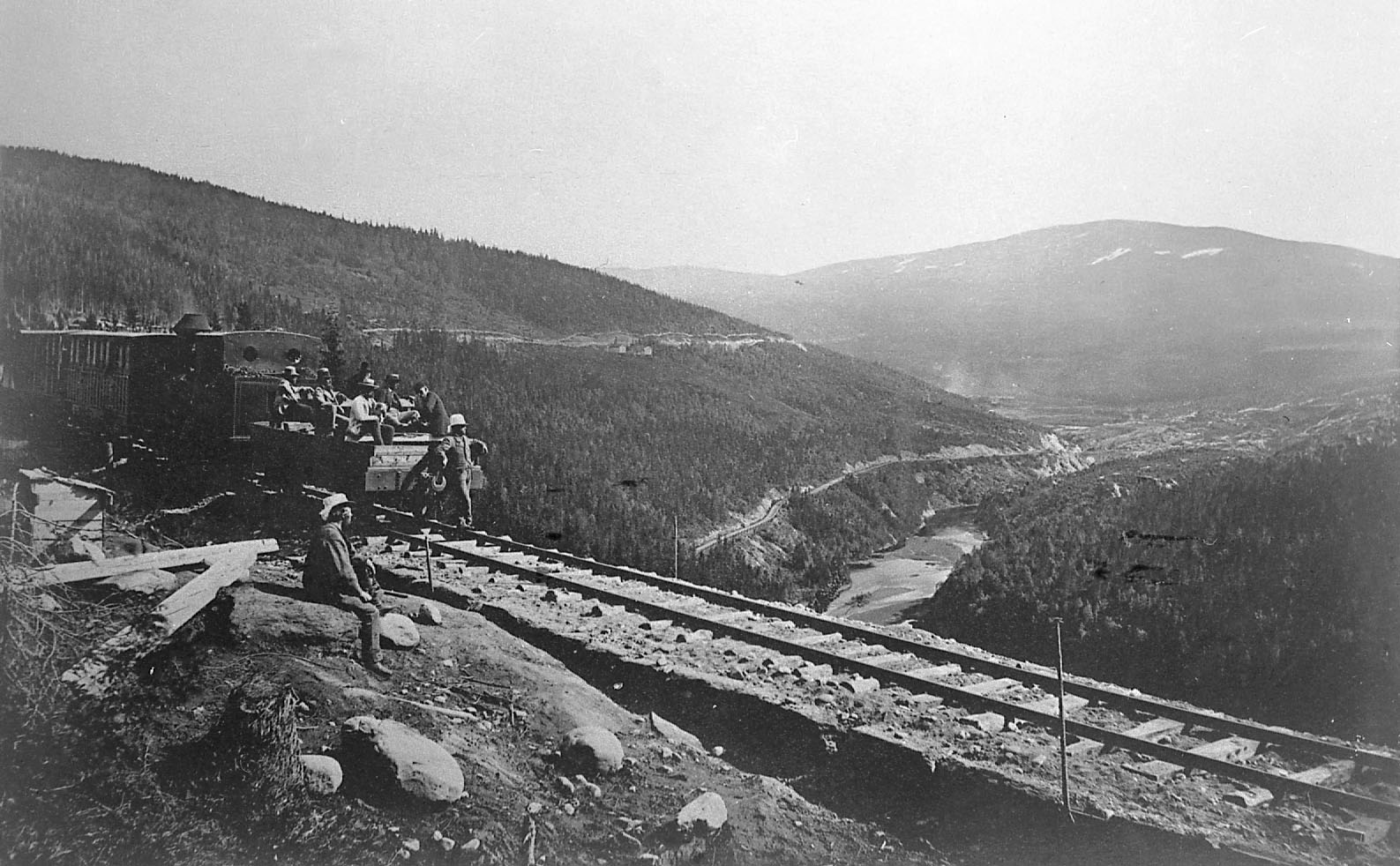
A section through Holtålen Municipality in 1877

The Meråker Line from Trondheim to Sweden opened in 1882. Built with standard gauge, it received a new station at Brattøra. The old station at Kalvskinnet and the section of track from there to Selsbakk was thereby closed and replaced with a new line to the new, common station. The Selsbakk Line opened on 24 June 1884.

Herring and other fish produce was sent to Eastern Norway from 1888, and increased dramatically throughout the 1890s. Toll barriers on exports to Sweden from 1897 shifted farm produce to be sent from Trøndelag to Eastern Norway. Hurtigruten started as a coastal steamer service on 2 July 1893, connecting Trondheim to Tromsø in 34. By sailing during the night it was possible to reduce travel time down from four to five days. The ships corresponded with the express trains in Trondheim. The timing was not well-suited for local passengers, and from 1899 NSB operated an extra express train which corresponded with Hurtigruten. NSB started local transport from Trondheim to Selsbakk and Heimdal during the summers from 15 May 1907.

=== Gauge conversion ===
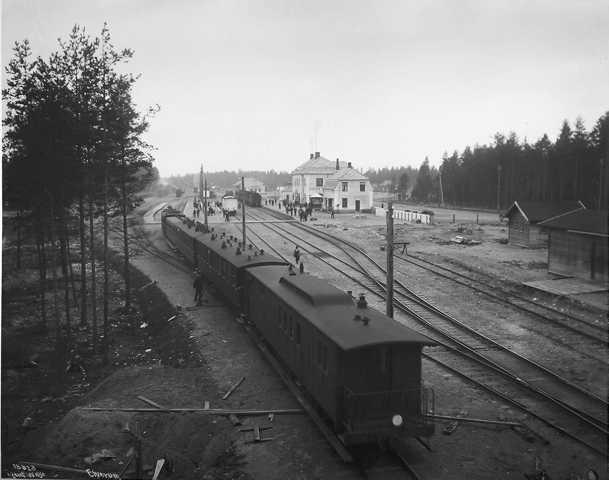
Elverum Station in 1913. The narrow-gauge train is using the narrow-gauge tracks to the left, while a standard-gauge train is waiting on the other tracks.

Hamar Station developed into a major center for the transhipment of goods between narrow and standard gauge rolling stock. In 1912, 91,725 tonnes of cargo was transshipped, all of it by hand. The people and time cost were significant. The first proposal to convert the Røros Line to standard gauge came in parliamentary discussions in 1890. The 1898 decision to build the Bergen Line to standard gauge marked the end of the narrow gauge as an acceptable standard. The Solør Line opened in 1910, connecting to the Røros Line at Elverum, resulting in both Hamar, Elverum and Trondheim having dual-gauge stations and major transhipment operations.

The first plans for conversion were developed in 1903 and eight years later the first grants were issued. The first step was establishing dual gauge from Hamar to Elverum. Work commenced in 1914 and involved elevating the track at places and moving buildings further from the line. Elverum received a new station facility in 1913. The work between Hamar and Elverum was delayed and instead the section from Elverum to Rena opened with dual gauge first, on 7 November 1917. The dual gauge was completed to Hamar on 29 November 1919. The conversion cost 1.4 million kroner, but would save NSB about 400,000 kroner per year. Twenty freight cars would be freed up. Passenger trains operating between Hamar and Elverum were standard gauge, while narrow gauge was used for through trains. Standard gauge trains, and not just freight cars, could operate to Rena from 1926.

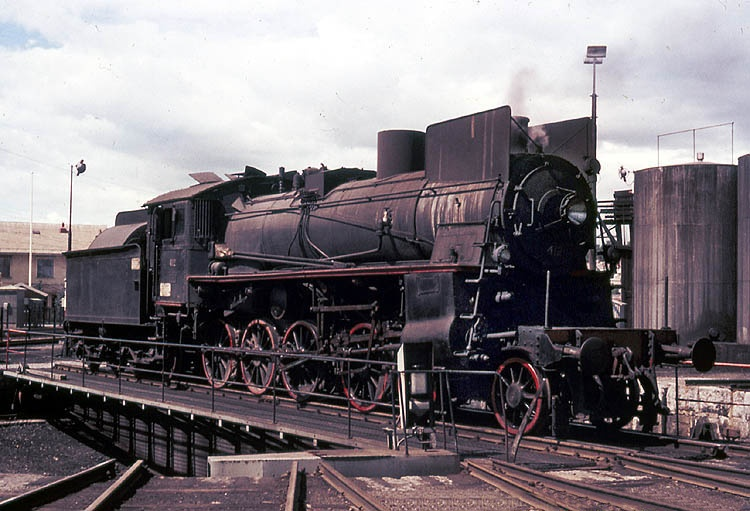
Class 26c standard-gauge steam locomotive at Hamar Station

The standard gauge line from Oslo to Hamar was extended to Otta by 1896. Parliament approved the Dovre Line in 1908, which would see this line extended across Dovrefjell to Støren and onward to Trondheim. The Dovre Line would become the new main train line from Oslo to Trondheim and relegating the Røros Line to a secondary service. Meeting in Støren, the Trondhjem–Støren Line would therefore need to be upgraded to meet the higher standard. This involved a major upgrade to Trondheim Central Station, and installing dual gauge to Støren. The latter was taken into use on 3 September 1919 and remained in place to 14 September 1921, after which it only had standard gauge operations. The section became part of the Dovre Line with its opening on 17 September.

Traffic on the line peaked in the financial year 1919–20, when the line transported 1,739,262 passengers, and in 1917–18 when 655,102 tonnes of cargo were hauled. The Røros Line was relegated with all through traffic being sent via Dovre from 1921. The line received a through service, which corresponded with express trains on the Dovre Line From 1928 Cmb Class 1 gasoline railcars were introduced on the line. This allowed a new kind of service, where the railcars would call at small halt established at road intersections. Between 1928 and 1931 there were built 26 such stops between Tynset and Støren.

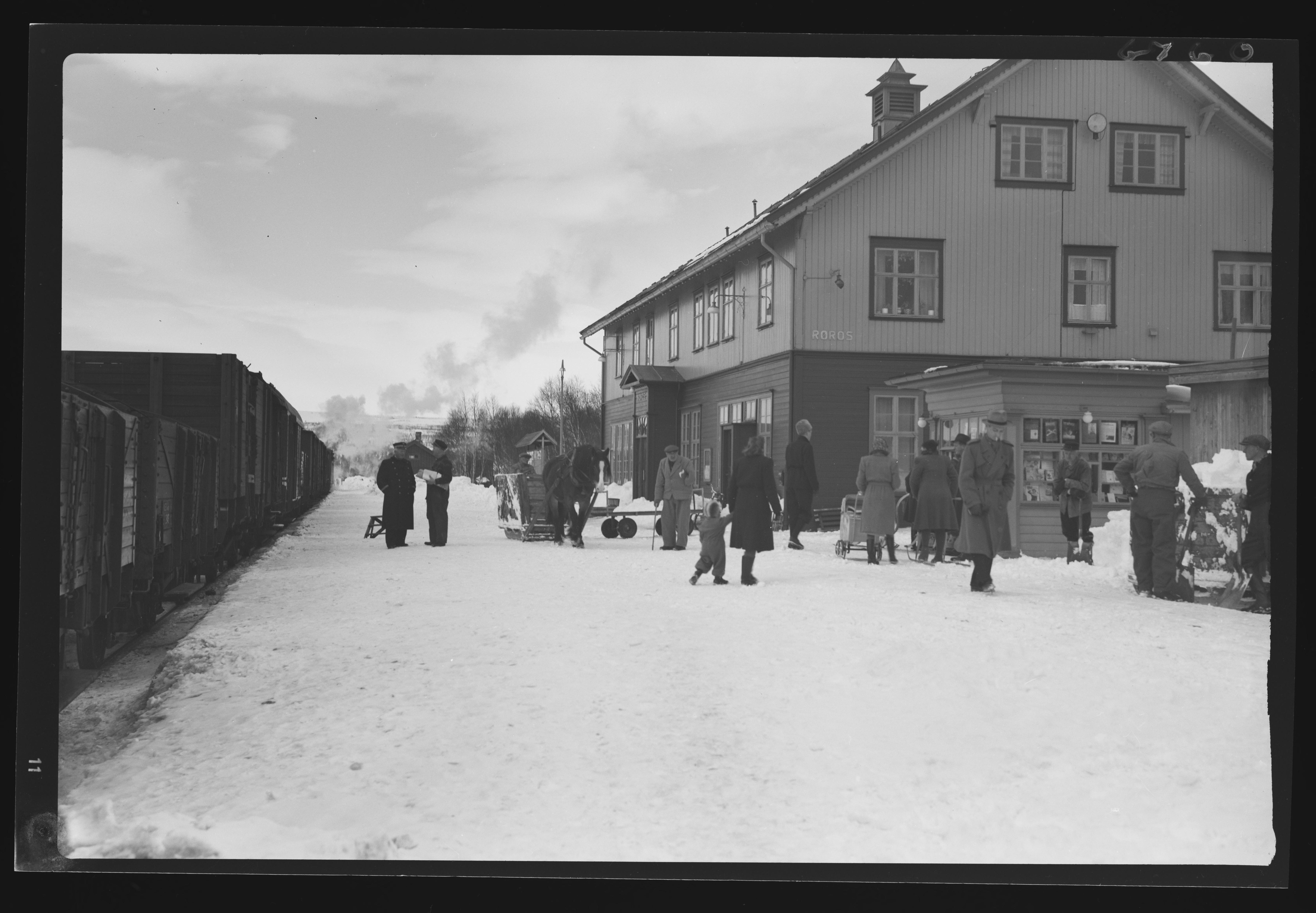
Train at Røros Station during the winter of 1949

By the 1920s it seem evident that the three remaining narrow-gauge mainlines, the Røros, Vestfold and Jæren Lines would be gauge converted. Røros Copper Works shut down production in 1926, citing high transport costs caused by transshipment at Støren as one reason. The next stage of gauge conversion took place in 1931, when the section between Rena and Koppang, which opened on 7 October. By November the dual gauge between Rena and Hamar had been removed. A unison Parliament passed legislation on 3 June 1935 to gauge convert the line. The upgrade was planned to reduce the minimum curve radius to 250 meters (820 ft). Four new tunnels were planned to bypass otherwise narrow sections, but in the end only the 1,181-meter (3,875 ft) Drøyli Tunnel was built. The other major works was to replace the branch line which Røros Station was built on with a semi-circular loop through the town. Following the German occupation in April 1940, work on converting the remaining of the line was accelerated. A major flood in Gaula started on 24 August that year, washing away parts of the line several places through Gauldalen and station at Rognes was washed away. The line was improved and placed on a new right-of-way several places. By May 1941 there were 1,723 men working on the line improvements. The conversion itself took place two stations at a time, and was completed on 3 August.

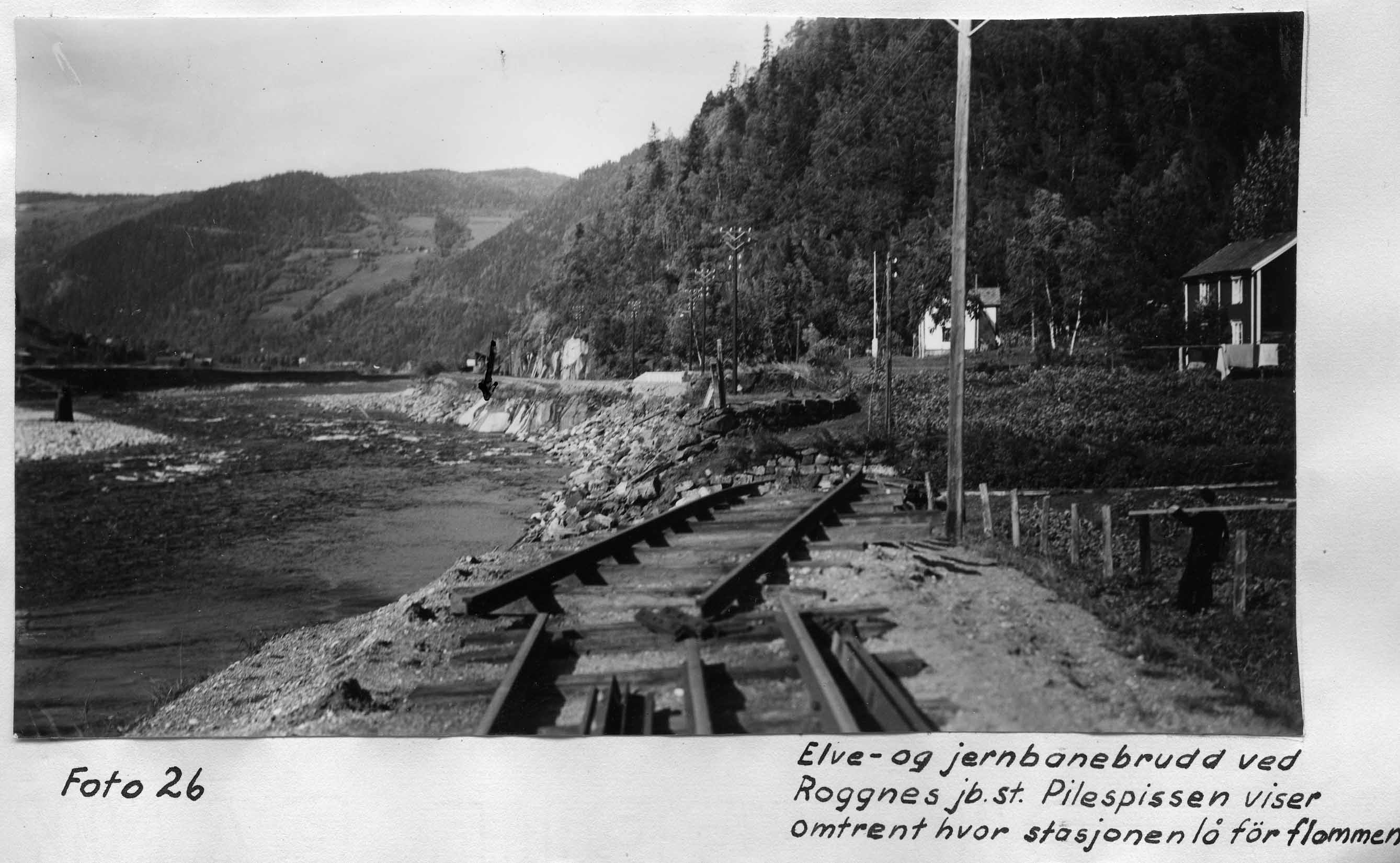
The river took away part of the line past Rognes Station in 1940

=== Standard-gauge operations ===
Throughout the Second World War the services on the line remained limited. A through express train was not reintroduced until 3 October 1949. By the following year travel time had been reduced to 15 hours between Oslo and Trondheim, following the many infrastructure improvements. The line was gradually modernized after the war. From the 1950s many of the older bridges were replaced or modernized. New 35 kilogram per meter (70 lb/ft) rails were gradually installed, allowing an axle load of 16 tonnes from 1964. Many passing loops were lengthened to the norm of 315 meters (1,033 ft). Simplified interlocking systems started being installed at stations from 1959.

Steam locomotives were from 1951 partially replaced with Class 86 diesel multiple units, cutting travel time from Hamar to Røros to six hours. The remaining locomotive-hauled trains received the stronger Class 26c engines from 1956. Several weak points on the line were upgraded in 1964, allowing the even stronger Class 30 and 31 trains to be used, as well as Di 3 diesel locomotives. Regular use of Di 3s started on 30 May 1965, coinciding with the reintroduction of night trains on the line, running all the way from Oslo to Trondheim. The express trains were from 22 May 1966 until 31 October 1970 operated with Class 88 diesel multiple units. The last revenue service with steam locomotives ran on 5 July 1968.

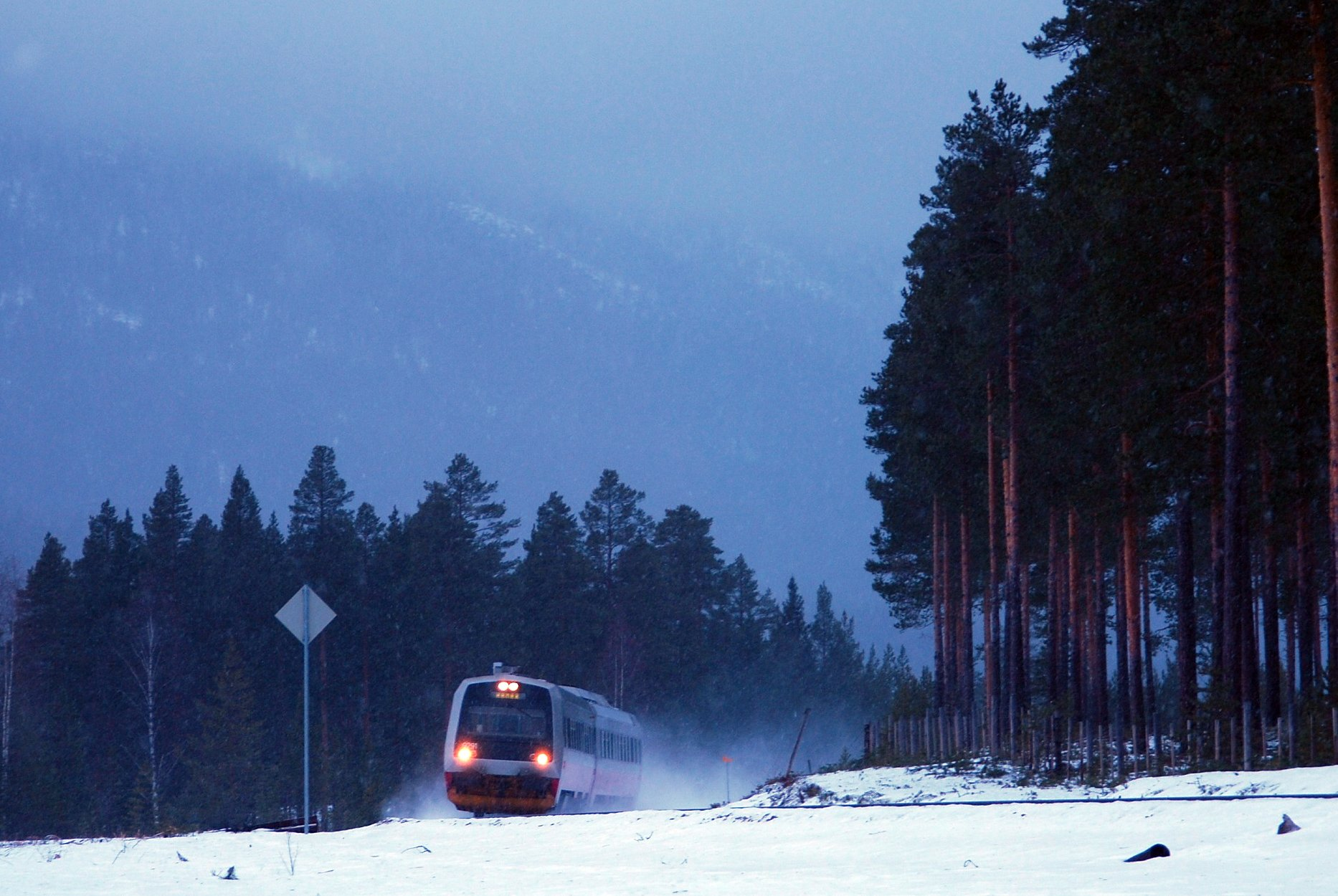
Southbound NSB Class 92 just before Atna Station

Cargo handling was reorganized in 1973, after which fewer stations handled cargo and more was transported the last kilometers by truck through Linjegods. Lumber became an increasingly important cargo from that decade, when the log floating was terminated. Throughout the 1970s and 1970s many stations became unstaffed. NSB introduced their Class 92 diesel multiple units in 1984. Combined with the closing of many smaller halts, they allowed travel time between Hamar and Røros to be cut by an hour. From 1 June 1986 all local trains running between Hamar and Elverum were terminated. Class 86 remained in irregular service until 1996. In a deal to retain passenger traffic on the Solør Line, the day and night expresses to Oslo were run via Kongsvinger instead of Hamar, until 1989 for the day trains and 1991 for the night trains. General freight trains north of Koppang were terminated from 1995. The freight service was gradually reduced and from 2002 no wagon-load cargo trains were being operated on the line.

Complete interlocking systems were installed at the larger stations between 1989 and 1993. A simplified centralized traffic control was installed between 1990 and 1994 between Hamar and Røros, operated from the central in Hamar. Unlike most other lines, this did not include automatic train stop (ATS). The rails were replaced during the 1990s with one of 49 kg/m (98 lb/ft), allowing an axle load of 22.5 tonnes. The Åsta Accident on 4 January 2000 killed 19 people when two trains collided head-on, making it the deadliest train accident in Norway since 1975. Insufficient procedures combined with the lack of ATS was found to be a contributing cause of the accident. This caused ATS to be installed and operational on the line from 30 June 2001.

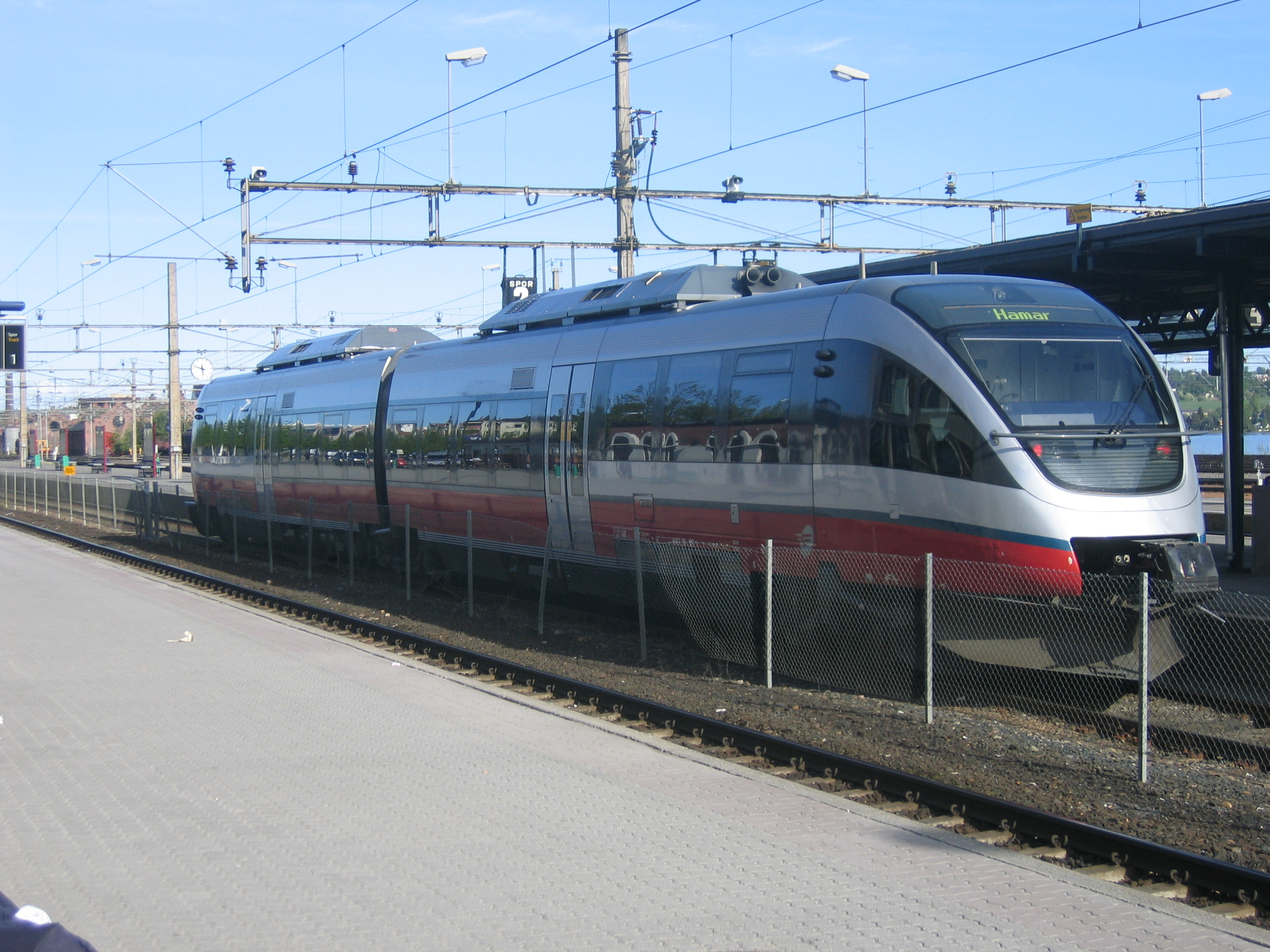
Class 93 diesel multiple unit at Hamar Station. These have been used on the Røros Line since their introduction in 2000

== Operations ==
As the Røros Line lacks electrification, all trains operating on the line use diesel traction. This means that both express passenger and freight trains between Oslo and Trondheim use the Dovre Line. The main use of the Røros Line are regional passenger trains, operated using Class 92 and Class 93 diesel multiple units operated by SJ Norge. As of 2015 there are two through trains which run from Trondheim to Hamar, with a travel time of 6 hours. There is one additional train which runs once between Trondheim and Røros, taking 2 hours and 30 minutes, and four trains which run between Røros and Hamar, taking 3 hours and 20 minutes. Large parts of the day there are therefore a two-hour headway between Hamar and Røros.

The density of forest in Hedmark along both the Solør and Røros Lines is among the most productive in the country, and these lines see an unprecedented amount of lumber trains compared to elsewhere in the country. Most cargo traffic on the line are lumber trains. These operate out of lumber terminals at Auma, Koppang, Hovdmoen and Vestmoen. Most of this traffic operates southwards, continuing onward along the Solør Line to Sweden. In 2015 there were about 40 lumber trains per week. Train operators include Hector Rail, TX Logistik and Tågåkeriet i Bergslagen. The largest customer is Stora Enso, which mostly imports the lumber for use at its plant in Karlstad, Sweden. Lesser quantities are transported to Gävle and Sundsvall. There is also one train per week with northbound to Norske Skog Skogn. In addition, there are some smaller freight trains which run from Hamar to Elverum, about ten per week. Due to the lack of electrification, no intermodal and container trains operate along the Røros Line.

== Architecture ==
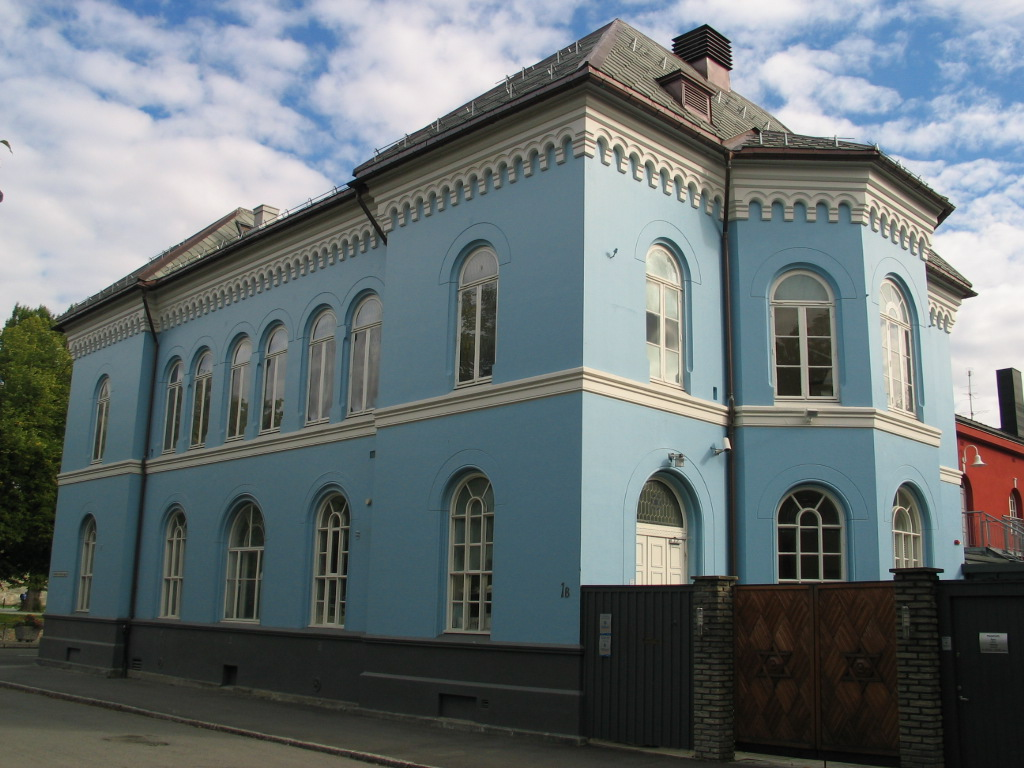
Trondhjem Kalvskinnet Station now serves as Trondheim Synagogue

The stations between Hamar and Grundset, and Trondheim and Støre were designed by Georg Andreas Bull as his railway-architectural debut. They were designed in Swiss chalet style, all in wood. Compared to the contemporary Trunk and Kongsvinger Lines, the narrow gauge railways were to be low-cost projects, which included scaling down the size of stations. The stations in the south were somewhat more decorated. On the northern line the stations were made even smaller. Few of these stations remain. Hamar received a new station designed by Balthazar Lange in 1880, and again by Paul Due in historicism in 1897. The only original stone station was Throndhjem Kalvskinnet. Elverum Station is also in stone, but with a less marked style than many other of Due's stations.

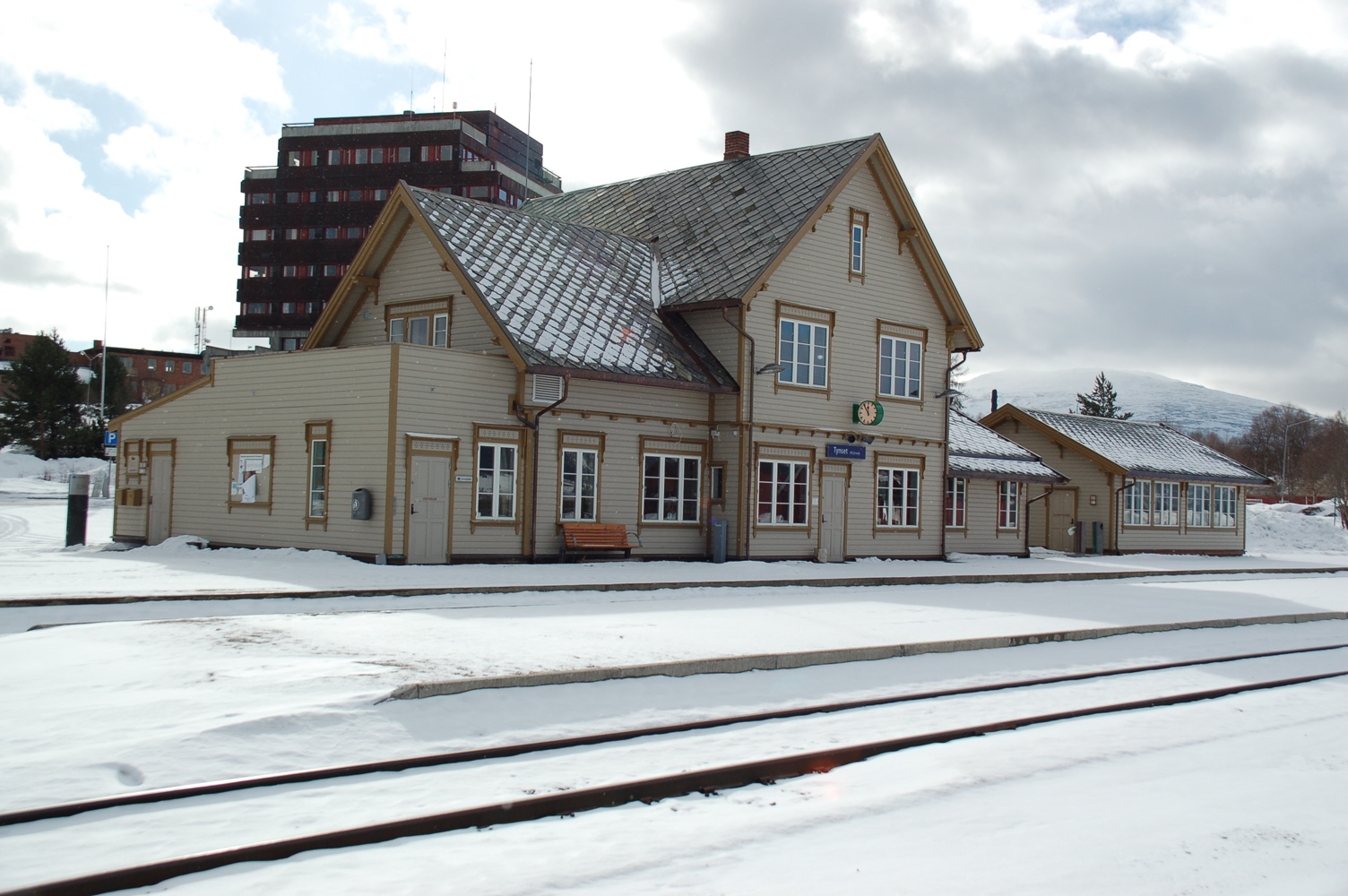
Tynset Station stands in contrast with the postmodern town hall.

Between Grundset and Støren the spending on stations increased, as it became evident that the railway would be connecting two regions together. Stations were designed both by Bull and Peter Andreas Blix. The architecture drew more from national inspiration, with Bull creating simple, often rectangular structures and Blix designing more creative stations. The line had relatively many small guard houses, although few of these have been preserved. On the other hand, few of the station buildings were expanded and are therefore largely intact from the time of construction. Five stations were replaced between 1935 and 1964 due to fires or other causes.

== Future ==
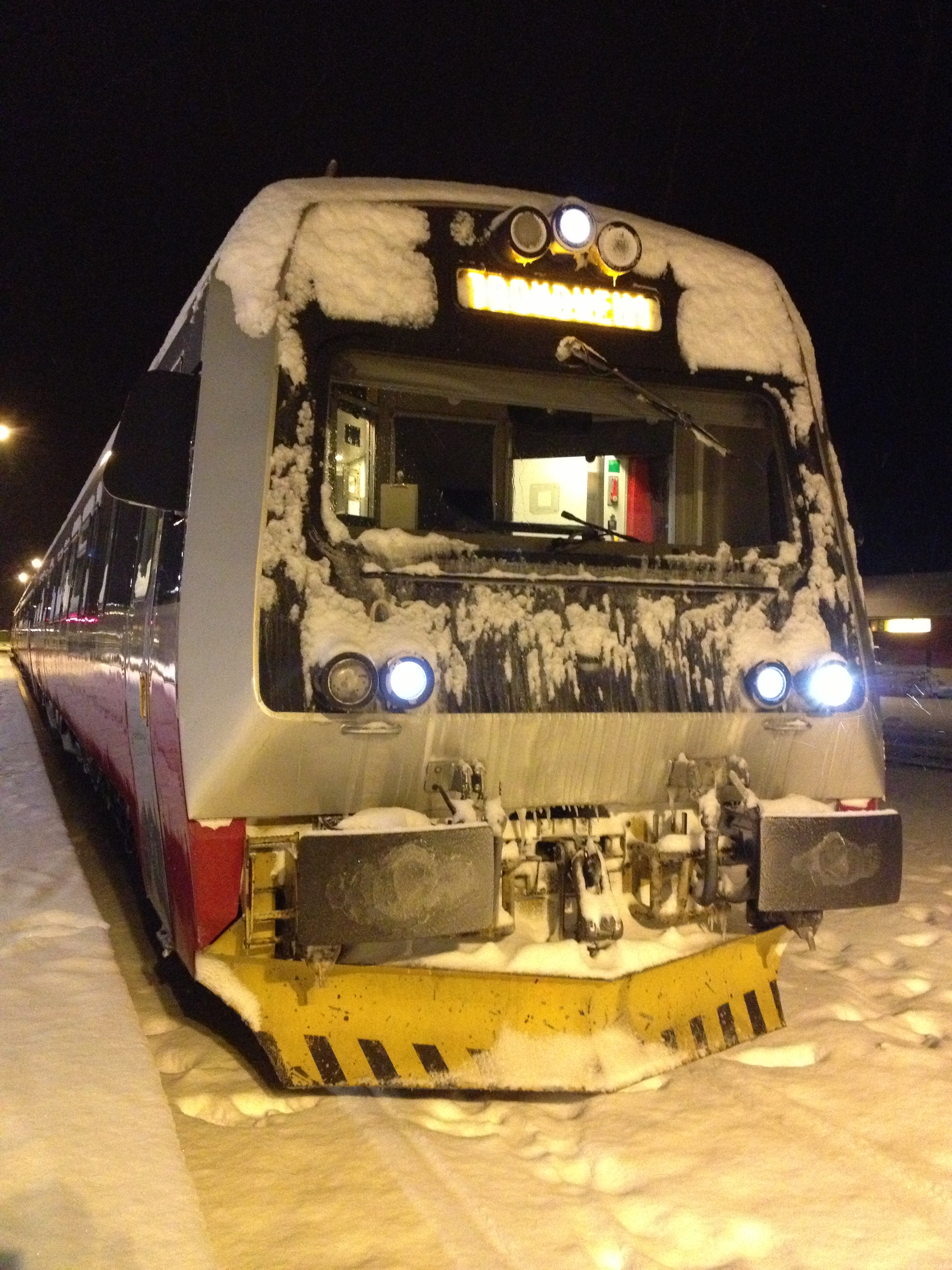
A chilly start for a NSB Class 92 at Røros Station on 2 January 2013.

Two major developments have been proposed for the Røros Line – electrification and installation of centralized traffic control. The latter is scheduled to take place as part of nationwide implementation of European Train Control System, which is scheduled to be completed within 2021. The National Rail Administration is considering the possibilities of electrifying the Røros Line along with all its other diesel lines. If a go-head were given, it would probably be in conjunction with the electrification of the Solør Line. A 2015 report recommended that the Røros and Solør Lines be given priority after the Nordland Line from Trondheim to Steinkjer Station and the Meråker Line, but before the rest of the Nordland Line and the Rauma Line.

The primary impact of electrification would be a severe cut in operating costs of the railway companies, and thus better margins for forest owners, who could increase their export. A secondary impact would allow the Rorøs Line to also handle intermodal transport. Cargo trains could run directly from Gothenburg to Trondheim Station, via the Norway/Vänern, Värmland, Solør and Røros Lines, bypassing the congested cargo lines through Oslo. Intermodal cargo trains operate from Oslo to Trondheim via the Dovre Line, despite its higher elevation, because of the electric traction.

If the Solør and Røros Lines were electrified, they could act as a reserve for the Dovre Line. This is hardly possible today because the train companies lack diesel locomotives. Further traffic increase could be handled through operating northbound trains along the Solør/Røros Line and southbound via the Dovre Line. Need for this reserve is shown by the heavy rainfalls of storm Hans in early August 2023, leading to a bridge collapse on the Dovre line. Temporarily service between Oslo and Trondheim was diverted via the Røros Line, until multiple landslides caused by further rainfalls also led to suspended service on this line, leaving Trondheim and Oslo without rail connection as of 22. August 2023. The Røros line was reopened for traffic about a week later, reenabling train traffic between Oslo and Trondheim, and on 20 May 2024 the last part of the Dovre line reopened.

== Driver’s cab documentation ==
Several full-length cab rides on the Røros Line have been recorded by working locomotive engineers, showing gradients, forests and typical inland winter conditions. Here is a complete overview of the line from Trondheim to Røros:

== Bibliography ==
- Bjerke, Thor; Stenersen, Roar (2004). Rørosbaneboka (in Norwegian). Hamar: Norwegian Railway Museum / Norwegian Railway Club. ISBN 82-90286-24-4.
- Bjerke, Thor; Holom, Finn (2004). Banedata 2004 (in Norwegian). Hamar / Oslo: Norwegian Railway Museum / Norwegian Railway Club. ISBN 82-90286-28-7.
- Civitas (2012). Utvikling av Røros-og Solørbanen (PDF). Oslo: Civitas. Archived from the original on 17 June 2015.
- Gillebo, Rolf; Lein, Kristian (2002). Utvikling av Rørosbanen – rammebetingelser og betydning (PDF). Lillehammer: Østlandsforskning. ISBN 82-7356-516-5. ISSN 0809-1617. Archived (PDF) from the original on 17 June 2015.
- Hartmann, Eivind; Mangset, Øistein; Reisegg, Øyvind (1997). Neste stasjon (in Norwegian). Oslo: Gyldendal Norsk Forlag. ISBN 82-05-25294-7.
- Østvedt, Einar (1954). De norske jernbaners historie (in Norwegian). Vol. 1. Oslo: Norwegian State Railways.
