= Rena Station =

Railway station in Åmot, Norway

Rena
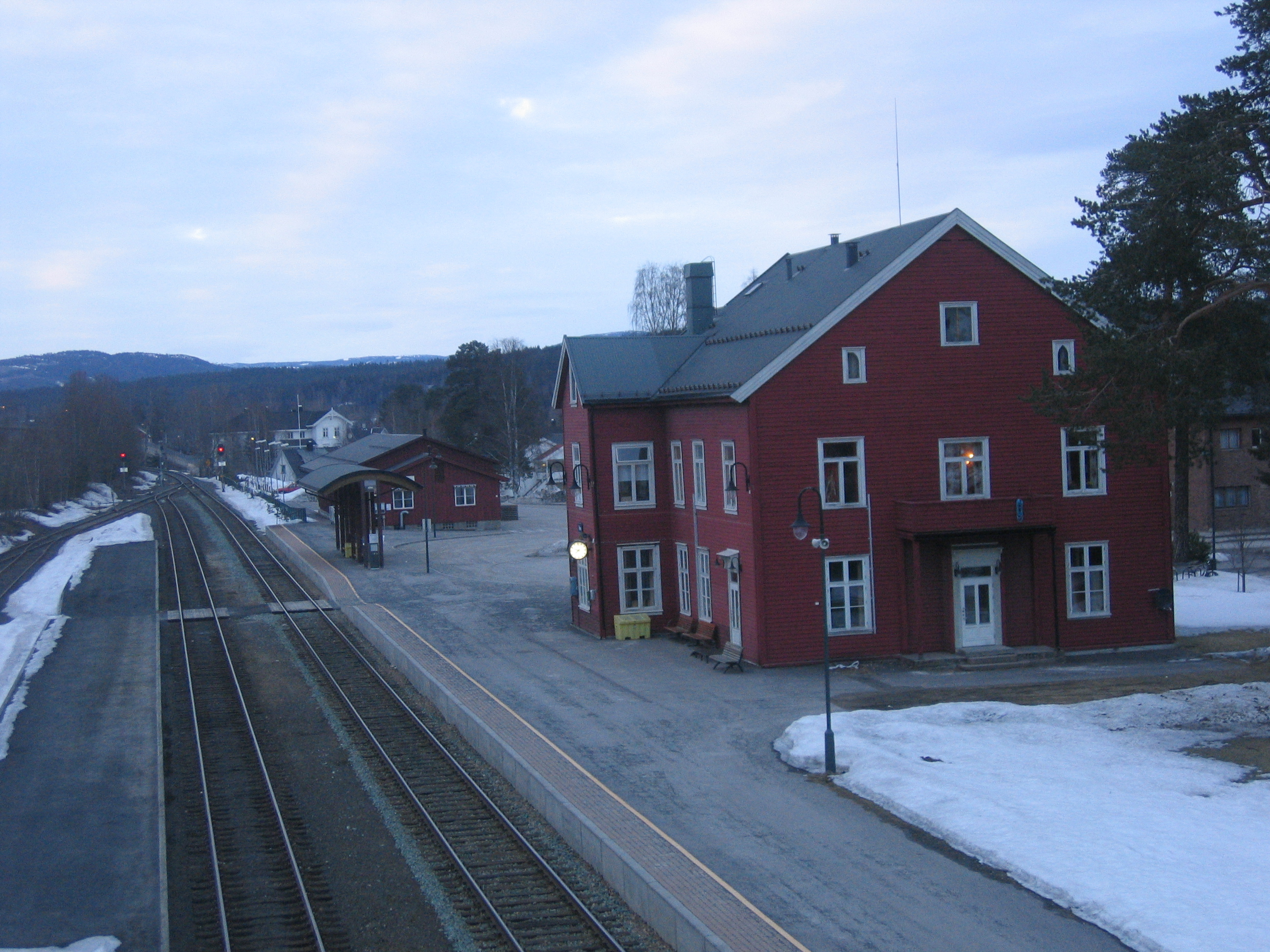

General information
- Location: Rena, Åmot Municipality; Norway
- Coordinates: 62.574°N 11.3791°E
- Elevation: 224.5 m (737 ft) amsl
- Owner: Bane NOR
- Operator: SJ Norge
- Line: Røros Line
- Distance: 190.38 km (118.30 mi)
- Platforms: 2

History
- Opened: 1871
Location

Rena Station (Norwegian: Rena stasjon) is a railway station located in Rena, Norway on the Røros Line. It is located 190.38 kilometers (118.30 mi) from Oslo Central Station at 224.5 meters (737 ft) above mean sea level. Services are provided by SJ Norge to Røros and Hamar. The station opened in 1871.

The station restaurant was taken over by Norsk Spisevognselskap on 1 October 1925 and was operated by the company until 31 December 1926.

Preceding station			Following station
Steinvik	Røros Line		Rudstad
Preceding station	Regional trains		Following station
Steinvik	R60	Hamar–Røros	Rudstad
