= Public Transportation Authority in Jämtland County =

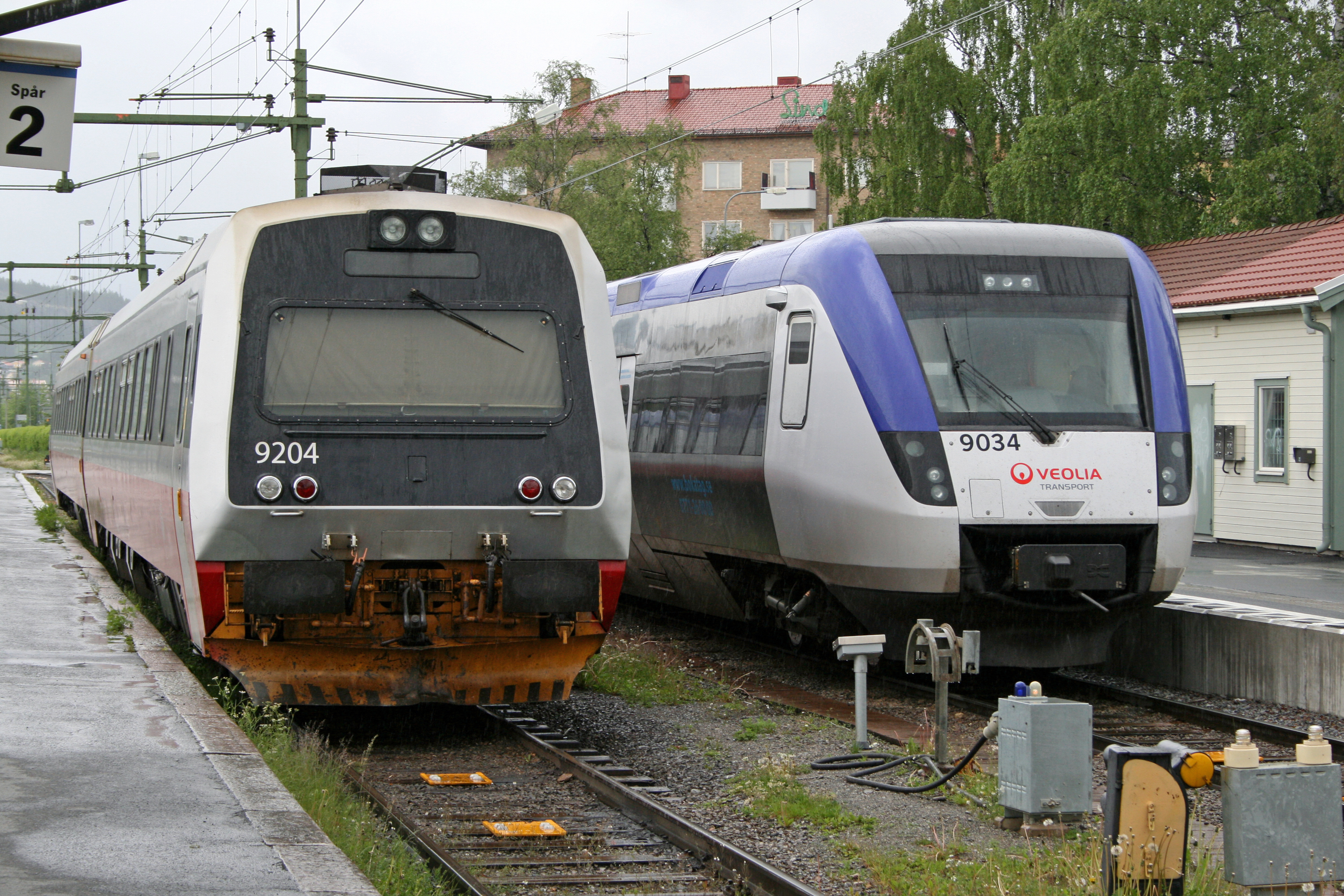
An NSB Class 93 and Regina train

The Public Transportation Authority in Jämtland County (Swedish: Länstrafiken i Jämtlands län) is the public transport authority of Jämtland County, Sweden. It is owned 50% by the county administration and 50% by the municipalities. In addition to buses and coaches, the authority is jointly responsible for regional train service Mittnabotåget that operates between Trondheim Central Station in Norway, via Östersund Central Station to Sundsvall Central Station.
