= Mittnabotåget =

Train service in Norway and Sweden

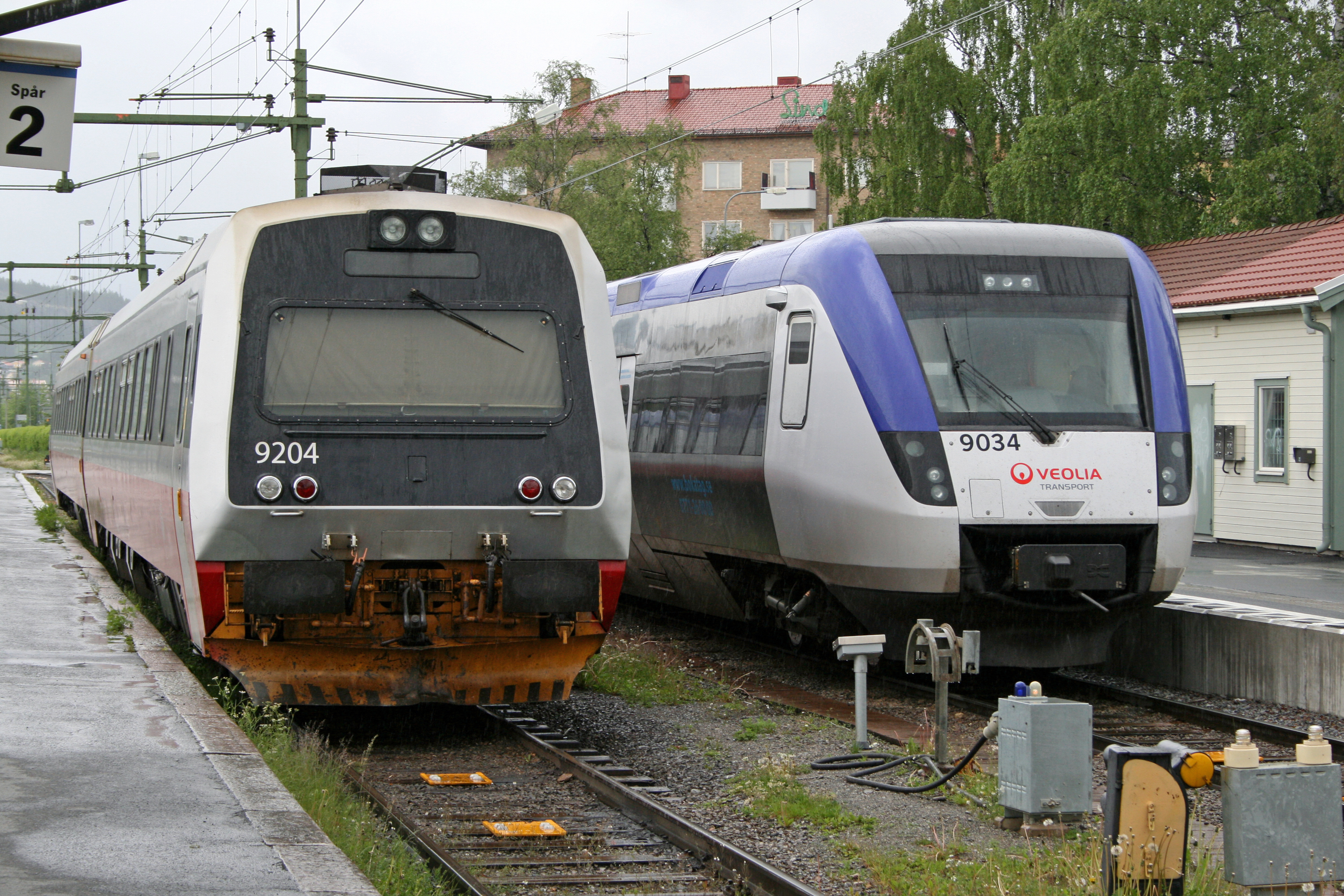
Passengers change between Norwegian (left) and Swedish trains in Östersund.

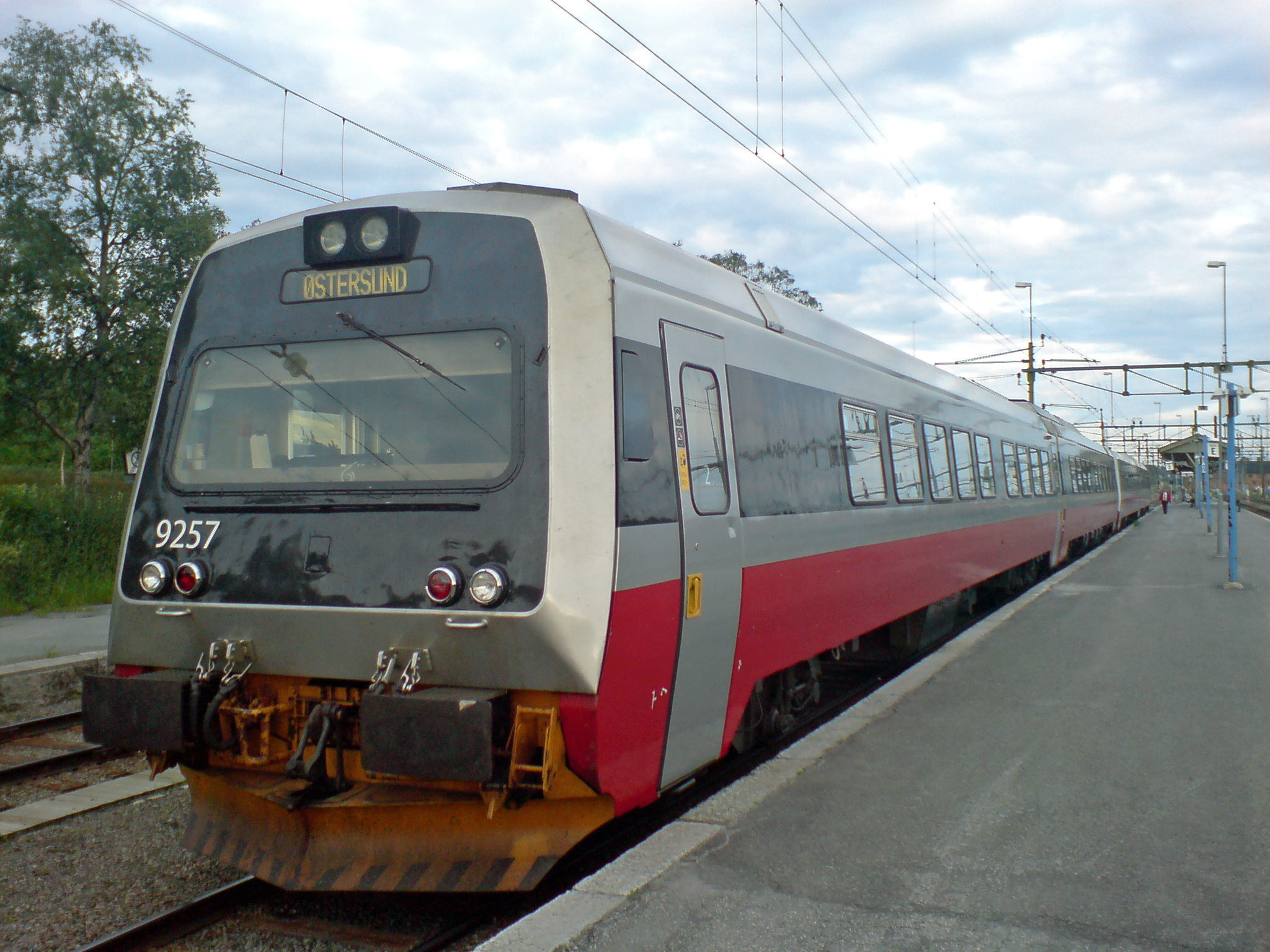
Norwegian BM92 units run the western part of the service.

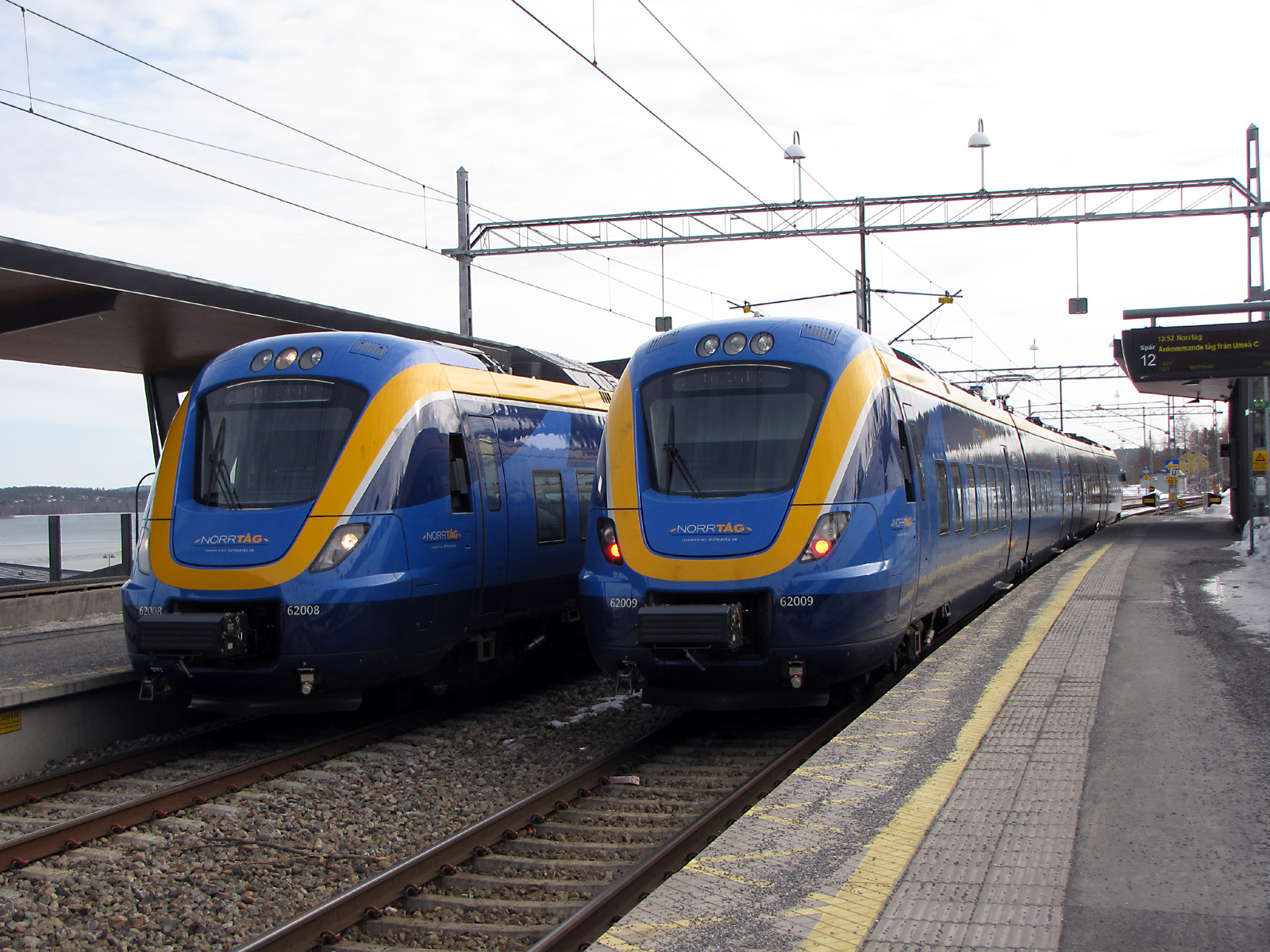
Swedish X62 trains carry passengers between Sundsvall and Östersund.

Mittnabotåget was a regional train service connecting Trondheim in Norway with Sundsvall in Sweden. It includes trains operated by Veolia Transport on the Mittlinjen between Sundsvall and Östersund in Sweden, and Norges Statsbaner’s cross-border Nabotåget services from Östersund on to Trondheim in Norway.

The line between Trondheim and Östersund operates using BM92 diesel multiple units, with two daily departures each way. The line operated by Veolia in Sweden uses electrical Regina units. In Östersund and Sundsvall, connections are available onwards towards Gävle and Stockholm by local trains and X 2000 expresses.

Mittnabotåget was partially financed through funds from the European Union (and Norway, since Norway, being outside the EU but in the EEA, must pay the EU expenses for regional development for Norway).

In autumn 2012 there was a change. The regional transit authority Norrtåg took over the responsibility from the Swedish state. This concerned the trains on the Swedish line Storlien – Sundsvall. The operator changed to Botniatåg, and from that time the X62 trains that Norrtåg owns are used. The trains between Storlien and Trondheim are still the BM92 operated by NSB. The name Mittnabotåget was discarded, and instead Norrtåg and NSB is used.
