= Ronglan Station =

Railway station in Levanger, Norway

Ronglan Station Ronglan stasjon
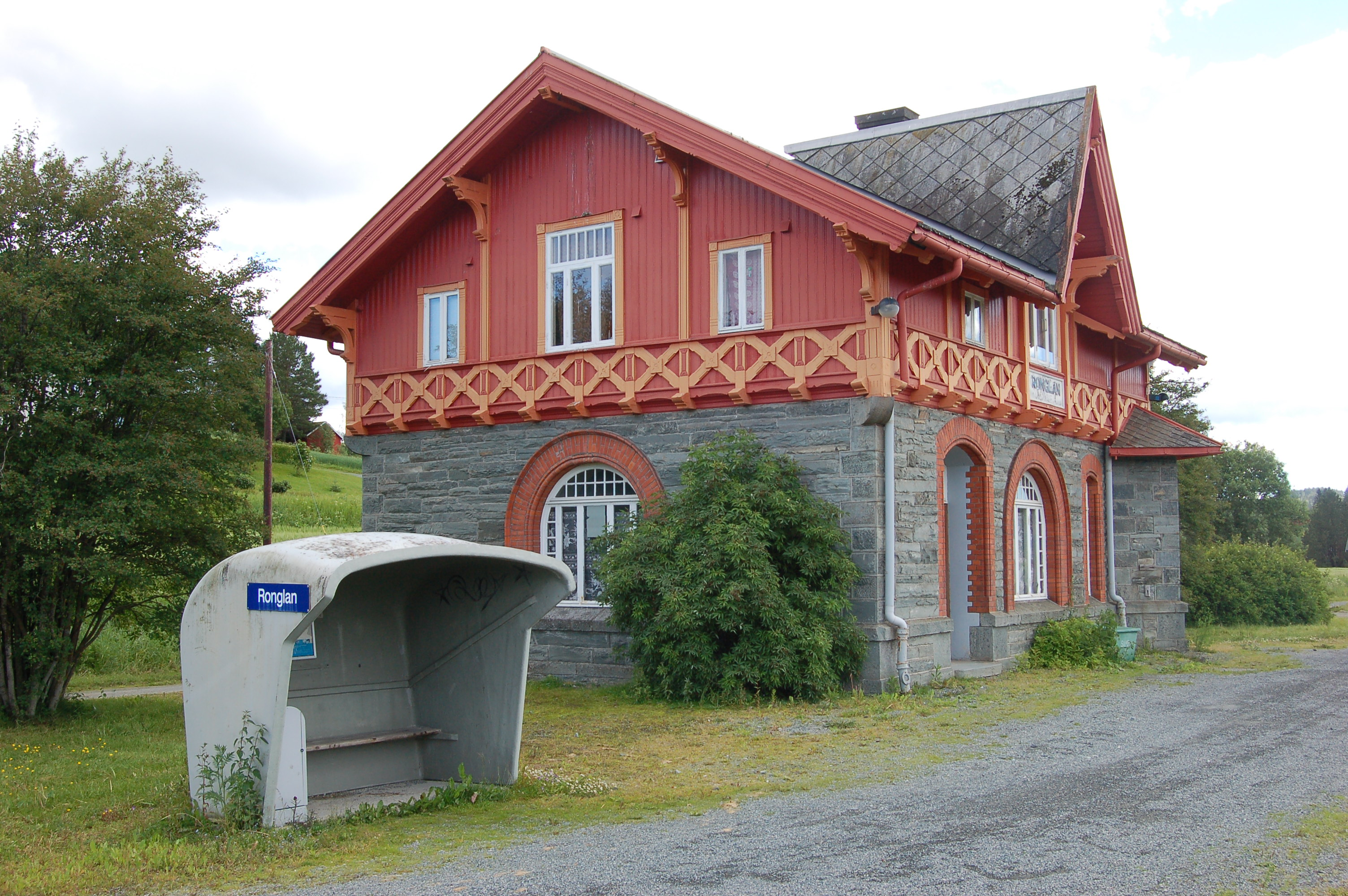
- View of the station

General information
- Location: Ronglan, Levanger Municipality; Trøndelag; Norway
- Coordinates: 63.666313°N 11.113006°E
- Elevation: 61.64 metres (202.2 ft) above sea level
- System: Railway station
- Owner: Bane NOR
- Operator: SJ Norge
- Line: Nordlandsbanen
- Distance: 69.65 kilometres (43.28 mi)
- Connections: Bus: AtB

Construction
- Architect: Paul Due

History
- Opened: 29 October 1902
Location
- Location within Trøndelag Location within Norway

Ronglan Station (Norwegian: Ronglan stasjon) is a railway station located in the village of Ronglan in Levanger Municipality in Trøndelag county, Norway. It is located on the Nordland Line. The station is served irregularly by the Trøndelag Commuter Rail service to Steinkjer and Trondheim, with several services not stopping at Ronglan. The service is operated by SJ Norge.

== History ==
The station was opened on 29 October 1902 on the Hell–Sunnan Line between Hell Station and Levanger Station as the section to Levanger was finished. It is located near the intersection of the highway from Rongland to Ekne, near European route E6. The station was designed by Paul Due and was built with a surrounding park.

Preceding station		Following station
Åsen; Hammerberg	Nordland Line	Skogn
Preceding station	Local trains	Following station
Åsen	Trøndelag Commuter Rail	Skogn
