= Brumunddal Station =

Railway station in Ringsaker, Norway

Brumunddal
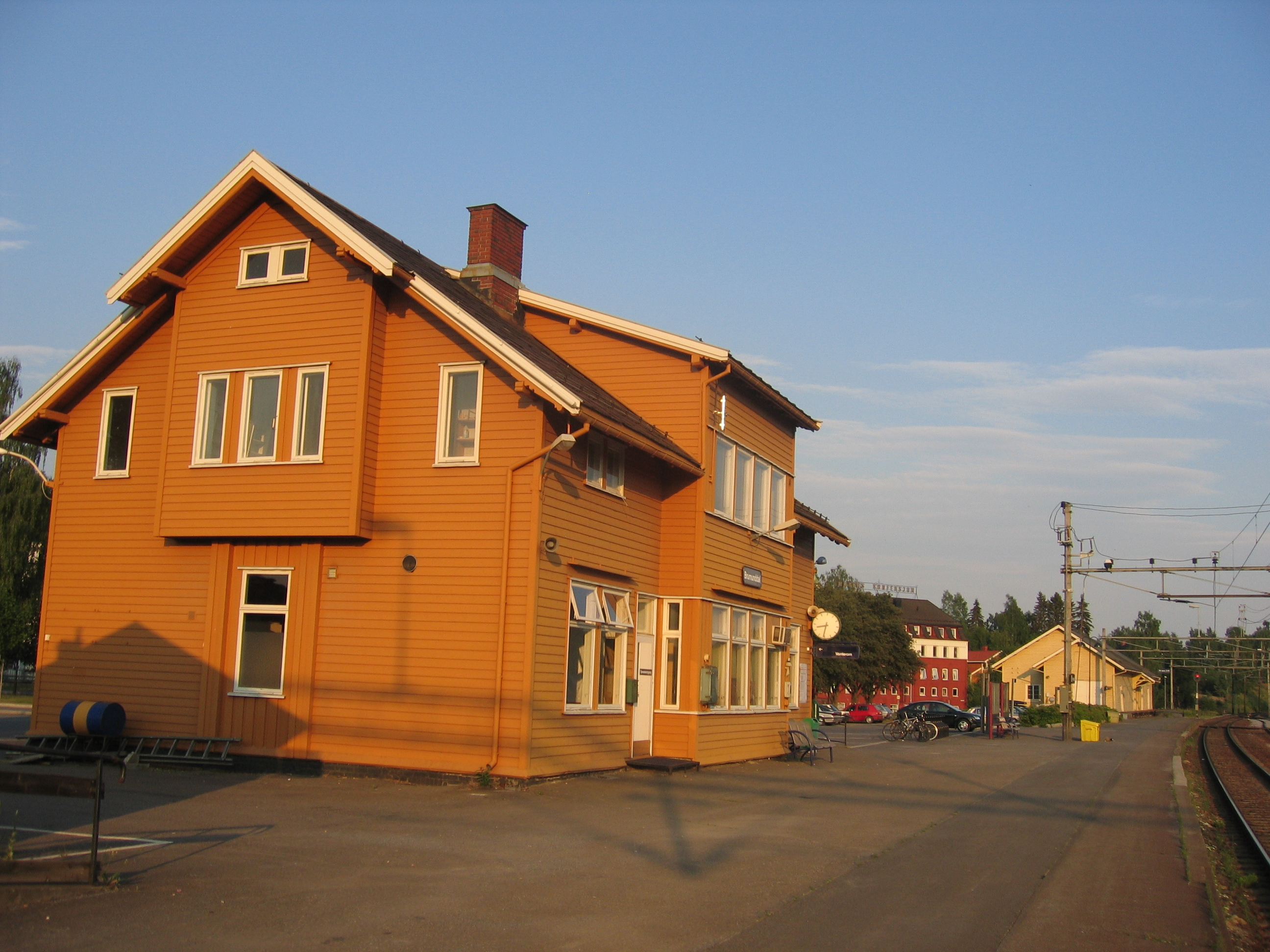

General information
- Location: Brumunddal, Ringsaker Municipality; Norway
- Coordinates: 60°52′50″N 10°56′16″E
- Elevation: 147.3 m (483 ft)
- Owner: Bane NOR
- Operator: SJ Norge, Vy
- Line: Dovre Line
- Distance: 139.90 km (86.93 mi)
- Platforms: 2
- Connections: Bus: Innlandstrafikk

History
- Opened: 1894
Location

Brumunddal Station is a railway station on Dovrebanen in the town of Brumunddal in Ringsaker Municipality, Norway. The station was opened in 1894 with the construction of the railway between Hamar and Tretten. Brumunddal is only served by regional trains by Vy and night trains by SJ Norge.

Preceding station			Following station
Hamar	Dovre Line		Moelv
Preceding station	Regional trains		Following station
Hamar	RE10	Drammen–Oslo S–Lillehammer	Moelv
