= Sykehuset Levanger Station =

Former railway station in Levanger, Norway

Sykehuset Levanger Station Sykehuset Levanger stasjon
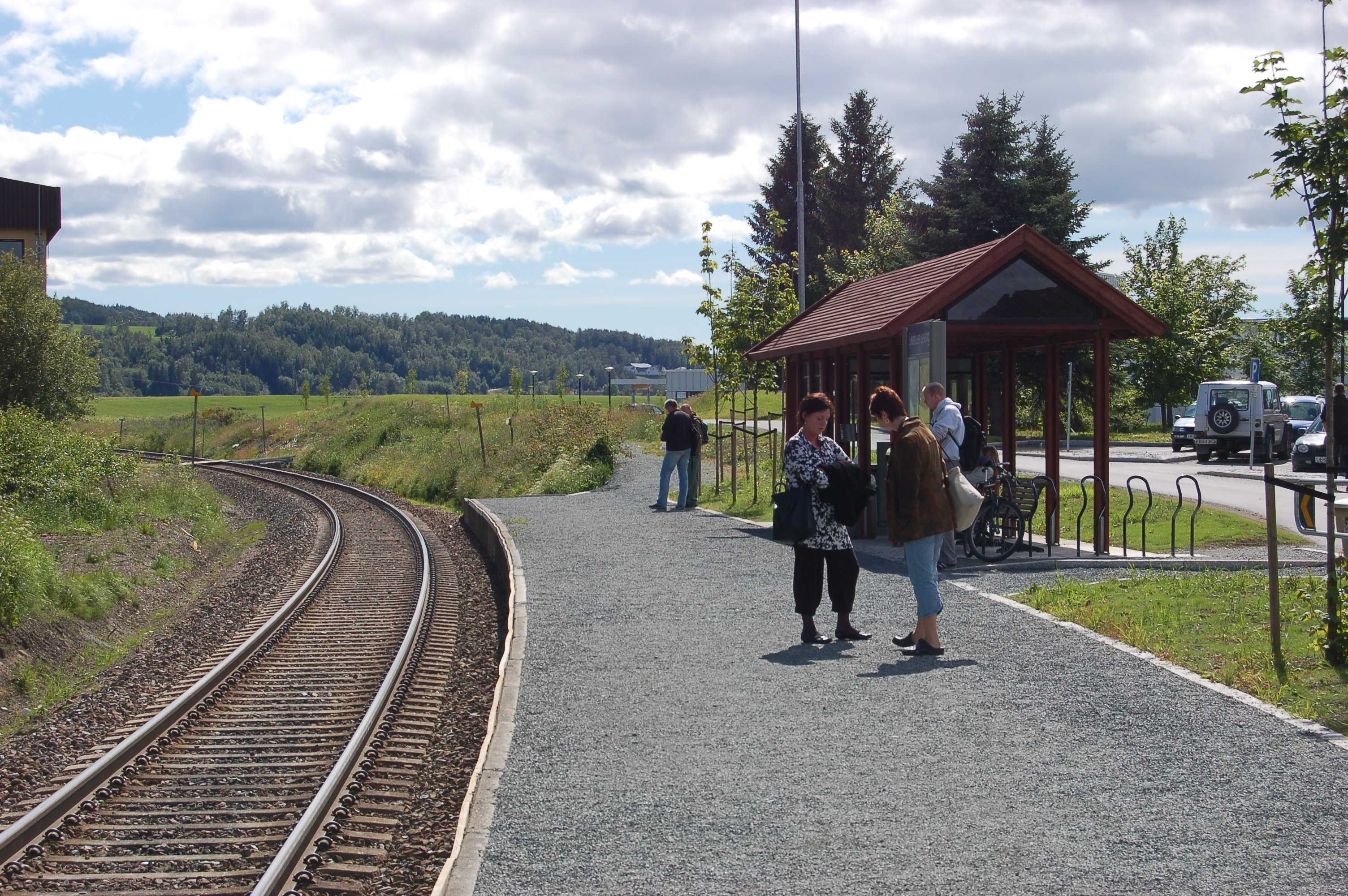
- View of the station

General information
- Location: Levanger, Levanger Municipality; Trøndelag; Norway
- Coordinates: 63°44′27″N 11°17′33″E
- System: Railway station
- Owner: Bane NOR
- Line: Nordlandsbanen
- Distance: 83.30 km (51.76 mi)

History
- Opened: 20 December 1995
- Closed: 11 December 2010
Location
- Location within Trøndelag Location within Norway

Sykehuset Levanger Station (Norwegian: Sykehuset Levanger holdeplass), previously Innherred Sykehus Station (Innherred sykehus holdeplass), was a railway station located in the town of Levanger in Levanger Municipality in Trøndelag county, Norway. It was located on the Nordland Line. The station was located adjacent to Levanger Hospital (Sykehuset Levanger). The station was served hourly by the Trøndelag Commuter Rail service operated by the Norwegian State Railways between Steinkjer and Trondheim using Class 92 trains. Until it closed on 11 December 2010, it was among the most used stations of the commuter rail.

== Facilities ==
The station was located on the Nordland Line in the southern part of the town of Levanger, adjacent to Levanger Hospital. The hospital is among the largest workplaces in the county, which also has a high degree of commuters from other towns and villages along the line. The station also generates riderships from patients and is located closer to one of the campuses of Levanger Upper Secondary School. The station had an annual ridership of between 80,000 and 90,000. The station had a single platform, a small shed, and bicycle parking. The station was unstaffed and lacked ticket machines.

== Service ==
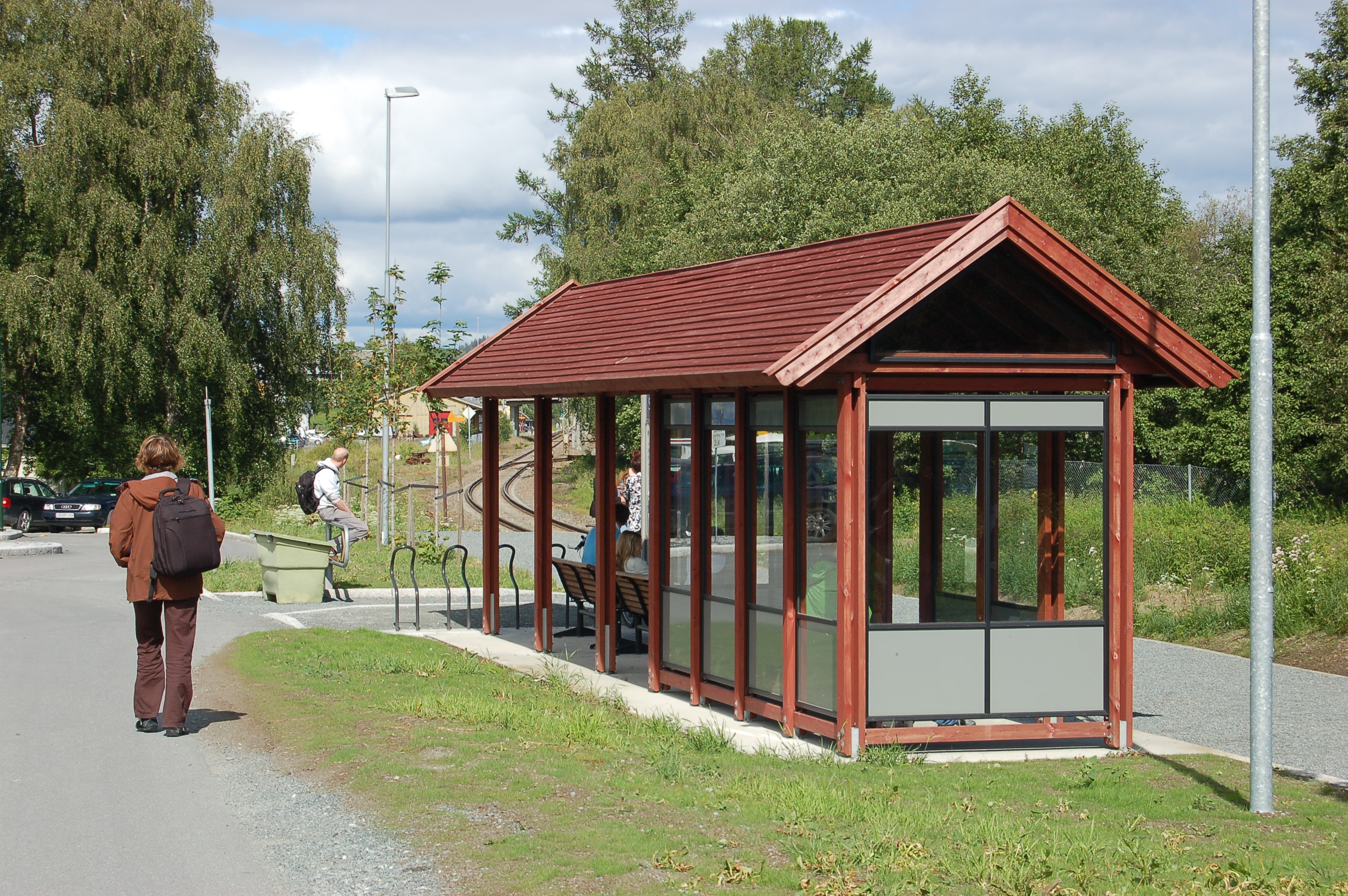
The shed at the station

The station was served once per hour by the Trøndelag Commuter Rail, which is operated by the Norwegian State Railways using Class 92 diesel multiple units. There was reduced service on weekends and late evenings, and additional services during rush hour. Travel time from Sykehuset Levanger was 38 minutes to Steinkjer Station, 1 hour and 27 minutes to Trondheim Central Station and 1 hour and 40 minutes to Lerkendal Station. The trains also stopped at Marienborg Station in Trondheim which serves St. Olavs University Hospital.

== Closing ==
The station was located only 600 metres (2,000 ft) from Levanger Station and within the same main signal. Combined with the station being on a curve, the Norwegian Railway Inspectorate in 2009 required that the station be closed. The Norwegian National Rail Administration closed the station on 11 December 2010. As compensation, a new pedestrian and bicycle path was constructed from Levanger Station to the hospital. Nord-Trøndelag County Municipality is considering re-routing one of the city buses to run from the station to the hospital, and perhaps having a free transfer service. Both NSB, National Rail Rail Administration, and Nord-Trøndelag Hospital Trust, which runs the hospital, have stated that they are not willing to finance the shuttle bus service and as it is a county affair.

Preceding station		Following station
Skogn	Nordland Line	Levanger
