= Skogn (disambiguation) =

Skogn may refer to:

== Places ==
- Skogn, a village in Levanger Municipality in Trøndelag county, Norway
- Skogn Municipality, a former municipality (1838-1962) in the old Nord-Trøndelag county, Norway
- Skogn Station, a railway station in Levanger Municipality in Trøndelag county, Norway
- Skogn Folk High School, a Norwegian folk high school in Levanger Municipality in Trøndelag county, Norway

== Other ==
- Skogn IL, a sports association in Levanger Municipality in Trøndelag county, Norway
