= Hammartun Lower Secondary School =

Location
- Lillehammer, Innladet; Norway
- Coordinates: 61°06′45″N 10°27′46″E

Information
- Enrolment: 489
- Campus: Urban
- Website: https://www.lillehammer.kommune.no/hammartun-skole.458163.no.html

Hammartun Lower Secondary School (Norwegian: Hammartun ungdomsskole) is a public lower secondary school situated in Lillehammer, Norway. The school educates around 489 students aged 13–16.

The school started teaching in 1841. The buildings it occupies today were built in 1846 and later added to.

It is situated very close to the center of Lillehammer, approximately 40 meters from the train station.
