= Moelv Station =

Railway station in Ringsaker, Norway

Coordinates: 60°55′45″N 10°41′58″E

Moelv
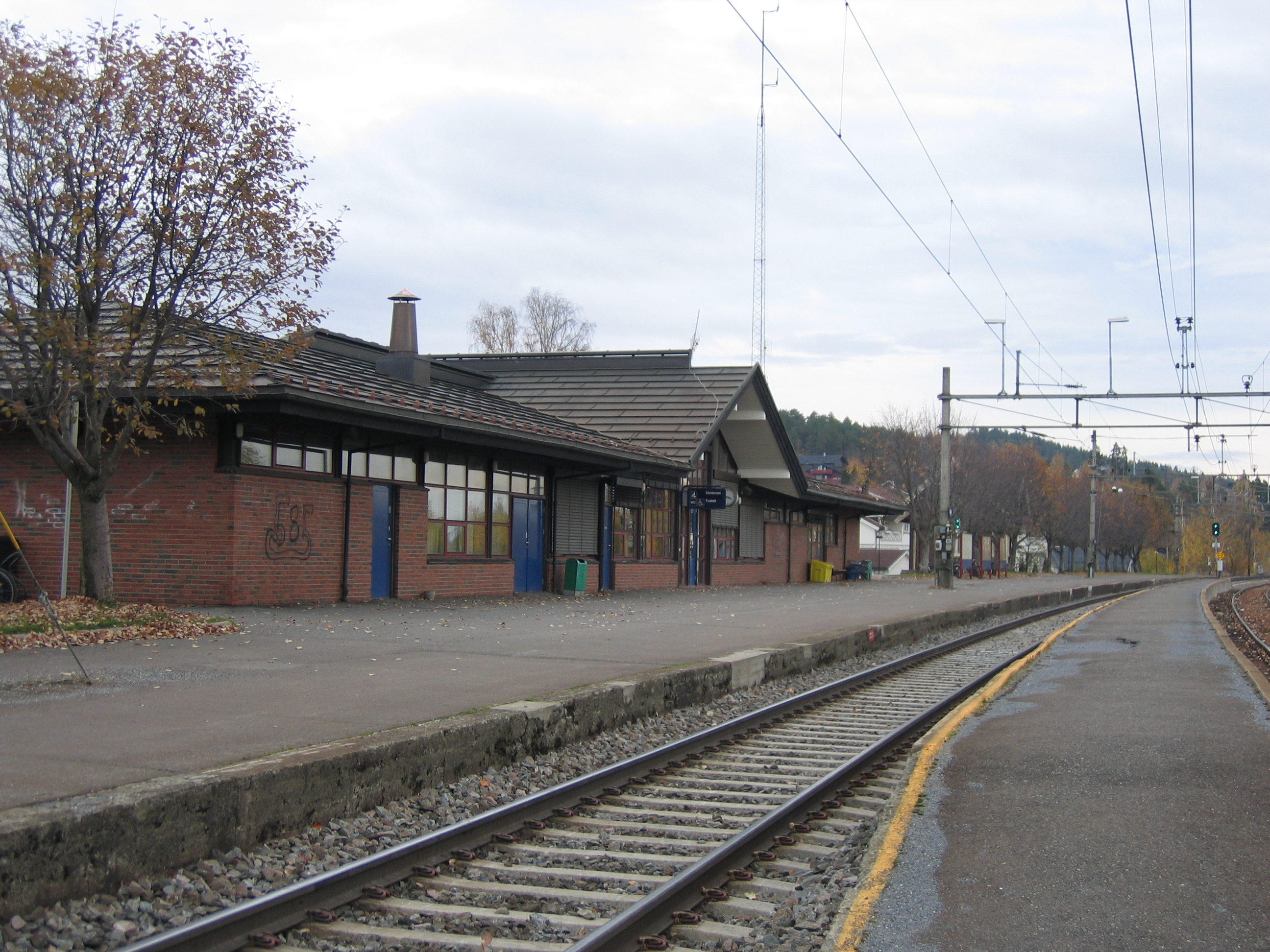

General information
- Location: Moelv, Ringsaker Municipality; Norway
- Elevation: 147.3 m (483 ft)
- Owner: Bane NOR
- Operator: SJ Norge, Vy
- Line: Dovre Line
- Distance: 155.95 km (96.90 mi)
- Platforms: 2
- Connections: Bus: Innlandstrafikk

History
- Opened: 1894
Location

Moelv Station (Norwegian: Moelv stasjon) is a railway station on the Dovre Line located in the town of Moelv in Ringsaker Municipality, Norway. Moelv is only served by regional trains by Vy and night trains by SJ Norge.

== History ==
The station was opened in 1894 with the construction of the railway between Hamar and Tretten. The first station building was finished by 1894, with design by Paul Due. It was demolished in 1981 to be replaced by a new building, which was designed by Arne Henriksen.

Preceding station			Following station
Brumunddal	Dovre Line		Lillehammer
Preceding station	Regional trains		Following station
Brumunddal	RE10	Drammen–Oslo S–Lillehammer	Lillehammer
