= Hamar Station =

Railway station in Hamar, Norway

Hamar
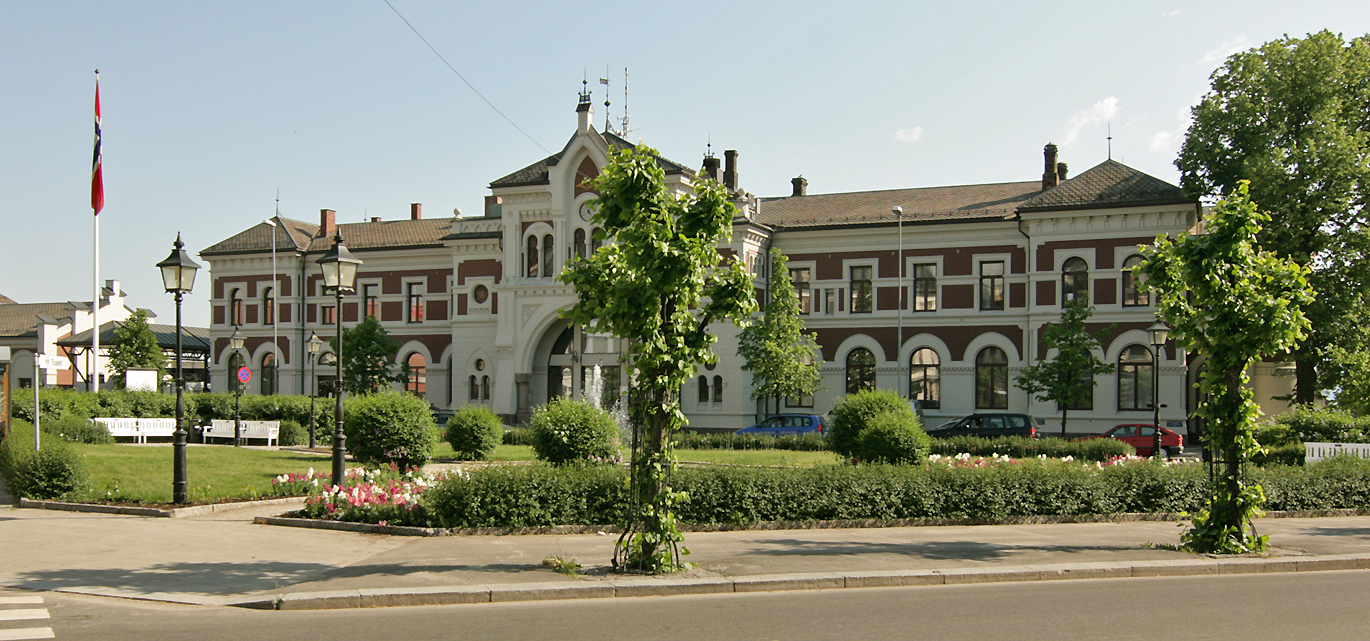

General information
- Location: Hamar; Norway
- Coordinates: 60.7916°N 11.0763°E
- Elevation: 127.0 m (416.7 ft)
- Owner: Bane NOR
- Operator: SJ Norge, Vy
- Lines: Dovre Line; Røros Line
- Distance: 126.26 km (78.45 mi)
- Platforms: 3 (1 side, 2 island)
- Tracks: 3
- Connections: Bus: Innlandstrafikk

Construction
- Parking: 222 spaces
- Cycle facilities: Yes
- Architect: Paul Due

Other information
- Station code: HMR

History
- Opened: 23 June 1862

Passengers
- 1,062,300 (annually)
Location

Hamar Station (Norwegian: Hamar stasjon) is a railway station of the Dovre Line and the Røros Line located in downtown Hamar, Norway. Located 126.26 kilometers (78.45 mi) from Oslo Central Station, it is served by long-distance and regional trains on the Dovre Line, as the terminus for regional trains on the Røros Line. All trains are operated by SJ Norge, except the regional trains between Lillehammer and Oslo, which are operated by Vy. A side platform and an island platform are in regular use. The station handled 1,062,300 passengers in 2008.

The station opened on 23 June 1862 as the western terminus of the narrow-gauge Hamar–Grundset Line, today the Røros Line. The first station building, in Swiss chalet style, was designed by Georg Andreas Bull. Increased traffic caused the construction of a second station building, designed by Balthazar Conrad Lange. It opened in 1880 with the first part of the Dovre Line, which connected Hamar to Oslo. The current station building is designed by Paul Due in historicism. It received major renovations in the 1970s and ahead of the 1994 Winter Olympics. The Dovre Line past Hamar will be upgraded to double track, and in conjunction with this moving the station is being considered.

== History ==
Hamar was incorporated as a town in 1849 and by 1861 had a population of 1,700. Proposals for a railway from Hamar to Elverum were first launched in 1854. The goal was to provide train services across the valley ridge to Østerdalen, where Elverum acted as an important node. From Hamar, the a steam ship service was proposed across the lake of Mjøsa to Eidsvoll, where passengers and cargo could be hauled by train to the capital and coast. The plan was approved by Parliament on 3 September 1857. The necessity of transshipment to steam boat meant that the station had to be located on lakefront property. The place Gammelhusstranda was chosen, but gave the unusual result that the station was situated outside the city limits until a border change in 1878.

Hamar received the railway's administration and became its operational center. The station was designed by Georg Andreas Bull and construction of the wooden buildings were subcontracted to Chr. Eriksen. The line opened on 23 June 1862. The station had limited facilities with shunting being done by horse. In its original configuration the station had three tracks, a main station building, a locomotive depot and a cargo building. Two tracks received a roof. All buildings were wooden, with the two-story main building a log house with paneling in Swiss chalet style. The upper story was used as housing. About forty people worked at the station from the opening.

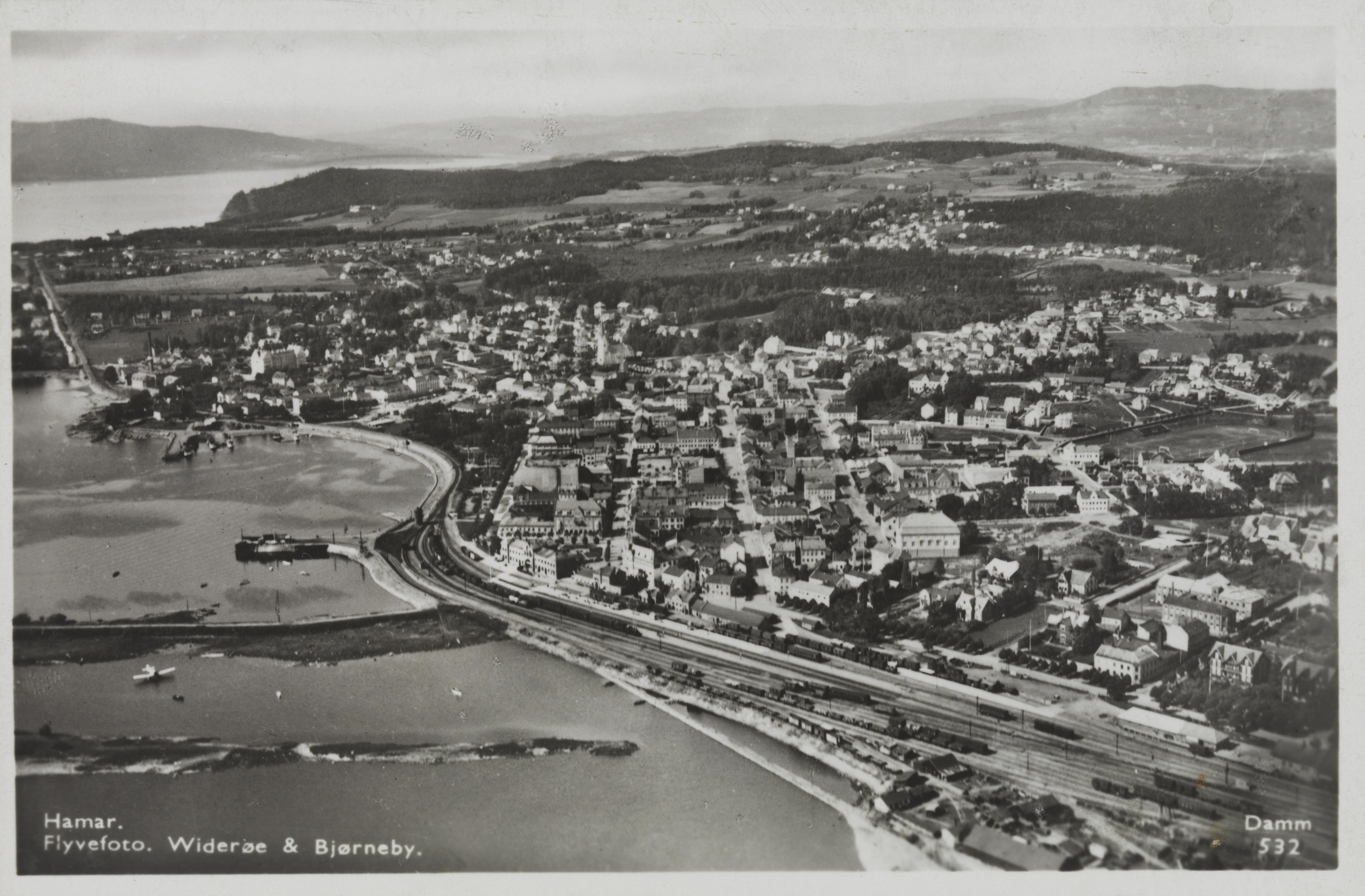
View of Hamar from the south during the early 1930s.

The water station was moved to the depot in 1863. Later a house adjacent to the station building was converted into a railway hotel. The docks received steam crane in 1864, followed by an extension three years later and a new crane in 1875. The traffic at Hamar increased little until 1880. Later known as the Røros Line, the railway was extended further up Østerdalen, eventually being connected with Trondheim in 1877. The main challenge was the inevitable break-of-gauge which would have to take place, as the Trunk Line had been built with standard gauge. The remaining link, the Eidsvoll–Hamar Line, later reclassified as the first part of the Dovre Line, was initially planned as narrow gauge. This was changed by Parliament in 1875, making Hamar the site of the break-of-gauge.

The area and traffic generated by transshipment was so extensive that a new station building was needed. Balthazar Conrad Lange had become NSB's head architect, and was issued the task of designing a new main station building. The second station building was located east of the old, at roughly the location of the current bus station. Also built in wood, it received a roof which hung over the platform. The old station building was converted to railway offices. The track out of the station was moved further away from the lakeshore. The new station was taken into use in 1880.

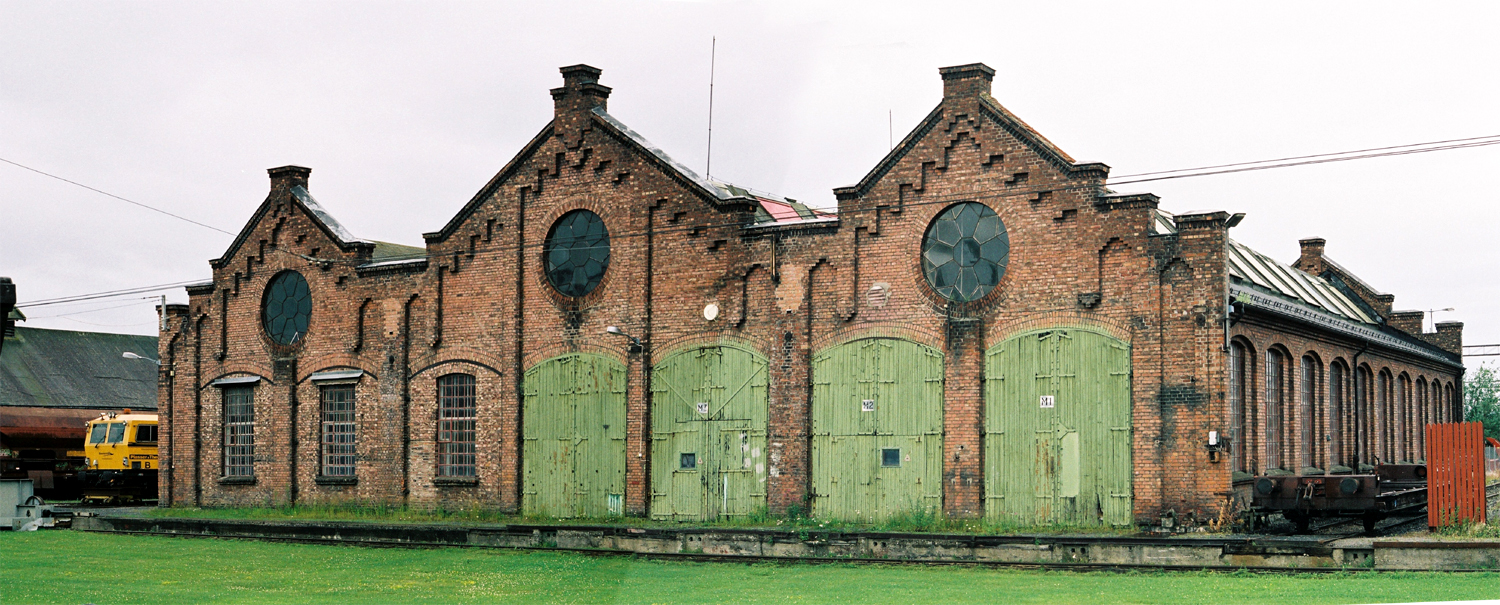
A now disused depot building

With a connection to the capital, plans surfaced for the standard gauge line to be extended northwards through Gudbrandsdalen. With the extension to Sel approved in 1890, three proposals surfaced for the route through Hamar. All three cut the town off from the lakeshore. One involved the line being carried across a swing bridge which would allow access to the port, while two proposed a line across Høiensalodden, either the chosen route or one along Skappelsgate. The second station building had been built further away from the market square and there was a desire to build a new station closer to the town center. The site of the first station was therefore chosen as a suitable site for a new terminal building. The initial station was moved across the street, where it remained until it was demolished in 1925.

Design of the third station building was commissioned to Paul Due, who was working as NSB's head architect at the time. The contract for construction was awarded to Byggmester Schilling from Kristiania. It was completed after completion of the Sel Line, being taken into use on 8 November 1897. At the same time a separate restaurant building opened. The center section of the second station was moved to the deport area, where it served as an office. An expanded depot opened in 1898. The station received electric lighting about 1900 and a new, two-track engine shed opened in 1905. Five years later a second such shed was completed, and a circular shed was finished in 1914.

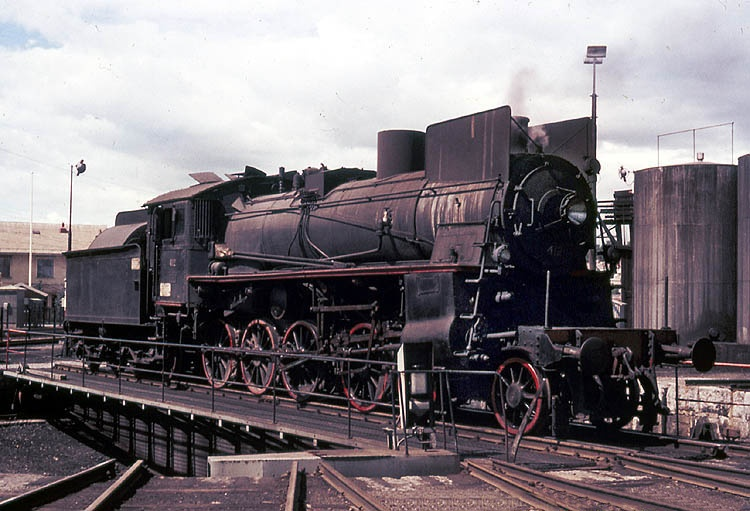
Class 26c steam locomotive on the turntable at Hamar in 1970

With the establishment of the Norwegian State Railways in 1883, Hamar Station became the administrative site for Hamar District. This would by 1924 reach an area consisting of the Dovre Line from Eidsvoll Station to Dombås Station, the Rauma Line, and the Røros Line north to Tynset Station. From 1880 to 1931 Hamar Station received a high amount of activity from its role as transshipment point between the narrow-gauge Røros Line and the standard gauge Eidsvoll–Sel Line. With increasing traffic the station area grew gradually, with an increasing number of tracks, built without any long-term plan. By 1916 there were 96 switches, resulting in low speeds, inefficient and unreliable operation. Despite the number of tracks, shunting often had to be done on the main line. The track arrangements were not cleaned up until the gauge conversion on the Røros Line was completed in 1931. The following year a new interlocking system was installed.

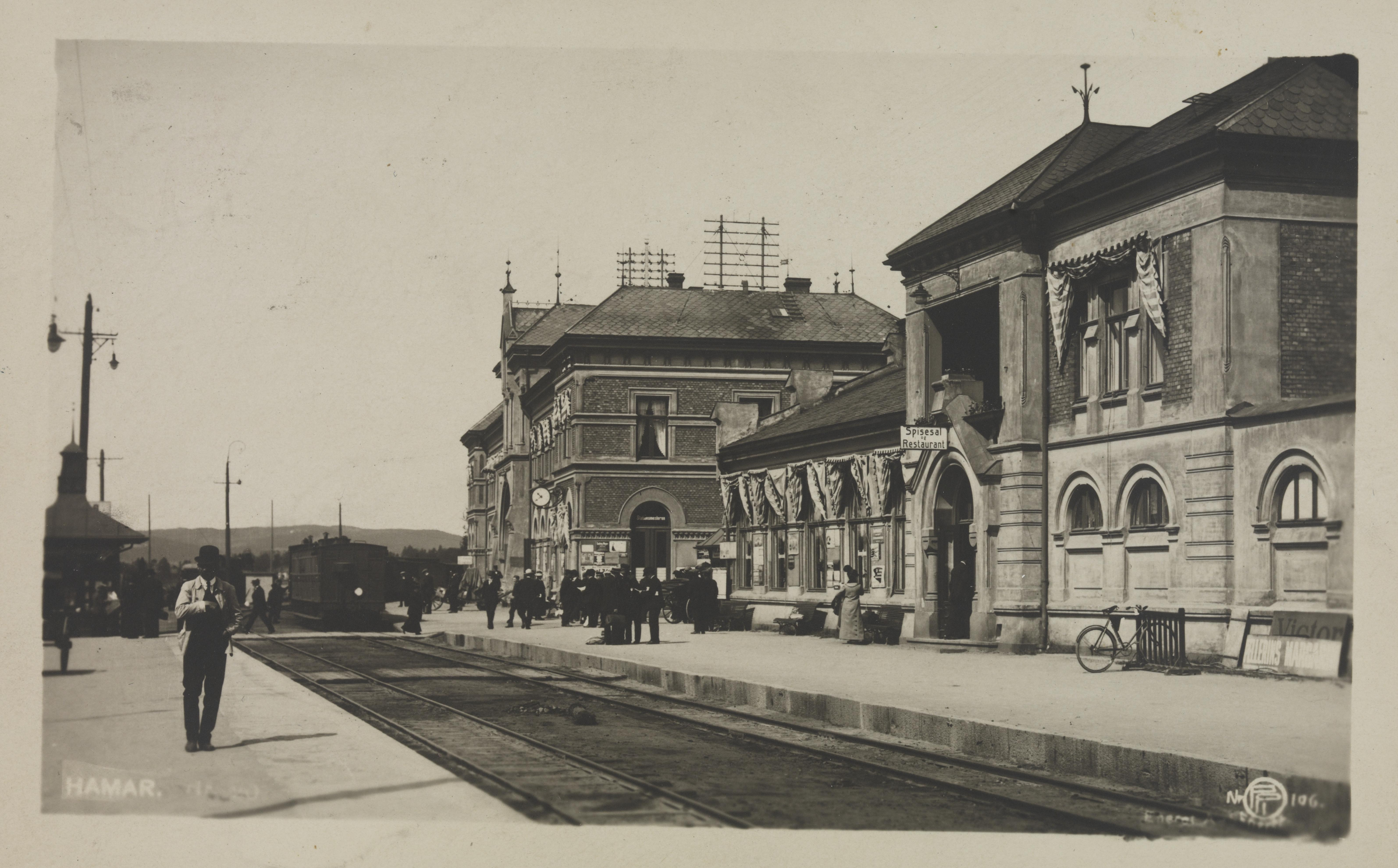
The restaurant building in the foreground and the station building behind it, some time between 1905 and 1912

After having been operated by Harald Larsen, the restaurant was taken over by Norsk Spisevognselskap on 1 January 1921, who paid NOK 87,786 for the inventory. The following year they redecorated it based on drawings by Gudmund Hoel, with the dining room decorated by theater painter Jens Wang. He made several large fresco paintings, including the ruins of Hamar Cathedral, motives from Mjøsa, Åkersvika and an old settlement in Hedmark style. On the northern wall there were two large paintings, one of Høsbjør Tourist Hotel and one of a view of Mjøsa. The renovation of the restaurant cost NOK 43,000 and was taken into use on 15 December 1922. A station park was installed in front of the station in 1924.

The Norwegian Railway Museum has its origins from 1896. It gathered historical items from various railways and had from the opening of the third station until 1912 a display in the upper floor of the terminus building. At that time the station ran out of place and the museum had to relocate. It lacked a venue for more than a decade while its board searched for a proper site. This issue was settled in 1925, when the museum secured a lot to the north of Hamar Station. It could open as an open-air museum in 1930. NSB took formal ownership of the museum in 1946 and the lot on was it. A new and larger museum could was opened in 1956.

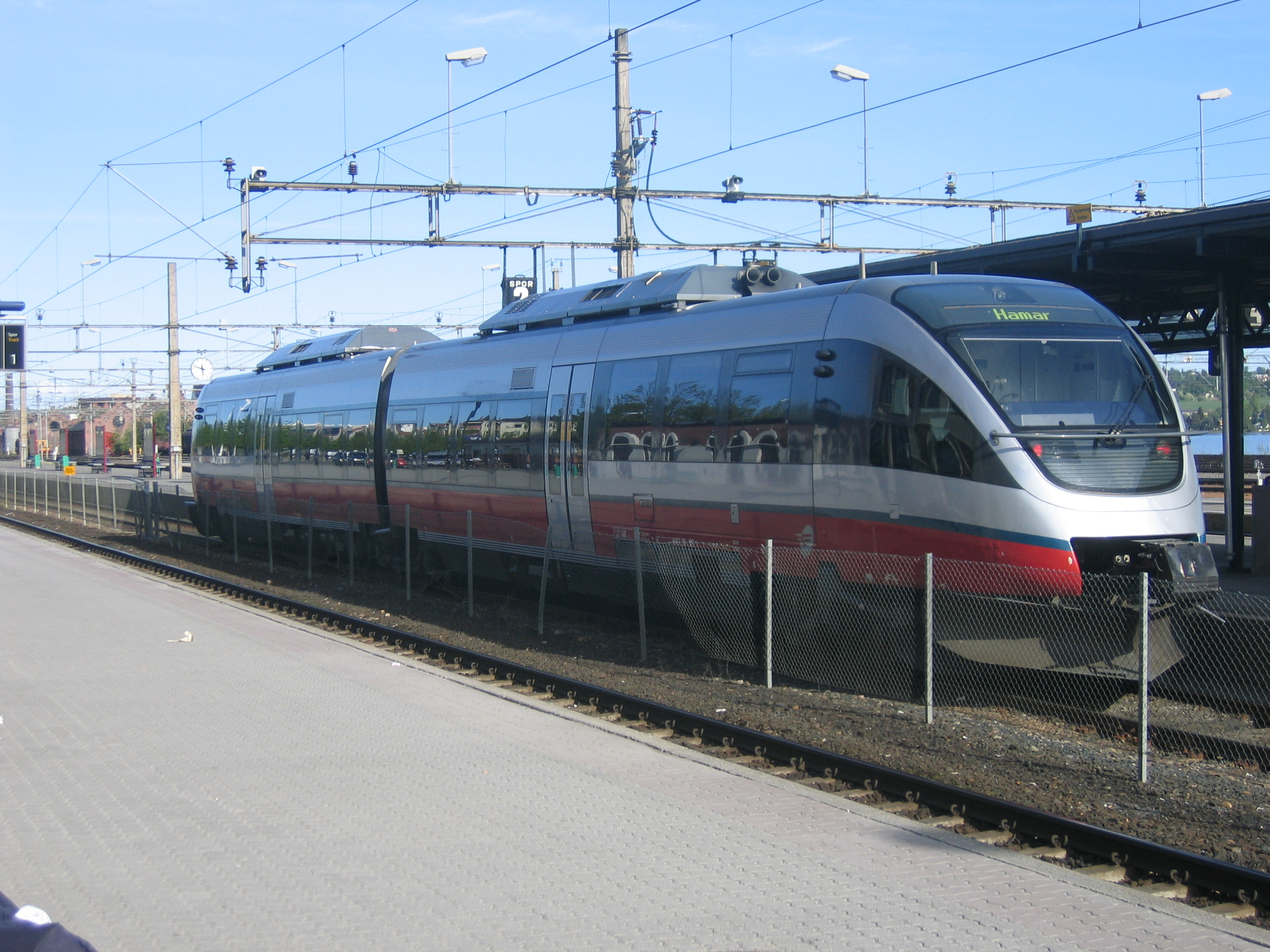
Class 93 diesel train at Hamar, used on the Røros Line

The Dovre Line south of Hamar to Eidsvoll was electrified on 15 June 1953. Electrification further north had to wait until 1 November 1966, as part of the effort to electrify the entirety of the Dovre Line. Class 86 diesel multiple units were introduced on the Røros Line in 1956, and a shed was built for them that year. Centralized traffic control opened from Tangen Station to Hamar on 30 May 1965, and onwards to Lillehammer Station on 29 April 1966. A new interlocking system was installed in 1969.

The station building was renovated in the 1970s in a brutal fashion which eliminated many of the original architectural interior elements. Particularly the entrances and the central hall received contemporary elements, such as an aluminum shell. The roof ornaments were not demolished but simply covered. Automatic train stop was installed on 1 November 1983. The station park was renovated in 1990.

Hamar Station received an upgrade ahead of the 1994 Winter Olympics, for which Hamar was a host city. The original station building was little suited for modern use and the outdoor areas served transfer to bus, car and taxis poorly. NSB therefore decided to demolish the cargo and electric buildings to make room for a new bus terminal. The remaining part of the station, including the restaurant building, were renovated to as close to the original plans and interior as feasible, largely undoing the work of the 1970s. The work involved building an underpass and an overpass to tracks 2 and 3. The project was funded as a joint project between NSB, Hamar Municipality, Hedmark County Municipality and the Norwegian Public Roads Administration. Staffed ticket sales by NSB were terminated on 19 January 2002 and taken over by Narvesen.

== Architecture ==
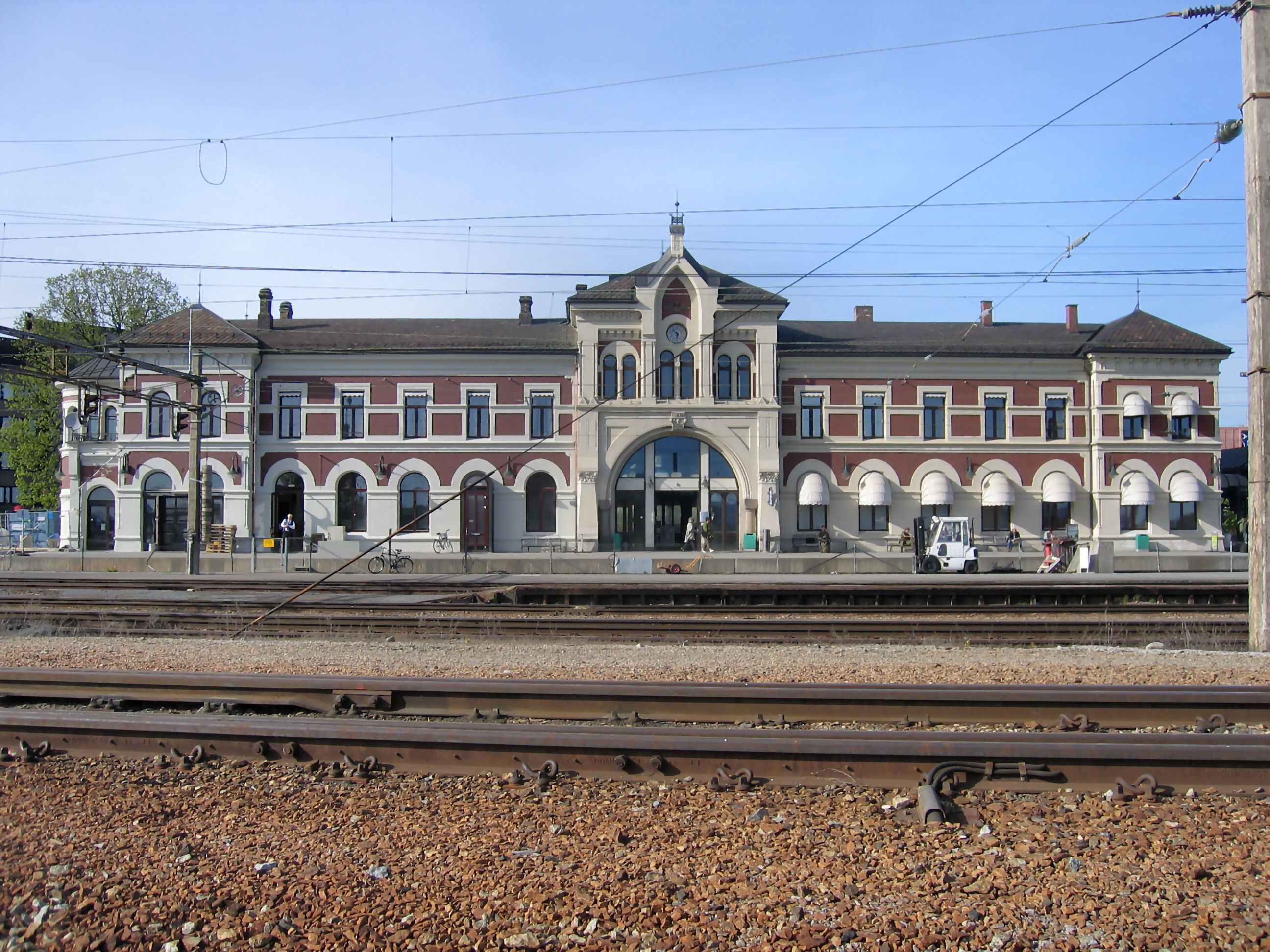
The station building as seen from the track side

The third and current main station building is designed by Paul Due in historicism. It is built with plastered brick, with dominant sections in red brick and details in yellow plaster. It features a prominent central section with plastered gables facing both towards the town and the platforms. The main entrances there are formed as triumphal arches in Romanesque style. The historicist design is reflected through a neo-baroque central part, New Renaissance wings, all with New Gothic and Romanesque windows and decors. The otherwise symmetrical form is broken by a round staircase on the northern end. The lower floor was initially designed as public areas and

The terminal building is widely regarded as Paul Due's magnum opus. It is situated at the lower end of Hamar's main street, Strandgata, with the other end of the street featuring Hamar's basar. South of the station building is Due's restaurant building. It has a similar style to the station building, but lacks symmetry. It originally had a medieval-inspired interior, but this was changed to Neoclassical in 1922.

== Facilities ==
The station is situated on the Dovre Line, 126.26 kilometers (78.45 mi) from Oslo Central Station and 426.6 kilometers (265.1 mi) from Trondheim Central Station, at an elevation of 127 meters (417 ft). Hamar Station is also the southern terminus of the Røros Line. The station has 3 tracks. Track 1 is served by a 414-meter (1,358 ft) long side platform which is 62 centimeters (24 in) tall, normally used by southbound trains. Track 2 and 3 share a 365-meter (1,198 ft) long and 52 centimeters (20 in) tall island platform. Track 2 normally serves trains on the Røros Line, while track 3 serves northbound trains on the Dovre Line. Tracks 2 and 3 are accessible from an underpass from the station building and an overpass to the south of the station. The station building features a heated waiting room, a café and kiosk, as well as luggage lockers, washrooms and ticket vending machines. It also hosts a staff canteen. Ticket sale is offered at the Narvesen kiosk. There is parking for 222 cars about 300 meters (980 ft) from the station. A bus station and taxi stand are located south of the station, while there is bicycle parking to the north. The station is located 2 kilometers (1.2 mi) from the Norwegian Railway Museum.

== Services ==
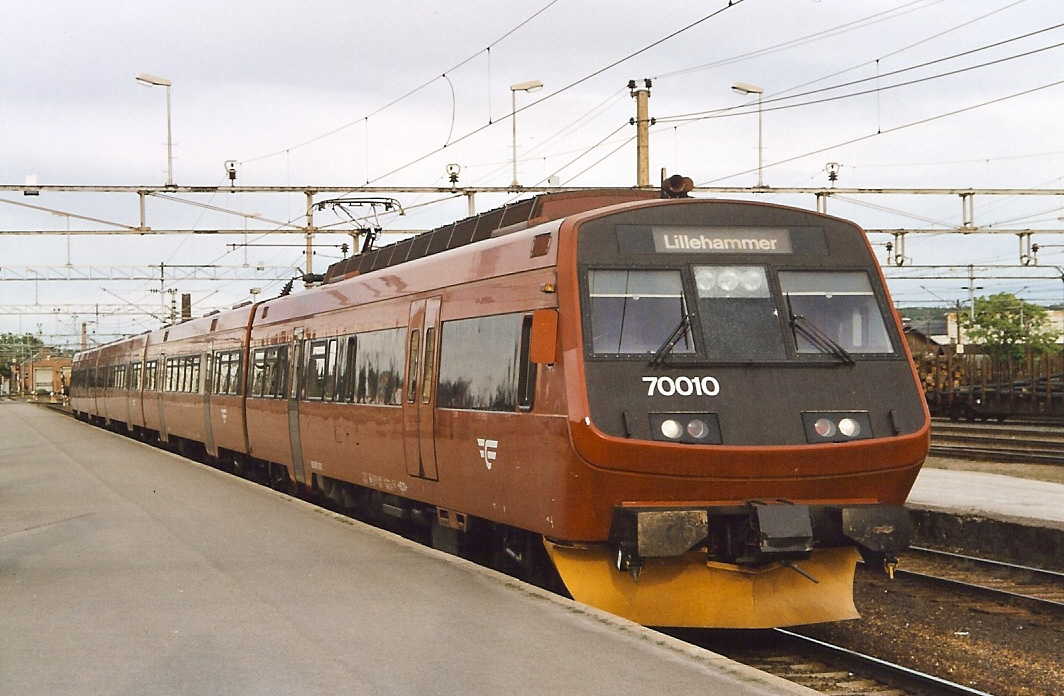
Class 70 regional train bound for Lillehammer at Hamar Station in 2001

Hamar Station is served by all passenger trains operating along the Dovre Line and the Røros Line. This includes express trains between Oslo and Trondheim, Intercity trains between Drammen and Lillehammer, and regional trains on the Røros Line. Travel time to Oslo Central Station is 1 hour and 23 minutes by regional train. The station had 10,300 annual passengers in 2008. There are bus services which connect to surrounding areas.

== Future ==
The Norwegian National Rail Administration is in the process of building a new, double-track, high-speed network in Eastern Norway, the Intercity Triangle. One of the three main radians is the Dovre Line from Oslo to Lillehammer. Plans call for the upgrade of the section from Oslo Airport to Hamar by 2024, and completion of the segment north of Hamar by 2030. This involves finding a new right-of-way through Hamar. Three main routes have been proposed. The western alternative will keep the station at its current location, with three different route proposals. The central alternative would move the station to the vicinity of the town hall, with the east alternative would create a new station located at Disen near Vikingskipet.

== Bibliography ==
- Bjerke, Thor; Stenersen, Roar (2004). Rørosbaneboka (in Norwegian). Hamar: Norsk Jernbanemuseum / Norsk Jernbaneklubb. ISBN 82-90286-24-4.
- Bjerke, Thor; Holom, Finn (2004). Banedata 2004 (in Norwegian). Hamar / Oslo: Norwegian Railway Museum / Norwegian Railway Club. ISBN 82-90286-28-7.
- Gjerdåker, Brynjulv (1998). Stifstad og bygdeby (in Norwegian). Hamar: Hedmark Municipality. ISBN 82-994906-1-8.
- Hals, Anne (1999). Byutvikling i Hamar – Arkitektur gjennom 150 år (in Norwegian). Hamar: Hedmark Museum. ISBN 82-91326-11-8.
- Just, Carl (1949). A/S Norsk Spisevognselskap 1919–1949 (in Norwegian). Oslo: Norsk Spisevognselskap. OCLC 40310643.
- Norwegian Railway Museum (1998). Velkommen til Norsk Jernbanemuseum (in Norwegian). Hamar.
- Norwegian State Railways (1994). Hamar stasjon 1862–1994 (in Norwegian). Oslo.

Preceding station	Express trains		Following station
Oslo Airport towards Oslo S		F6	Lillehammer towards Trondheim S
Preceding station	Regional trains		Following station
Stange	RE10	Drammen–Oslo S–Lillehammer	Brumunddal
Terminus	R60	Hamar–Røros	Ilseng
