= Ronglan =

Village in Levanger Municipality, Norway

- Village
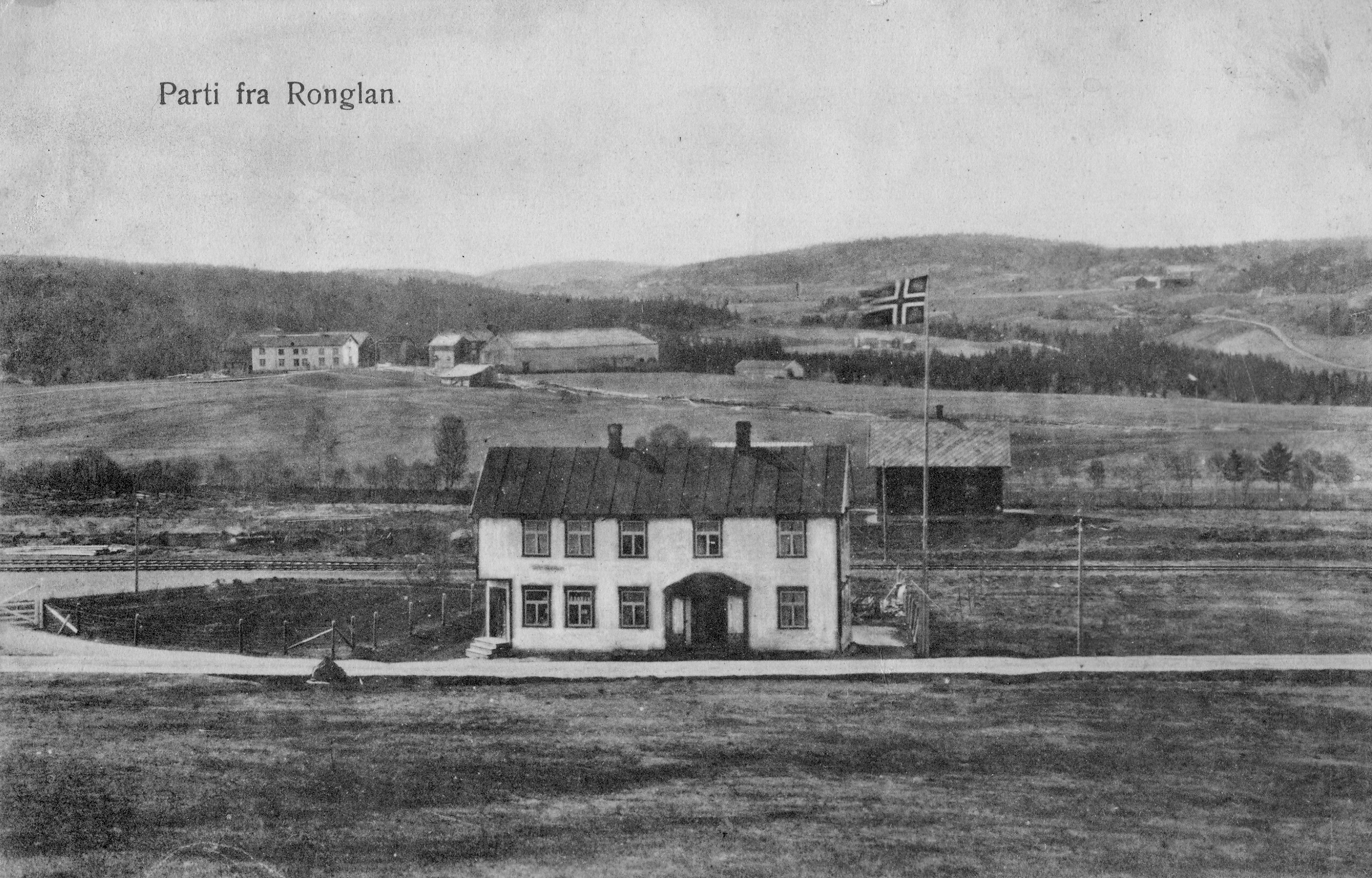
- View of the village
- Interactive map of Ronglan
- Location within Trøndelag Location within Norway
- Coordinates: 63.6648°N 11.1125°E
- Country: Norway
- Region: Central Norway
- County: Trøndelag
- District: Innherred
- Municipality: Levanger Municipality
- Elevation: 63 m (207 ft)
- Time zone: UTC+01:00 (CET)
  - Summer (DST): UTC+02:00 (CEST)
- Post Code: 7623 Ronglan

Ronglan is a village in Levanger Municipality in Trøndelag county, Norway. It is located southwest of the village of Skogn and southeast of the village of Ekne. The European route E6 highway goes through the village. The Nordlandsbanen railway line runs through the village, stopping at Ronglan Station.
