= Skogn Station =

Railway station in Levanger, Norway

Skogn Station Skogn stasjon
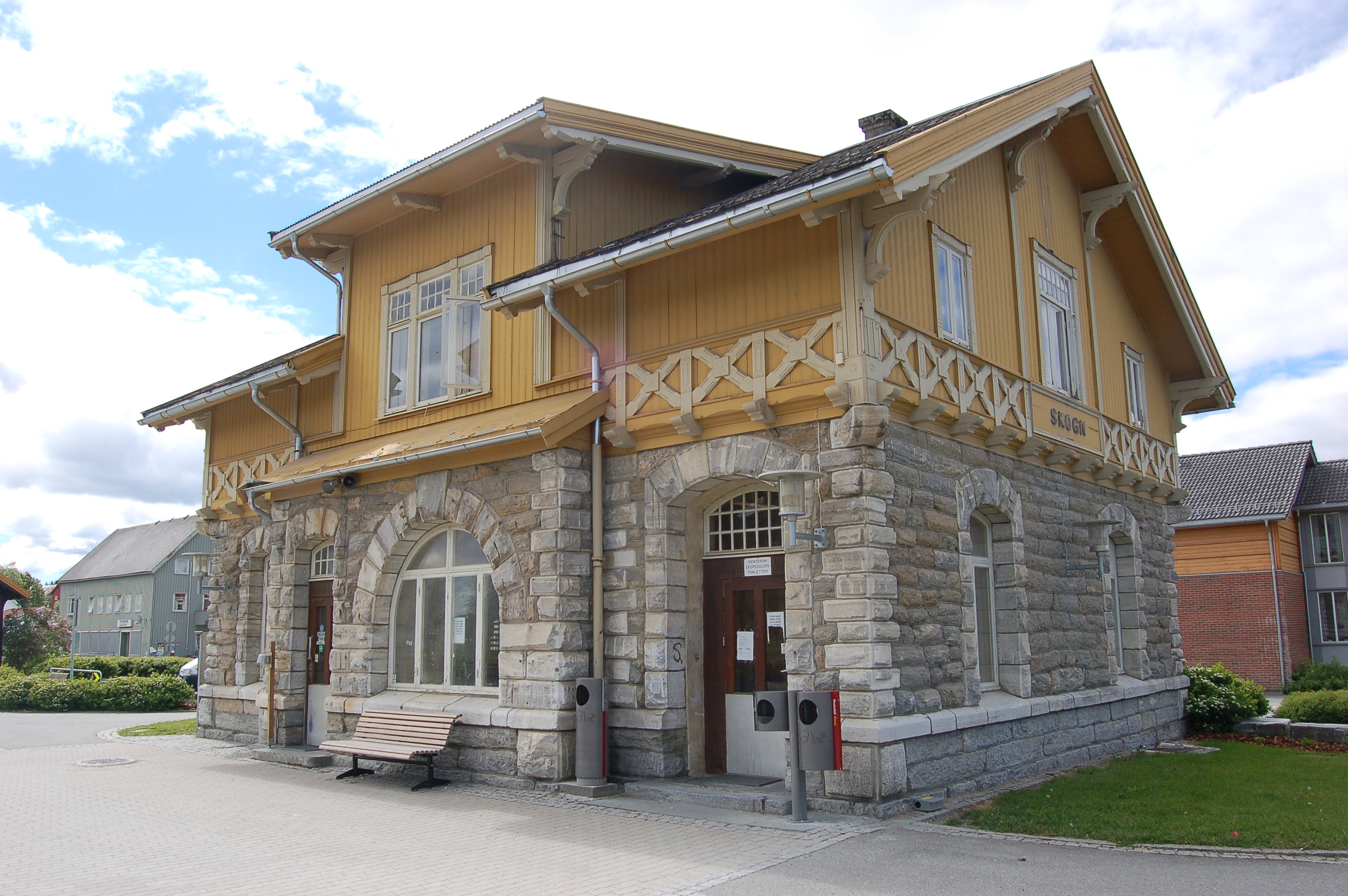
- View of the station

General information
- Location: Skogn, Levanger Municipality; Trøndelag; Norway
- Coordinates: 63.705057°N 11.194286°E
- Elevation: 49.9 metres (164 ft) above sea level
- System: Railway station
- Owner: Bane NOR
- Operator: SJ Norge
- Line: Nordlandsbanen
- Distance: 76.01 kilometres (47.23 mi)
- Connections: Bus: AtB

Construction
- Architect: Paul Due

History
- Opened: 29 October 1902
Location
- Location within Trøndelag Location within Norway

Skogn Station (Norwegian: Skogn stasjon) is a railway station located in the village of Skogn in Levanger Municipality in Trøndelag county, Norway. It is located on the Nordland Line railway line. The station is served hourly by the Trøndelag Commuter Rail service to Steinkjer and Trondheim. The service is operated by SJ Norge.

== History ==
The station was opened on 29 October 1902 on the Hell–Sunnan Line between Hell Station and Levanger Station as the section to Levanger was finished. The station was designed by Paul Due and was built with a surrounding park.

Preceding station		Following station
Ronglan	Nordland Line	Levanger; Sykehuset Levanger
Preceding station	Local trains	Following station
Ronglan	Trøndelag Commuter Rail	Levanger
