= Levanger Station =

Railway station in Levanger, Norway

Levanger Station Levanger stasjon
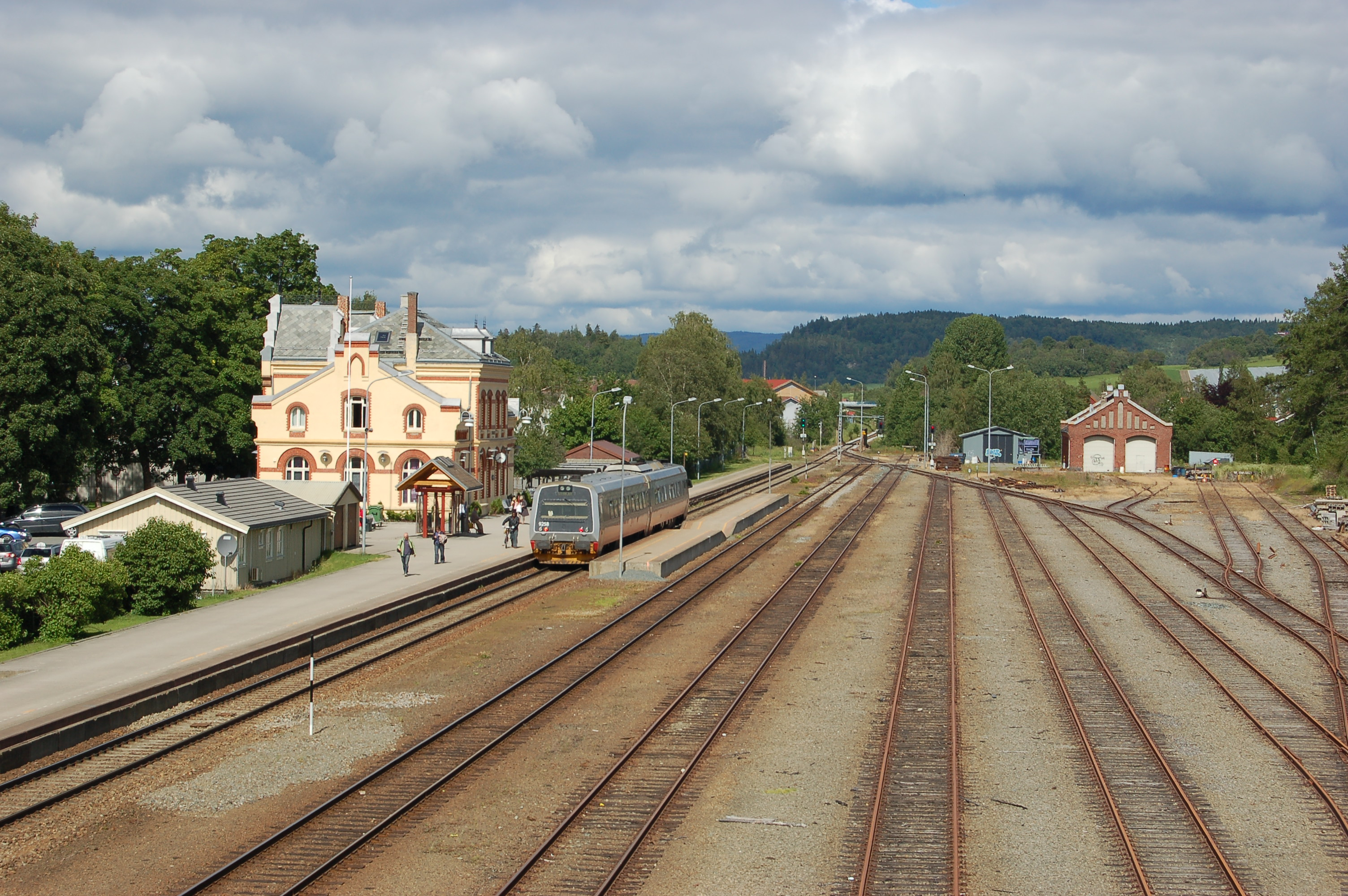
- View of the station

General information
- Location: Levanger, Levanger Municipality; Trøndelag; Norway
- Coordinates: 63.744731°N 11.300719°E
- Elevation: 3.3 metres (11 ft) above sea level
- System: Railway station
- Owner: Bane NOR
- Operator: SJ Norge
- Line: Nordlandsbanen
- Distance: 83.90 kilometres (52.13 mi)
- Connections: Bus: AtB

Construction
- Architect: Paul Due

Other information
- Station code: LEV

History
- Opened: 29 October 1902
Location
- Location within Trøndelag Location within Norway

Levanger Station (Norwegian: Levanger stasjon) is a railway station located in the centre of the town of Levanger in Levanger Municipality in Trøndelag county, Norway. The station is located along the Nordland Line. The station serves both local and express trains northbound through Innherred and to Nordland, and southbound to Trondheim. The Trøndelag Commuter Rail, which runs between Steinkjer and Trondheim, stops at Levanger, and operates at a one-hour intervals.

== History ==
The station was opened on 29 October 1902 on the Hell–Sunnan Line as the section to Levanger was finished. There was at the time of construction a controversy as to whether the station should be in the western or eastern part of town. Operation of the restaurant was run by Norsk Spisevognselskap between 1 October 1934 and 8 May 1945.

== Media gallery ==
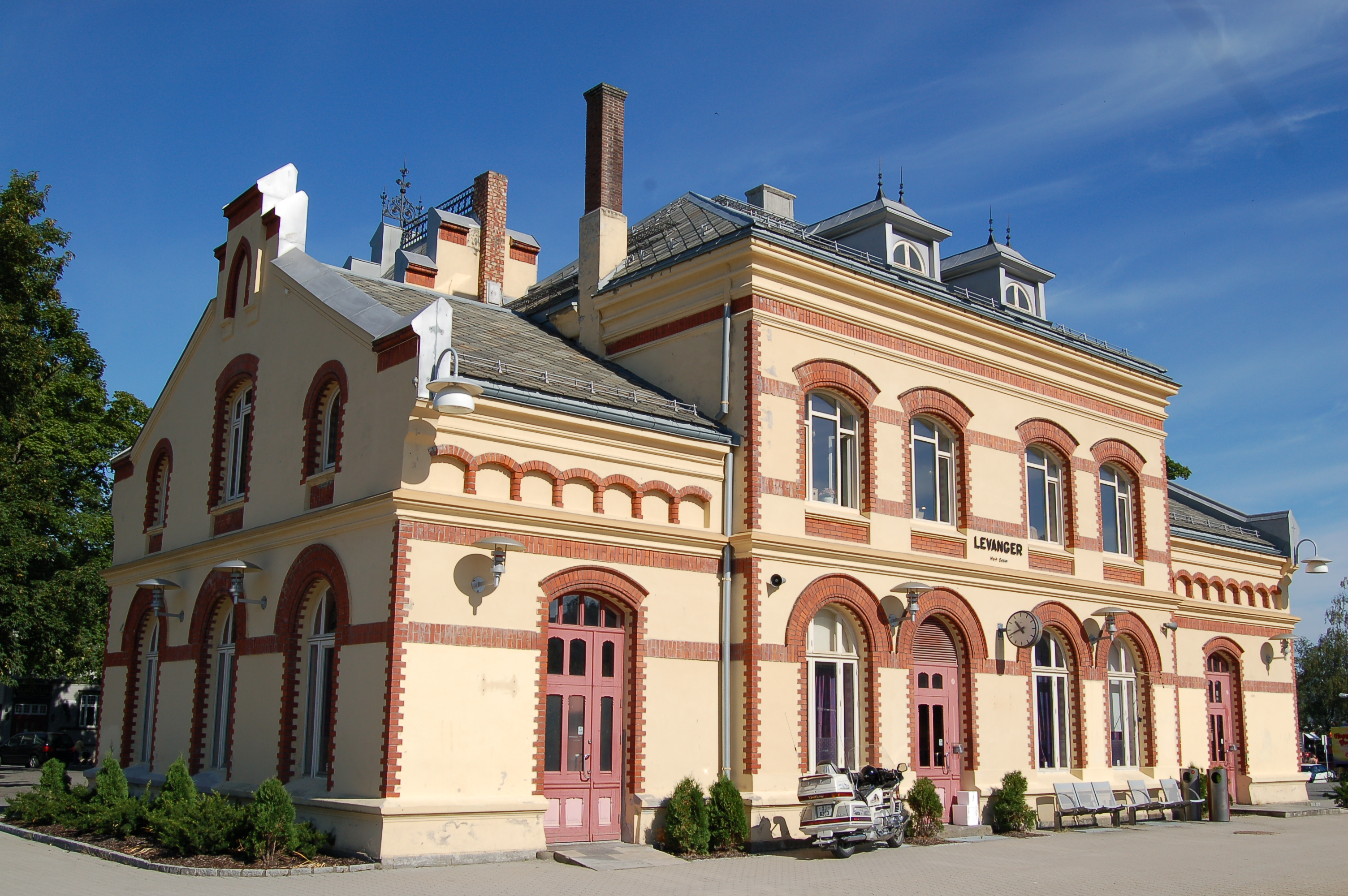
Levanger station, facing the tracks.

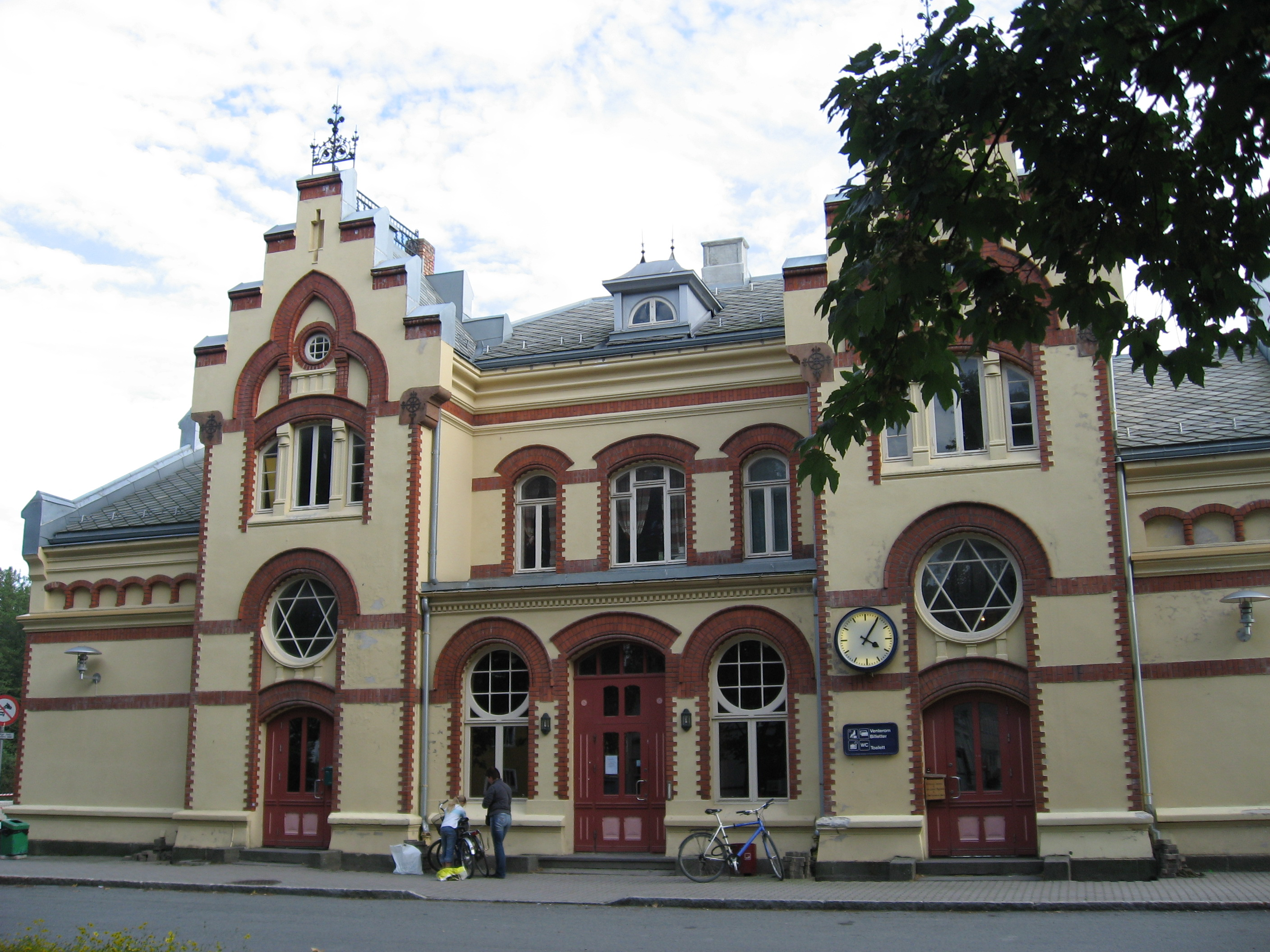
Levanger station, city façade.

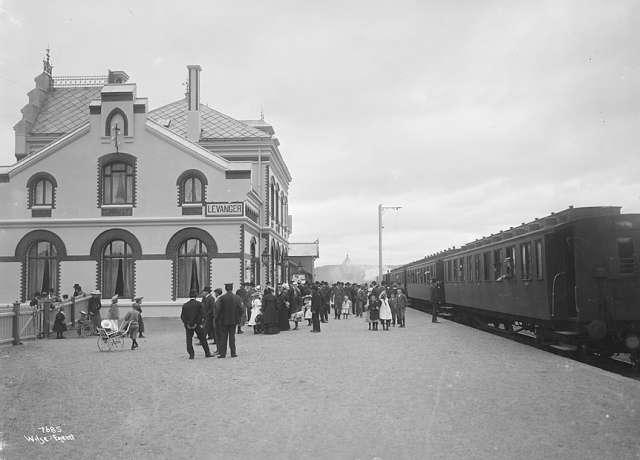
Train at Levanger station in 1907.

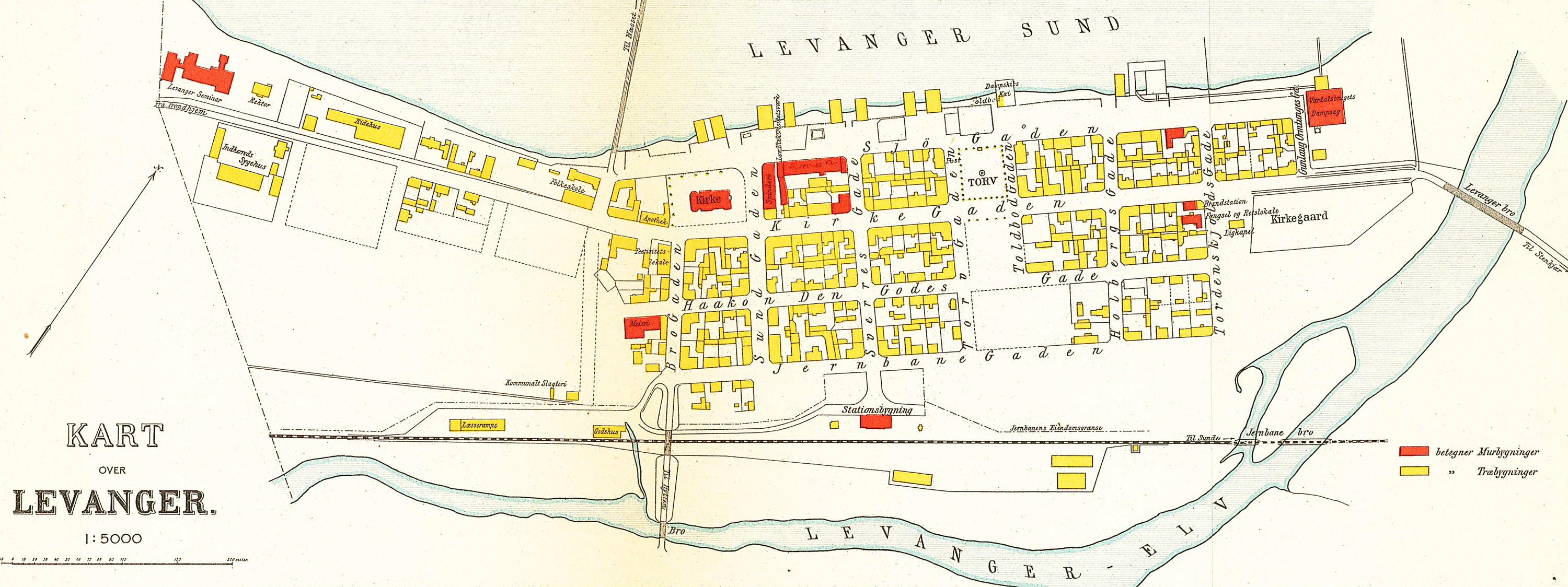
Levanger map from 1909. The station is the southernmost red building.

Preceding station	Express trains	Following station
Stjørdal towards Trondheim S	F7	Steinkjer towards Bodø
Preceding station	Local trains	Following station
Skogn	Trøndelag Commuter Rail	HiNT Røstad
