= Lillehammer Station =

Railway station in Lillehammer, Norway

Lillehammer
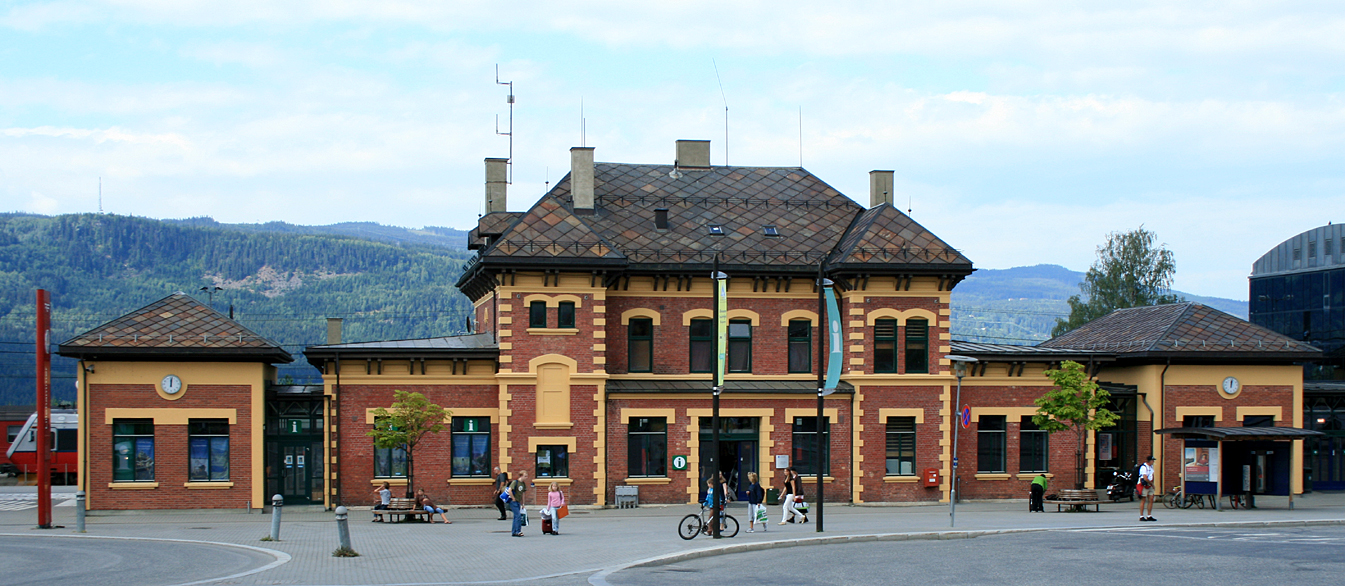

General information
- Location: Downtown, Lillehammer; Norway
- Coordinates: 61°6′52″N 10°27′41″E
- Elevation: 179.5 m (589 ft) AMSL
- Owner: Bane NOR
- Operator: SJ Norge, Vy
- Line: Dovre Line
- Distance: 184.18 km (114.44 mi)
- Platforms: 3
- Connections: Bus: Innlandstrafikk

Construction
- Architect: Paul Due

Other information
- Station code: LHM
- IATA code: XXL

History
- Opened: 1894
Location

Lillehammer is a railway station located in downtown Lillehammer, Norway, on the Dovre Line. The station was opened in 1894 with the construction of the railway between Hamar Station and Tretten Station. The station got a major overhaul before the 1994 Winter Olympics in Lillehammer. It is located 184.18 kilometers (114.44 mi) from Oslo Central Station and at 179.5 meters (589 ft) above mean sea level.

Lillehammer is served by express trains to Trondheim and is the terminus of the regional trains north to Åndalsnes, and south to Oslo and Drammen. Express trains and regional trains to the north are operated by SJ Norge, regional trains to the south are operated by Vy. Bus service is available by Innlandstrafikk.

On 1 June 1923, the restaurant was taken over by Norsk Spisevognselskap. The facilities were too small, but the company's capital was being used to build Opdal Turisthotell, and funding for expansion of the restaurant in Lillehammer was not available. In October 1937, the restaurant was closed and replaced by a kiosk from April 1938.

Preceding station	Express trains		Following station
Hamar towards Oslo S		F6	Hunderfossen towards Trondheim S
Preceding station	Regional trains		Following station
Moelv	RE10	Drammen–Oslo S–Lillehammer	Terminus
