= Paul Due (architect) =

Norwegian architect (1835–1919)

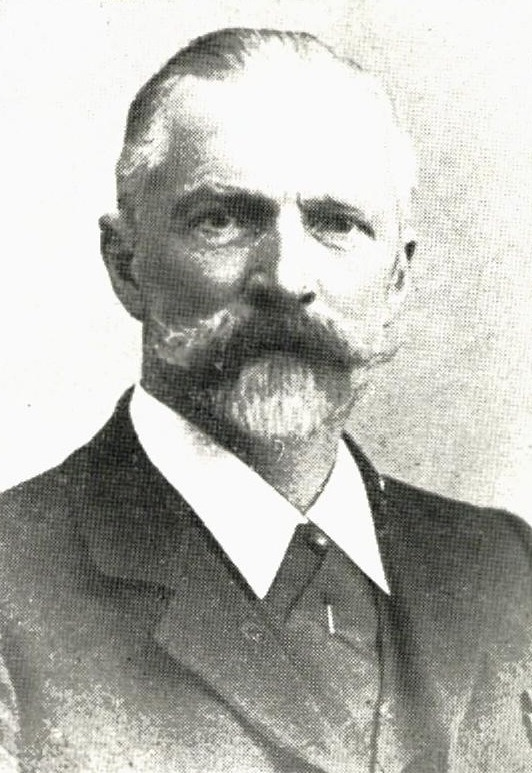
Paul Due

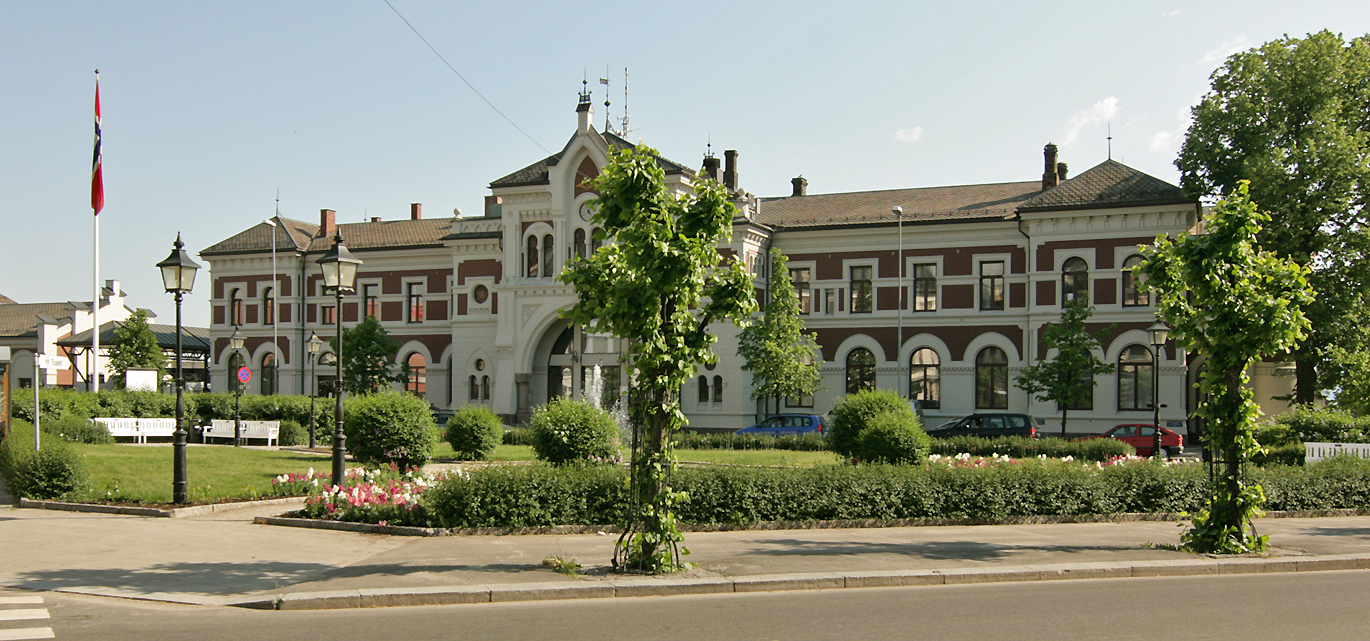
Hamar Station

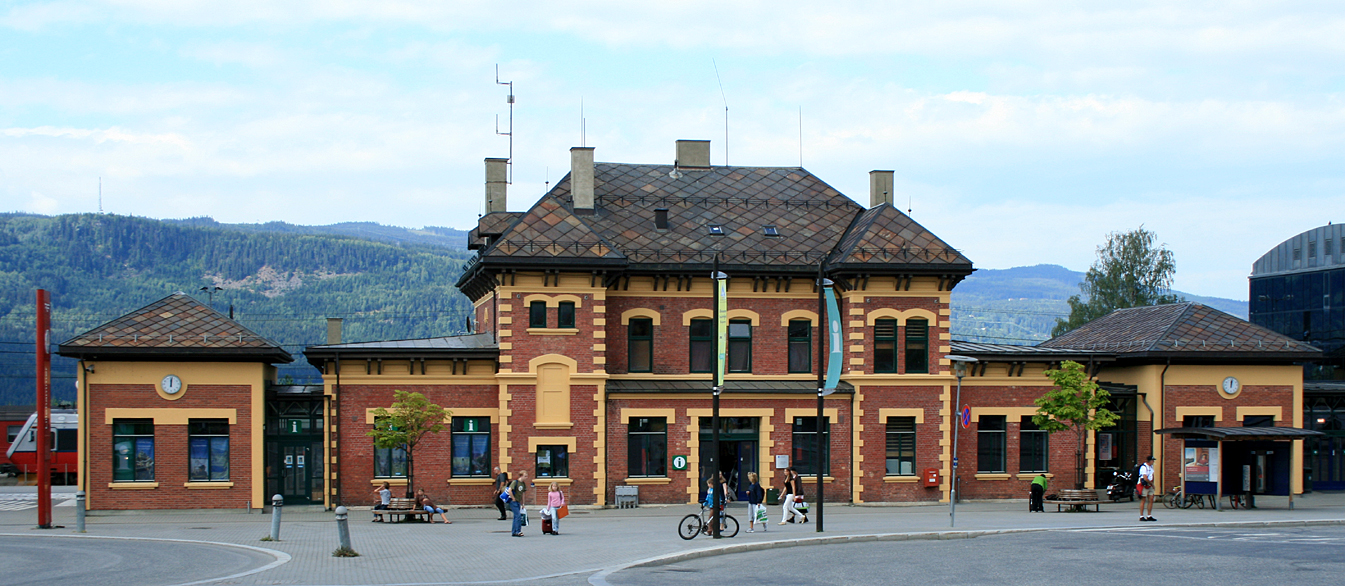
Lillehammer Station

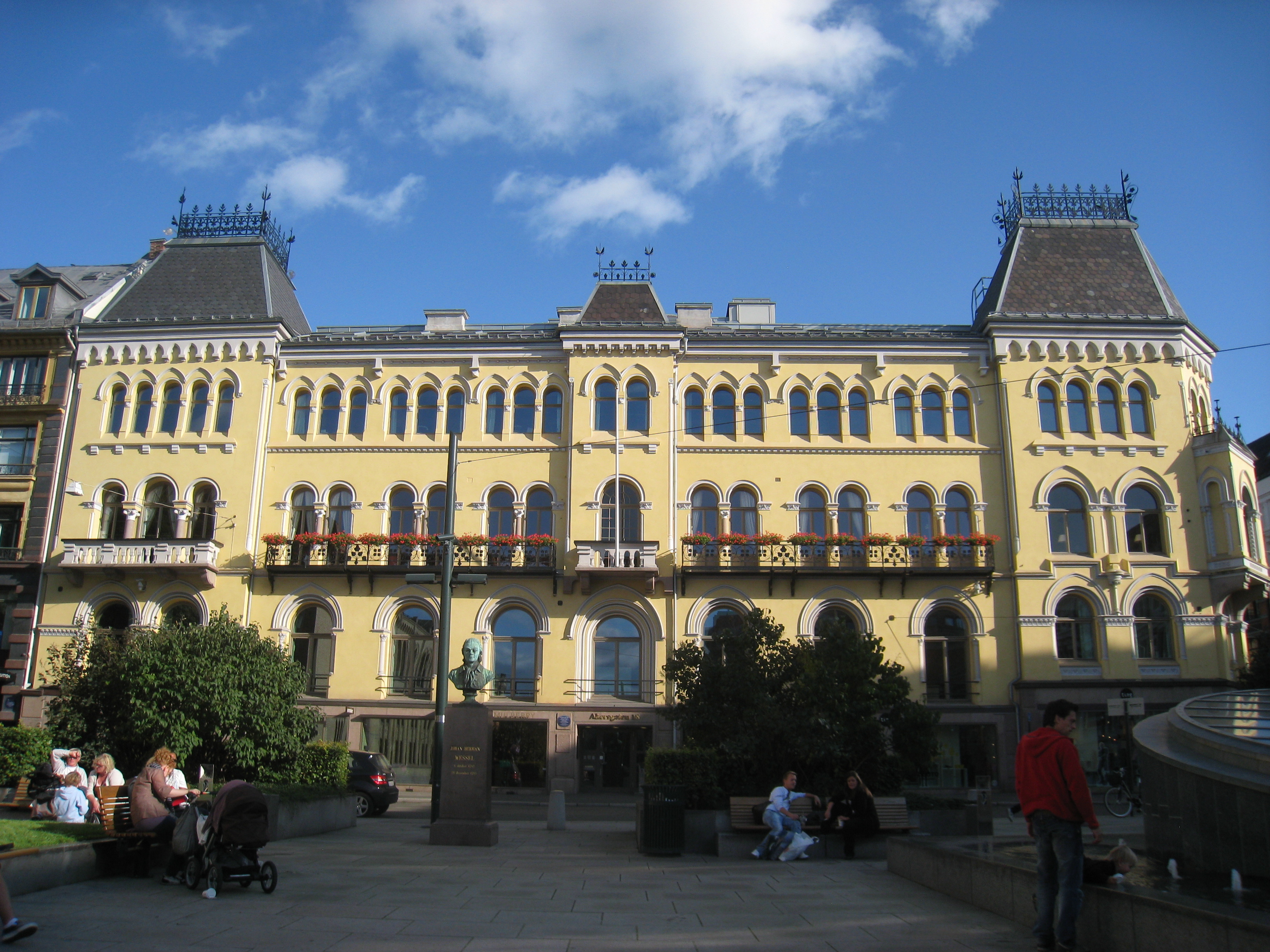
Athenaeum, Oslo

Paul Due (13 August 1835 – 26 February 1919) was a Norwegian architect and significant contributor to the stations built by the Norwegian State Railways.

== Biography ==
Paul Due was born in Kristiansand, Norway. He graduated in engineering science at Leibniz University Hannover in the years 1852–1856. After graduating, he traveled to the United States, where he was first assistant in the United States Coast Survey, then from 1857 to 1859 employed at the architectural office in Chicago and then in New York City, where he executed drawings for renovation of City Hall. From 1860 to 1865 he lived in Charleston, Virginia. Among other things he planned fortifications at Richmond, Virginia for the Confederacy during the American Civil War.

When he returned to Norway, he designed 23 buildings in Drammen after the city was hit by the great fire in 1866. He worked with Bernhard Christoph Steckmest (1846–1926) in the firm of Due & Steckmest from 1870-1890. During this period, the firm provided plans for a number of notable buildings in Oslo. After ending their cooperation in 1890, Due worked as a railway architect for the Norwegian State Railways until 1912. During this period he designed more than 150 railway stations, including the stations at Hamar, Kristiansand, Levanger and Kornsjø. One of his most important buildings from this time period, the Hamar Railway Station dating from 1896, replaced former wooden buildings by architects Georg Andreas Bull and Balthazar Lange.

Due was co-founder and chairman of the Norwegian Engineering and Architectural Association. He served as a member of the tax commission 1872-80, and a member of the Oslo Building Commission from 1884 to 1888. In 1907, he was a member of the evaluation committee for the competition of the Nidaros Cathedral West Front. He became an honorary member of the Society of Architects in 1899 and an honorary member of Norway's Engineering and Architectural Association in 1887. During 1897, he was knighted in the Royal Norwegian Order of St. Olav.

== Personal life ==
Paul Due was born in Christiania as the son of Oluf Christian Due and Anna Catharine Vibe, and through his father a nephew of Prime Minister Frederik Due. He married Francisca Wilhelmine Witte (1834–1918) in 1858, while they were living in Texas. They had six children. One of their sons was noted architect Paul Armin Due.

== Selected work of Due & Steckmest ==
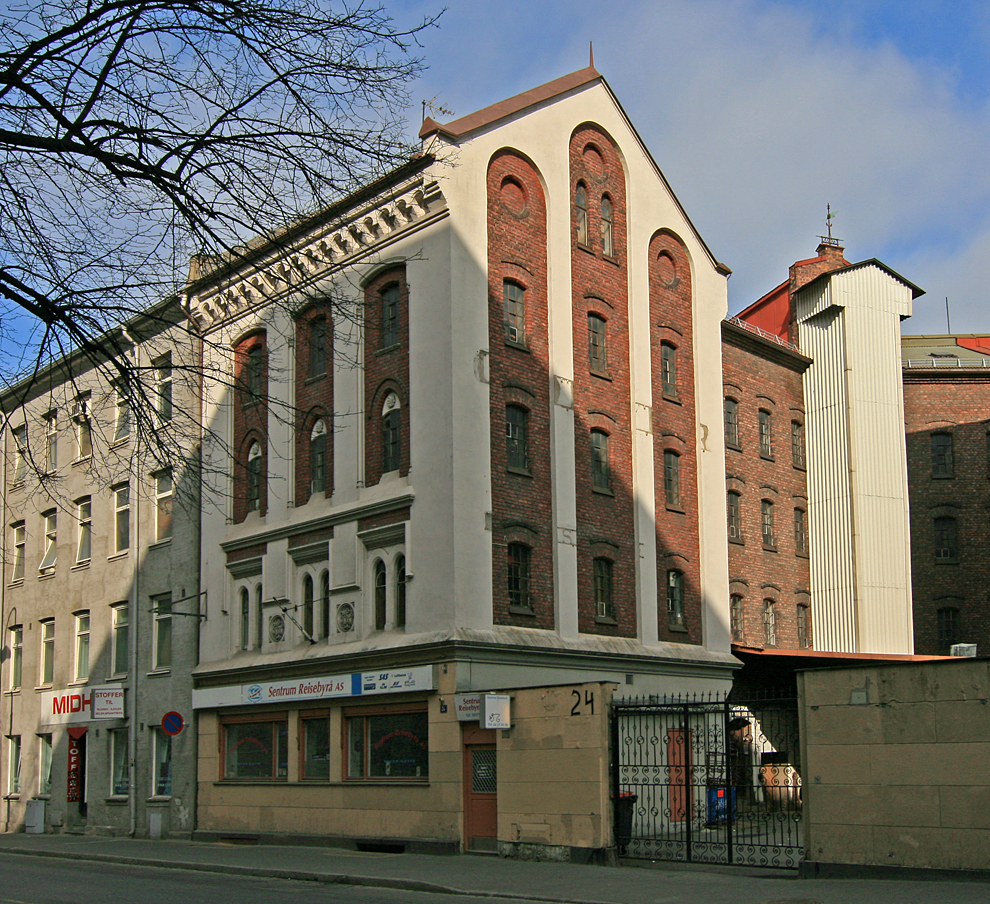
Stenersgata 24, Oslo

- 1872 - Parkveien 43, Oslo
- 1873–1875 - the Lykkeberg villa in the Lykkeberg park, Fredrikstad
- 1873 - Tenements at Inkognitogaten 16, Oslo
- 1875 - The 'Onsumslottet' building at St. Halvards gate 33, Oslo,
- 1875 - Due's own villa at Inkognitogaten 14, Oslo
- 1877 - Parkveien 41a, Oslo
- 1880–1881 - The buildings at Sehesteds plass, Oslo
- 1881 - Uranienborg terrasse 11, Oslo
- 1883 - St. Edmund's Church, Oslo
- 1885–1889 - The buildings at Solli plass, Oslo
- 1887 - The 'Ringnesslottet', Colletts gate 43, Oslo
- 1889 - Uranienborg terrasse 9, Oslo
- 1889 - Stenersgata 24, Oslo
