= Figga =

Figga may refer to:

- Figgja, a river in Steinkjer, Norway
- Hood Figga, a song by rapper Gorilla Zoe from the 2007 album Welcome to the Zoo
- JT the Bigga Figga, American hip hop producer and rapper
- Mike Figga (born 1970), Major League Baseball catcher
