= Vinne =

Village in Verdal Municipality, Norway

- Village
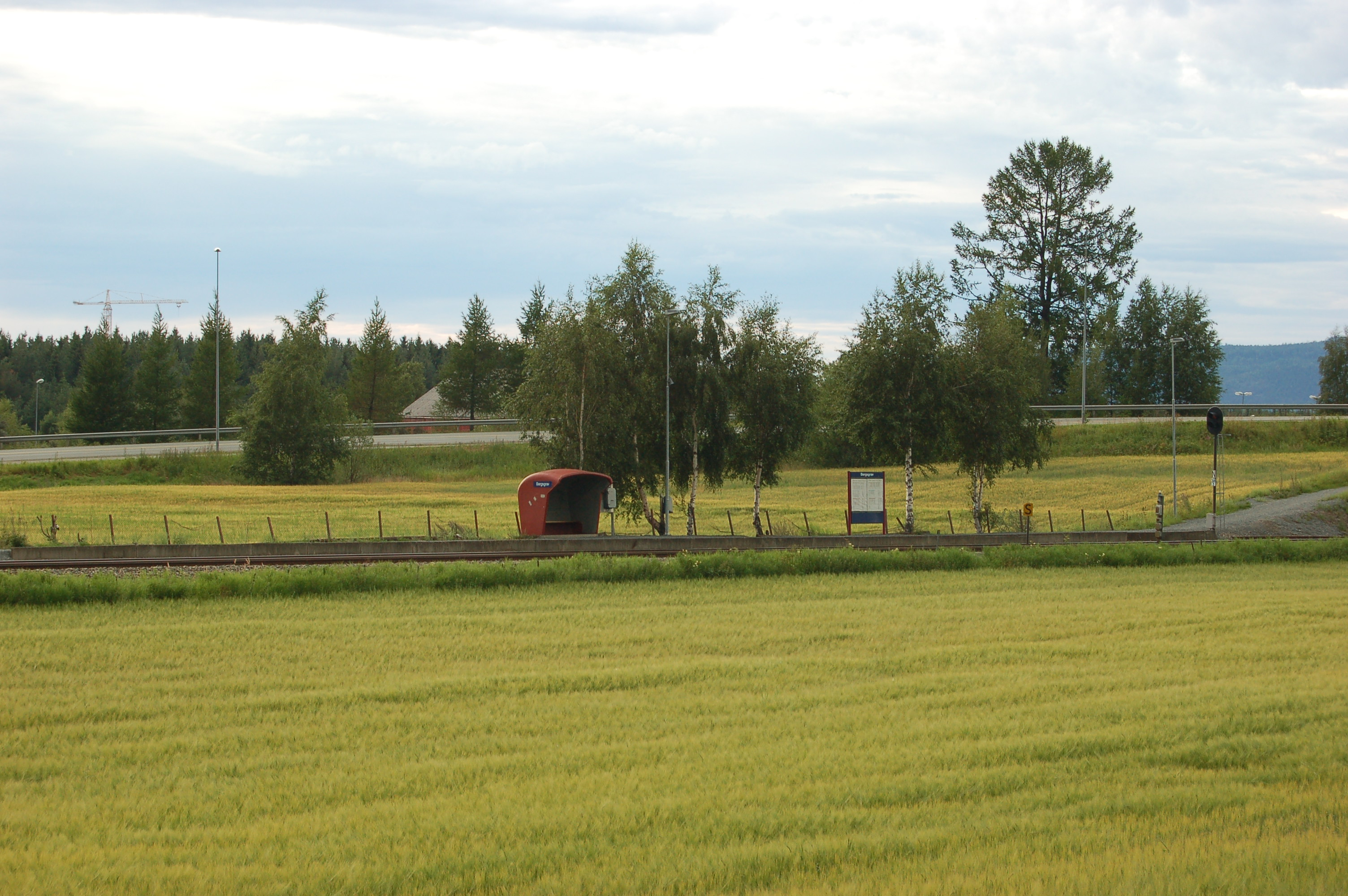
- View of the village train station
- Interactive map of Vinne
- Location within Trøndelag Location within Norway
- Coordinates: 63.7734°N 11.5278°E
- Country: Norway
- Region: Central Norway
- County: Trøndelag
- District: Innherred
- Municipality: Verdal Municipality
- Elevation: 41 m (135 ft)
- Time zone: UTC+01:00 (CET)
  - Summer (DST): UTC+02:00 (CEST)
- Post Code: 7657 Verdal

Vinne is a village in Verdal Municipality in Trøndelag county, Norway. It is located just south of the Verdalselva river, about 4 kilometres (2.5 mi) southeast of the town of Verdalsøra and about the same distance to the west of the village of Lysthaugen.

Vinne is also a Church of Norway parish covering the southern part of western Verdal Municipality, with Vinne Church located in this village.

The Bergsgrav Station is a train stop in Vinne along the Nordlandsbanen railway line.
