= Occitan cross =

Heraldic cross and motif

The Occitan cross (Occitan: crotz occitana [ˈkɾuts utsiˈtanɔ]), also called cross of Occitania (crotz d'Occitània), cross of Languedoc (crotz de Lengadòc) or cross of Toulouse (crotz de Tolosa), (Note: After the coat of arms of the counts of Toulouse.) heraldically "cross cleché, pommettée and voided", is a heraldic cross, today chiefly used as a symbol of Occitania. In the Chanson de la Croisade Albigeoise, it goes by the name of "Raymondine cross" (crotz ramondenca or ramondina).

The design was probably first used in the coat of arms of the counts of Forcalquier (in modern Provence), in the 12th century, and by the counts of Toulouse in their capacity as Marquises of Provence, on 13th century coins and seals. It later spread to the other provinces of Occitania, namely Provence, Guyenne, Gascony, Dauphiné, Auvergne and Limousin.

A yellow Occitan cross on a blood-red background with the seven-armed golden star of the Felibritge makes up the flag of modern-day Occitania. It can also be found in the emblems of Midi-Pyrénées, Languedoc-Roussillon (now both part of the administrative region of Occitania, which also features the cross in its symbols) and Hautes-Alpes, among many others, as well as in cemeteries and at country crossroads.

The blazon of the modern emblem is "gules, a cross cleché/pattée pommettée voided" or "in a red field, a gold cross with keys/paws/spheres/apples, in outline" (Occitan: de golas a la crotz voidada, clechada/patèa e pometada d'aur), also described as "cross pattée botonnée", "cross pommettée", "cross toulouse", or "cross fleury voided/in skeleton".

== History ==
Coat of arms of the counts of Toulouse as of the early 16th century.

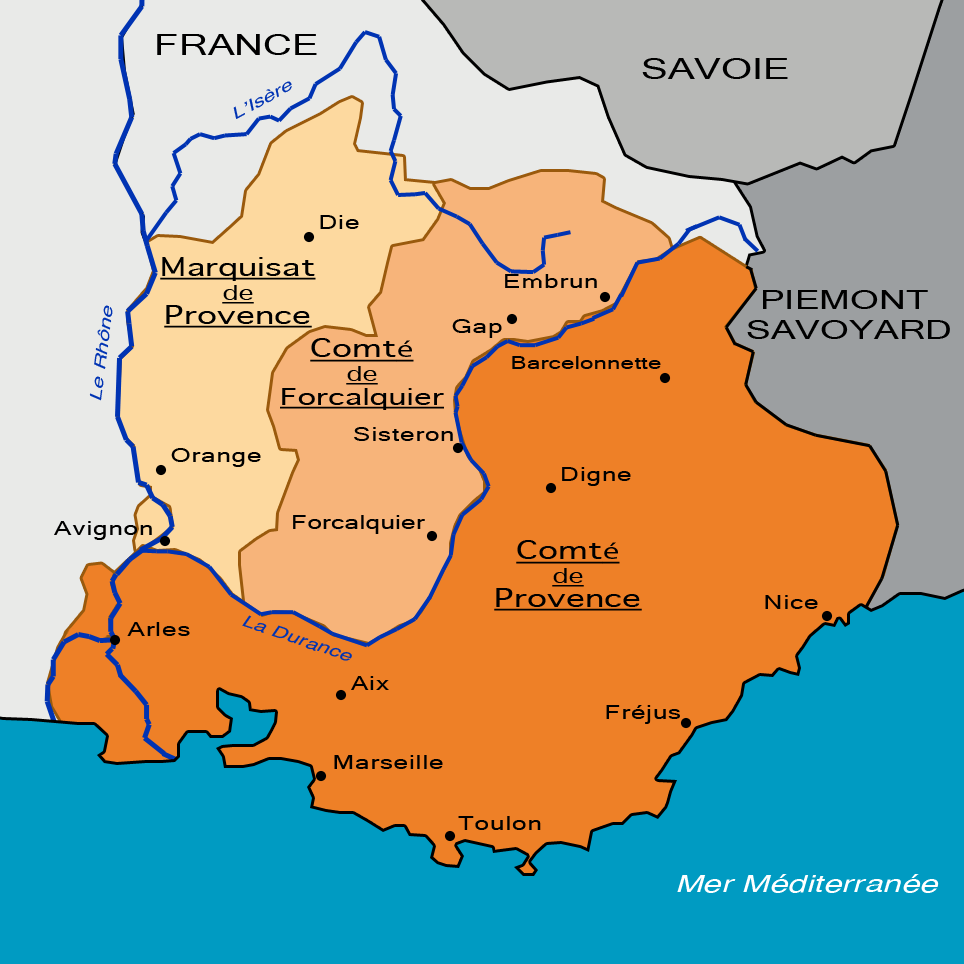
12th century division of Provence into the county of Provence, county of Forcalquier and marquisat de Provence.

The Occitan cross probably first appears in the coat of arms of the counts of Forcalquier and then during the reign of Raymond V, count of Toulouse, as a particular description of his official seal dated from 1165 corroborates. It soon spreads across the whole south-western part of today's France and is even spotted in various towns up north throughout the 12th century. Several interpretations have been proposed for the cross, often stressing the symbolic side of it and leaving aside the fact that "heraldry is not a science of symbols, but one of emblems" (M. Pastoureau).

In 1950, Henri Rolland suggested that the origin of the Occitan cross be traced back to the marquisate of Provence, north of the Durance, more precisely the town of Venasque.

In 1966, in the L'Auta review, Roger Camboulives voices his idea that the Occitan cross derives from a sun cross and perhaps the Nestorian cross found in China's Turkestan. It would have arrived in Toulouse via northern Italy and Provence, probably sometime in the 10th century. Camboulives in 1980 again emphasizes the role played by the Visigoths in the presence of small spheres at the end of the arms of the cross: they could represent the twelve houses of the zodiac.

In 1986, Jean-Yves Royer (in Le Pays de Forcalquier) claims that the cross was originally from Provence but admits that Henri Rolland's theory was flawed and built around wrong dates. Royer concludes that Rolland possibly mistook the Occitan cross with that of Forcalquier. He draws evidence most notably from two crosses carved in the lid of a sarcophagus found in the small Alpes-de-Haute-Provence commune of Ganagobie.

Air Toulouse adopted the Occitan cross as trademark until the mid-1990s.

Pierre Saliès in 1994 once again maintains that the cross is from Toulouse and is the fruit of successive local evolutions, possibly from the Jerusalem cross.

Two years after, in L'Auta (#612), Jean Rocacher confirms that the Occitan cross "is first the own emblem of the old county of Venasque, later torn between the houses of Toulouse and Forcalquier."

In 2000, Laurent Macé (in Les Comtes de Toulouse et leur entourage) claims that the Occitan cross became the counts' emblem after Raymond IV took part in the First Crusade. It would originate from Constantinople. Macé indicates that its pattern was first found in the Byzantine area and spread across Western Europe through Italy and Provence. The crosses of Venasque and Forcalquier would thus share the same origin, though one was not inspired by the other.

Later in the same year, Bertran de la Farge (in La Croix occitane) locates the original Occitan cross somewhere in the marquisate of Provence, probably Venasque. He argues it could be a mixture of the Constantinople cross and the Coptic cross, which was brought to Provence by monks and maybe also through Saint Maurice.

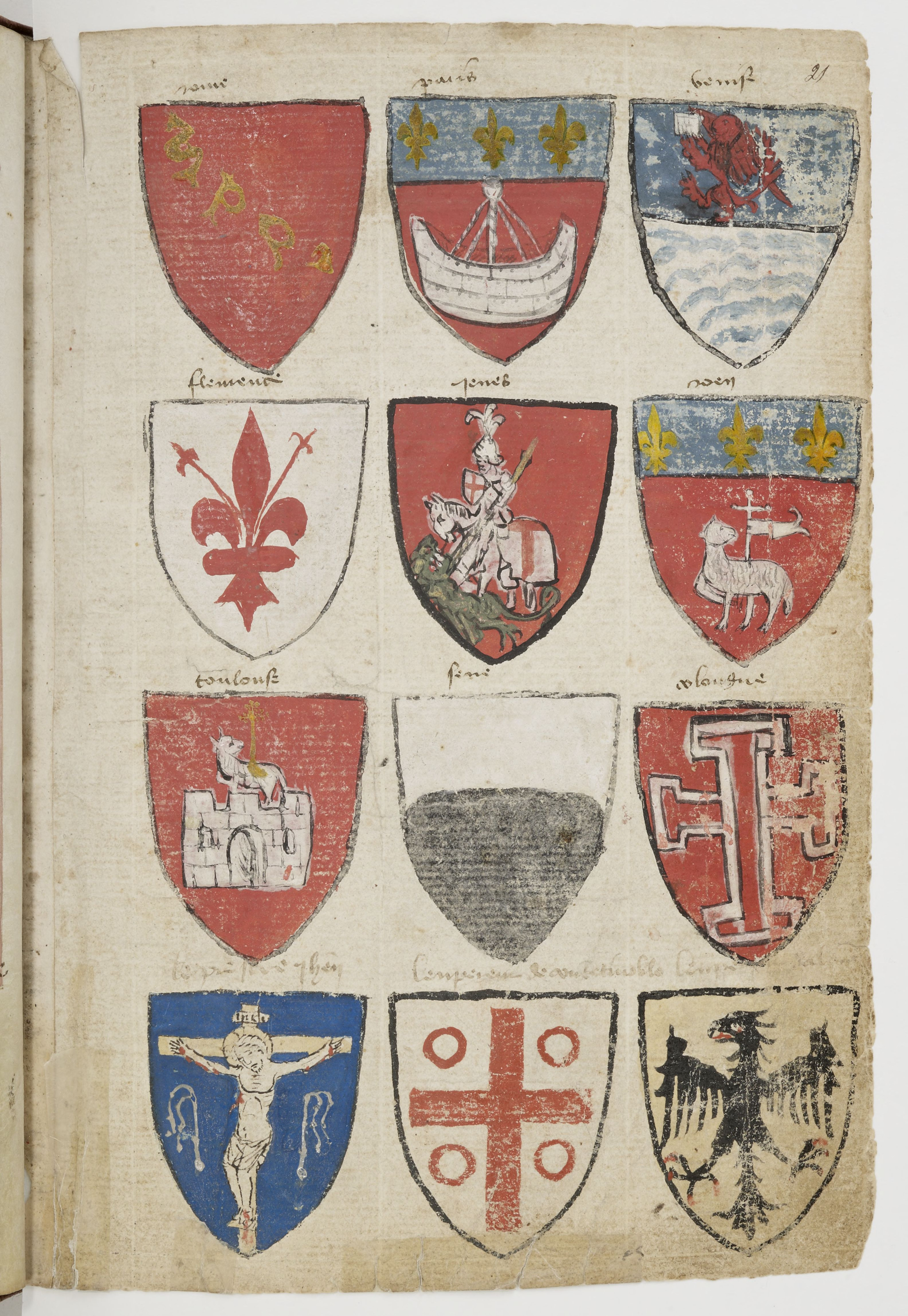
15th-century depiction of the arms of Toulouse as a voided cross potent.

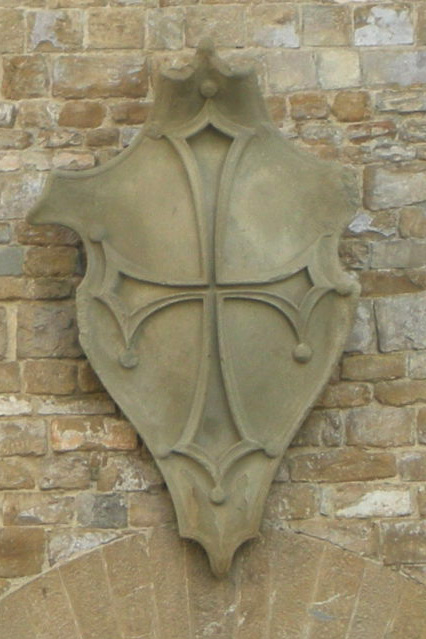
Late medieval depiction as the coat of arms of the Mozzi family of Florence, in Palazzo Mozzi.

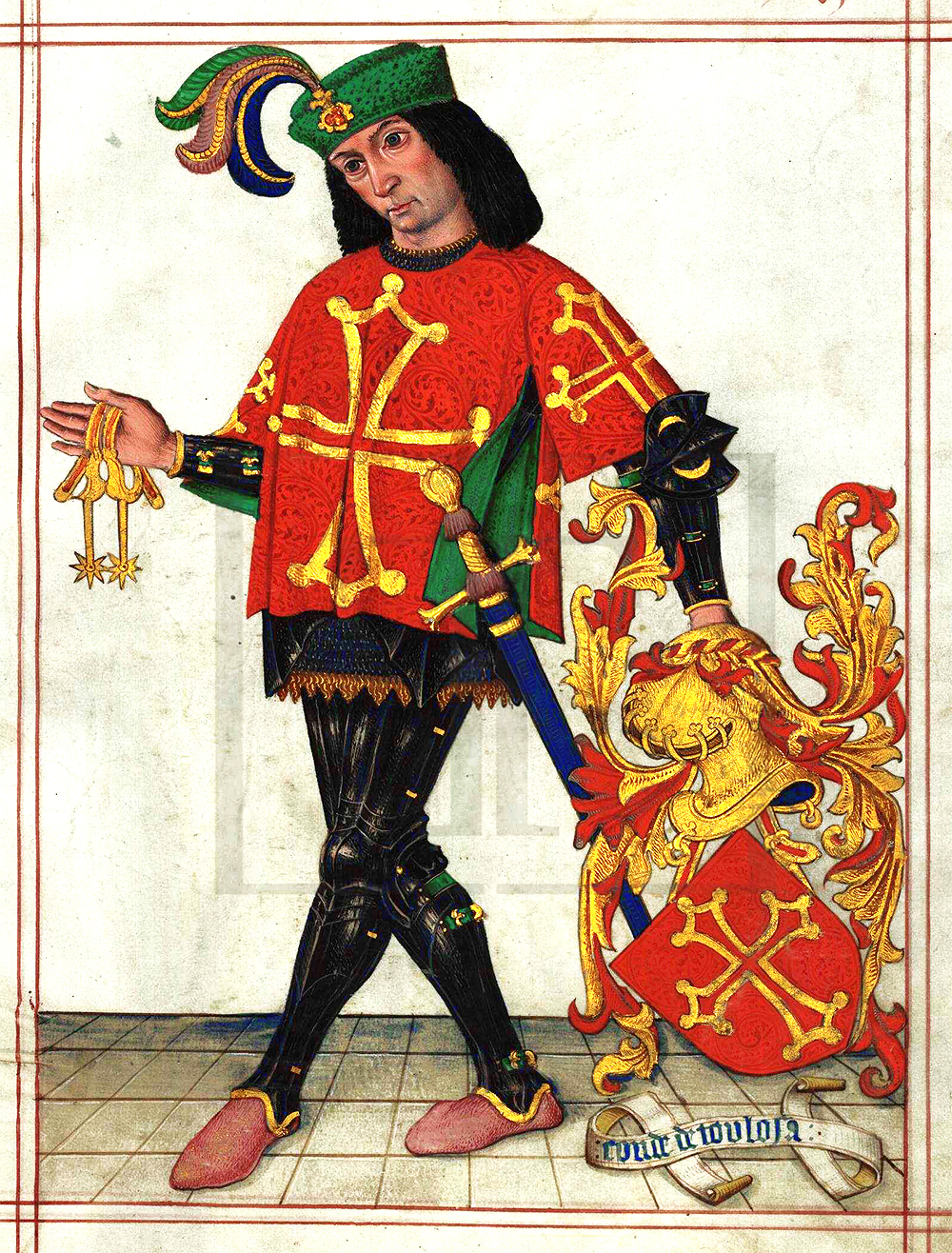
Arms of the count of Toulouse (1509)

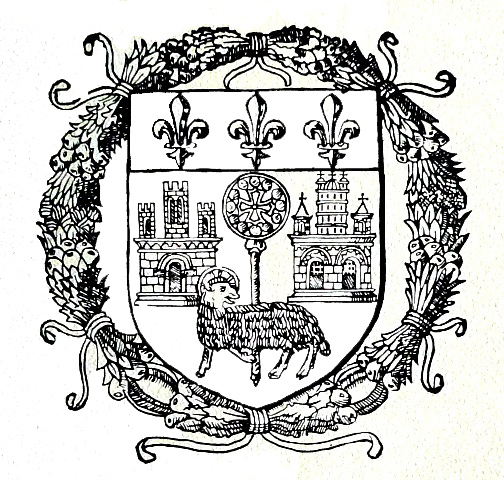
In the Toulouse city arms (1515)

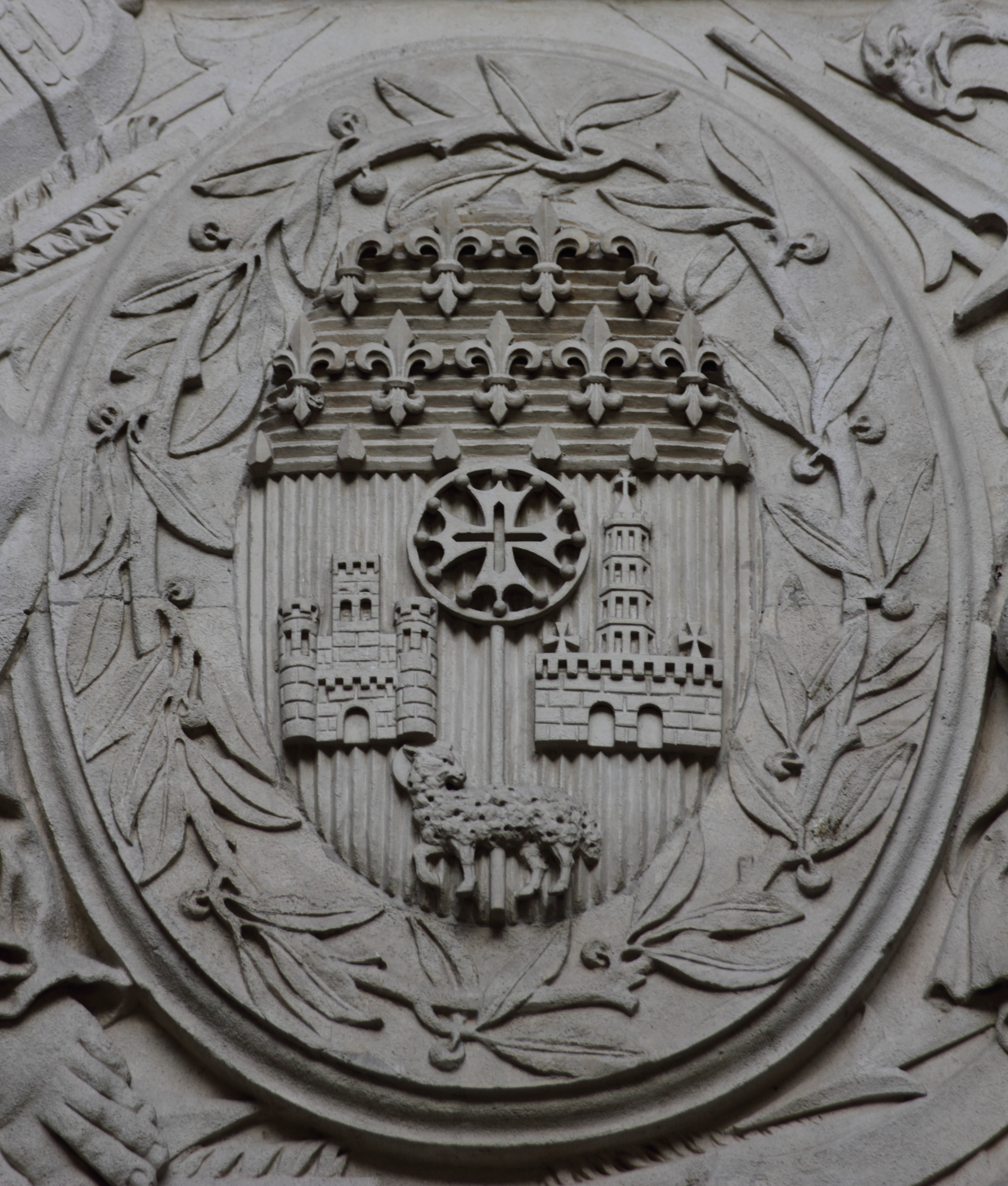
Toulouse arms from the time of Henry IV of France (r. 1572–1610)

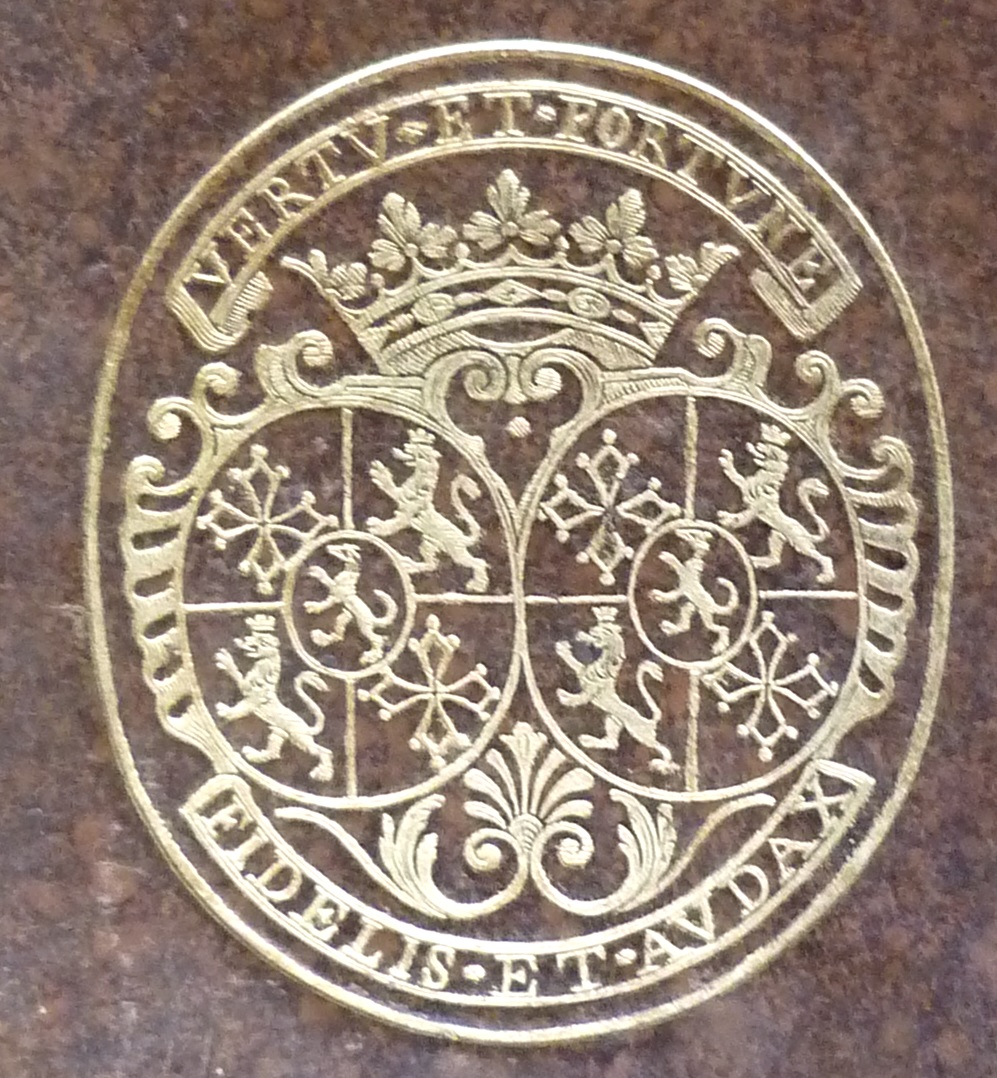
18th-century depiction in the coat of arms of Marguerite-Delphine de Valbelle, lady of Tourves (d.- 1784), as part of the Valbelle family coat of arms.

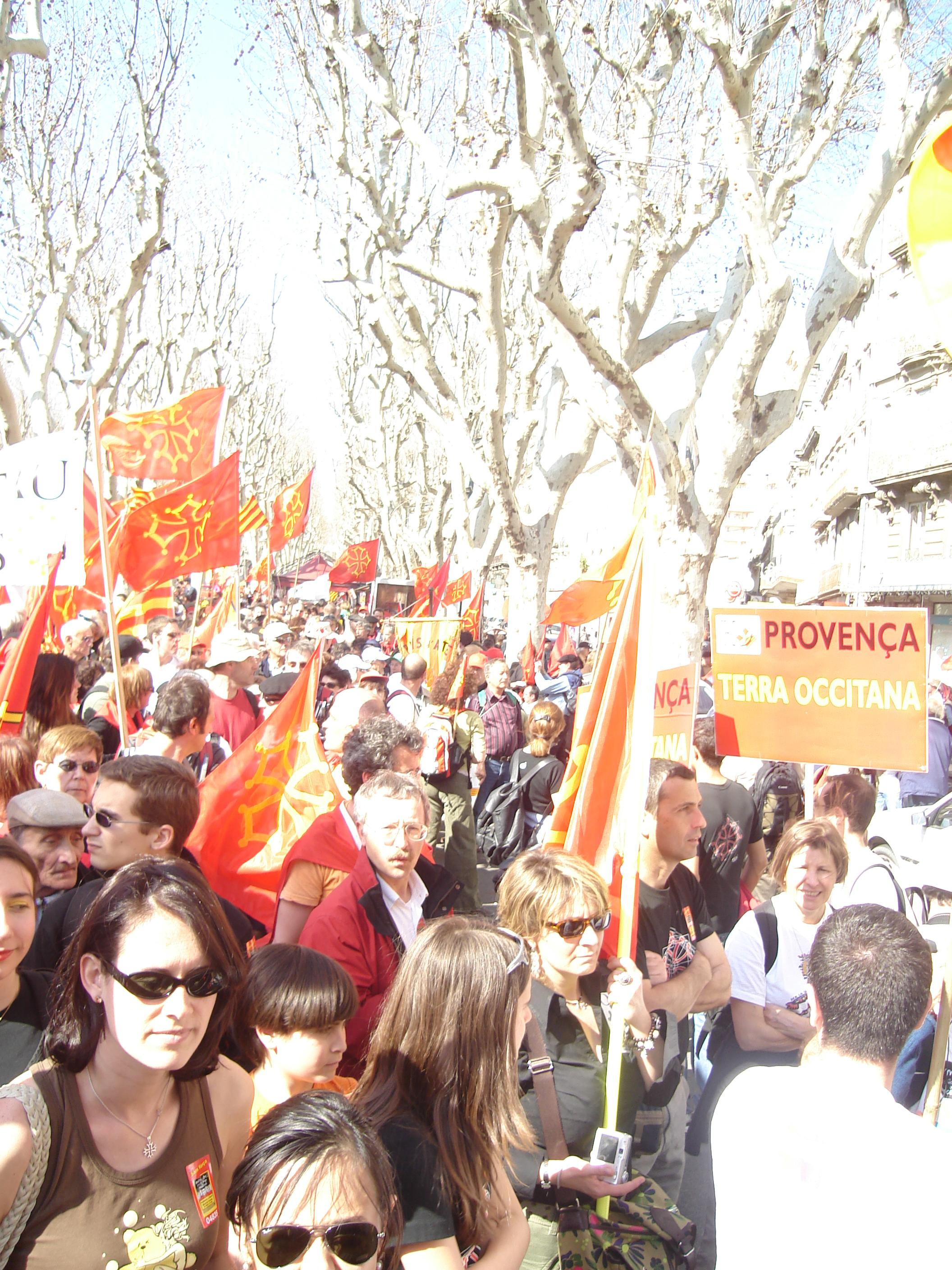
A demonstration for Occitania and the Occitan language in Béziers on March 17, 2007

== Modern uses ==
The modern Occitan cross on the flag of Occitania

Flag of Occitania, an adminsitrative region of France

The Occitan cross can be found on a number of flags, coats of arms, emblems and logos. Here follows a non-exhaustive list of occurrences:

=== Regions and provinces ===
- Flag and emblem of Occitania
  - Flag of the former Languedoc-Roussillon
  - Flag and emblem of the former Midi-Pyrénées
- Flag of the Aran Valley

=== Départements ===
- Coat of arms of Aude and the General Council of Aude
- Coat of arms of Gard
- Coat of arms of Hautes-Alpes
- Coat of arms of Haute-Garonne
- Coat of arms of Hérault
- Coat of arms of Tarn
- Coat of arms of Tarn-et-Garonne

=== Cities and towns ===
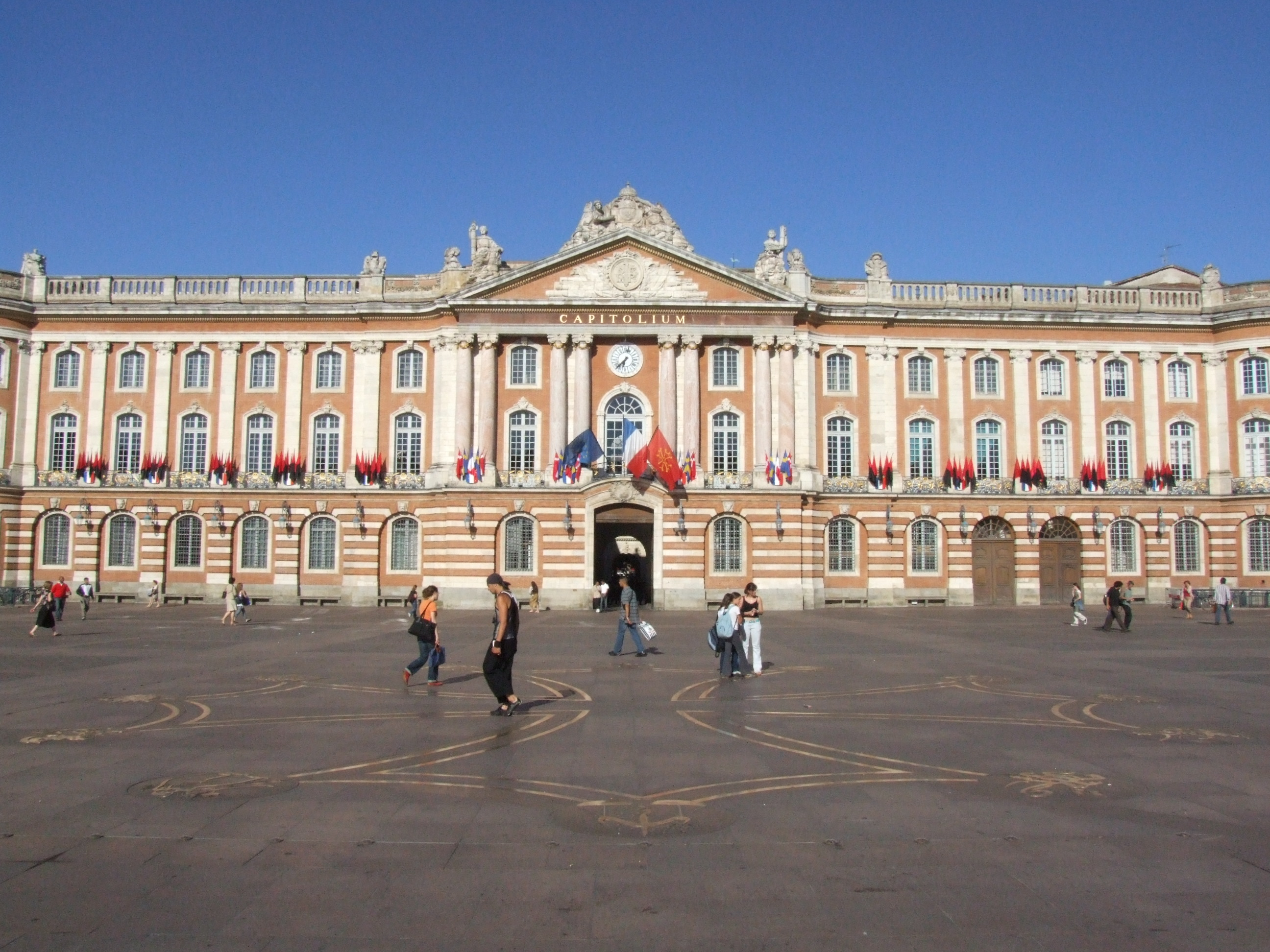
Plaça del Capitòli, Tolosa (Place du Capitole, Toulouse)

- Coat of arms of Ansignan
- Coat of arms of Buoux
- Coat of arms of Céreste
- Coat of arms of Colomiers
- Coat of arms of Fanjeaux
- Coat of arms of Gigondas
- Coat of arms of Laissac
- Coat of arms of Llupia
- Coat of arms of Méthamis
- Coat of arms of Moissac
- Coat of arms of Monclar (impaled)
- Coat of arms of Port-la-Nouvelle
- Coat of arms of Saint-Didier
- Coat of arms of Sévérac-le-Château
- Coat of arms of the City of Toulouse
- Coat of arms of Travaillan
- Coat of arms of Venasque
- Flag of Vianne
- Coat of arms of Villeneuve-d'Aveyron
- Coat of arms of Villefranche-de-Lauragais
- Coat of arms of Villefranche-de-Rouergue

=== Miscellaneous ===
- A prominent symbol on Lâg Guitars, particularly in their Tramontane series of acoustic guitars - Lag Guitars
- Logo of Toulouse FC
- Place du Capitole, Toulouse (43°36′16″N 1°26′36″E)
- Coat of arms of La Tour d'Auvergne
- Street signs in Toulouse
- Roadsigns in Limousin
- Sign of the Conseil Interprofessionnel des Vins du Languedoc

== See also ==
- Cercelée
- Cross of Camargue
- Pisan cross, a similar figure

== Sources ==
- Les Comtes de Toulouse et leur entourage: Rivalités, alliances et jeux de pouvoir XIIe-XIIIe siècles by Laurent Macé (éd. Privat)
- La Croix occitane by Bertran de la Farge (éd. Loubatières)
- Le Pays de Forcalquier by Jean-Yves Royer (éd. Équinoxe)
