= Verdal Municipality =

Municipality in Trøndelag, Norway

Verdal Municipality Verdal kommune
- Municipality
- Værdalen herred (historic name)
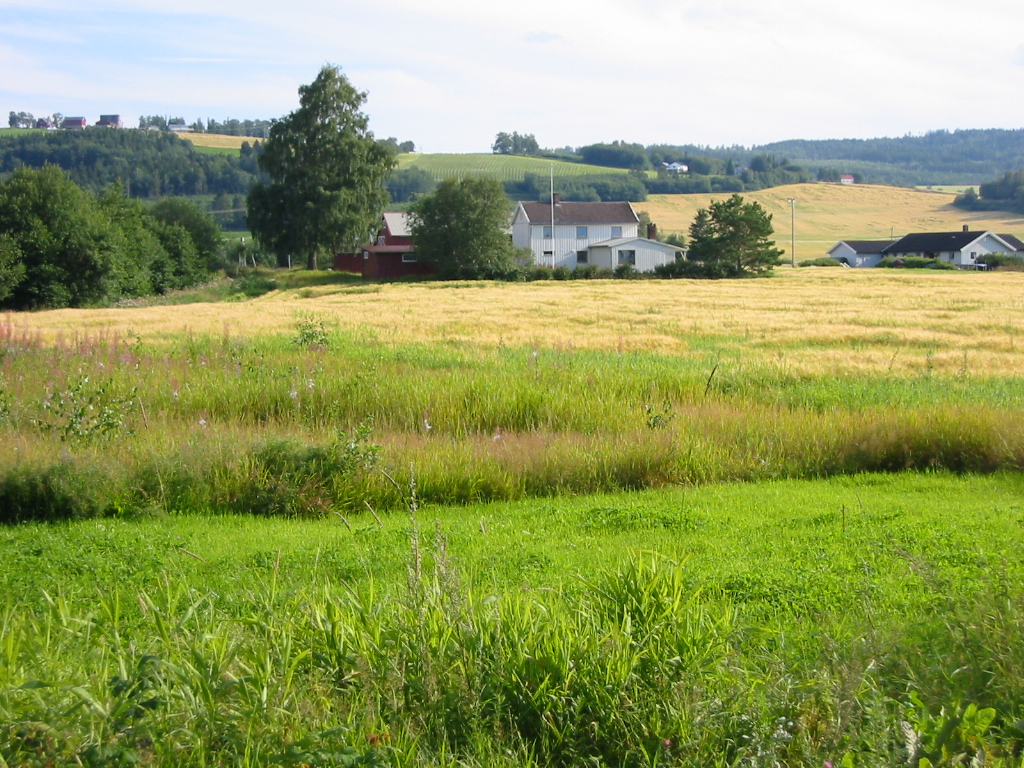

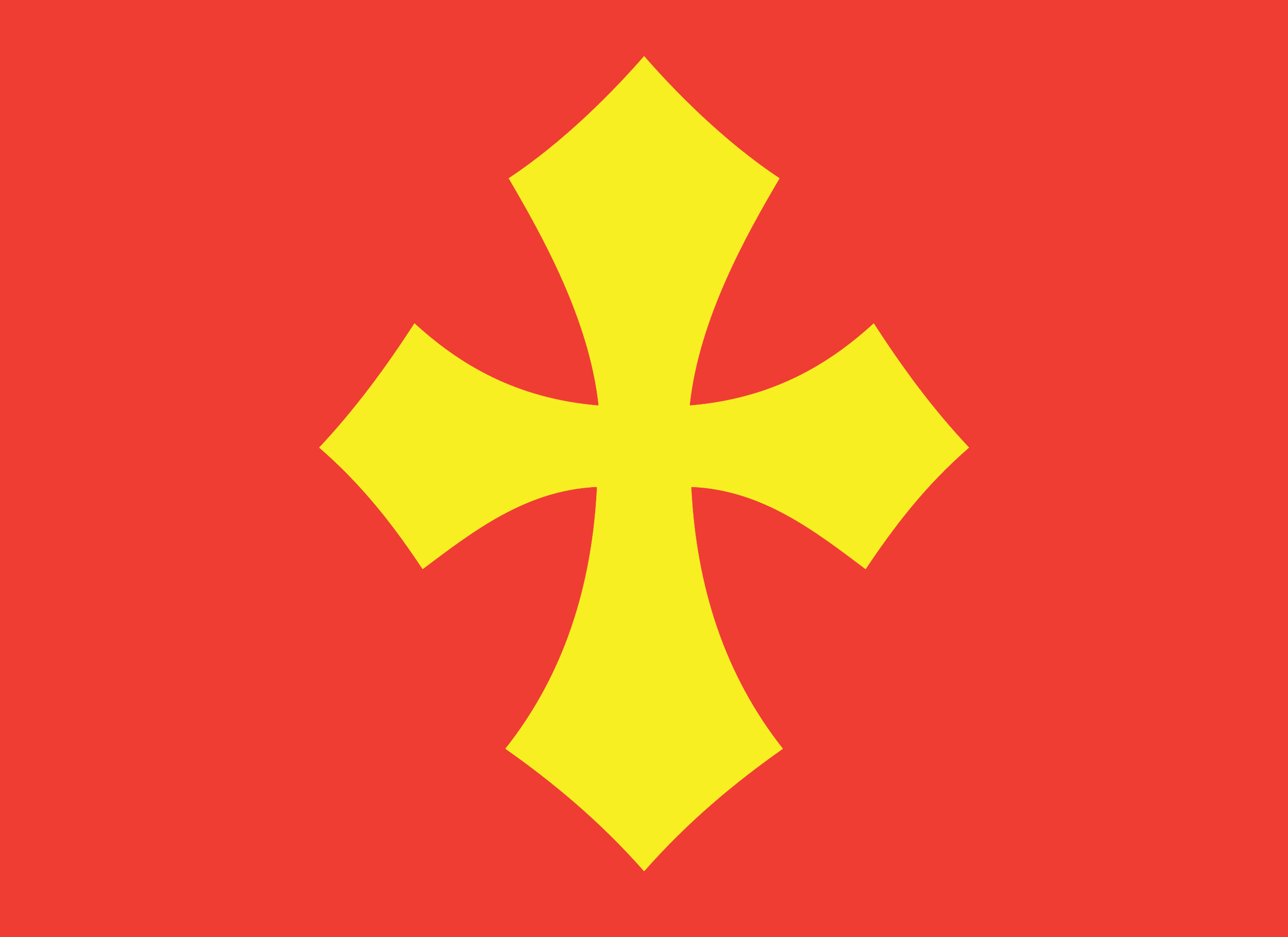
- Flag Coat of arms

- Trøndelag within Norway

- Verdal within Trøndelag
- Coordinates: 63°47′53″N 11°56′57″E
- Country: Norway
- County: Trøndelag
- District: Innherad
- Established: 1 Jan 1838
  - Created as: Formannskapsdistrikt
- Administrative centre: Verdalsøra

Government
  - Mayor (2023): Knut Snorre Sandnes (H)

Area
  - Total: 1,547.81 km^{2} (597.61 sq mi)
  - Land: 1,474.91 km^{2} (569.47 sq mi)
  - Water: 72.90 km^{2} (28.15 sq mi) 4.7%
  - Rank: #53 in Norway
- Highest elevation: 1,089.97 m (3,576.0 ft)

Population (2024)
  - Total: 15,193
  - Rank: #81 in Norway
  - Density: 9.8/km^{2} (25/sq mi)
  - Change (10 years): ▲ +2.7%
- Demonym: Verdaling

Official language
  - Norwegian form: Neutral
- Time zone: UTC+01:00 (CET)
  - Summer (DST): UTC+02:00 (CEST)
- ISO 3166 code: NO-5038
- Website: Official website

Verdal is a municipality in Trøndelag county, Norway. It is part of the Innherad region. The administrative centre of the municipality is the town of Verdalsøra. Some villages in the municipality include Forbregd/Lein, Lysthaugen, Stiklestad, Trones, Vera, Vinne, and Vuku.

The 1,548-square-kilometre (598 sq mi) municipality is the 53rd largest by area out of the 357 municipalities in Norway. Verdal Municipality is the 81st most populous municipality in Norway with a population of 15,193. The municipality's population density is 9.8 inhabitants per square kilometre (25/sq mi) and its population has increased by 2.7% over the previous 10-year period.

== General information ==
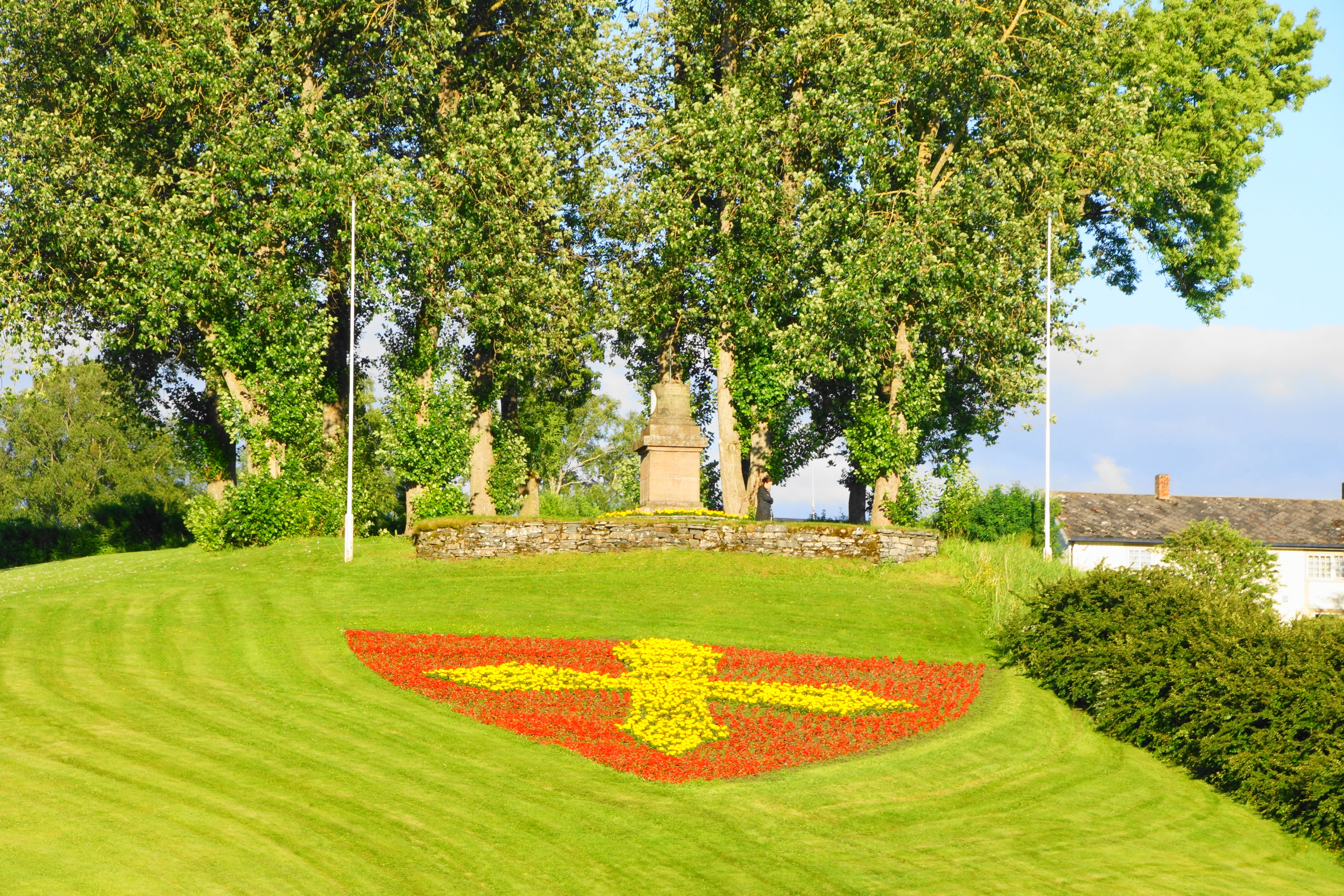
Flowers forming the coat of arms

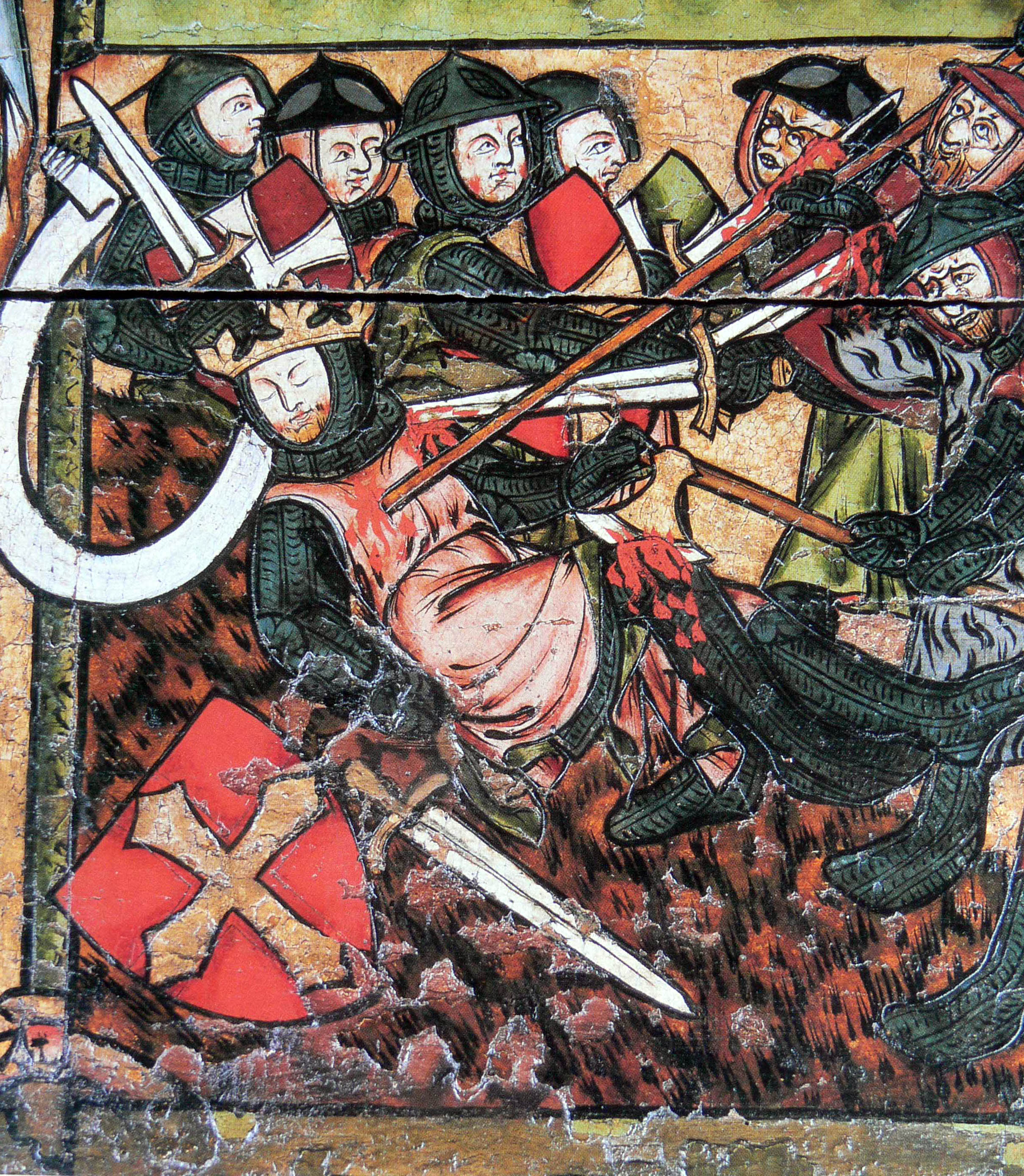
The painting of Olaf II's death at the Battle of Stiklestad (dated from the first half of the 14th century), which inspired the municipal coat of arms.

The municipality of Værdalen was established on 1 January 1838 (see formannskapsdistrikt law). It is one of very few municipalities in Norway with unchanged borders since that date, although the spelling of the name was modified to Verdal. On 1 January 2018, the municipality switched from the old Nord-Trøndelag county to the new Trøndelag county.

=== Name ===
The municipality (originally the parish) is named after the Verdalen valley (Old Norse: Veradalr). The first element is the genitive case of the river name Ver (now called Verdalselva). The meaning of the river name is probably "the quiet one". The last element is dalr which means "valley" or "dale". Historically, the name of the municipality was spelled Værdalen. On 3 November 1917, a royal resolution changed the spelling of the name of the municipality to Verdal, removing the definite form ending -en.

=== Coat of arms ===
The coat of arms was granted on 15 December 1972. The official blazon is "Gules, a cross cleché Or" (Norwegian: På rød bunn et gull kors, utbøyd og tilspisset). This means the arms have a red field (background) and the charge is a cross with a cleché design. The cross has a tincture of Or which means it is commonly colored yellow, but if it is made out of metal, then gold is used. The design is based on a cross shown in a large painting in the Nidaros Cathedral in Trondheim, in which the death of King Olav Haraldsson (Saint Olaf) is shown. He died in the Battle of Stiklestad, the site of which is in Verdal municipality. In the painting, he holds a shield with this cross design. To commemorate the battle, the cross was taken as arms for the municipality. The arms were designed by Hallvard Trætteberg. The municipal flag has the same design as the coat of arms.

=== Churches ===
The Church of Norway has four parishes (sokn) within Verdal Municipality. It is part of the Sør-Innherad prosti (deanery) in the Diocese of Nidaros.

Churches in Verdal Municipality
Parish (sokn)	Church name	Location of the church	Year built
Stiklestad	Stiklestad Church	Stiklestad	1180
Stiklestad	Verdalsøra Chapel	Verdalsøra	1969
Vera	Vera Chapel	Vera	1899
Vinne	Vinne Church	Vinne	1817
Vuku	Vuku Church	Vuku	1655

== History ==
=== Battle of Stiklestad ===
The most famous battle in Norwegian history, the Battle of Stiklestad, took place at Stiklestad in Verdal in the year 1030. The Stiklestad Church was built afterwards at the place where King Olav Haraldsson, later redesigned as St. Olaf, died during the battle. Olavsstøtta, a memorial pillar dedicated to St. Olaf, was erected in 1807 to commemorate the Battle of Stiklestad.

=== Verdalsraset ===
Early on the night of 19 May 1893, the most deadly landslide in modern Norwegian history, known as Verdalsraset, took place in Verdal. It killed 116 people and at least 500 animals when approximately 100 farms were swept away. A wet winter and several spring floods in the river made the quick clay under the topsoil in a large area of the valley turn into a fluid. The slide moved about 60,000,000 m^{3} (78,000,000 yd^{3}) of clay, completely reshaping the topography of the area, including moving the course of the river.

== Culture ==
=== Råning ===
This culture is known for young people interested in cars, spending most of their time improving, enhancing, and styling their cars, and then driving them for display on a particular route around the town centre. This is not only positive, as they do show some general disregard for common laws and regulations. People living in the town center are at times bothered by noise, usually music being played at high volumes from their cars.

=== Stiklestad ===
Verdal is the location of the Stiklestad National Cultural Centre. The Saint Olav Drama appears here on an open stage every year in July. The play centers on events leading up to the Battle of Stiklestad.

== Geography ==
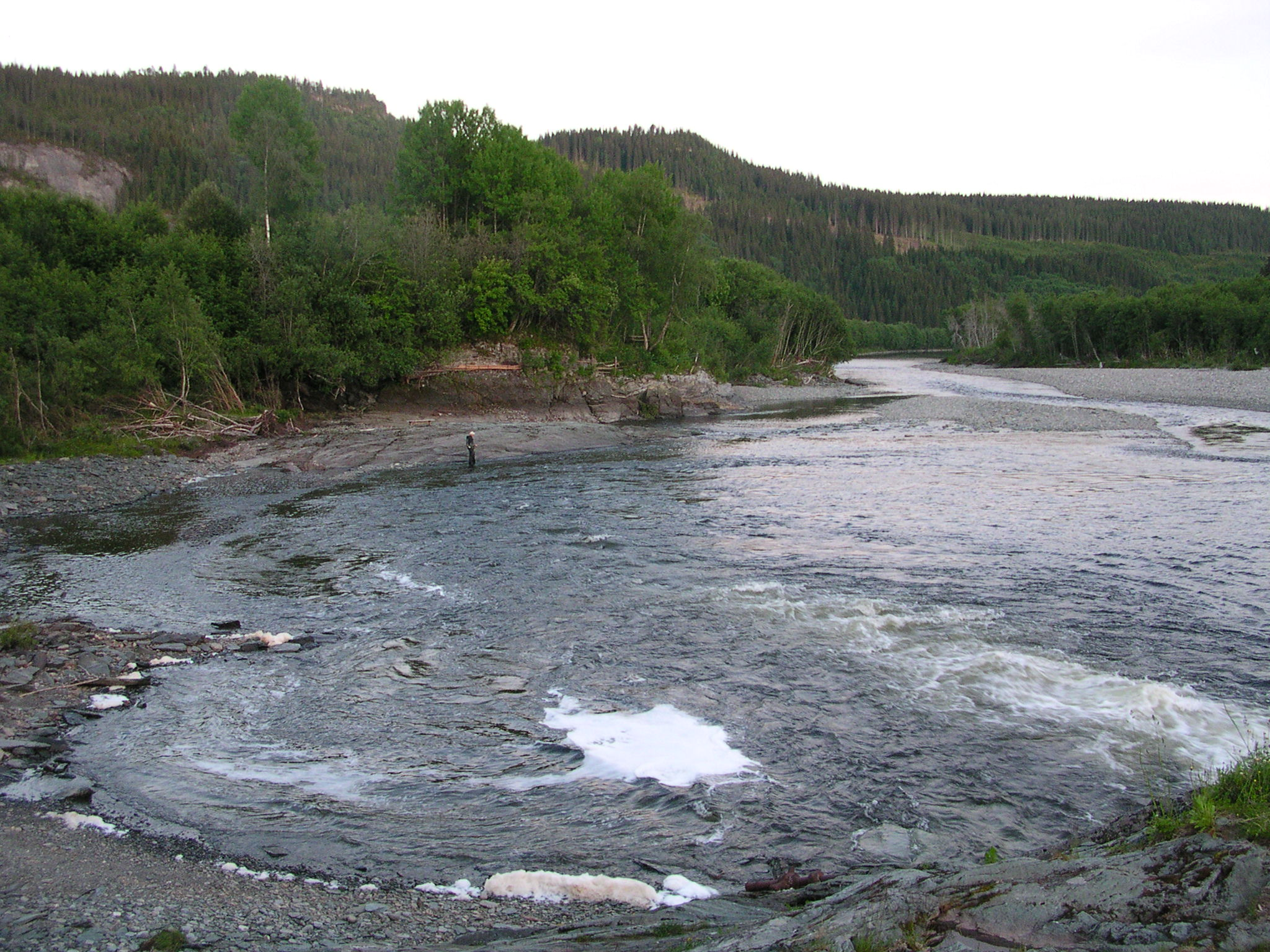
Part of the Verdal river (Verdalselva).

Verdal Municipality is centered on the Verdalen valley. The river Verdalselva runs through the valley into the Trondheimsfjord at Verdalsøra. The rivers Helgåa and Inna join at the village of Vuku to form the Verdalselva. The lake Veresvatnet flows into the river Helgåa and the lake Innsvatnet flows into the river Inna. The large lake Leksdalsvatnet lies on the border of Verdal Municipality and Steinkjer Municipality. The southern tip of the large Blåfjella–Skjækerfjella National Park lies in the northeastern part of Verdal. Rinnleiret is a beach area along the border with Levanger Municipality in the west. The highest point in the municipality is the 1,089.97-metre (3,576.0 ft) tall mountain Løysmundhatten, on the border with Snåsa Municipality.

== Climate ==
Verdal Municipality is situated along the innermost part of Trondheimsfjord and has a humid continental climate (Dfb) with mild winters for this climate. Using the −3 °C (27 °F) winter threshold as in the original Köppen climate classification, Verdal has an oceanic climate (Cfb). The all-time high 33 °C (91 °F) was recorded in July 2018. The all-time low −26.4 °C (−16 °F) was set in January 1987. The average date for first overnight freeze (below 0 °C (32 °F)) in autumn is October 6 (1981-2010 average).

Climate data for Verdal - Reppe 1991–2020 (81 m, extremes 1971-2018 includes earlier stations)
Month	Jan	Feb	Mar	Apr	May	Jun	Jul	Aug	Sep	Oct	Nov	Dec	Year
Record high °C (°F)	12 (54)	12.5 (54.5)	14.7 (58.5)	20.1 (68.2)	28.6 (83.5)	29.8 (85.6)	33 (91)	30.4 (86.7)	27 (81)	22.5 (72.5)	15.8 (60.4)	12.9 (55.2)	33 (91)
Mean daily maximum °C (°F)	0.6 (33.1)	0.7 (33.3)	3.7 (38.7)	8.7 (47.7)	13.9 (57.0)	17 (63)	20.4 (68.7)	19.3 (66.7)	14.8 (58.6)	8.7 (47.7)	3.7 (38.7)	1.4 (34.5)	9.4 (49.0)
Daily mean °C (°F)	−2 (28)	−2.2 (28.0)	−0.3 (31.5)	3.9 (39.0)	8.5 (47.3)	12.2 (54.0)	15 (59)	14.3 (57.7)	10.2 (50.4)	5 (41)	1.2 (34.2)	−1.1 (30.0)	5.4 (41.7)
Mean daily minimum °C (°F)	−4.9 (23.2)	−4.8 (23.4)	−3 (27)	0.8 (33.4)	4.8 (40.6)	8.2 (46.8)	11.2 (52.2)	10.7 (51.3)	7.6 (45.7)	3.1 (37.6)	−1.2 (29.8)	−4.1 (24.6)	2.4 (36.3)
Record low °C (°F)	−26.4 (−15.5)	−25.4 (−13.7)	−20.5 (−4.9)	−14.7 (5.5)	−4 (25)	−1.2 (29.8)	1.8 (35.2)	0.2 (32.4)	−3.1 (26.4)	−8.8 (16.2)	−18.7 (−1.7)	−23 (−9)	−26.4 (−15.5)
Average precipitation mm (inches)	66 (2.6)	65 (2.6)	62 (2.4)	44 (1.7)	53 (2.1)	92 (3.6)	95 (3.7)	99 (3.9)	97 (3.8)	86 (3.4)	74 (2.9)	86 (3.4)	919 (36.1)
Source 1: Norwegian Meteorological Institute
Source 2: NOAA - WMO averages 91-2020 Norway

== Government ==
Verdal Municipality is responsible for primary education (through 10th grade), outpatient health services, senior citizen services, welfare and other social services, zoning, economic development, and municipal roads and utilities. The municipality is governed by a municipal council of directly elected representatives. The mayor is indirectly elected by a vote of the municipal council. The municipality is under the jurisdiction of the Trøndelag District Court and the Frostating Court of Appeal.

Verdal's waste management has since 1985 been carried out by the intermunicipal Innherred Renovasjon. They operate a major facility at Skjørdalen, previously a landfill, and since 2008 the biogas manufacturing plant Ecopro. Since 2018, waste collection has been operated by ReTrans Midt.

=== Municipal council ===
The municipal council (Kommunestyre) of Verdal Municipality is made up of 35 representatives that are elected to four-year terms. The tables below show the current and historical composition of the council by political party.

Verdal kommunestyre 2023–2027
Party name (in Norwegian)	Number of representatives
Labour Party (Arbeiderpartiet)	10
Progress Party (Fremskrittspartiet)	2
Conservative Party (Høyre)	7
Industry and Business Party (Industri‑ og Næringspartiet)	1
Red Party (Rødt)	1
Centre Party (Senterpartiet)	7
Socialist Left Party (Sosialistisk Venstreparti)	1
Liberal Party (Venstre)	1
Verdal List (Verdalslista)	5
Total number of members:	35

Verdal kommunestyre 2019–2023
Party name (in Norwegian)	Number of representatives
Labour Party (Arbeiderpartiet)	10
Progress Party (Fremskrittspartiet)	1
Green Party (Miljøpartiet De Grønne)	1
Conservative Party (Høyre)	3
Red Party (Rødt)	1
Centre Party (Senterpartiet)	18
Socialist Left Party (Sosialistisk Venstreparti)	1
Total number of members:	35

Verdal kommunestyre 2015–2019
Party name (in Norwegian)	Number of representatives
Labour Party (Arbeiderpartiet)	15
Progress Party (Fremskrittspartiet)	2
Green Party (Miljøpartiet De Grønne)	1
Conservative Party (Høyre)	3
Christian Democratic Party (Kristelig Folkeparti)	1
Centre Party (Senterpartiet)	11
Socialist Left Party (Sosialistisk Venstreparti)	1
Liberal Party (Venstre)	1
Total number of members:	35

Verdal kommunestyre 2011–2015
Party name (in Norwegian)	Number of representatives
Labour Party (Arbeiderpartiet)	17
Progress Party (Fremskrittspartiet)	3
Conservative Party (Høyre)	4
Christian Democratic Party (Kristelig Folkeparti)	1
Centre Party (Senterpartiet)	7
Socialist Left Party (Sosialistisk Venstreparti)	1
Liberal Party (Venstre)	2
Total number of members:	35

Verdal kommunestyre 2007–2011
Party name (in Norwegian)	Number of representatives
Labour Party (Arbeiderpartiet)	17
Progress Party (Fremskrittspartiet)	5
Conservative Party (Høyre)	2
Christian Democratic Party (Kristelig Folkeparti)	1
Centre Party (Senterpartiet)	6
Socialist Left Party (Sosialistisk Venstreparti)	2
Liberal Party (Venstre)	2
Total number of members:	35

Verdal kommunestyre 2003–2007
Party name (in Norwegian)	Number of representatives
Labour Party (Arbeiderpartiet)	16
Progress Party (Fremskrittspartiet)	5
Conservative Party (Høyre)	2
Christian Democratic Party (Kristelig Folkeparti)	1
Centre Party (Senterpartiet)	6
Socialist Left Party (Sosialistisk Venstreparti)	4
Liberal Party (Venstre)	1
Total number of members:	35

Verdal kommunestyre 1999–2003
Party name (in Norwegian)	Number of representatives
Labour Party (Arbeiderpartiet)	23
Progress Party (Fremskrittspartiet)	4
Conservative Party (Høyre)	3
Christian Democratic Party (Kristelig Folkeparti)	2
Centre Party (Senterpartiet)	8
Socialist Left Party (Sosialistisk Venstreparti)	3
Liberal Party (Venstre)	2
Total number of members:	45

Verdal kommunestyre 1995–1999
Party name (in Norwegian)	Number of representatives
Labour Party (Arbeiderpartiet)	20
Progress Party (Fremskrittspartiet)	2
Conservative Party (Høyre)	3
Christian Democratic Party (Kristelig Folkeparti)	1
Centre Party (Senterpartiet)	14
Socialist Left Party (Sosialistisk Venstreparti)	2
Liberal Party (Venstre)	2
Professional Political Association List (Faglig Politisk foreningsliste)	1
Total number of members:	45

Verdal kommunestyre 1991–1995
Party name (in Norwegian)	Number of representatives
Labour Party (Arbeiderpartiet)	19
Progress Party (Fremskrittspartiet)	1
Conservative Party (Høyre)	4
Christian Democratic Party (Kristelig Folkeparti)	1
Centre Party (Senterpartiet)	11
Socialist Left Party (Sosialistisk Venstreparti)	6
Liberal Party (Venstre)	2
Professional Political Association List (Faglig Politisk foreningsliste)	1
Total number of members:	45

Verdal kommunestyre 1987–1991
Party name (in Norwegian)	Number of representatives
Labour Party (Arbeiderpartiet)	21
Conservative Party (Høyre)	5
Christian Democratic Party (Kristelig Folkeparti)	1
Centre Party (Senterpartiet)	7
Socialist Left Party (Sosialistisk Venstreparti)	2
Liberal Party (Venstre)	4
Professional-politics list (Faglig-politisk liste)	5
Total number of members:	45

Verdal kommunestyre 1983–1987
Party name (in Norwegian)	Number of representatives
Labour Party (Arbeiderpartiet)	25
Conservative Party (Høyre)	5
Communist Party (Kommunistiske Parti)	1
Christian Democratic Party (Kristelig Folkeparti)	1
Centre Party (Senterpartiet)	7
Socialist Left Party (Sosialistisk Venstreparti)	2
Liberal Party (Venstre)	3
Joint list of Independent voters and Progress Party (Uavhengige velgere og Fremskrittspartiet)	1
Total number of members:	45

Verdal kommunestyre 1979–1983
Party name (in Norwegian)	Number of representatives
Labour Party (Arbeiderpartiet)	21
Progress Party (Fremskrittspartiet)	2
Conservative Party (Høyre)	5
Communist Party (Kommunistiske Parti)	1
Christian Democratic Party (Kristelig Folkeparti)	1
New People's Party (Nye Folkepartiet)	1
Centre Party (Senterpartiet)	9
Socialist Left Party (Sosialistisk Venstreparti)	1
Liberal Party (Venstre)	4
Total number of members:	45

Verdal kommunestyre 1975–1979
Party name (in Norwegian)	Number of representatives
Labour Party (Arbeiderpartiet)	20
Conservative Party (Høyre)	3
Christian Democratic Party (Kristelig Folkeparti)	2
New People's Party (Nye Folkepartiet)	3
Centre Party (Senterpartiet)	11
Socialist Left Party (Sosialistisk Venstreparti)	4
Liberal Party (Venstre)	2
Total number of members:	45

Verdal kommunestyre 1971–1975
Party name (in Norwegian)	Number of representatives
Labour Party (Arbeiderpartiet)	18
Conservative Party (Høyre)	2
Christian Democratic Party (Kristelig Folkeparti)	2
Centre Party (Senterpartiet)	8
Liberal Party (Venstre)	3
Socialist common list (Venstresosialistiske felleslister)	4
Total number of members:	37

Verdal kommunestyre 1967–1971
Party name (in Norwegian)	Number of representatives
Labour Party (Arbeiderpartiet)	19
Conservative Party (Høyre)	2
Communist Party (Kommunistiske Parti)	2
Christian Democratic Party (Kristelig Folkeparti)	1
Centre Party (Senterpartiet)	8
Socialist People's Party (Sosialistisk Folkeparti)	1
Liberal Party (Venstre)	3
List of workers, fishermen, and small farmholders (Arbeidere, fiskere, småbrukere liste)	1
Total number of members:	37

Verdal kommunestyre 1963–1967
Party name (in Norwegian)	Number of representatives
Labour Party (Arbeiderpartiet)	21
Conservative Party (Høyre)	2
Communist Party (Kommunistiske Parti)	3
Christian Democratic Party (Kristelig Folkeparti)	2
Centre Party (Senterpartiet)	6
Liberal Party (Venstre)	2
List of workers, fishermen, and small farmholders (Arbeidere, fiskere, småbrukere liste)	1
Total number of members:	37

Verdal herredsstyre 1959–1963
Party name (in Norwegian)	Number of representatives
Labour Party (Arbeiderpartiet)	17
Conservative Party (Høyre)	2
Communist Party (Kommunistiske Parti)	4
Christian Democratic Party (Kristelig Folkeparti)	2
Centre Party (Senterpartiet)	7
Liberal Party (Venstre)	2
List of workers, fishermen, and small farmholders (Arbeidere, fiskere, småbrukere liste)	3
Total number of members:	37

Verdal herredsstyre 1955–1959
Party name (in Norwegian)	Number of representatives
Labour Party (Arbeiderpartiet)	19
Communist Party (Kommunistiske Parti)	4
Christian Democratic Party (Kristelig Folkeparti)	2
Farmers' Party (Bondepartiet)	7
Liberal Party (Venstre)	4
List of workers, fishermen, and small farmholders (Arbeidere, fiskere, småbrukere liste)	1
Total number of members:	37

Verdal herredsstyre 1951–1955
Party name (in Norwegian)	Number of representatives
Labour Party (Arbeiderpartiet)	18
Communist Party (Kommunistiske Parti)	5
Christian Democratic Party (Kristelig Folkeparti)	2
Farmers' Party (Bondepartiet)	7
Liberal Party (Venstre)	4
Total number of members:	36

Verdal herredsstyre 1947–1951
Party name (in Norwegian)	Number of representatives
Local List(s) (Lokale lister)	36
Total number of members:	36

Verdal herredsstyre 1945–1947
Party name (in Norwegian)	Number of representatives
Labour Party (Arbeiderpartiet)	18
Communist Party (Kommunistiske Parti)	6
Farmers' Party (Bondepartiet)	6
Liberal Party (Venstre)	5
Local List(s) (Lokale lister)	1
Total number of members:	36

Verdal herredsstyre 1937–1941*
Party name (in Norwegian)	Number of representatives
Labour Party (Arbeiderpartiet)	16
Communist Party (Kommunistiske Parti)	4
Farmers' Party (Bondepartiet)	7
Liberal Party (Venstre)	8
Local List(s) (Lokale lister)	1
Total number of members:	36
Note: Due to the German occupation of Norway during World War II, no elections were held for new municipal councils until after the war ended in 1945.

=== Mayors ===
The mayor (Norwegian: ordfører) of Verdal Municipality is the political leader of the municipality and the chairperson of the municipal council. Here is a list of people who have held this position:

- 1838–1839: Eliseus Müller
- 1840–1841: Lars Steen
- 1842–1843: Christian Munch von Holst
- 1844–1849: Johannes Groth Monrad
- 1850–1861: Ole Hage
- 1862–1863: Andreas Steen
- 1864–1871: Wilhelm Christian Holst
- 1872–1875: Martin Daniel Müller (H)
- 1876–1881: Anton Bendix Monrad
- 1882–1889: Peter Holst (V)
- 1890–1893: Andreas Tessem (V)
- 1893–1895: Martin Eggen (V)
- 1896–1901: Elling Reppe (V)
- 1902–1910: Ole Holan (V)
- 1911–1913: Bernhard Rostad (H)
- 1914–1916: Erik Veel (V)
- 1917–1919: Tommas Berg (V)
- 1920–1920: Ole Holan (V)
- 1921–1928: Tommas Berg (V)
- 1929–1934: Eliseus Müller (Bp)
- 1935–1939: Andreas Haugan (Ap)
- 1939–1940: Christian Nevermo (Ap)
- 1941–1945: Arne Vold (NS)
- 1945–1945: Georg Tromsdal (Ap)
- 1946–1959: Einar Musum (Ap)
- 1960–1963: Iver Skreden (Sp)
- 1963–1967: Johan Støa (Ap)
- 1968–1969: Klaus Stavø (Ap)
- 1969–1975: Karl Ydse (Ap)
- 1976–1991: Ola G. Tromsdal (Ap)
- 1992–1995: Kari Sundby (Sp)
- 1995–1999: Knut Einar Steinsli (Sp)
- 1999–2005: Gerd Janne Kristoffersen (Ap)
- 2005–2019: Bjørn Iversen (Ap)
- 2019–2023: Pål Sverre Fikse (Sp)
- 2023–present: Knut Snorre Sandnes (H)

== Economy ==
Offshore industry (Aker Verdal) and agriculture are two of the most important parts of Verdal's economy. After several lottery grand prizes were received by some inhabitants of Verdal, it is also known as one of the "Lotto-bygds" of Norway (Small places with high a concentration of lottery wins in the national game of Lotto).

== Transportation ==
European route E6 runs north and south through Verdalsøra, connecting this municipality with Steinkjer Municipality to the north and Levanger Municipality to the south. The Nordland Line railway also runs north and south through the municipality. There are two stations in Verdal: Verdal Station in Verdalsøra and Bergsgrav Station in Vinne.

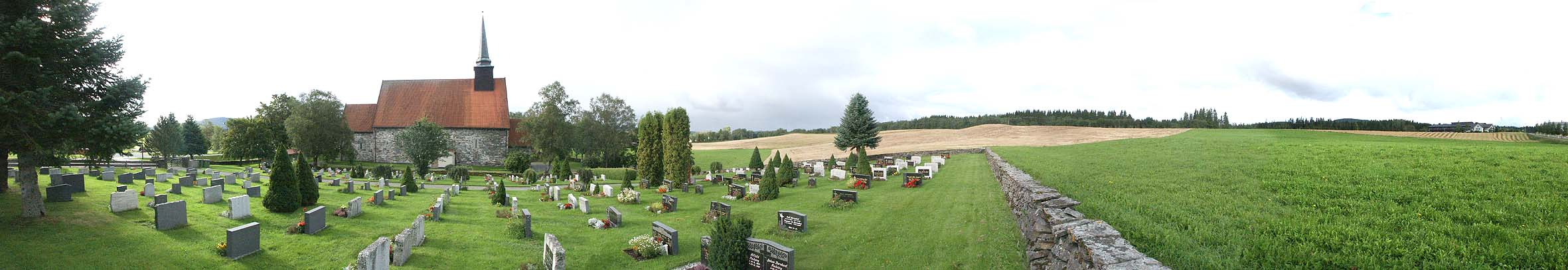
Stiklestad area, 30 August 2003

== Notable people ==
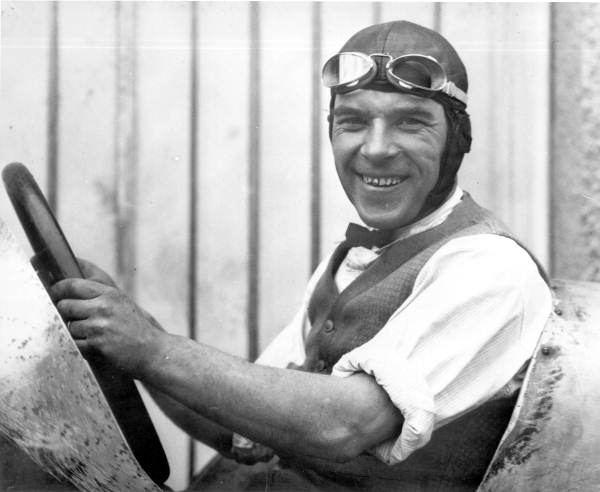
Sig Haugdahl, 1922

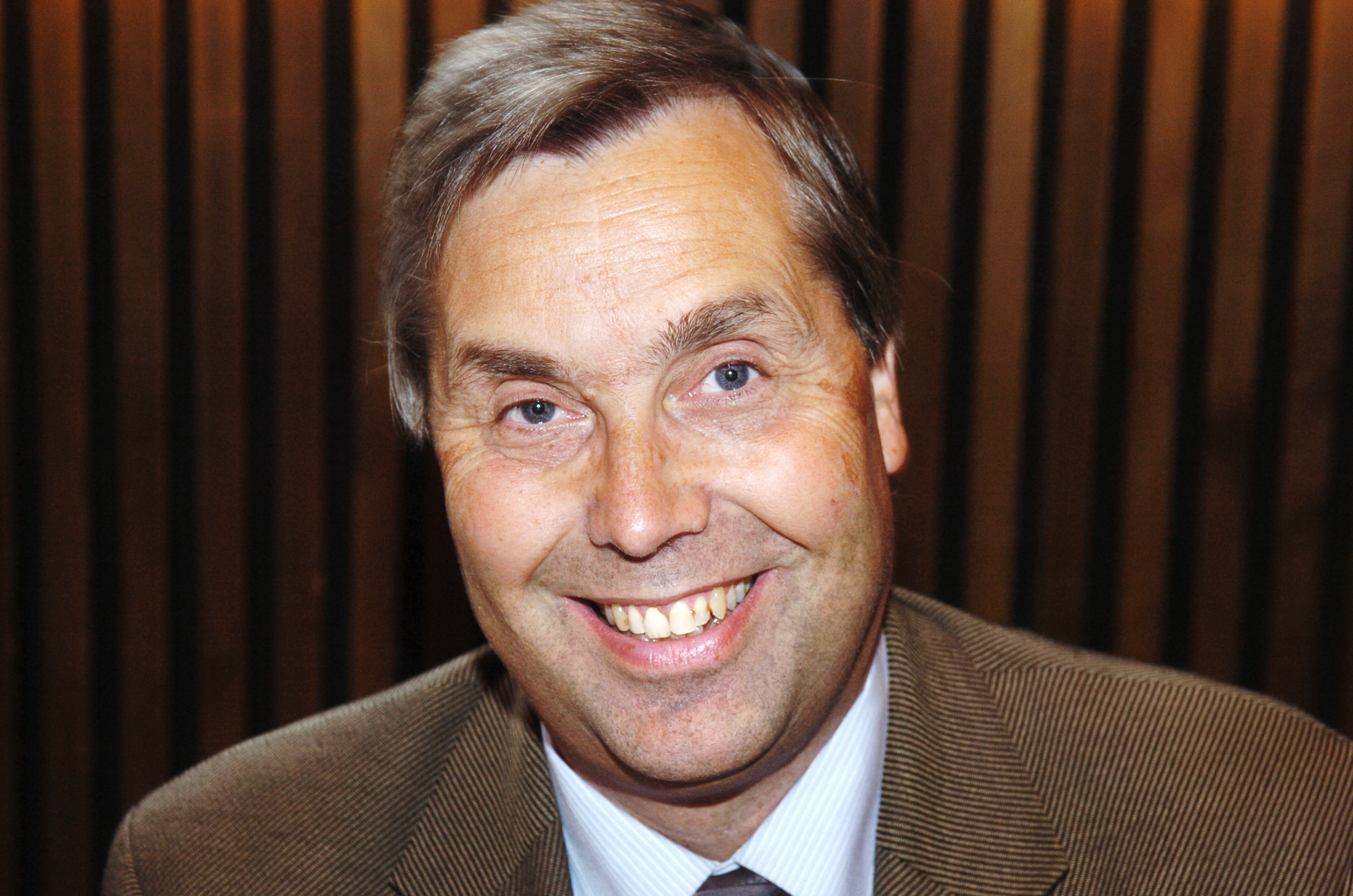
Bjoern Iversen, 2007

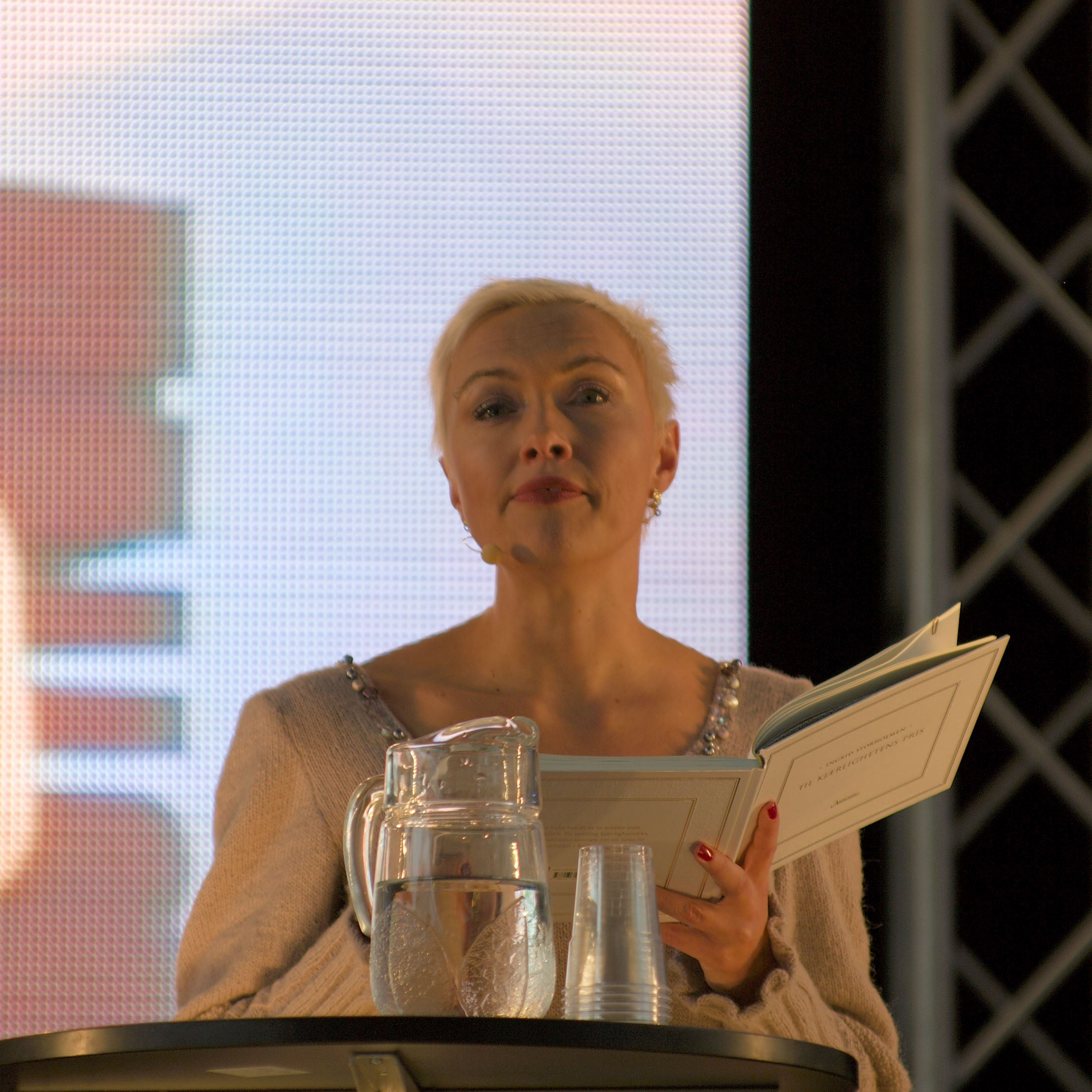
Ingrid Storholmen, 2011

- Johannes Brun (1832 in Verdal – 1890), a Norwegian stage actor
- Oluf Rygh (1833 in Verdal – 1899), a noted archaeologist, philologist and historian
- Olav Braarud (1885 in Verdal – 1969), an operational engineer of Holmenkolbanen
- Sig Haugdahl (1891 in Verdal – 1970), an IMCA "Big Car" champion 1927–1932 who promoted stock car racing in the USA
- Trygve Braarud (1903 in Verdal – 1985), a Norwegian botanist and academic
- Knut Getz Wold (1915 in Verdal – 1987), an economist, civil servant and governor of the Central Bank of Norway 1970–1985.
- Arnold Haukeland (1920 in Verdal – 1983), a Norwegian sculptor
- Asmund Bjørken (1933 in Verdal – 2018), a Norwegian musician who played the jazz and folk accordion and saxophone
- Vigdis Ystad (1942 in Verdal – 2019), a Norwegian literary historian and academic
- Nils Nordberg (born 1942 in Verdal), a crime writer, anthology editor and audio play director
- Hans Rotmo (born 1948 - 2024), a musician who published the first album sung in a Norwegian dialect
- Bjørn Iversen (born 1953), a Norwegian politician, Mayor of Verdal since 2005
- Rune Rebellion (born 1965 in Verdal), stage name of Rune Grønn, a guitarist
- Ingrid Storholmen (born 1976 in Verdal), a Norwegian poet, novelist, and literary critic
- Gjermund Larsen (born 1981 in Verdal), a traditional folk musician (violin) and composer

=== Sport ===
- Pål Benum (born 1935 in Verdal), an orthopediatrician and former long-distance runner, competed at 1964 Olympic Games
- Trond Viggo Toresen (born 1978 in Verdal), a footballer with over 250 club caps
- Even Barli (born 1991 in Verdal), a Norwegian goalkeeper for Ranheim with 234 caps.
- Jonas Svensson (born 1993 in Verdal), a footballer with over 270 club caps and 23 for Norway

== See also ==
- VKB
