= VKB (disambiguation) =

VKB may refer to:

- VKB, a Norwegian BASE jumping group
- Native Land Register, the official Fijian register of native landowners
- Victor Kusi Boateng, a Ghanaian theologian, philanthropist, motivational speaker
- Vocaloid Keyboard, a physical MIDI keyboard
- Vikarabad Junction railway station, the station code VKB
