= Lysthaugen =

Village in Verdal Municipality, Norway

- Village
- Interactive map of Lysthaugen
- Location within Trøndelag Location within Norway
- Coordinates: 63.7616°N 11.6222°E
- Country: Norway
- Region: Central Norway
- County: Trøndelag
- District: Innherred
- Municipality: Verdal Municipality

Area
  - Total: 0.24 km^{2} (0.093 sq mi)
- Elevation: 95 m (312 ft)

Population (2024)
  - Total: 283
  - Density: 1,179/km^{2} (3,050/sq mi)
- Time zone: UTC+01:00 (CET)
  - Summer (DST): UTC+02:00 (CEST)
- Post Code: 7650 Verdal

Lysthaugen is a village in Verdal Municipality in Trøndelag county, Norway. It is located on the southern side of the river Verdalselva, about 10 kilometres (6.2 mi) east of the town of Verdalsøra and about 7 kilometres (4.3 mi) southwest of the village of Vuku. The mountain Skitholvola lies about 8 kilometres (5.0 mi) south of the village.

The 0.24-square-kilometre (59-acre) village has a population (2024) of 283 and a population density of 1,179 inhabitants per square kilometre (3,050/sq mi).

== Climate ==
Climate data for Verdal - Reppe 1992–2018 (81 m, extremes 1971-2018 includes earlier stations)
Month	Jan	Feb	Mar	Apr	May	Jun	Jul	Aug	Sep	Oct	Nov	Dec	Year
Record high °C (°F)	12 (54)	12.5 (54.5)	14.7 (58.5)	20.1 (68.2)	28.6 (83.5)	29.8 (85.6)	33 (91)	30.4 (86.7)	27 (81)	22.5 (72.5)	15.8 (60.4)	12.9 (55.2)	33 (91)
Mean daily maximum °C (°F)	0.6 (33.1)	0.7 (33.3)	3.7 (38.7)	8.7 (47.7)	13.9 (57.0)	17 (63)	20.4 (68.7)	19.3 (66.7)	14.8 (58.6)	8.7 (47.7)	3.7 (38.7)	1.4 (34.5)	9.4 (49.0)
Daily mean °C (°F)	−2 (28)	−2.2 (28.0)	−0.3 (31.5)	3.9 (39.0)	8.5 (47.3)	12.2 (54.0)	15 (59)	14.3 (57.7)	10.2 (50.4)	5 (41)	1.2 (34.2)	−1.1 (30.0)	5.4 (41.7)
Mean daily minimum °C (°F)	−4.9 (23.2)	−4.8 (23.4)	−3 (27)	0.8 (33.4)	4.8 (40.6)	8.2 (46.8)	11.2 (52.2)	10.7 (51.3)	7.6 (45.7)	3.1 (37.6)	−1.2 (29.8)	−4.1 (24.6)	2.4 (36.3)
Record low °C (°F)	−26.4 (−15.5)	−25.4 (−13.7)	−20.5 (−4.9)	−14.7 (5.5)	−4 (25)	−1.2 (29.8)	1.8 (35.2)	0.2 (32.4)	−3.1 (26.4)	−8.8 (16.2)	−18.7 (−1.7)	−23 (−9)	−26.4 (−15.5)
Average precipitation mm (inches)	66 (2.6)	65 (2.6)	62 (2.4)	44 (1.7)	53 (2.1)	92 (3.6)	95 (3.7)	99 (3.9)	97 (3.8)	86 (3.4)	74 (2.9)	86 (3.4)	919 (36.1)
Source 1: Norwegian Meteorological Institute
Source 2: NOAA - WMO averages 91-2020 Norway
