= VKB =

Norwegian BASE jumping group

VKB is an acronym for Værdal'n Karsk og BASE, a BASE jumping group based in Trondheim, Norway. They specialize in high-speed tracking and proximity flying: wingsuit flight close to the mountain side.

The group takes its name from a jump from a crane at Aker Verdal. Most of the members know each other from the former Norwegian Institute of Technology. They decided in 2003 to take a scientific approach to the sport, and have been designing their own tracking suits to achieve a better glide ratio. These suits started out as simple modifications of normal outdoor clothing and have evolved to the Grusomme Gratis Gunda 3, or G3. The group have unusual access to testing facilities, including sophisticated computer modelling and a wind tunnel, enabling them to fine-tune their designs. VKB AS is registered as a manufacturer of clothing and other textile products. They also use a special program to log GPS readings 20 times a second to accurately record a flight.

Using the mountain face as a "vertical runway", members have been able to achieve unpowered horizontal flight at speeds of 260–270 kilometres per hour (160–170 mph).

VKB's first DVD, SuperTerminal, released in autumn 2005, showcasing proximity flying, received good reviews from the BASE and skydiving community. Part One of the feature is purely tracking whilst Part Two is Wingsuit flying. As bonus material there is over an hour of footage from Norway and Kyrgyzstan, some of which was previously published on skydivingmovies.com. VKB have also released several short movies online.
