= Verdalsøra Chapel =

Church in Trøndelag, Norway

- Verdalsøra kapell
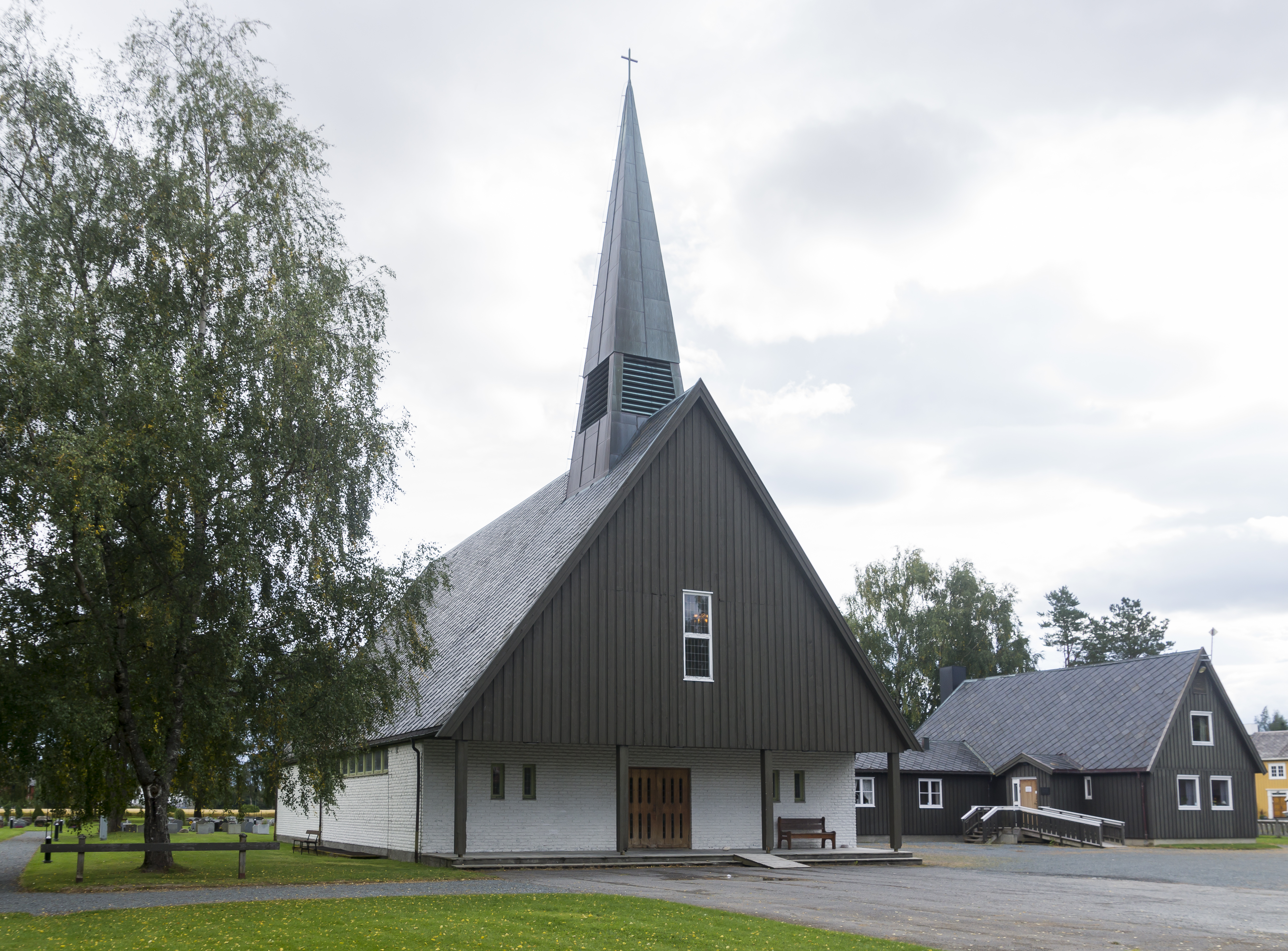
- View of the church
- Verdalsøra Chapel
- 63.799976935°N 11.495333611°E
- Location: Verdal Municipality, Trøndelag
- Country: Norway
- Denomination: Church of Norway
- Churchmanship: Evangelical Lutheran

History
- Status: Chapel
- Founded: 1969
- Consecrated: 1969

Architecture
- Functional status: Active
- Architect: Torgeir Suul
- Architectural type: Rectangular
- Completed: 1969 (57 years ago)

Specifications
- Capacity: 200
- Materials: Wood and brick

Administration
- Diocese: Nidaros bispedømme
- Deanery: Stiklestad prosti
- Parish: Stiklestad
- Norwegian Cultural Heritage Site
- Type: Church
- Status: Not protected
- ID: 85806

Verdalsøra Chapel (Norwegian: Verdalsøra kapell) is a chapel of the Church of Norway in Verdal Municipality in Trøndelag county, Norway. It is located in the town of Verdalsøra. It is one of the churches for the Stiklestad parish. The parish is part of the Stiklestad prosti (deanery) in the Diocese of Nidaros. The white brick and wood church was built in a rectangular style in 1969 using plans drawn up by the architect Torgeir Suul. The church seats about 200 people.

In 1993, the chapel was expanded by adding a church hall, kitchen, bathrooms, and office space.

== Media gallery ==
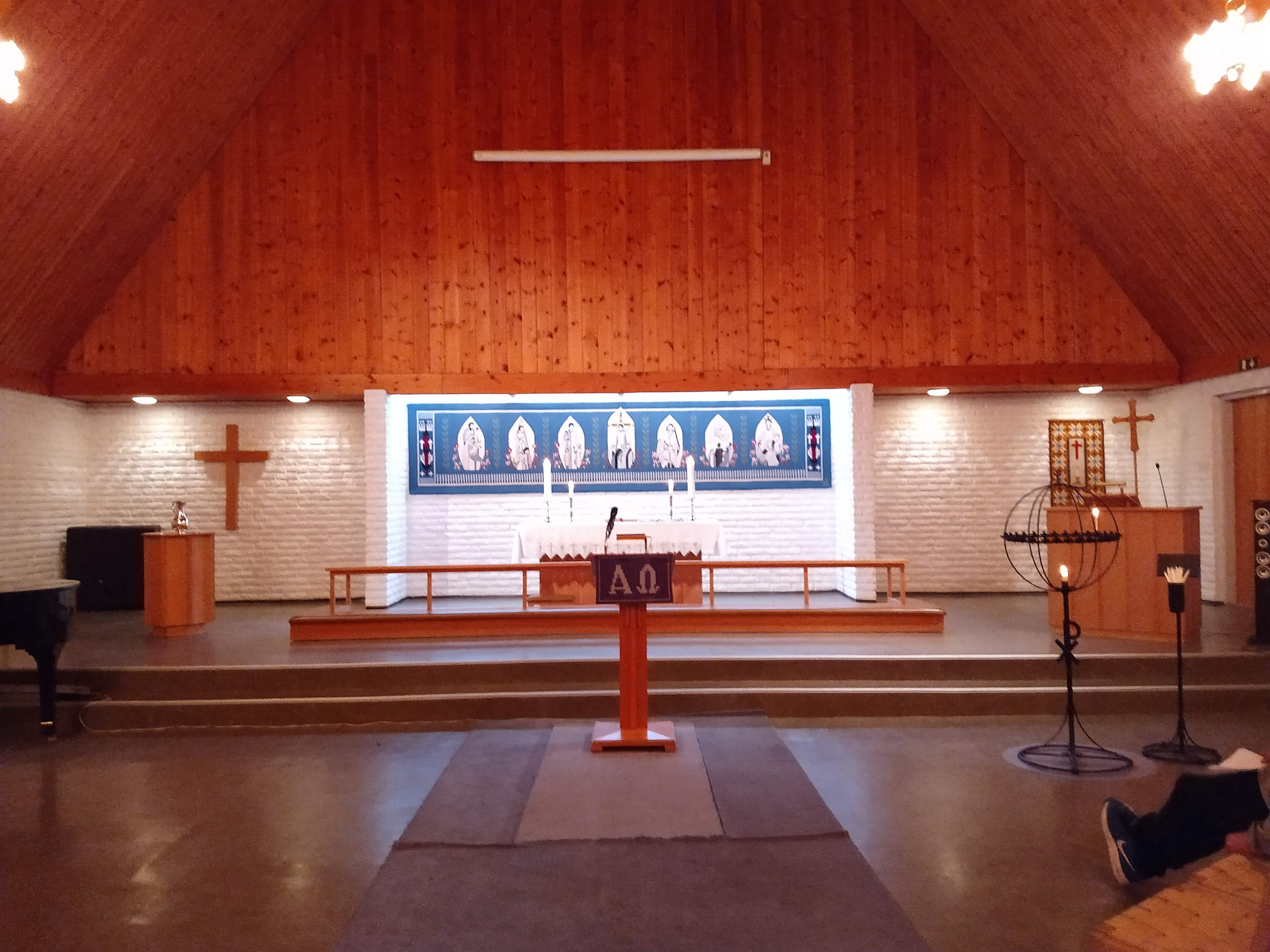

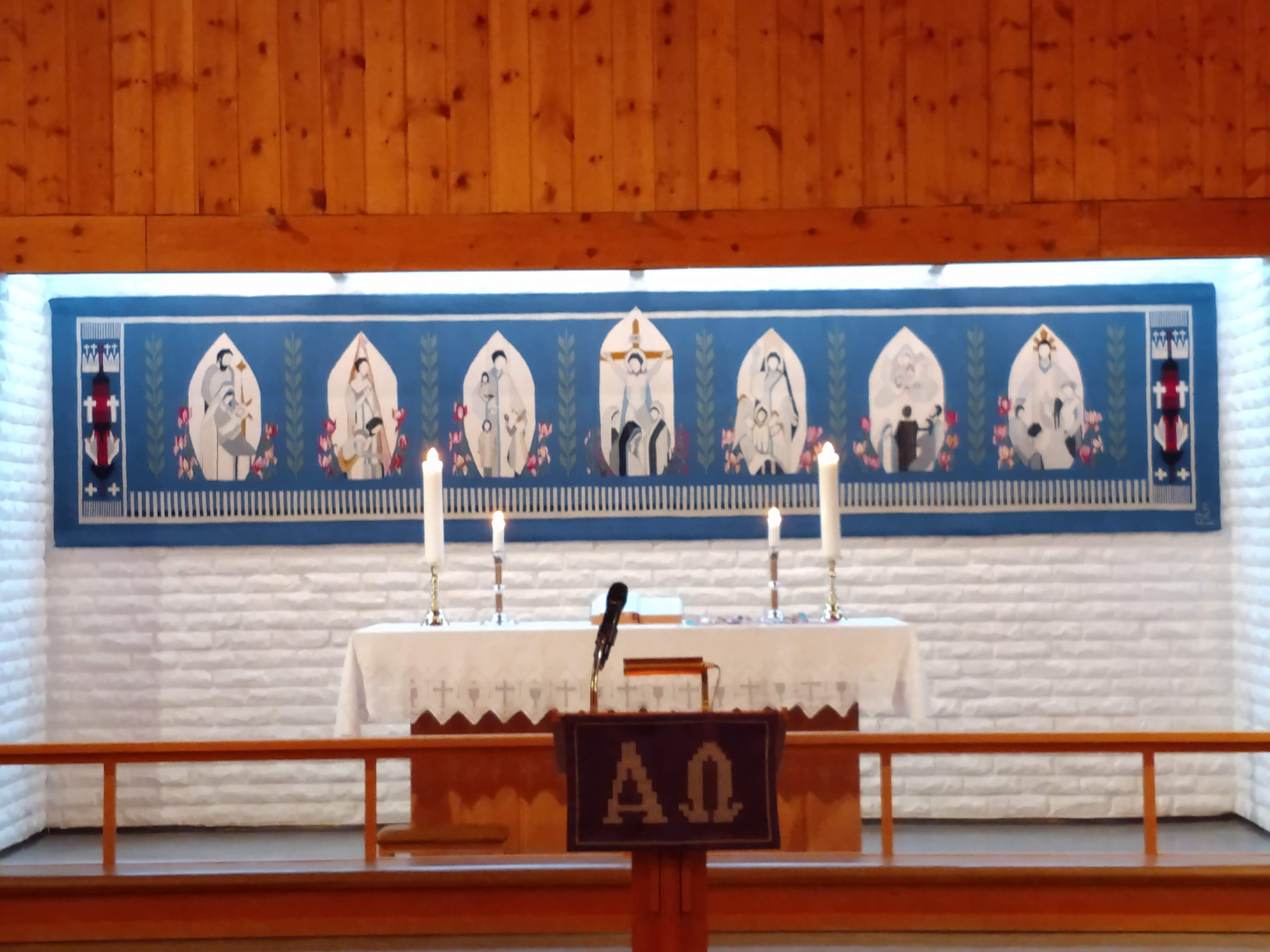

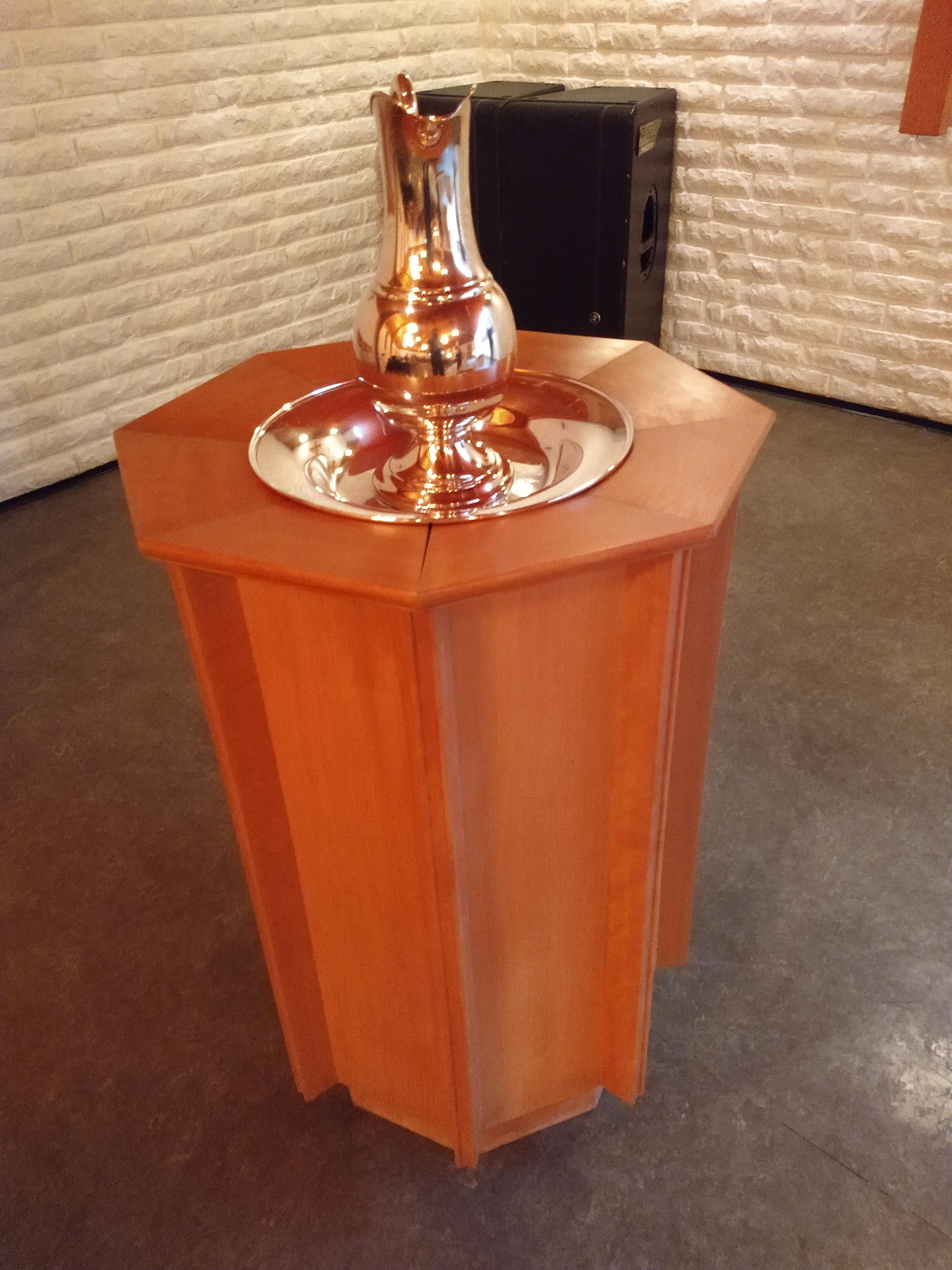

== See also ==
- List of churches in Nidaros
