= Ingrid Storholmen =

Norwegian poet, novelist and literary critic

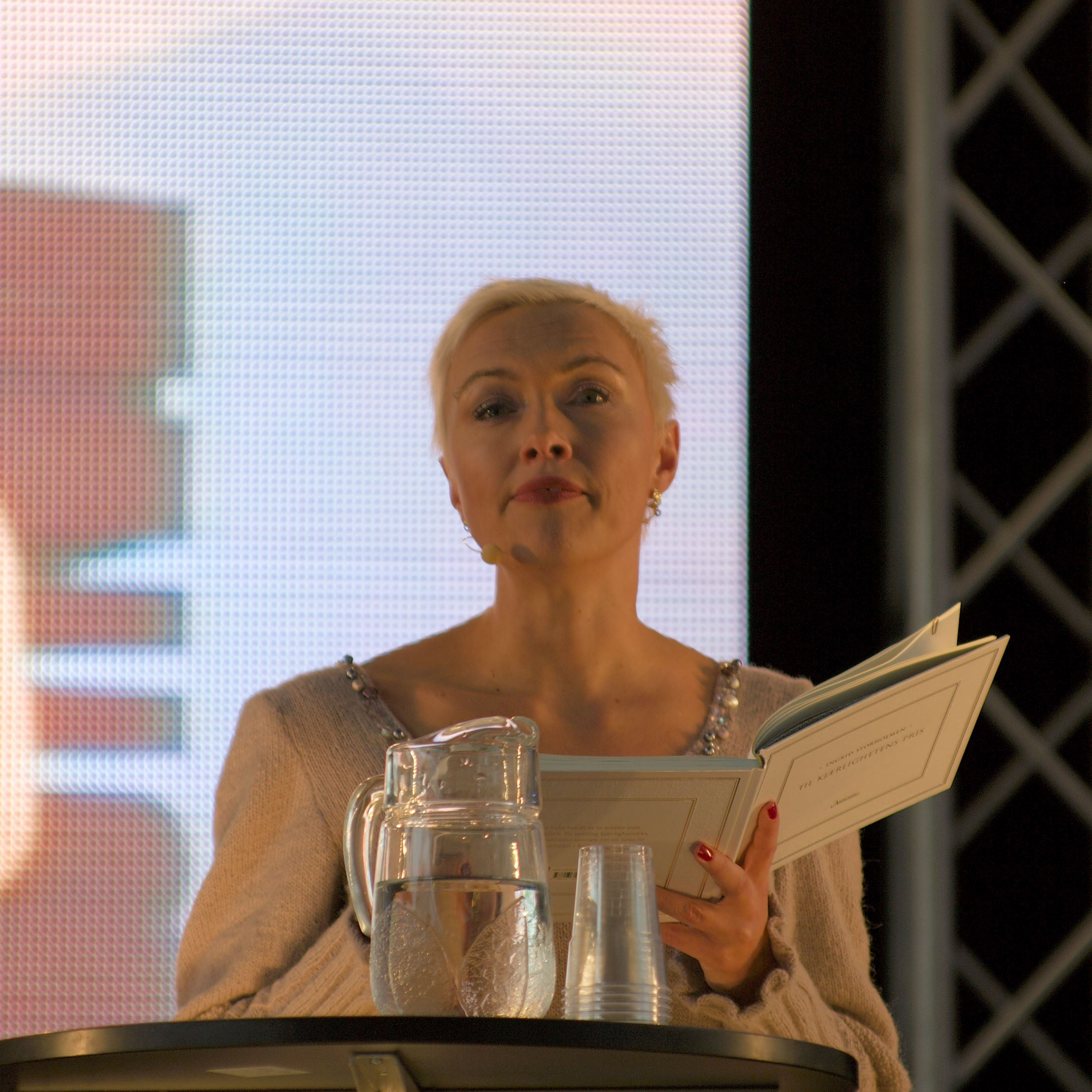
- Storholmen in 2011
- Born: 22 May 1976 (age 50); Verdal Municipality, Norway
- Occupations: Poet, novelist and literary critic

Ingrid Storholmen (born 22 May 1976 in Verdal Municipality, Norway) is a Norwegian poet, novelist and literary critic.

== Life and work ==
Storholmen made her literary debut in 2001 with the poetry collection Krypskyttarloven. Among her other collections are Siriboka from 2007, and Tsjernobylfortellinger (Voices from Chernobyl) from 2009. She was awarded Sultprisen in 2010, and the Ole Vig-prisen in 2011. She was awarded the Dobloug Prize in 2025.

== Reception ==
Tore Stavlund, writing on Poetry International, observes that "There is a gravity to Storholmen's poetry. From 2000 onwards, across four publications of poetry and one book of prose, she has developed a poetic language and a set of motifs which shirk neither human tragedy, nor the individual’s search for belonging, whether it be through love or family relationships." Voices from Chernobyl consists of several fictionalized accounts told by Chernobyl survivors, based on interviews Storholmen conducted with real victims. Critics noted how the book's lack of internal continuity reflects the chaos in the wake of the Chernobyl disaster. Storholmen hoped her book would remind people to remember disasters such as Chernobyl and Bhopal and to be wary of dangerous technology.

Here lay Tirpitz her latest novel was longlisted for the International Dublin Literary Award in 2025.

== Bibliography ==
Poetry collections

- Krypskyttarloven (The Sniper’s Law) 2001
- Skamtalen Graceland (The Disgraceful Speech, Graceland) 2005
- Siriboka (The Book of Siri) 2007
- Til kjærlighetens pris (In Praise of Love) 2011

Novels

- Tsjernobylfortellinger (Chernobyl Stories) 2009
- Here lay Tirpitz (Vani Prakashan Group - Yatra Books 2023)
