= Forbregd/Lein =

Village in Verdal Municipality, Norway

- Village
- Interactive map of Forbregd/Lein
- Location within Trøndelag Location within Norway
- Coordinates: 63.8103°N 11.5537°E
- Country: Norway
- Region: Central Norway
- County: Trøndelag
- District: Innherred
- Municipality: Verdal Municipality

Area
  - Total: 0.41 km^{2} (0.16 sq mi)
- Elevation: 98 m (322 ft)

Population (2024)
  - Total: 860
  - Density: 1,485/km^{2} (3,850/sq mi)
- Time zone: UTC+01:00 (CET)
  - Summer (DST): UTC+02:00 (CEST)
- Post Code: 7650 Verdal

Forbregd and Lein are two small adjoining villages in Verdal Municipality in Trøndelag county, Norway. Statistics Norway classifies the urban area as Forbregd/Lein. The village area is located about 4 kilometres (2.5 mi) northeast of the town of Verdalsøra and about 2 kilometres (1.2 mi) northwest of Stiklestad, along the southern shore of the lake Leksdalsvatnet.

The 0.41-square-kilometre (100-acre) village has a population (2024) of 860 and a population density of 1,485 inhabitants per square kilometre (3,850/sq mi).
