= Pisan cross =

Symbol of Pisa, Italy

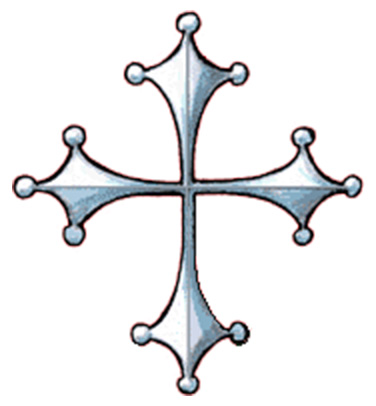
Pisan Cross

The Pisan Cross is the symbol of the northern Italian city of Pisa and its predecessor state, the sovereign maritime Republic of Pisa. It was the coat of arms of the people of Pisa, granted to them by Pope Benedict VIII to fight Saracens in Sardinia in 1017.

== Description ==
The Pisan cross is technically described as with keys (or paws) and three spheres on every arm. Its symbolism is unknown; the cross itself may represent Christ, and the twelve spheres his Apostles.

== History ==
Although the Pisan cross itself dates to 1017, the oldest surviving representation is a carving on the city walls, built in 1156 by counsellor Cocco Griffi. The city flag, red with the white cross on it, was officially recognized by Pope Callixtus II. The previous flag of Pisa was a plain field of vermillion, derived from the flag of Imperial Rome.

== Modern usage ==
Today, the cross remains a symbol of the city. A red shield with the cross on it is the official arms of the Comune of Pisa. It also appears in the lower-right quarter of the ensign and coat-of-arms of the Italian Navy, which combines it with the emblems of the other medieval Maritime Republics: Venice, Genoa and Amalfi.

=== Architecture ===
Architect Carlo Scarpa designed a Hall of the Pisan Cross in the museum and art gallery at Palazzo Abatellis which opened in 1954.

== Gallery ==
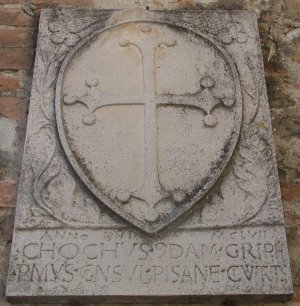
Oldest representation of the Pisan Cross (1156)

Flag of Pisa

Ensign of the Italian Navy, sporting the coat of arms of the four main maritime republics. Clockwise, starting from the upper left: Venice, Genoa, Pisa, Amalfi.

== See also ==
- Occitan cross, a similar figure
