= Bjørn Iversen =

Norwegian politician (born 1953)

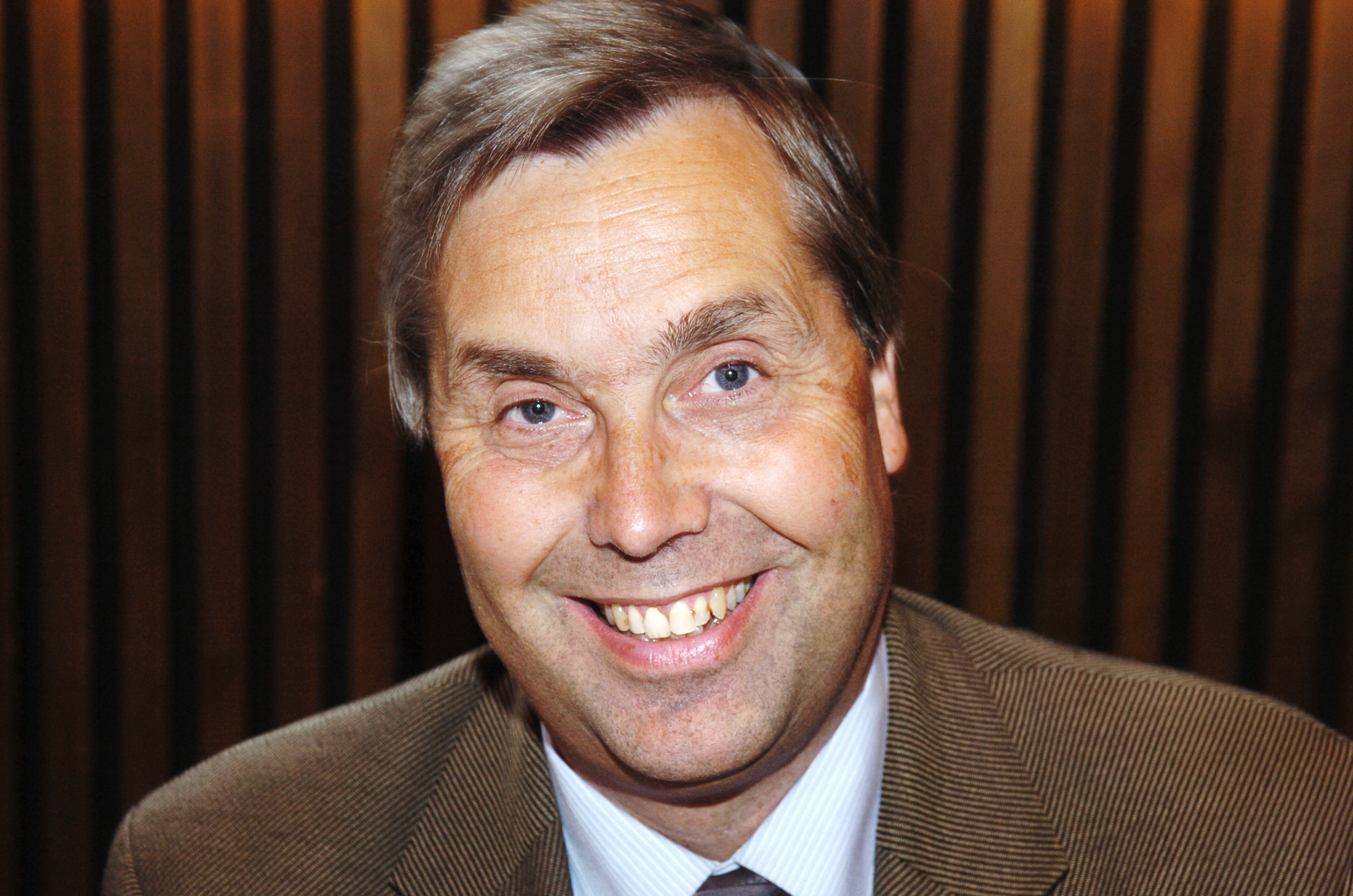
Editing Bjørn Iversen

Bjørn Iversen (born 18 March 1953) is a Norwegian politician for the Labour Party.

He served as a deputy representative to the Parliament of Norway from Nord-Trøndelag during the terms 1993–1997 and 1997–2001. In total he met during 3 days of parliamentary session.

On the local level Iversen was the mayor of Verdal Municipality from 2005 to 2019.
