= Leksdalsvatnet =

Lake in Trøndelag, Norway

- Interactive map of the lake
- Location: Innherred, Trøndelag
- Coordinates: 63.8475°N 11.6079°E
- Primary outflows: Figgja
- Basin countries: Norway
- Max. length: 12 kilometres (7.5 mi)
- Max. width: 4 kilometres (2.5 mi)
- Surface area: 21.73 km^{2} (8.39 sq mi)
- Shore length^{1}: 32 kilometres (20 mi)
- Surface elevation: 70 metres (230 ft)
- References: NVE
- ^{1} Shore length is not a well-defined measure.

Leksdalsvatnet is a lake in Trøndelag county, Norway that lies in Steinkjer Municipality and Verdal Municipality. It is located south of the town of Steinkjer and northeast of the town of Verdalsøra, about 6 kilometres (3.7 mi) east of the Trondheimsfjord. The 21.73-square-kilometre (8.39 sq mi) lake sits at an elevation of 70 metres (230 ft) above sea level. It is drained by Figgja.

The villages of Forbregd and Lein lie at the southern end of the lake and Leksdalen is on the eastern side of the lake (all in Verdal Municipality). The village of Sem (in Steinkjer Municipality) lies at the northern end of the lake.

== See also ==
- List of lakes in Norway
