= Bergsgrav station =

Railway station in Verdal, Norway

Bergsgrav Station Bergsgrav stasjon
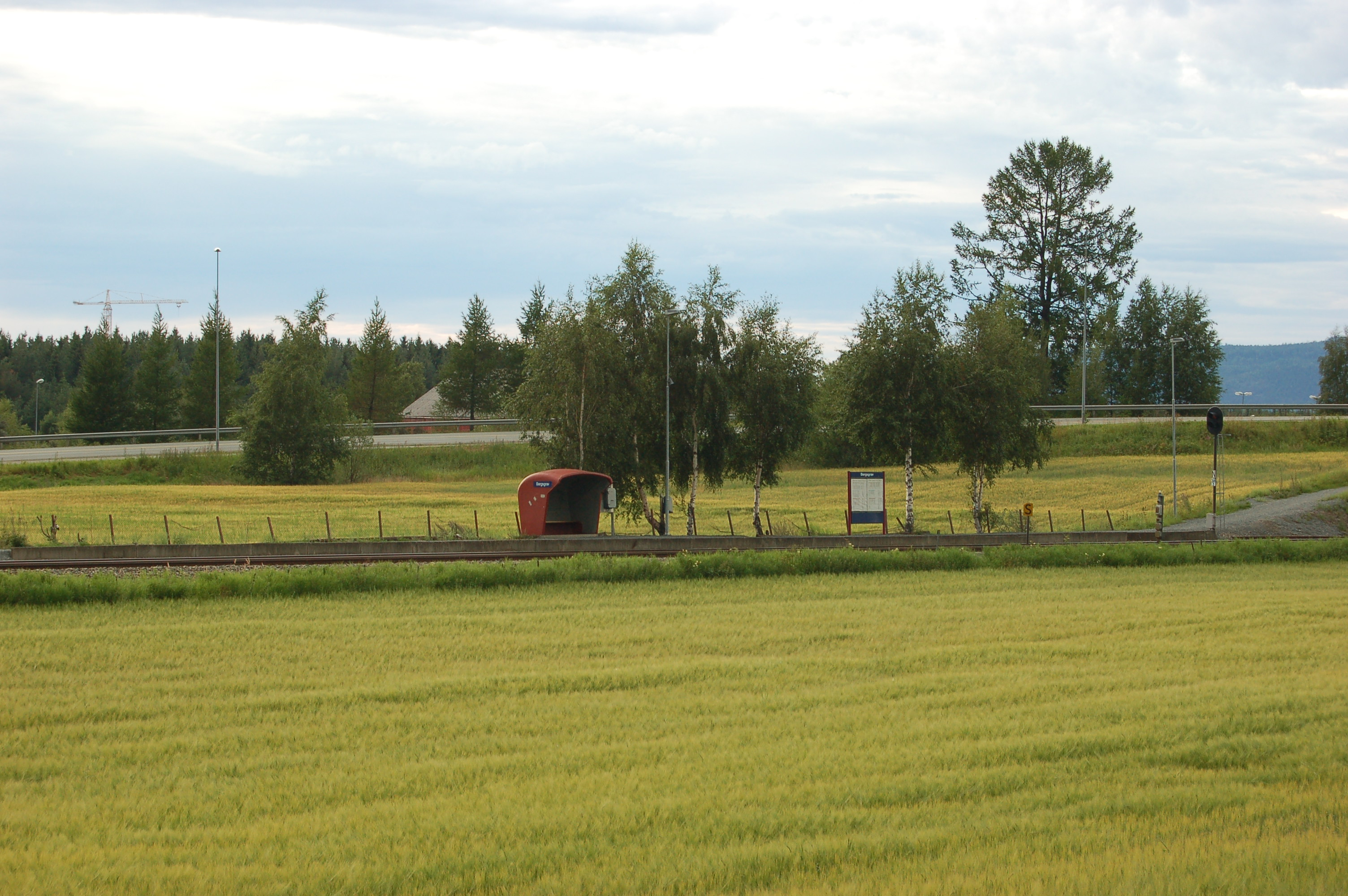
- View of the station

General information
- Location: Vinne, Verdal Municipality; Trøndelag; Norway
- Coordinates: 63.771176°N 11.471238°E
- System: Railway station
- Owner: Bane NOR
- Operator: SJ Norge
- Line: Nordlandsbanen
- Distance: 97.70 kilometres (60.71 mi)
- Platforms: 1

History
- Opened: 6 December 1977
Location
- Location within Trøndelag Location within Norway

Bergsgrav Station (Norwegian: Bergsgrav holdeplass) is a railway station located in the village of Vinne in Verdal Municipality in Trøndelag county, Norway. The station is located on the Nordland Line, and serves the southern Vinne suburb of Verdal. The station is only served by the Trøndelag Commuter Rail service between Steinkjer and Trondheim.

There has been a station here since 1938, but the current station was built on 6 December 1977.

Preceding station		Following station
HiNT Røstad	Nordland Line	Verdal
Preceding station	Local trains	Following station
HiNT Røstad	Trøndelag Commuter Rail	Verdal
