= Trones, Verdal =

Village in Verdal Municipality, Norway

Trones Nordskaget and Sørskaget
- Village
- Interactive map of Trones
- Location within Trøndelag Location within Norway
- Coordinates: 63.8176°N 11.4270°E
- Country: Norway
- Region: Central Norway
- County: Trøndelag
- District: Innherred
- Municipality: Verdal Municipality

Area
  - Total: 0.2 km^{2} (0.077 sq mi)
- Elevation: 41 m (135 ft)

Population (2024)
  - Total: 380
  - Density: 1,900/km^{2} (4,900/sq mi)
- Time zone: UTC+01:00 (CET)
  - Summer (DST): UTC+02:00 (CEST)
- Post Code: 7650 Verdal

Trones is a headland and residential area in Verdal Municipality in Trøndelag county, Norway. It is located about 4 kilometres (2.5 mi) north of the town of Verdalsøra, along the coast of the Trondheimsfjord. The villages of Nordskaget and Sørskaget are located on the headland, and they are combined under the name Trones by Statistics Norway.

== Geography ==
Trones lies on the eastern shore of the Trondheimsfjord, providing scenic views and access to fjord-based activities. The area is characterized by its proximity to both urban amenities in Verdalsøra and the natural landscapes typical of central Norway

== Population ==
The 0.2-square-kilometre (49-acre) village area has a population (2024) of 380 with an equal distribution of males and females. The population density of approximately 1,900 inhabitants per square kilometre (4,900/sq mi), Making it a relatively densely populated area for its size (0.2 km²). The age structure in 2024 is as follows: 95 residents aged 0 – 19, 234 aged 20 – 66, and 51 aged 67 and above

== Administration ==
Trones is part of Verdal Municipality, which is located in the county of Trøndelag in central Norway. Verdal is known for its strong agricultural and industrial sectors, as well as its rich cultural heritage, particularly the historic site of Stiklestad.

== History & Culture ==
While Trones itself is primarily a residential area, it is closely linked to the broader history and culture of Verdal. The municipality is renowned for the Battle of Stiklestad (1030), a pivotal event in Norwegian history, and for its vibrant cultural life, including amateur theater and local festivals. The area around Trones has also seen industrial development, particularly related to forestry and sawmills in the 19th and 20th centuries.

== Economy & Infrastructure ==
Trones benefits from its proximity to Verdalsøra and the larger Verdal industrial park, which is among the largest in Norway. The region’s economy is supported by agriculture, industry, and services. Trones is accessible by road and is served by local transportation networks connecting it to the rest of Verdal and the Trøndelag region.
