= Verdalsøra =

Town in Trøndelag, Norway

Verdal Verdalsøra
- Town/City
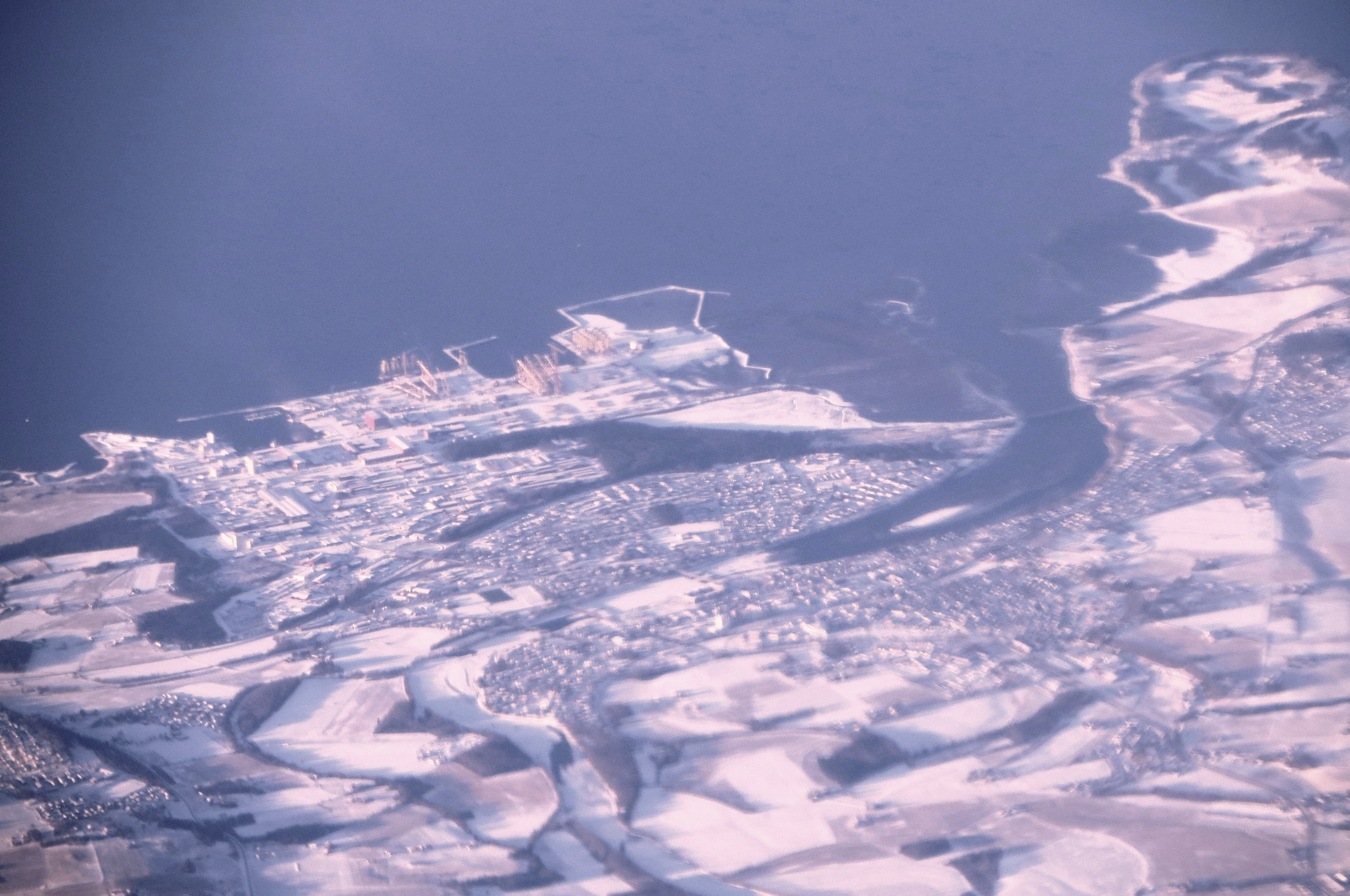
- View of the town harbor in winter
- Interactive map of Verdal; Verdalsøra
- Coordinates: 63.7930°N 11.4800°E
- Country: Norway
- Region: Central Norway
- County: Trøndelag
- District: Innherred
- Municipality: Verdal Municipality
- Established as
- Town (By): 1998

Area
  - Total: 5.95 km^{2} (2.30 sq mi)
- Elevation: 6 m (20 ft)

Population (2024)
  - Total: 8,838
  - Density: 1,485/km^{2} (3,850/sq mi)
- Time zone: UTC+01:00 (CET)
  - Summer (DST): UTC+02:00 (CEST)
- Post Code: 7650 Verdal

Verdalsøra or Verdal is a town in Verdal Municipality in Trøndelag county, Norway. The town is the administrative center of the municipality. It is located along the Trondheimsfjord at the mouth of the river Verdalselva. The village of Vinne lies 4 kilometres (2.5 mi) to the southeast, Trones lies about 5 kilometres (3.1 mi) to the north, the villages of Forbregd/Lein lie about 4 kilometres (2.5 mi) to the northeast (along the lake Leksdalsvatnet), and the village of Stiklestad lies about 3 kilometres (1.9 mi) to the east. In 1998, the municipal council of Verdal Municipality voted to grant the urban area of Verdalsøra town status under the laws of Norway.

The 5.95-square-kilometre (1,470-acre) town has a population (2024) of 8,838 and a population density of 1,485 inhabitants per square kilometre (3,850/sq mi).

The European route E6 highway and the Nordland Line railway both run north and south through the town, with one railway stop in the town: Verdal Station. Verdalsøra is the site of Aker Verdal (a large shipyard), Verdalsøra Chapel, Verdal Upper Secondary School, and a folk high school (Norwegian: folkehøgskole). The Rinnleiret beach area lies just south of the town, on the border with Levanger Municipality.

== See also ==
- List of towns and cities in Norway
