= Cleché =

Heraldic term

A cross cléchée (not voided, nor botony).

A cross cléchée voided botony (a cross of Toulouse).

In heraldry, a cross (or other ordinary) cleché (clechée, clechy) flares out at the ends before tapering back to a point, in a shape resembling the bow of an old-fashioned key (French clé). An example is the Occitan cross or Cross of Toulouse in the coat of arms of the counts of Toulouse: Gules, a cross cléchée, pommetty and voided Or. Because this Occitan cross is also voided (hollow), some writers have mistakenly taken the term cléché to be a synonym of voided or to include voiding as a defining feature.

== See also ==
- Cercelée, a similarly re-interpreted cross (originally similar to a cross moline)
