= Figgja =

- Interactive map of the river

Location
- Country: Norway
- County: Trøndelag
- Municipality: Steinkjer Municipality

Physical characteristics
- Source: Leksdalsvatnet
  - location: Steinkjer Municipality, Norway
  - coordinates: 63.9189356°N 11.579568°E
  - elevation: 70 metres (230 ft)
- Mouth: Beitstadfjorden
  - location: Steinkjer, Norway
  - coordinates: 64.00603°N 11.49805°E
  - elevation: 0 metres (0 ft)
- Length: 14 km (8.7 mi)

Figgja is a 14-kilometer (8.7 mi) long river in Steinkjer Municipality in Trøndelag county, Norway. The river drains the lake Leksdalsvatnet and flows north into Beitstadfjorden, the inner part of Trondheimsfjord, at the town of Steinkjer.

== See also ==
- List of rivers in Norway
