= Rinnleiret =

Area in Trøndelag, Norway

- IUCN category Ia (strict nature reserve)
- Interactive map of Rinnleiret
- Coordinates: 63.7719°N 11.4328°E

Rinnleiret is an area on the border of Levanger Municipality and Verdal Municipality in Trøndelag county, Norway. It is partially a nature reserve and it contains one of the county's largest beaches. Also located in the area is a former Royal Norwegian Army camp that was closed in 2002 and a demolished airport.
