= Cross moline =

Heraldic cross with bifurcated curved tips

A cross moline

The cross moline (also cross anchory, French croix ancrée "anchor cross") is a Christian cross, constituting a kind of heraldic cross.

== History ==
The name derives from its shape, which resembles a millrind, the iron clamp of the upper millstone, moline being the Old French for a mill. It is very similar to one of the varieties of the "fer de moline" heraldic charge (literal French: "iron of a mill"), the forked tips of which, however, circle out slightly more, akin to the "cross recercelee". It is borne both inverted and rebated, and sometimes "saltirewise" (i.e. in the form of a saltire).

The cross moline is associated with St. Benedict of Nursia. As a result, it is widely used as an emblem by the monks and nuns of the Order of St. Benedict, which he founded.

== Examples ==
Canting arms of Molyneux: Azure, a cross moline or

Templar cross moline

Crosses moline appear most notably in the arms of the following:

- Families:
  - Molyneux, a mediaeval Anglo-French family, Earl of Sefton, Viscount Molyneux, Molyneux baronets, etc. A famous example of canting arms: Azure, a cross moline or (Burke's Armorials, 1884)
  - the House of Broglie
- Institutions:
  - The University of Nottingham
- Modern examples:
  - Sefton Metropolitan Borough Council
  - Selby District Council
  - Huyton-with-Roby Urban District Council
  - North Warwickshire Borough Council
  - My Chemical Romance used a cross moline for MCRX.
  - Club Independiente Santa Fe from Bogotá, Colombia, used a cross moline in their first badge.

== Cercelée ==
Cross Cercelée

Anchor cross

A cross cercelée, sarcelly, or recercelée is an exaggerated cross moline, and to a lesser extent similar to the anchored cross, with its forked tips curving around both ways, like a ram's horns. The form is also called recercelée, for example by Boutell. Over time, English and French heralds reinterpreted the term (sometimes even treating the various spellings as multiple words with different meanings); because many crosses sarcelly were also depicted voided, some writers later used the term to mean voided, applied it to animals to mean cut in half, or applied it to bordures meaning engrailed or indented.

== See also ==
- Cleché

== Sources ==
- Pimbley's Dictionary of Heraldry.
- Burke's Armorials. 1884.
- Boutell, Charles; Aveling, S.T. (1890). Heraldry, Ancient and Modern: Including Boutell's Heraldry. 1890. p. 42. OCLC 6102523.
- "cross moline". Merriam Webster.
