= Aker Verdal =

Construction yard in Norway

Coordinates: 63.7887°N 11.4397°E

Kvaerner Verdal

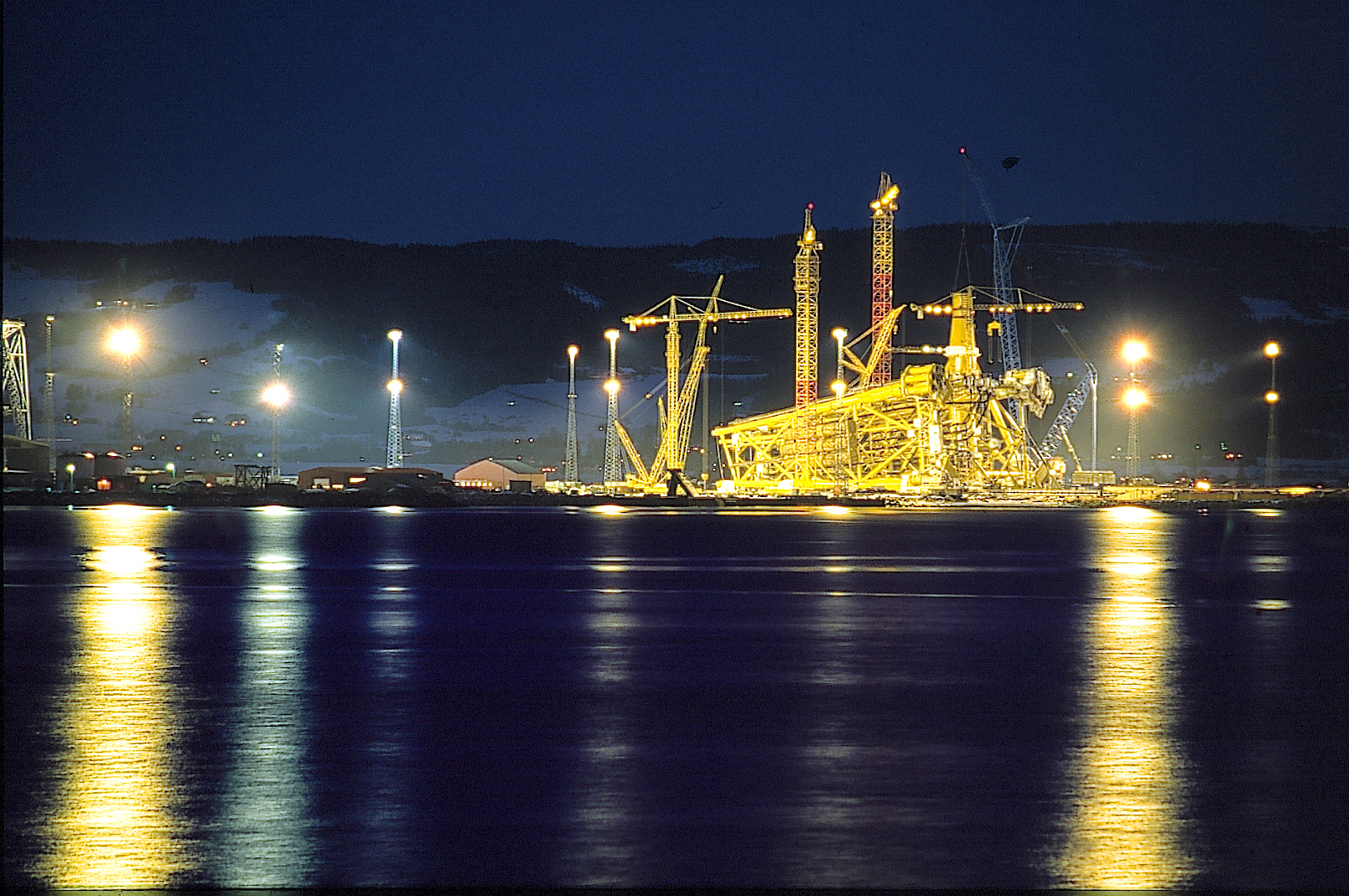
- Industry: Shipyard
- Founded: 1970
- Headquarters: Verdal, Norway
- Key people: Karl-Petter Løken, President & CEO
- Products: Jackets
- Revenue: ▲NOK 1,016 million (2005)
- Number of employees: 700 (2006)
- Parent: Kvaerner
- Website: www.kvaerner.com

Aker Verdal AS formerly known as Aker Kværner Verdal is a construction yard for large steel constructions and substructures for offshore oil platforms. The yard is owned by Kvaerner and is located in the town of Verdal in Verdal Municipality in Trøndelag county, Norway.

The yard was opened in 1970 and was owned by the Aker Group until the offshore section was demerged to Aker Maritime. After the merge between Kværner and Aker Maritime in 2005 the yard changed its name to Aker Kværner Verdal when it was taken over by Aker Kværner, but changed its name back to Aker Verdal in 2008 with the corporate name change to Aker Solutions. After a demerge in 2011, the yard became part of Kvaerner AS, the current corporate name.

During the 2000s Aker Verdal employed roughly 750 people, with an annual production value of £200 million between 2000 and 2009.

The main product of Aker Verdal is steel jackets for oil rigs. Since 1975 Aker Verdal has delivered 33 jackets as well as bridges, semisubmersible, flare towers, loading buoys, modules and decks as well as subsea templates have been delivered. The yard has Europe's largest fleet of cranes.

The company has five wholly owned subsidiaries: Aker Cold Bending, Aker Jacket Technology, Aker FDV, Aker Industributikk and Aker Sakkyndig Virksomhet. The company has ventured into fields including cold bending and construction of offshore mounts for wind mills. The company is cooperating with Nord-Trøndelag Elektrisitetsverk and ScanWind to construct land-based wind mills.
