= Steinkjer Station =

Railway station in Steinkjer, Norway

Steinkjer Station Steinkjer stasjon
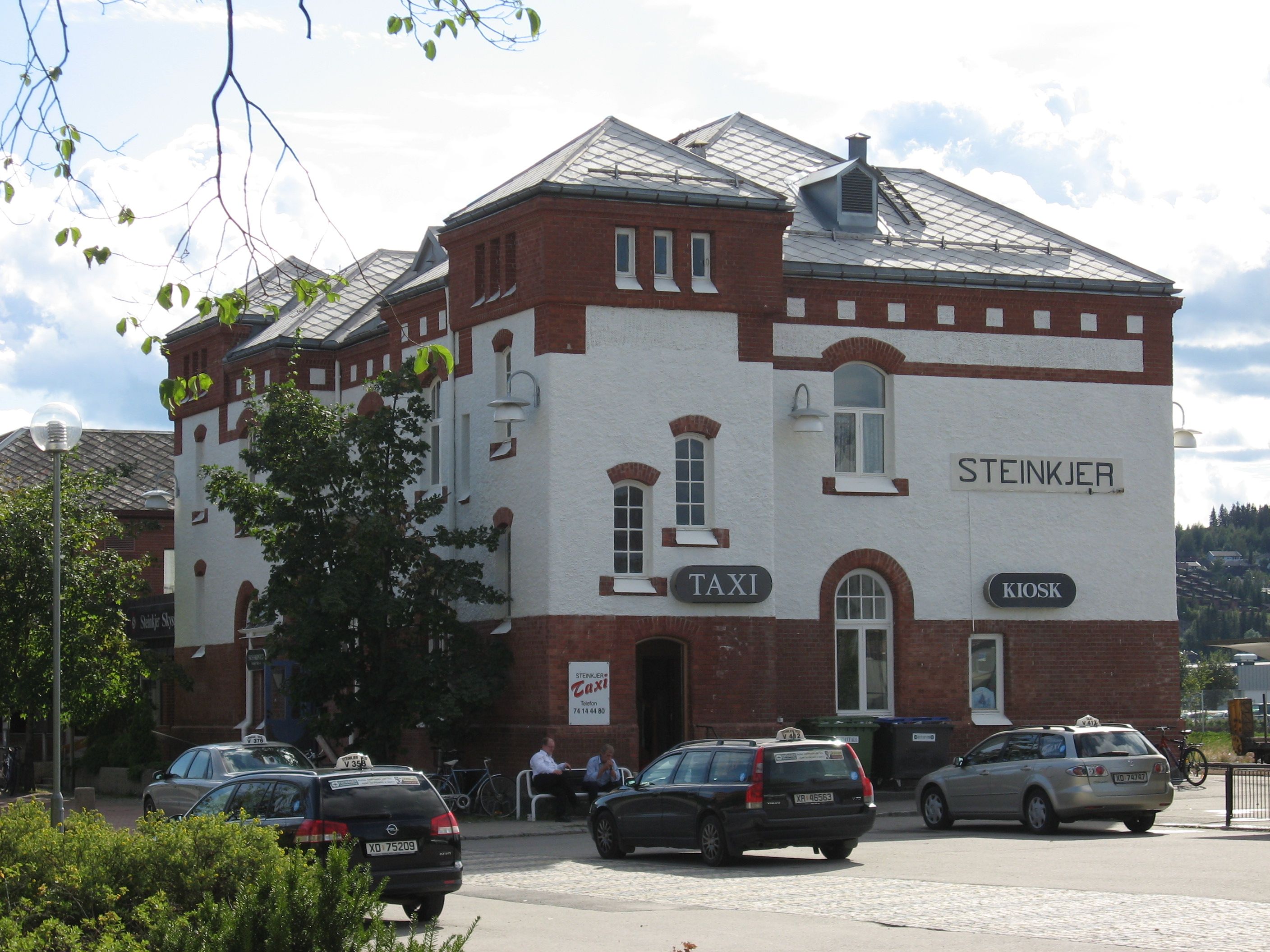
- View of the station

General information
- Location: Steinkjer, Steinkjer Municipality; Trøndelag; Norway
- Coordinates: 64°00′41″N 11°29′44″E
- Elevation: 3.6 m (12 ft) AMSL
- System: Railway station
- Owner: Bane NOR
- Operator: SJ Norge
- Line: Nordlandsbanen
- Distance: 125.5 km (78.0 mi)
- Connections: Bus: AtB

Construction
- Architect: Paul Armin Due

Other information
- Station code: STK

History
- Opened: 15 November 1905
Location
- Location within Trøndelag Location within Norway

Steinkjer Station (Norwegian: Steinkjer stasjon) is a railway station located in the town of Steinkjer in Steinkjer Municipality in Trøndelag county, Norway.

The station is located on the Nordland Line, serving both local and express trains northbound through Innherred and on to Nordland county, and southbound to the city of Trondheim. The staffed station sits adjacent to the European route E6 highway. The station is at the northern terminus of the Trøndelag Commuter Rail to Trondheim. An hourly service usually runs on this line.

== History ==
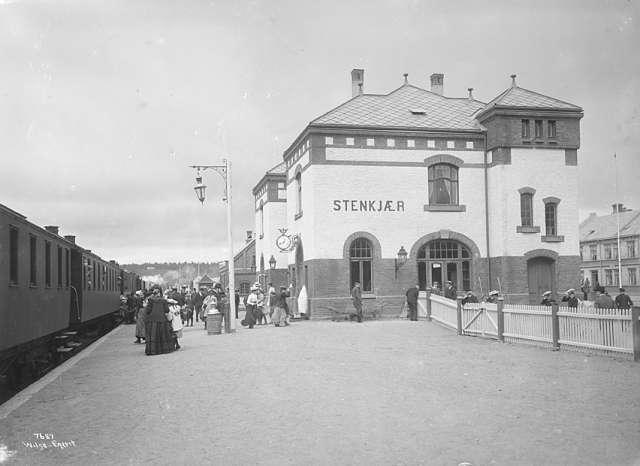
Steinkjær station in 1907.

Steinkjer Station was built as part of Hell–Sunnan Line and opened on 15 November 1905 along with the rest of the line north of Verdal Station. The original name of the station was Steinkjær but on 5 June 1925, the spelling was changed to the present Steinkjer.

Steinkjer Station was designed by architect Paul Armin Due. He designed a number of other stations built by the Norwegian State Railways, including virtually all stations north of Levanger on Hell–Sunnanbanen and many stations on Bergensbanen, including all those in Hallingdal. The building is on two floors with living quarters for the station master on the second floor. The building was built in Art Nouveau architectural style with marked portals.

| Preceding station | Express trains | Following station |
|---|---|---|
| Levanger towards Trondheim S | F7 | Jørstad towards Bodø |
| Preceding station | Local trains | Following station |
| Sparbu | Trøndelag Commuter Rail | Terminus |
