= NSB B5 =

Class of Norwegian railway coaches

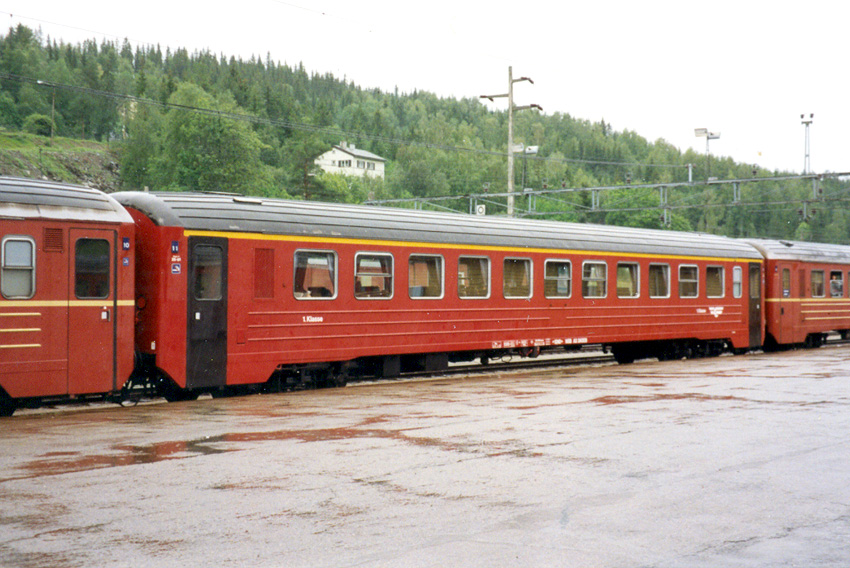
An A3 at Ål Station

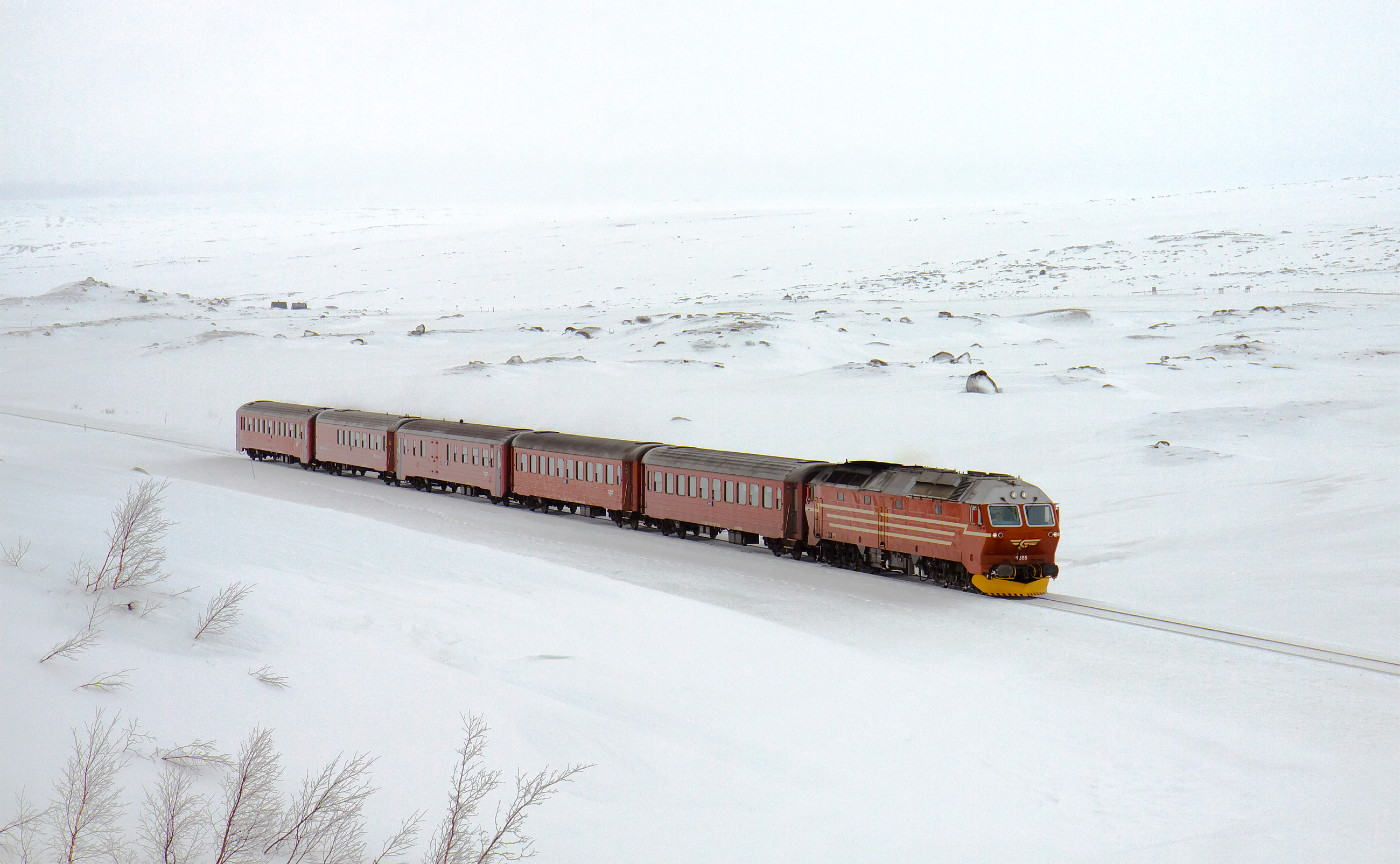
A Di 4 hauling a mixed Class 3 and Class 5 train. over Saltfjellet on the Nordland Line. The third car is BF14 and the fifth car is BC5.

NSB Class 5 or B5 is a series of passenger carriages built by Strømmens Værksted for the Norwegian State Railways. Built between 1977 and 1981, they went through a major upgrade between 2008 and 2012. Sixty-three units were delivered. Each is 25.30 metres (83 ft 0 in) long, 3.10 metres (10 ft 2 in) wide, and 4.075 metres (13 ft 4.4 in) tall. They weigh 42 tonnes (41 long tons; 46 short tons) and have a maximum permitted speed of 160 kilometres per hour (99 mph). They are used predominantly on the Dovre Line, the Nordland Line and the Vestfold Line.

Coach types before upgrade:

A3 24008, 24009	Coach with 1st class seating. 44 seats.
B5-2 26001-26063	Coach with 2nd class seating. 66 seats.
BC5 26029-26032	Coach with 2nd class seating (45 relaxing seats)
BC5-2 26041-26047	Coach with Business class (Komfort) 30 seats and 2nd class 30 seats seating
BF13 21701-21710	Coach with baby compartment, wheelchair compartment, staff room and luggage room. 20 seats.
BF14 21711-21730	Coach with baby compartment, wheelchair compartment, staff room and luggage room. 14-16 seats.

All A3s and BF13s, and some BF14s, are withdrawn.

Coach types after upgrade 2010-2012:

B5-3	Coach with 2nd class seating
B5-5	Coach with 2nd class seating. Pets allowed.
B5-6	Coach with 2nd class seating. Pets not allowed.
A5-1	Coach with business class seating (Komfort)
BC5-3	Coach with 2nd class seating, playroom and wheelchair area
FR5-1	Coach with bistro, staff room and luggage room

The first upgraded coaches were used on the Vestfold Line (Oslo-Skien) from 20 June 2011.

As of December 2013, only upgraded coaches are used in ordinary traffic with passengers, except a couple of old BF14 that are still used in combination with B3 coaches on the Oslo-Bergen line. A few old coaches have been transferred to Jernbaneverket and the Norwegian Railway Museum.

== Renovation ==
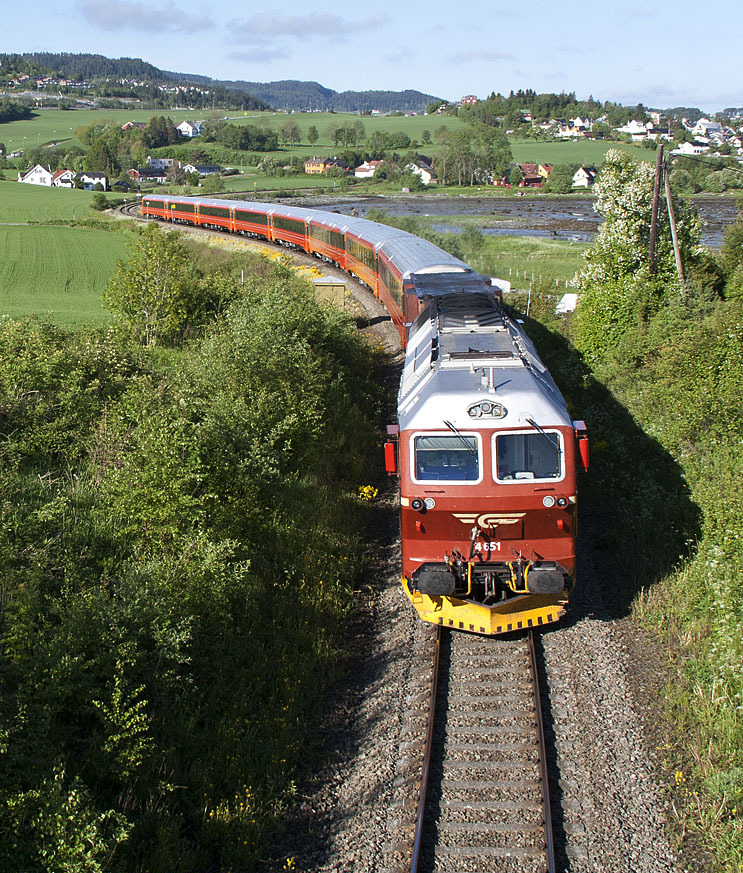
NSB Di 4-hauled train with renovated B5 cars on the Nordland Line

As part of a larger renovation program which also included the B7 carriages and the Class 69 trains, 56 B5 cars were renovated at Bombardier Transportation's plant in Hungary. The purpose of the upgrade was to provide commuters along the Vestfold Line with an intermediate upgrade while waiting for the delivery of Class 74 electric multiple units which were scheduled for delivery in 2010. The set consists of seven sets of eight carriages. When the Class 74 trains are delivered, NSB will move the B5 cars to the Nordland Line and the Dovre Line, where they will also be equipped with a dining car.

The process is more than two years delayed, and the first set was delivered in 2008. With the new schedule, the last sets were delivered in 2012. Upgrades include new, now closed, toilets, new seating, power outlets, air conditioning and NSB's new red, silver and orange livery. In addition, they will receive new bogies. After delivery, the carriages will have to be test-run for up to six months before being approved by the Norwegian Railway Inspectorate.

During the upgrade, asbestos was found, which was one of the main causes of the delay. Originally the upgrade was budgeted to cost 500 million Norwegian krone (NOK), but with the extra work the bill increased by NOK 200 million. Another cause was that NSB switched their supplier of heating, air conditioning and ventilation. In September 2009, Bombardier sued NSB in an arbitration, demanding NOK 172 million in extra payment. NSB, on the other hand, has sued Bombardier for the same amount of money. The companies have agreed on part of the compensation, although how much the total will be, is the issue of the case. Finally, Bombardier had to pay NOK 73 million to NSB.
