= Nordland Line =

Norwegian railway line between Trondheim and Bodø

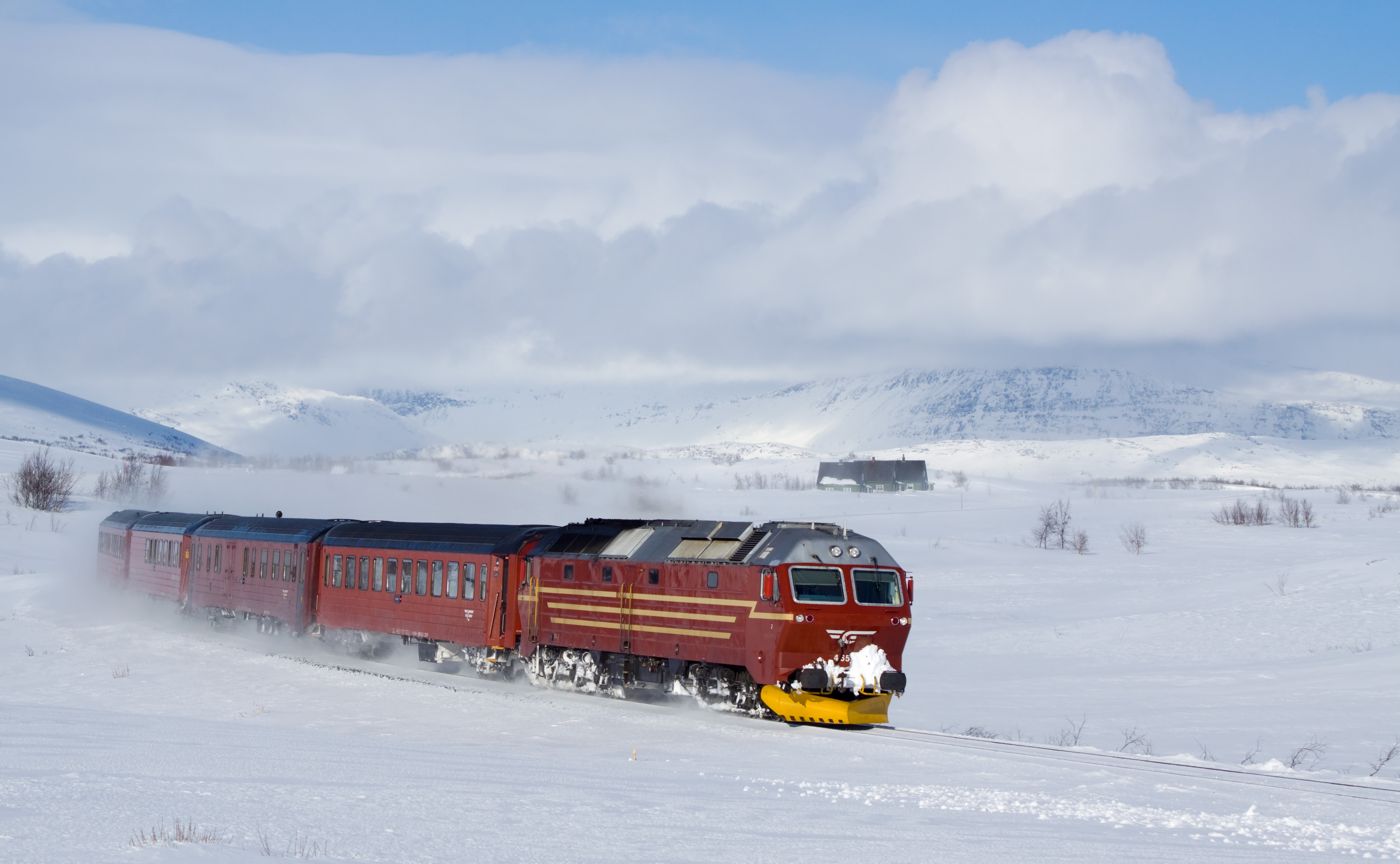
- An NSB Di 4-hauled train at Saltfjellet

Overview
- Native name: Nordlandsbanen
- Owner: Bane NOR
- Termini: Trondheim Central Station; Bodø Station
- Stations: 43

Service
- Type: Railway
- System: Rail transport in Norway
- Operator(s): SJ Norge; CargoNet
- Rolling stock: Class 92, Class 93, Di 4, Vossloh Euro

History
- Opened: 22 July 1882 (to Hell); 1 February 1962 (to Bodø)

Technical
- Line length: 729 km (453 mi)
- Number of tracks: Single
- Track gauge: 1,435 mm (4 ft 8 1/2 in)
- Electrification: No
- Operating speed: 120 km/h (75 mph)

The Nordland Line (Norwegian: Nordlandsbanen, Urban East Norwegian: [ˈnûːrlɑnsˌbɑːnn̩]) is a 729-kilometer (453 mi) railway line between Trondheim and Bodø, Norway. It is the longest in Norway and lacks electrification. The route runs through Trøndelag and Nordland counties, carrying a combination of commuter, long-haul passenger and freight trains. From Trondheim Central Station to Steinkjer Station the line is most heavily used, with hourly services by the Trøndelag Commuter Rail. There are three branch lines—the Stavne–Leangen Line at Leangen Station, the Meråker Line at Hell Station and the Namsos Line at Grong Station.

The section from Trondheim to Hell opened on 22 July 1882. The next section, initially the Hell–Sunnan Line, opened in stages between 1902 and 1905. The line was lengthened to Snåsa Station on 30 October 1926 and then to Grong on 30 November 1929. Construction continued in a slow pace northwards, but was accelerated by the Wehrmacht after the 1940 occupation. The line was built through most of Helgeland and opened in seven stages to Dunderland Station in the next five years. The line then had to be brought up to standards before continuing northwards. It opened to Røkland Station in 1955, to Fauske Station in 1958 and to Bodø Station on 1 February 1962.

== Route ==
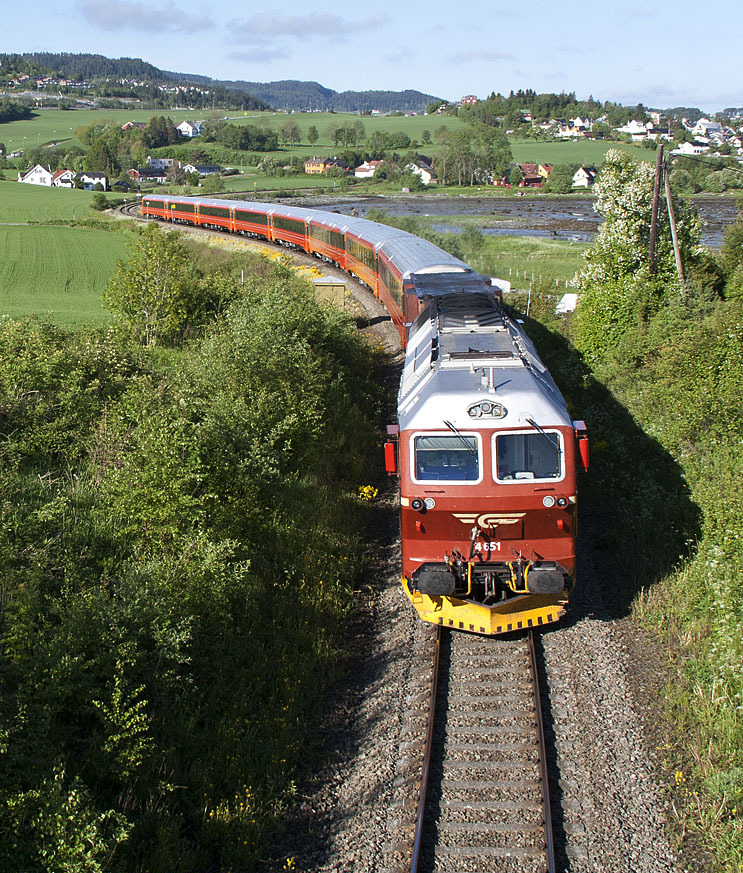
NSB Di 4 hauling a passenger train through Være in eastern Trondheim

Traditionally the Nordland Line was defined as running from Hell to Bodø, but the National Rail Administration has officially classified it as running from Trondheim Central Station to Bodø, a distance of 728 kilometers (452 mi). This makes it the longest railway line in Norway. It is single track, standard gauge, but not electrified. Centralized traffic control is installed south of Mosjøen, with partial automatic train control. GSM-R is installed on the whole line. The Nordland Line is owned and maintained by the Norwegian National Rail Administration.

From Trondheim the line runs largely following the Trondheimsfjord to Steinkjer Station, traveling through the districts of Stjørdalen and Innherred. At Hell Station, 31.54 km (19.60 mi) from Trondheim, the Meråker Line branches off. North of Steinkjer (125.50 km or 77.98 mi) the line follows the east shore of Snåsavatnet until Snåsa Station (181.64 km or 112.87 mi), passing into the district of Namdal. At Grong Station (219.54 km or 136.42 mi) the line intersects with the Namsos Line. It continues up the valley through an inland route and passes into the district of Helgeland. There it reaches a summit of 320 meters (1,050 ft) above sea level at Majavatn Station (321.74 km or 199.92 mi) before descending back to sea level near Mosjøen Station (406.01 km or 252.28 mi). The line continues along a rugged section often hugging the sides of fjords until Mo i Rana Station (497.98 km or 309.43 mi).

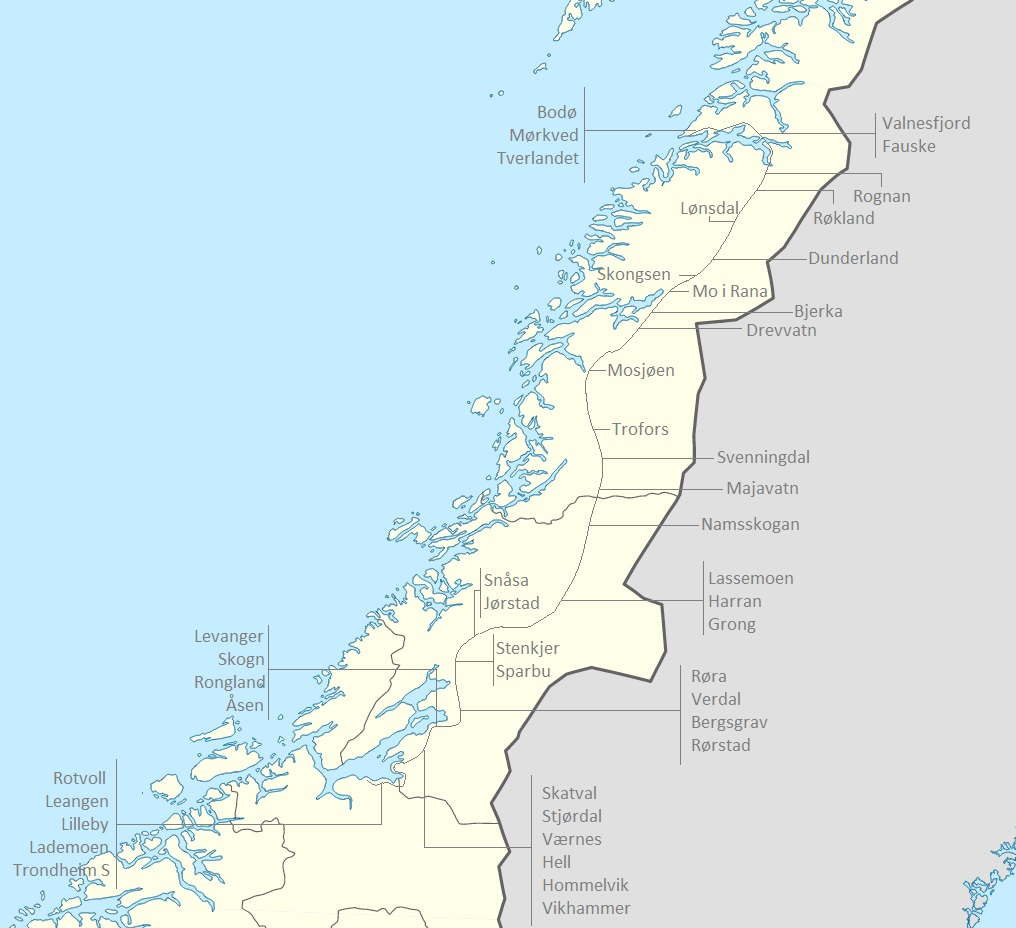
Map of the line

From Mo the line runs up the Dunderland Valley at a 1.2% gradient. From Dunderland Station (543.03 km or 337.42 mi) the line climbs at a 1.8% gradient for 38.5 kilometers (23.9 mi) onto the Saltfjellet mountain plateau. It reaches its highest elevation just south of Stødi Station (581.46 km or 361.30 mi), at 680 meters (2,230 ft) above mean sea level, about 1.8 kilometers (1.1 mi) after passing the Arctic Circle. The line then descends for the next 40 kilometers (25 mi) at a 1.8% gradient until reaching almost sea level at Rognan Station (647.76 km or 402.50 mi), by which time it has reached the district of Salten. The section onward to Finneid Station (671.08 km or 416.99 mi) has steep terrain and the line hugs the mountainside, frequently entering tunnels. From Fauske the line heads west to Bodø Station.

== History ==
=== Trondheim–Hell ===
A committee to look into building a railway northwards from Trondheim was established in 1870. The goal was to build a railway which connected to Jämtland, Sweden. Similar investigations were carried out on the Swedish side of the border. An early alternative to build via Verdal was discarded. The line was at first estimated to cost 4.7 million Norwegian krone and the line built with a narrow gauge. Shares in the railway company were offered for sale in 1871, of which NOK 1.2 million was bought by Trondheim Municipality. The Parliament of Norway rejected the line the same year, although it resulted in a local railway committee being established. Legislation to build the line was passed by Parliament on 2 May 1872. The state would receive shares in the company equal to their monetary contribution. In 1873, the Parliament of Sweden voted to build a narrow gauge railway from Torpshammar to the Norwegian border, where it would connect to the Sundsvall–Torpshammar Line.

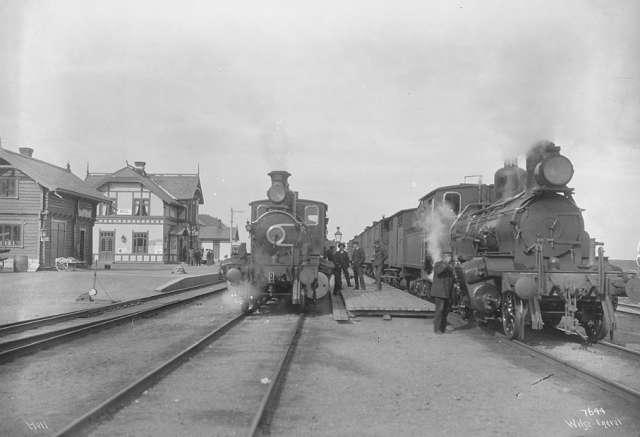
Two steam locomotives at Hell Station in 1907

By 1874, Swedish authorities had decided that all railways should be built in standard gauge, and the Parliament of Norway chose to change their configuration to the same gauge in 1874, increasing estimated costs from NOK 4.7 to 8.9 million. In Trondheim, the existing Trondhjem–Støren Line terminated at a station at Kalvskinnet. This was a cul-de-sac station, and to allow the two lines to interconnect, a new station was built at Brattøra, costing NOK 1.4 million.

The river of Stjørdalselva created a barrier just north of Hell, and it would be cheaper to make the line go on the south shore of the river down to Hegra. However, the major population center was located at Stjørdalshalsen, on the north shore of the river. Locally, there were many protests against the line bypassing such a large town, but the cost of the bridge made parliament choose the southern alternative. This gave residents in Stjørdal a considerably longer route to the train, since they had to cross the river to get access to the railway. This decreased the railway's ability to compete with the steam ships and thus the overall profitability of the line.

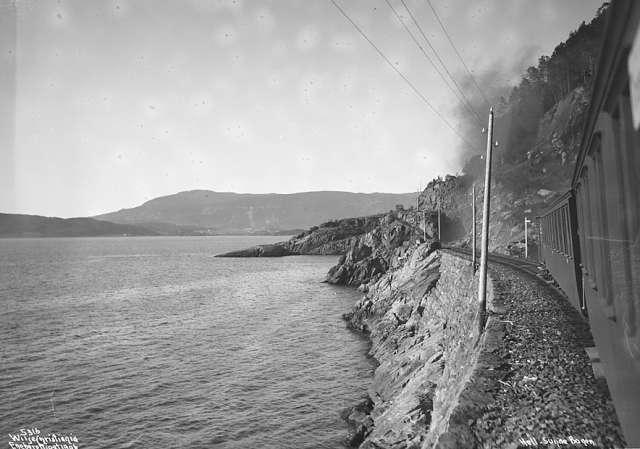
The line following the Trondheimsfjord past Muruvik in 1906

The first blasting was performed during a ceremony in 1875, but the real work did not start until 1876. Construction of the last section into Trondheim, along with the station, did not start until 1878, due to disagreements about the plans. By 1878, tracks were laid from Leangen to the border between Nedre Stjørdal Municipality and Øvre Stjørdal Municipality (54 km or 34 mi). On 27 August 1879, the first train ran from Rotvoll Station, just outside Trondheim, to the national border. Before the line was finished in Sweden, the Norwegian State Railways operated a train once per week from 11 February 1880. Full service was introduced on 17 October 1881, though the line was not yet completed to Östersund; nor did Trondheim Central Station open until 1882. The official opening was on 22 July 1882.

The work paid well, and attracted many navvies to the area. Land-owners were compensated NOK 50–200 per hectare (2.5 acres) for cultivated land, and NOK 10 per hectare for forest. Many local farmers made good money offering transport of cargo for the construction, as well as renting out annexes for navvies; others made money as traders. As with all such construction areas, many legal and illegal pubs and brothels were established. After construction was completed, some moved on, while others settled in the area; many of these received jobs with the railway company.

=== Hell–Sunnan ===
In 1872, Ole Tobias Olsen proposed in Morgenbladet that a railway be built between Mo i Rana via Haparanda, Sweden, to Saint Petersburg, Russia. He was inspired by Scottish railways and hoped to use the line to export fresh fish. The engineer succeeded the following year at gaining a public grant to investigate a route to Gulf of Bothnia. Om 1875, Olsen proposed that a railway be built from Trondheim via Steinkjer and Namsos to Vestfjorden. That year, Nord-Trøndelag County Council established a committee to plan a railway from Stjørdal to Namsos, while Nordland County Council established a committee for a continuation of the line to Nordland.

On 23 August 1876, the Nord-Trøndelag committee published a report to encourage national authorities to consider the line, which resulted in surveying starting in 1877. On 27 April 1881, the committee made its recommendation to the county council and ceased its work. However, it was not until 1889 that the county council appointed a new railway committee, which was led by Wexelsen. In 1891, the county's road committee, led by Øverland, sent an official request to the railway committee, asking for details about their plans, so the appropriate roads could be planned. This spurred the committees work and a cooperation with Nordland County Council was initiated to increase the projects priority by national politicians. The railway was also regarded as having a strategic importance for the postal service and the military, as transport times northwards would decrease significantly and be less affected by severe weather, which particularly during winter could hinder efficient steam ship transport.

On 2 March 1896, with 87 against 27 votes, Parliament passed legislation approving a railway from Hell to Sunnan. Costs were estimated at 8.75 million Norwegian krone (NOK), of which 15 percent was to be financed with local grants and the remainder by the state. Construction was scheduled to take 15 years. The decision initially called for the railway to be built in two stages, with the split at Rinnan in Levanger—the site of the military camp Rinnleiret. Final approval of construction was made by Parliament on 11 June 1898. The choice of route through Innherred was largely without much debate, as the line naturally went through all the towns and most of the important villages. Sunnan was a natural place to halt construction, as it is located at the foot of the lake of Snåsavatnet, allowing connection with steam ships.

Hell Station had to be rebuilt, and the old station building was moved to Sunnan Station. Controversies arose over the location of Skatval Station, Levanger Station, Verdal Station, Sparbu Station, with the initial discarding of Mære Station, and Steinkjer Station. The line through Steinkjer was controversial, as the proposal would split the town in two, and there was an intense debate as to which side of the river the station should be built on. A counter-proposal which saw the line run further up and cross through Steinkjersannan and Furuskogen—and thus avoid the town itself—was discarded because it would wreck the military camp at Steinkjersannan and would be located too far from the port.

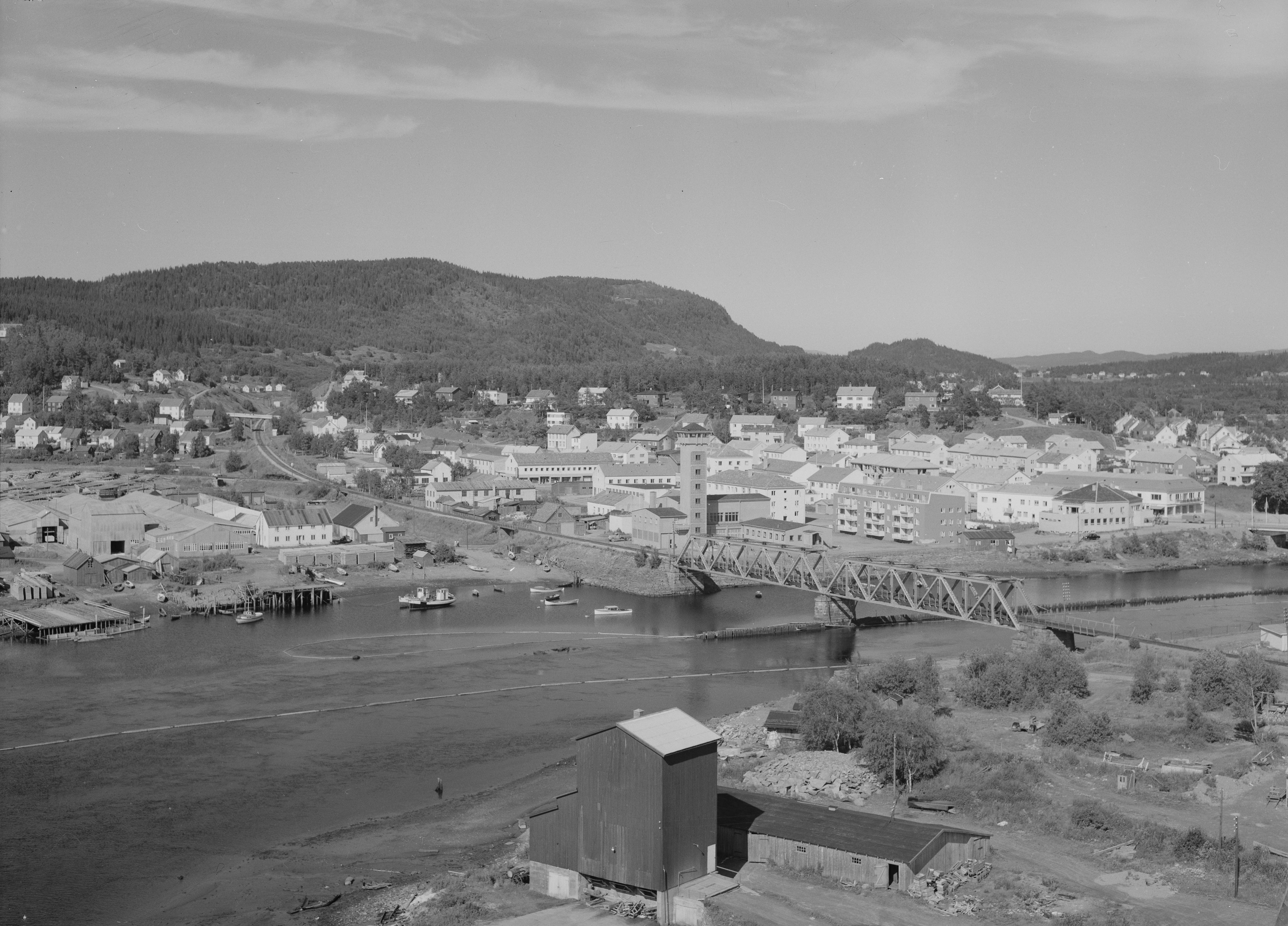
The line through Steinkjer in 1956

Four navvies were killed during construction, three in a landslide in a trench and one by a piling log, all in Levanger. Construction on the line's second part, from Levanger to Sunnan, started in 1901. Part of the reason for the early start was to help employ older navvies who were working on the southern section during the summer. At Røra, a spur was originally planned to Hylla, but this was discarded late in the planning phase. At Hellem in Inderøy the right-of-way had to be moved because of poor soil mechanics. There were similar issues north of the Lunnan Tunnel, forcing the tunnel to be extended and a supporting being built. Steinkjer is surrounded by a moraine which had to be traversed with a cutting, 85 meters (279 ft) long and up to 21 meters (69 ft) deep. 125,000 cubic meters (4,400,000 cu ft) of earthwork was removed, half with a steam shovel, and largely used to build reclaimed land for the railway's right-of-way through Steinkjer.

The 3.0-kilometer (1.9 mi) long section from Hell to Stjørdal started revenue service on 1 February 1902. The 49.4-kilometer (30.7 mi) long section from Stjørdalshalsen to Levanger was officially opened on 27 October 1902, with ordinary services starting on 29 October. The 12.4-kilometer (7.7 mi) long section from Levanger to Verdal was opened on 1 November 1904, although the station building was not completed until 1905. At the time there were two trains per direction per day, one passenger train and one post train. The official opening of the 40.4-kilometer (25.1 mi) long section between Verdal and Sunnan took place on 14 November 1905. Revenue service started the following day.

=== Gullsmedvik–Storforshei ===
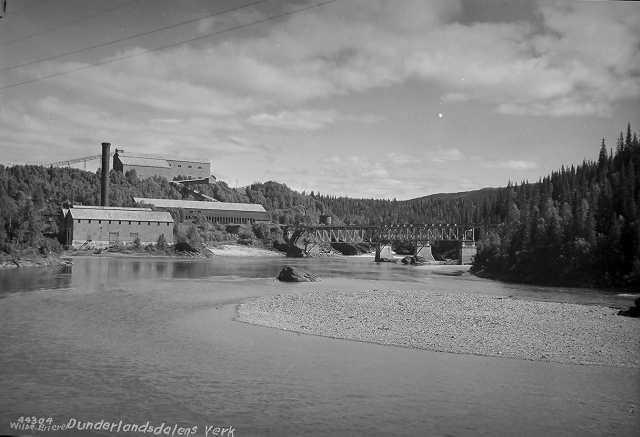
The Dunderland Line as it reaches the mines at Storforshei in 1936

In 1896, Olsen applied for a concession to build a railway up the Dunderland Valley to connect his mining claims to Mo i Rana, but this was rejected by the state. However, in 1902, the Dunderland Iron Ore Company started building a private railway to connect its mine at Storforshei to their port at Gullsmedvik in Mo. It was officially handed over from the construction company on 1 November 1904. Revenue service started in 1906. The mine only operated in three short periods, from 1906 to 1908, from the mid-1920s to 1931 and from 1937 to 1939.

=== Sunnan–Grong ===
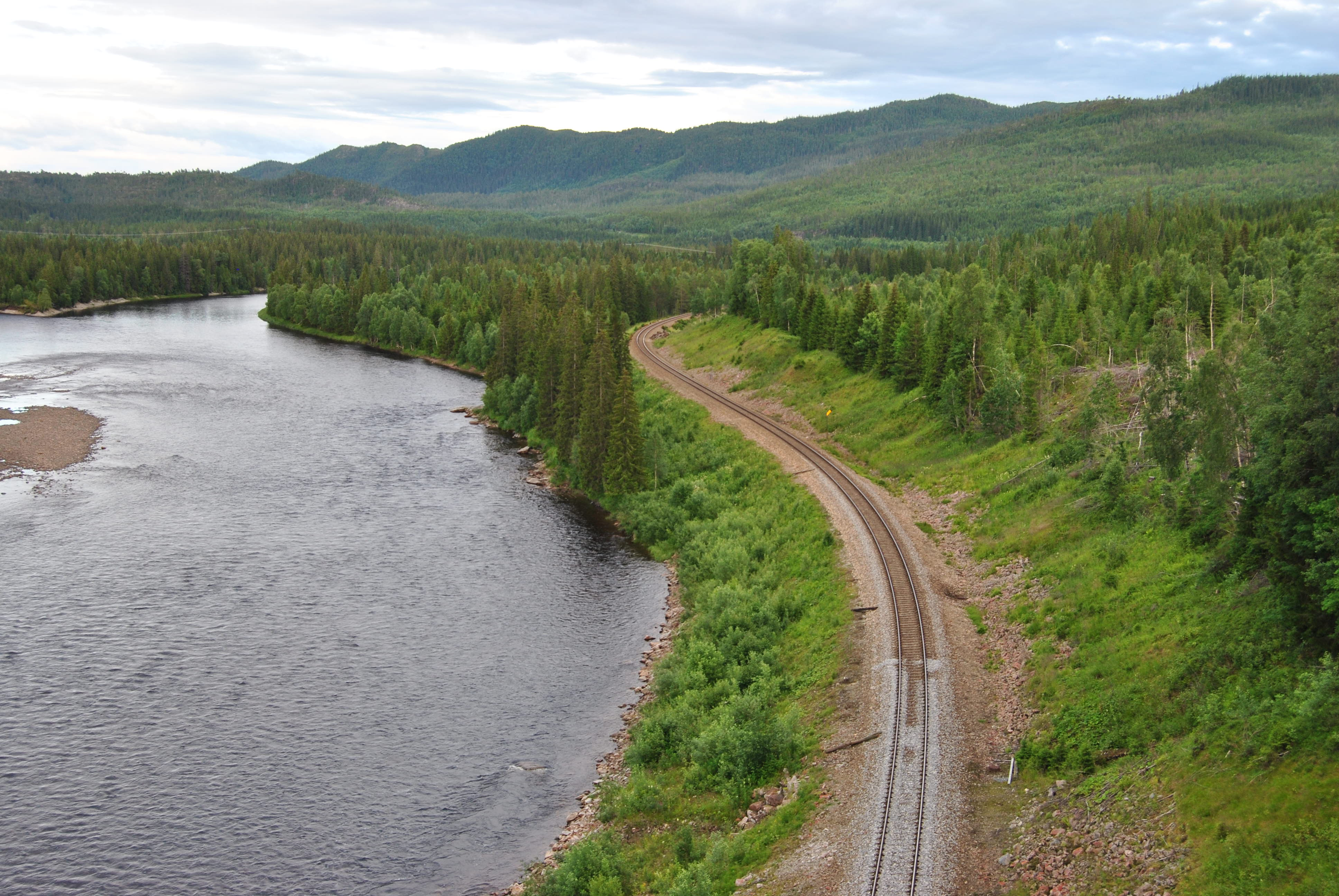
The line and Sandøla just before reaching Formofoss

The original proposal called for the line to run from Steinkjer via Beitstad to Namsos and onwards to Nordland. Connecting Namdalen to the railway network was seen as important to ease export both of lumber, farm produce and seafood. In 1877, Grong Municipal Council instead proposed building the Nordland Line from Steinkjer via Snåsa to Grong and instead build a branch from Grong to Namsos. In an 1892 report, a line from Trondheim via Beitstad to Namsos was estimated to be 212 kilometers (132 mi) long and would take 6 hours and 40 minutes. In comparison, the steam ships at the time used 16 hours.

During the 1890s, public meetings were held throughout the area to rally support for public spending on the railway and for support for the most advantageous route for the local area. The Beitstad Line would run through areas with a population three to four times that of the Snåsa Line. All previous railway lines were built following the route which gave the most people a service, as this gave the best economic impact and would create more revenue for the railway, making it more profitable. Namsos was also the gateway to Nærøy Municipality and Vikna Municipality. On the other hand, the Snåsa Line would be 52 kilometers (32 mi) shorter. It was further argued that Beitstad did not need a railway as it was connected to the Trondheimsfjord and that a branch line to Namsos would be built anyway. All municipalities in Namdalen, except Grong, supported the Beitstad Line, while municipalities from Steinkjer and south supported the Snåsa Line.

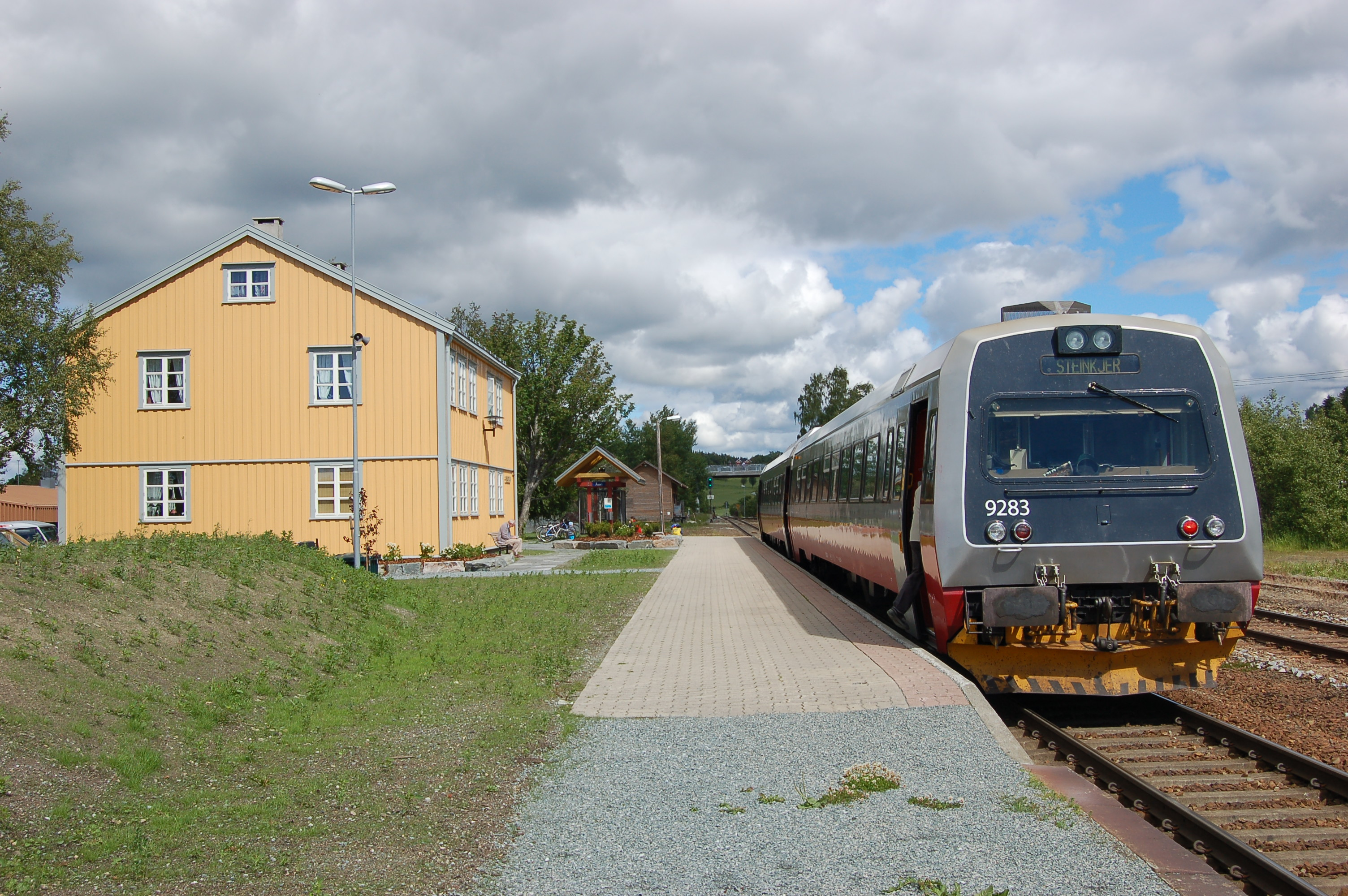
NSB Class 92 commuter train at Åsen Station

In 1899, the cost of a line from Sunnan via Namsos to Grong was estimated at NOK 11.68 million and would be 122.5 kilometers (76.1 mi) long. Conversely, a line from Sunnan via Snåsa to Grong would cost NOK 6.59 million and would be 79.2 kilometers (49.2 mi) long. In addition, the branch from Grong to Namsos was estimated at 4.28 million and would be 48.4 kilometers (30.1 mi) long. Thus the Snåsa Line would be 4.1 kilometers (2.5 mi) shorter and 824,000 Norwegian krone cheaper. Both routes were based on municipal grants of NOK 500,000. In 1899, a county railway committee published its recommendation, with the majority of three members recommending the Snåsa Line, while the minority of two members recommended the Beitstad Line. Nord-Trøndelag County Council voted over the issue on 13 June 1900, with 18 votes for the Snåsa Line and 12 for the Beitstad Line. The same year, Nordland County Council voted in favor of the Snåsa Line. In Nordland there was unanimous support for the Snåsa Line, as they wanted the Nordland Line to be as short as possible.

From 1905, the government started work on financing several large railway projects, including the Dovre Line, the Rauma Line, the Sørlandet Line and the Nordland Line. On 10 June 1908, Parliament unanimously passed these lines in the Railway Plan of 1908, which included the 79-kilometer (49 mi) long section from Sunnan via Snåsa to Grong, albeit without a branch to Namsos. The county stated that they would not grant any district funding to the line unless a branch to Namsos was also passed. This was a high-stake game, as Parliament could as a counter-measure decide to not built the line to Grong. In 1912, the Norwegian Directorate of Mining proposed a branch of the Nordland Line from Grong to Tunnsjøen, where pyrite mining was planned. The decision to build the Namsos Line was taken by Parliament in 1913. Work started in 1916 and it was opened in 1934. The main train service became a daily round trip from Trondheim to Namsos, using four and half hours to Grong.

=== Grong–Mo i Rana ===
Politicians in Nordland started work to get a railway to Nordland upon decision to build the Hell–Sunnan Line.

The line from Grong to Bodø was passed as part of a national railway plan approved by Parliament on 17 November 1923. This involved first building the 182-kilometer (113 mi) section from Grong to Mosjøen. The detailed plans were split between two routes, the first from Storforsen til Mosjøen approved the following year and the rest of the line in 1926. Due to high unemployment, work on sections at Spelruem and Gullsmedvik started in late 1923. The main route discussion involved where to run the line immediately north of Grong, where a detour was rejected which would have cut the length of the Medjå Tunnel. Grong received a station above the town in order to avoid clay deposits. Also in Brekkvasselv there were two route alternatives.

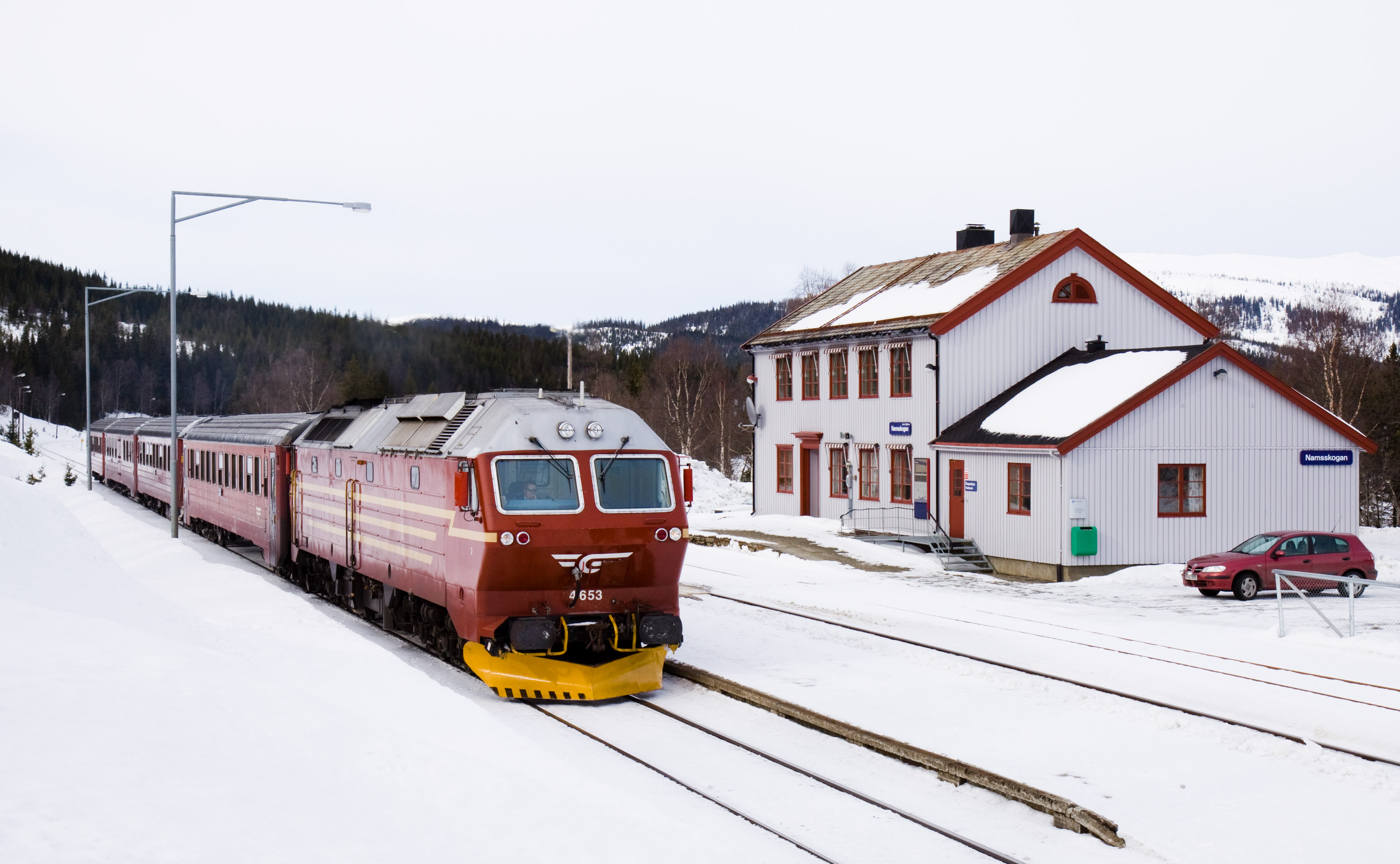
NSB Di 4-hauled passenger train at Namskogan Station

Construction of the tunnel commenced in 1926. Due to the line running through many sparsely populated areas, many of the guard houses were built early in construction to be used to house workers. By 1933 there were 869 men working on construction, rising to 1,744 three years later. Laying of track started around Brekkvasselv and Mosjøen in 1936. The line was built in NSB's highest standard, with 35 kg/m (70 lb/ft) tracks. The line as far as Mosjøen was planned to be opened in the fall of 1940, and to Elsfjord in November. The German occupation of Norway in April 1940 dramatically changed the pacing of construction. The Nordland Line was given high military priority and the order was given for imminent opening of the line. Three bridges were destroyed during the Norwegian Campaign and new temporary structures had to be put up to replace them or the damages repaired. Operations from Grong to Mosjøen started on 5 July with an official opening two days later. NSB extended the daily Trondheim–Grong train to Mosjøen. In addition military trains were operated as needed. Due to shortcuts in the hasty completion, full operating speeds were not reached until 1 July 1942. With increased use of the line, several Class 63 locomotives were imported from Germany for use on the line. Later Class 30 and 32 were used further south.

Work north of Mosjøen, on the 41.6-kilometer (25.8 mi) section to Elsfjord, started in 1935, based on a detailed plan approved by Parliament the same year. Proposals were made for the line running on either side of Elsfjorden, with the east side ultimately chosen. A major dispute on this segment was if the line should cross the fjord along Røssingtangen and on a bridge, but instead a 6-kilometer (3.7 mi) longer route around the fjord was chosen. Elsfjord Station was completed in 1938 to be used as a construction office. The Wehrmacht intensified construction on this section from 1940, and by July 1,950 people were working there, increasing to 4,966 people by September. Attempts were made to introduce work on Sundays, but this proved impossible to carry out as the workers just became tired. Futsa was crossed using a German-built bridge. A major hindrance to faster completion was the time needed to blast the final four tunnels. Temporary operation on the line to Elsfjord commenced on 15 March 1941. Without a rail or road connection onward, there was little practical use of this segment on itself.

Next focus shifted to completing the next 25 kilometers (16 mi) to Finneidfjord, including blasting of several tunnels north and south of Finneidfjord. The lack of roads near the route meant all supplies had to freighted in on the fjord. Food to the workers remained one of the most difficult logistical challenges, both regarding procurement and transport to the sites. Any conceivable short-cut was taken during the work if it could be allowed to speed up the opening date. Ties were cut into the ice during the winter instead of waiting for summer, and in the unfinished Falkmo Tunnel the ties were placed right on bedrock due to insufficient height. Blasting of Hattflåget Tunnel was particularly difficult, where lack of controls caused part of the tunnel to collapse during construction.

The segment to Bjerka Station opened on 21 February 1942. The section onward to Finneidfoss could not be opened due to a slide in a cutting north of Bjerka, caused by erroneous earth-moving techniques. To reach Mo i Rana a temporary segment was opened past Bjerka Tunnel, allowing the final part to Mo to open on 21 March. The station was far from finished. The missing 3 kilometers (1.9 mi) to connect to the Dunderland Line were quickly built, opening on 5 May. The poor condition of the track meant that travel time on the 92 kilometers (57 mi) from Mosjøen to Mo was three hours. Much of the work on this section had to be corrected and improved afterwards. An estimated 18 workers were killed on this segment alone.

=== Mo i Rana–Bodø ===
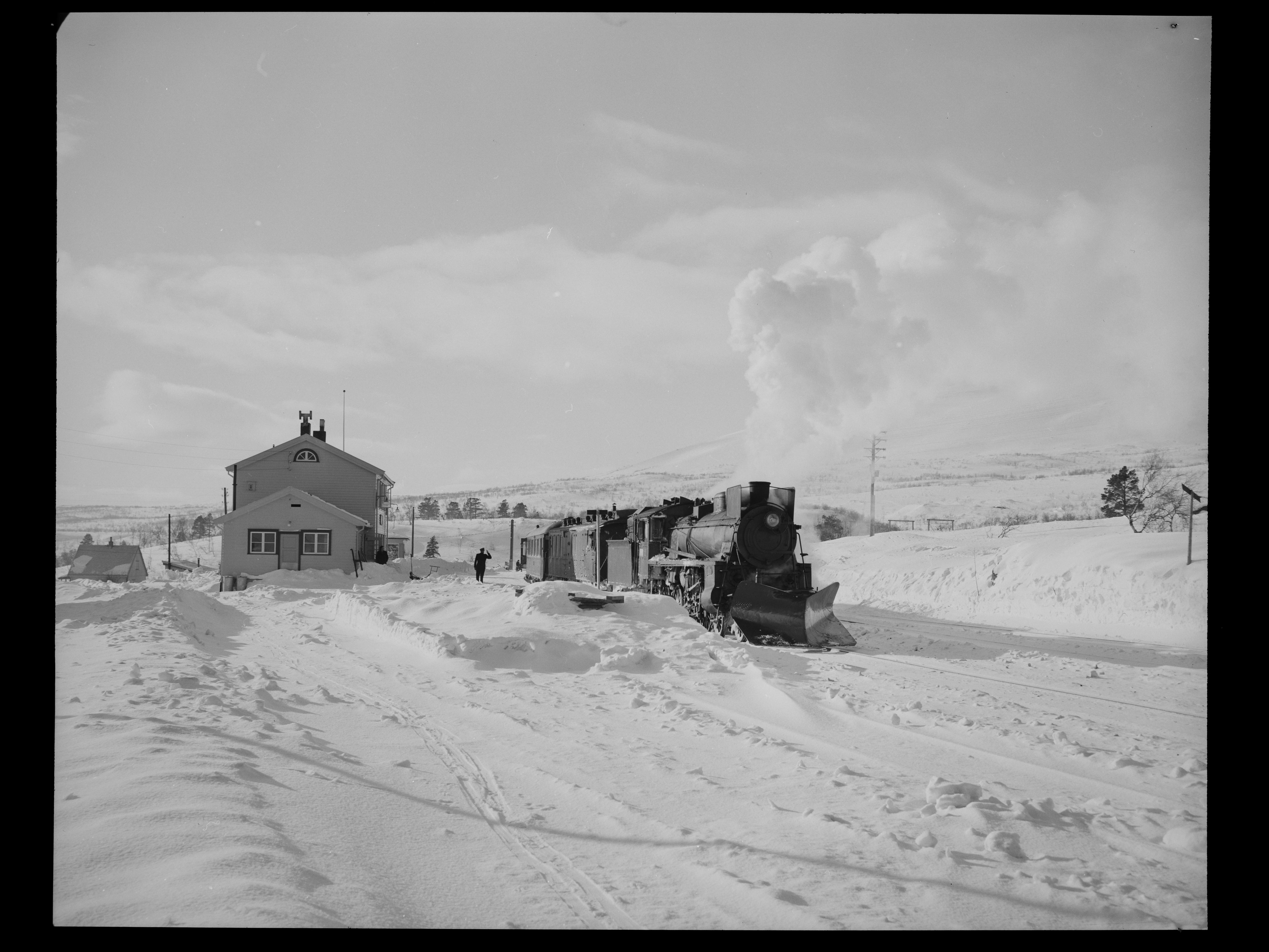
Lønsdal Station

The Wehrmacht had set a goal of ultimately extending the Nordland Line to Kirkenes. In early 1942 construction of two segments were started, north of Mo i Rana as well as the Polar Line which ran from Fauske and northward. This work was originally organized as part of Eisenbahnbaukommando Norwegen, with Organisation Todt responsible from March 1943. In addition to the Nordland Line, they were working on the completion of the Sørlandet Line.

Beginning in September 1942, the workforce was supplemented by prisoners of war. The number reached 21,600 on the Nordland and Polar Lines by 1945, distributed between 47 camps. An estimated ten percent of these died before the war ended. The 15 kilometers (9.3 mi) from Storforshei to Grønfjelldal was completed in April 1943. The last opening during the war was to Dunderland on 1 May 1945.

At the end of the war in May 1945, NSB took control over the construction. They shifted focus towards bringing the existing line up to standards. The Dunderland Line was bought by the state and taken over by NSB on 1 July 1947. Class 87 diesel multiple units were introduced between Elsfjord and Mosjøen, later extended to Majavatn, until 1951. An express train started running directly from Trondheim in 1949 and the next year a night train service was introduced. Sleeping cars to Mo i Rana were introduced in 1956, and to Mosjøen in 1970.

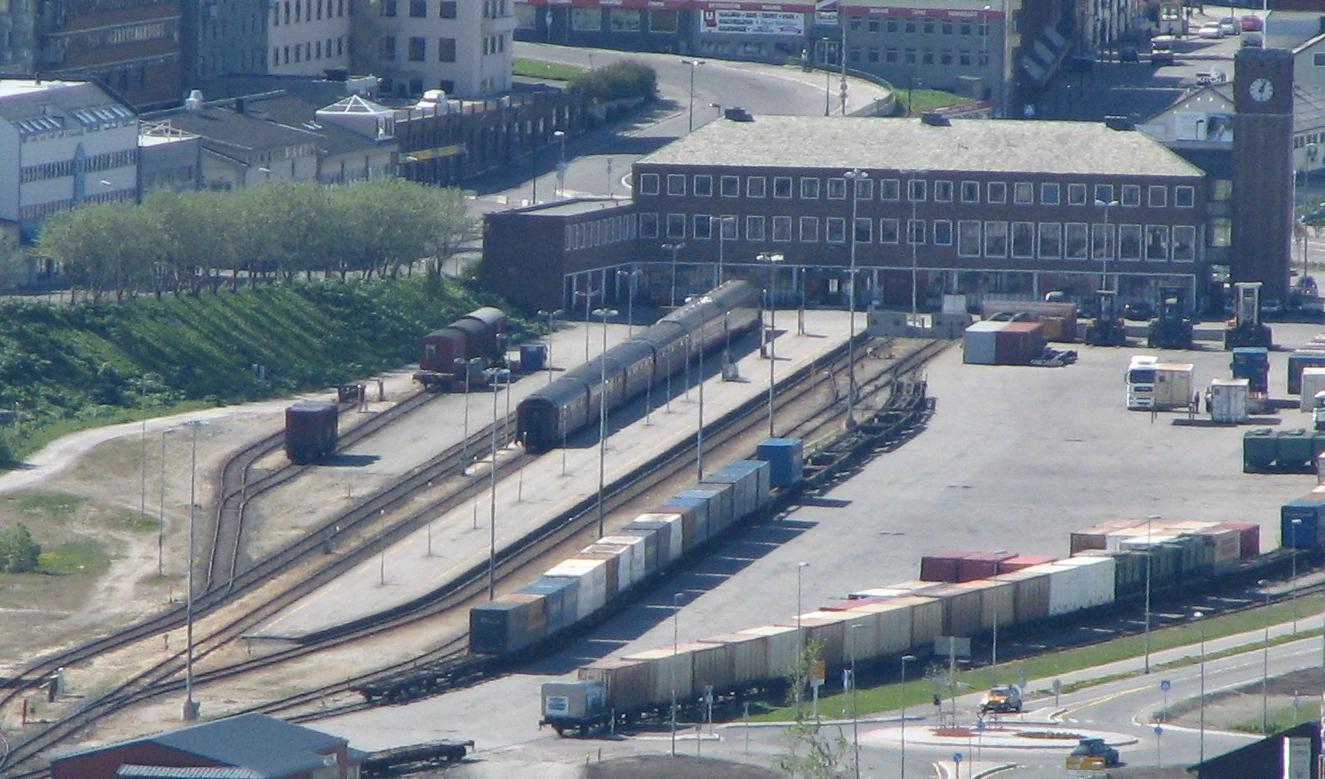
Bodø Station is the terminus of the line

The preliminary earthworking on route up to Lønsdal was finished by the end of the war, and this segment of the line could open on 8 December 1947. Work was carried out along the entire line until Fauske, and for instance, the bridge across Finneidstrømmen was completed in 1947, ten years before the line was taken into use. Once the war was finished the investments on the line fell dramatically. The next stage, to Røkland, was not opened until 1 December 1955. With this a direct freight and passenger train operated north of Mo i Rana, while previously all trains had been locals terminating there. NSB's first diesel locomotive, Di 1 was used from Trondheim to Mo from 1953. The following year also Di 3 locomotives were used, which gradually were taken into use on more and more trains. The line was finished to Fauske on 1 December 1958. At the time it had a common station with the narrow-gauge Sulitjelma Line at Finneid Station.

Because the Wehrmacht was not interested in a branch to Bodø, this segment of the line originally did not receive any work until 1946, albeit very limited until 1956. From the completion of Fauske the workforce was moved to the final stretch, peaking at 430 people in 1961. The 54 kilometers (34 mi) cost about 100 million kroner. Revenue freight service commenced on 1 December 1961, with passenger trains running from 1 February 1962. The official opening of the Nordland Line was carried out on 7 June 1962 by King Olav V.

=== Later operational history ===
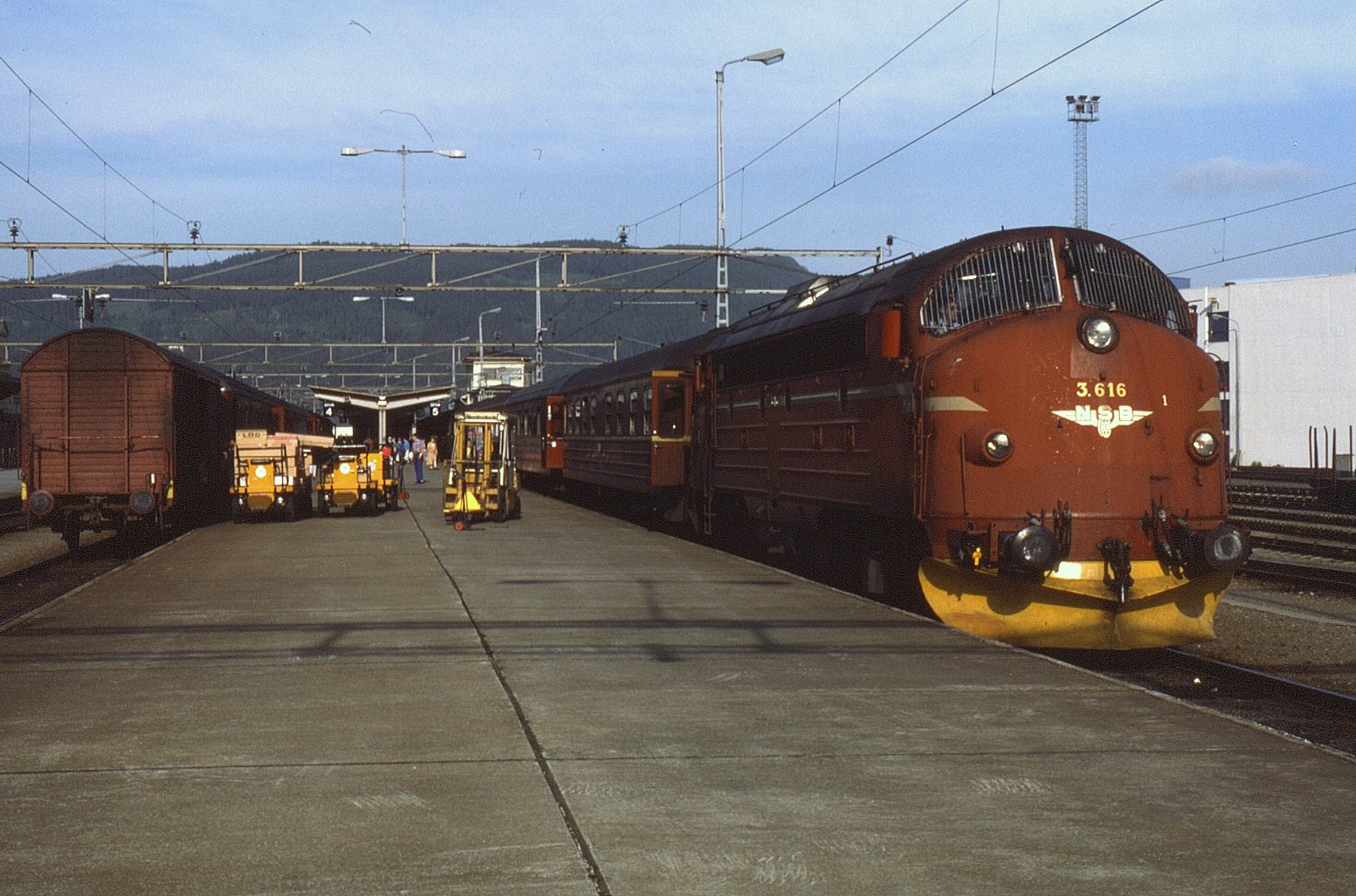
NSB Di 3-hauled day train awaiting departure from Trondheim Central Station in 1986

The mines at Storforshei reopened in 1964 and again needed to use the railway for transport, being hauled by Di 3s. Loading took place in a 700-meter (2,300 ft) tunnel. From 1983 the ore at Storforshei was depleted and mining moved to Ørtfjell, 13 kilometers (8.1 mi) further north. This required the construction of a branch line with a bridge over Ranelva. These initially consisted of 33 hopper cars pulled by two Di 3s.

During the 1960s the passenger trains were up to fourteen cars long, and would have to be hauled by two locomotives. Freight traffic increased beyond expectations with the opening of the Bodø extension. A direct freight train service from Oslo to Bodø was introduced in 1977, cutting travel time to 21 hours. It was mostly used for containers, which could then be transshipped to a north-bound ship service. Transport time to Tromsø was thus cut by 24 hours. Fauske received a container terminal two years later.

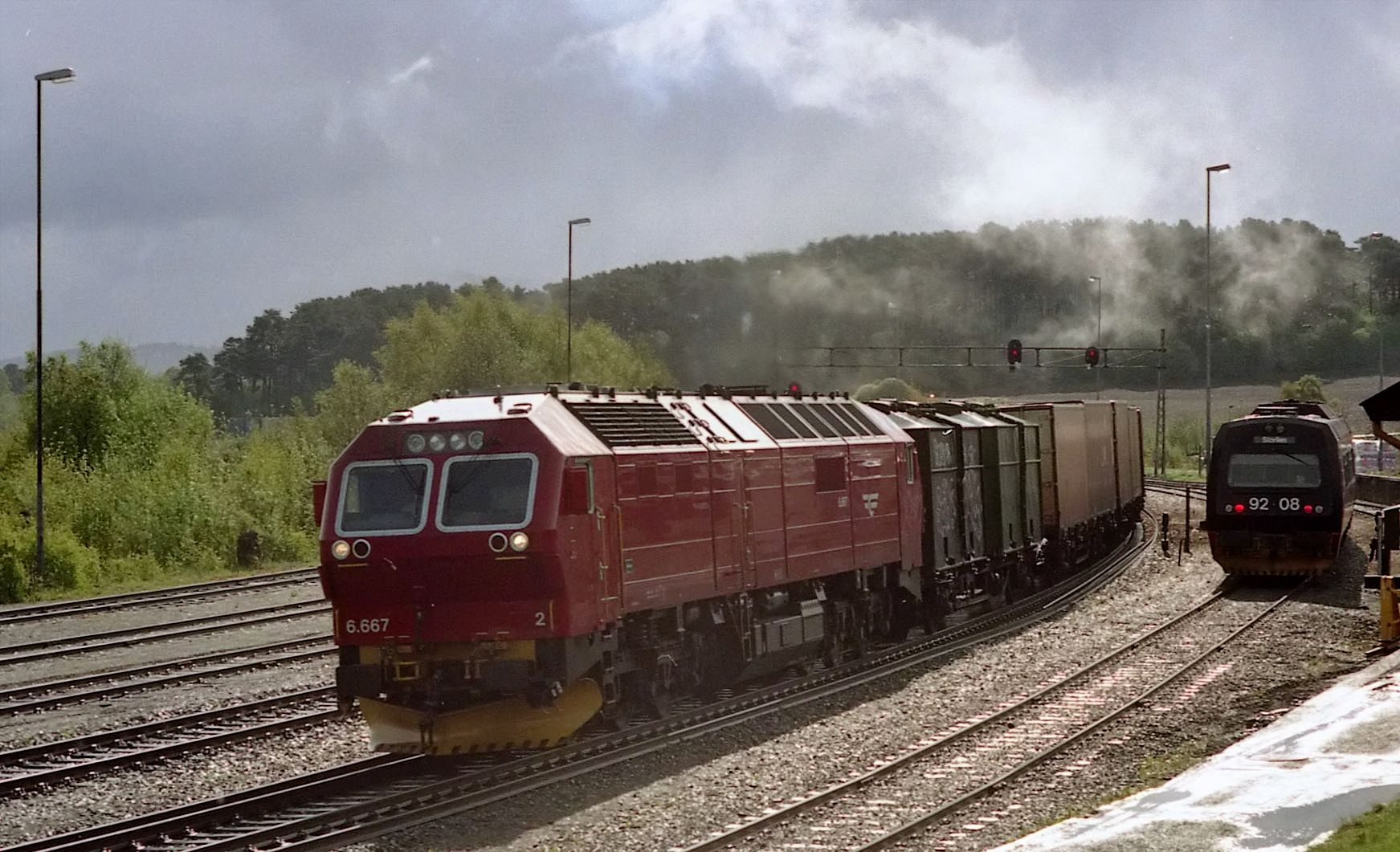
NSB Di 6 locomotive passing an NSB Class 92 diesel multiple unit at Leangen Station in Trondheim in 1998

The southern part of the line received centralized traffic control in four phases: from Trondheim to Stjørdal on 11 January 1976, to Levanger on 9 January 1977, to Steinkjer on 6 December 1977 and to Snåsa on 23 November 1984. Di 4-locomotives were introduced in 1981. At first they could only be used to Mo i Rana. After upgrades to the line further north, they could be used to Bodø from 1986. NSB introduced Class 92 diesel multiple units in 1985, cutting travel time on local services between Steinkjer and Trondheim by 25 minutes. A morning service from Mo i Rana to Trondheim with a return in the afternoon was introduced from 1986. A similar morning train from Mosjøen to Bodø with return in the afternoon was introduced from 1990.

NSB launched the Trøndelag Commuter Rail on 1 September 1993, of which the main service ran from Steinkjer to Trondheim. The initial plans called to the continued use of the Class 92 rolling stock, but saw change in schedules and the upgrading platforms for NOK 15 million. The service from Trondheim to Steinkjer had ten daily round trips. After six months operation, the service had experienced a 40 percent growth in patronage. This was further increased with the opening of Trondheim Airport Station on 15 November 1994 and a station serving Levanger Hospital on 20 December 1995. On 10 November 1994, the line received automatic train control. NSB was split up on 1 December 1996 and the ownership of the tracks and infrastructure was inherited by the Norwegian National Rail Administration, while the operation of trains was taken over by the new NSB. From 1994, Di 6 and Di 8 locomotives were introduced, but the Di 6 proved unreliable and returned to the manufacturer.

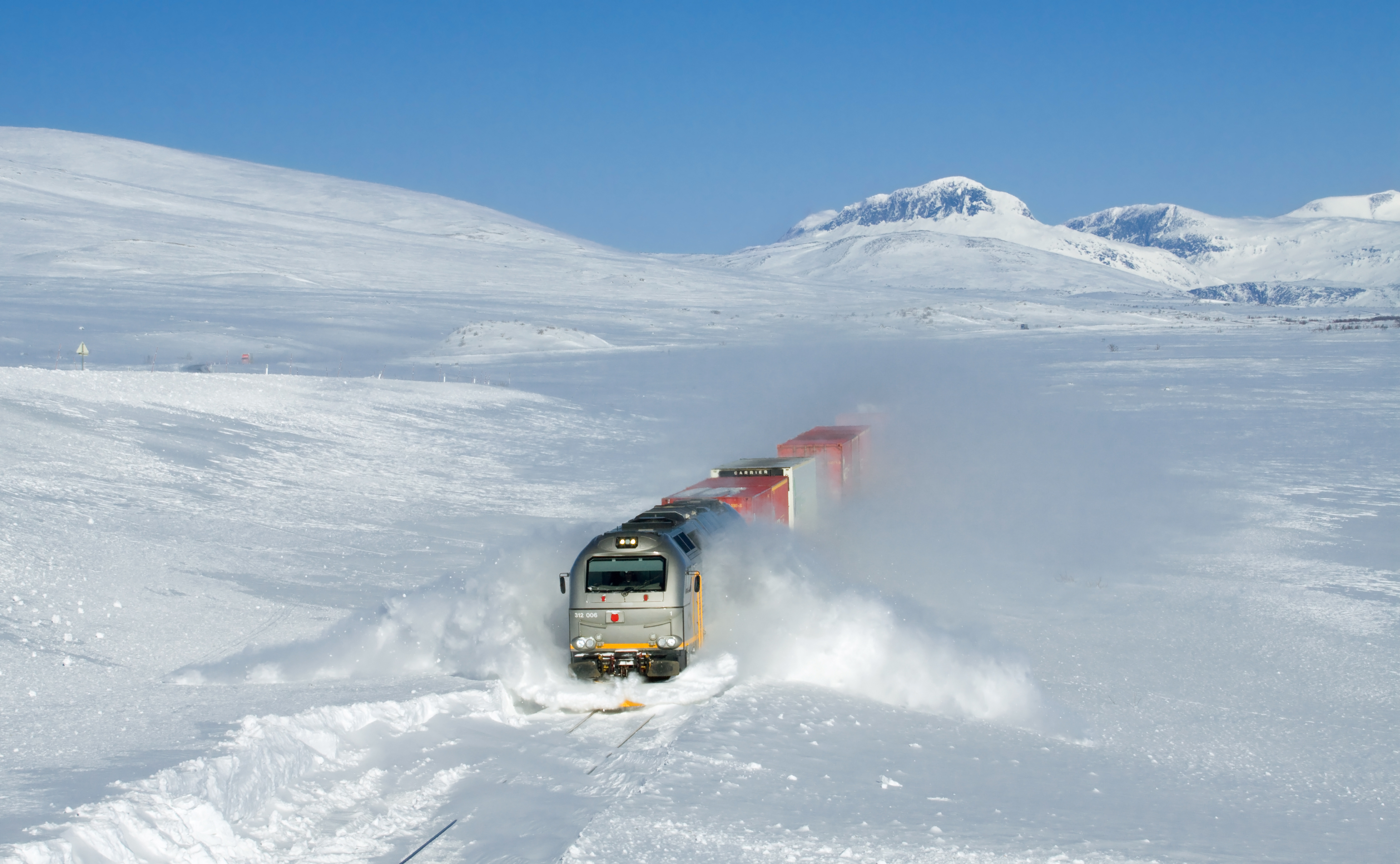
Vossloh Euro hauling a CargoNet freight train over Saltfjellet

NSB decided to improve their commuter rail service with the closing of several stations for the commuter train service. Fifty percent of the stations were responsible for only two percent of the traffic, and NSB instead wanted buses to transport people to the closest railway station, which would reduce overall transport time for most passengers. From 7 January 2001, a fixed, hourly headway was introduced on the trains from Steinkjer to Trondheim. From June 2001, NSB introduced additional rush-hour trains between Trondheim and Steinkjer, giving a half-hour headway. NSB introduced their Class 93 locomotives in 2001: starting on 7 January they were used on the Salten Commuter Rail, which ran a higher frequency of departures between Rognan and Bodø. This service has become a success. This was not the case when the same trains were put in as replacements on the intercity trains. Although allowing for almost an hour faster travel, they had fewer amenities and little space. Passengers protested, and after trials from 2003, Di 4s with carriages were reintroduced during the summers from 2003 and all year from 2007. From 2006 the sleeper services were cut from Mosjøen and Mo i Rana.

The Nordland Line had not received NSB's first generation of train radio, Scanet, so was among the first lines to receive GSM-R from 1 December 2004. NSB's cargo division, CargoNet, introduced EMD Class 66 locomotives from 2003. These were replaced with Vossloh Euro in 2010. Centralized traffic control from Grong to Majavatn was implemented in 2007, and to Eiterstraum from 2011. The same year the 5-kilometer (3.1 mi) Gevingåsen Tunnel opened south of Trondheim Airport. The newer B5 carriages were introduced on intercity trains in 2012.

== Architecture ==
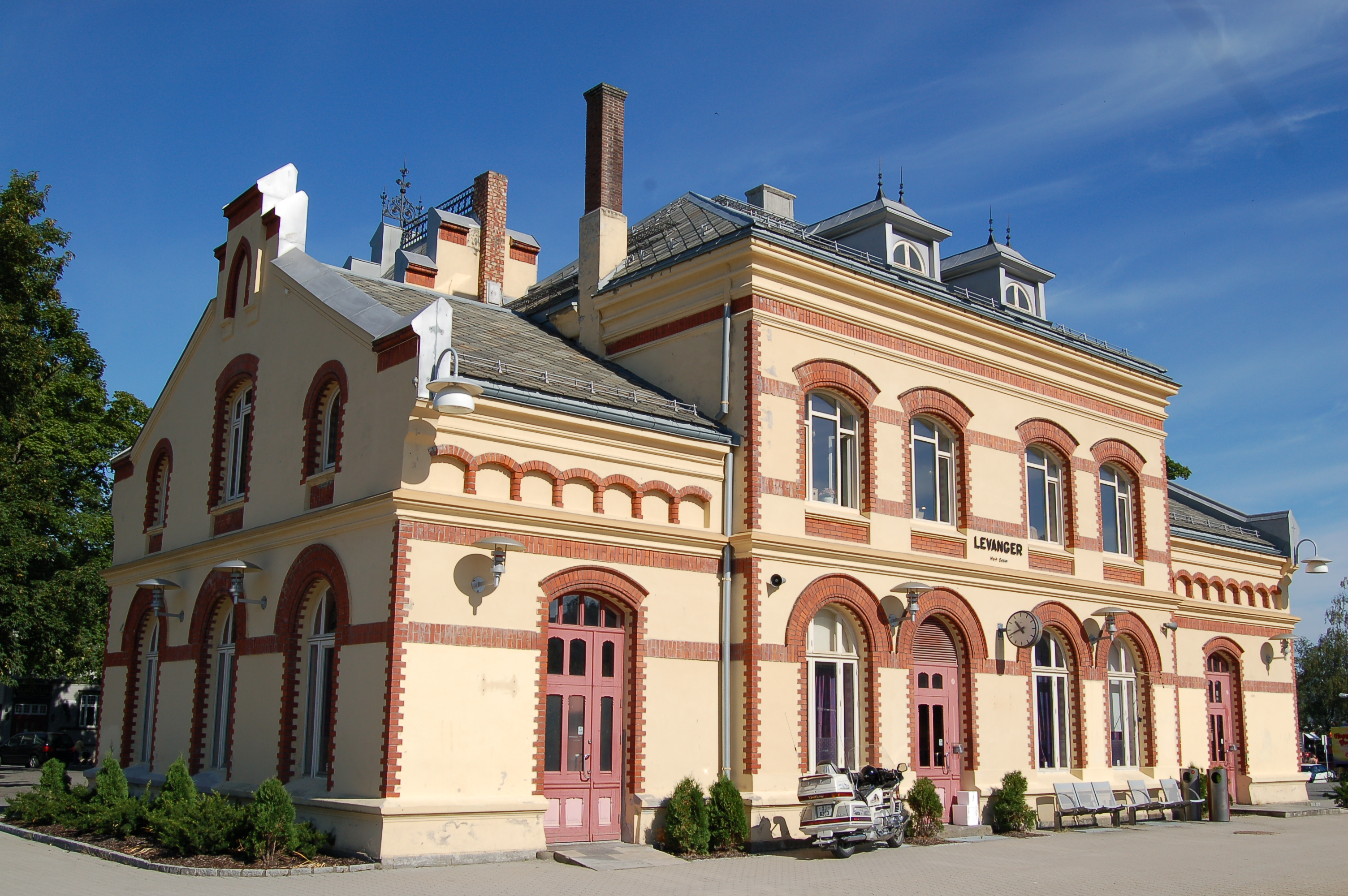
Levanger Station was designed by Paul Due in brick and is among the most monumental along the line.

Buildings along the Meråker Line, and hence the stations from Trondheim to Hell, were designed by Peter Andreas Blix. The stations bear resemblance to other Norwegian stations from the era, Few of these buildings remain intact, as they have mostly been expanded later. Blix' buildings were freer modeled, often taking an asymmetrical shape to suit its function. Stylistically the buildings have Medieval and New Gothic inspiration. The exception is Trondheim Central Station, a plastered brick building designed by Balthazar Lange in New Renaissance style.

Stations along the Hell–Sunnan Line were designed by Paul Due. These had a more grandiose expression, which stylewise represent a transition between Swiss chalet style and Dragon Style on the one hand and Art Nouveau on the other. Many of the smaller stations received a ground floor in stone and an upper story in wood. Steinkjer and Levanger were both built in plastered brick.

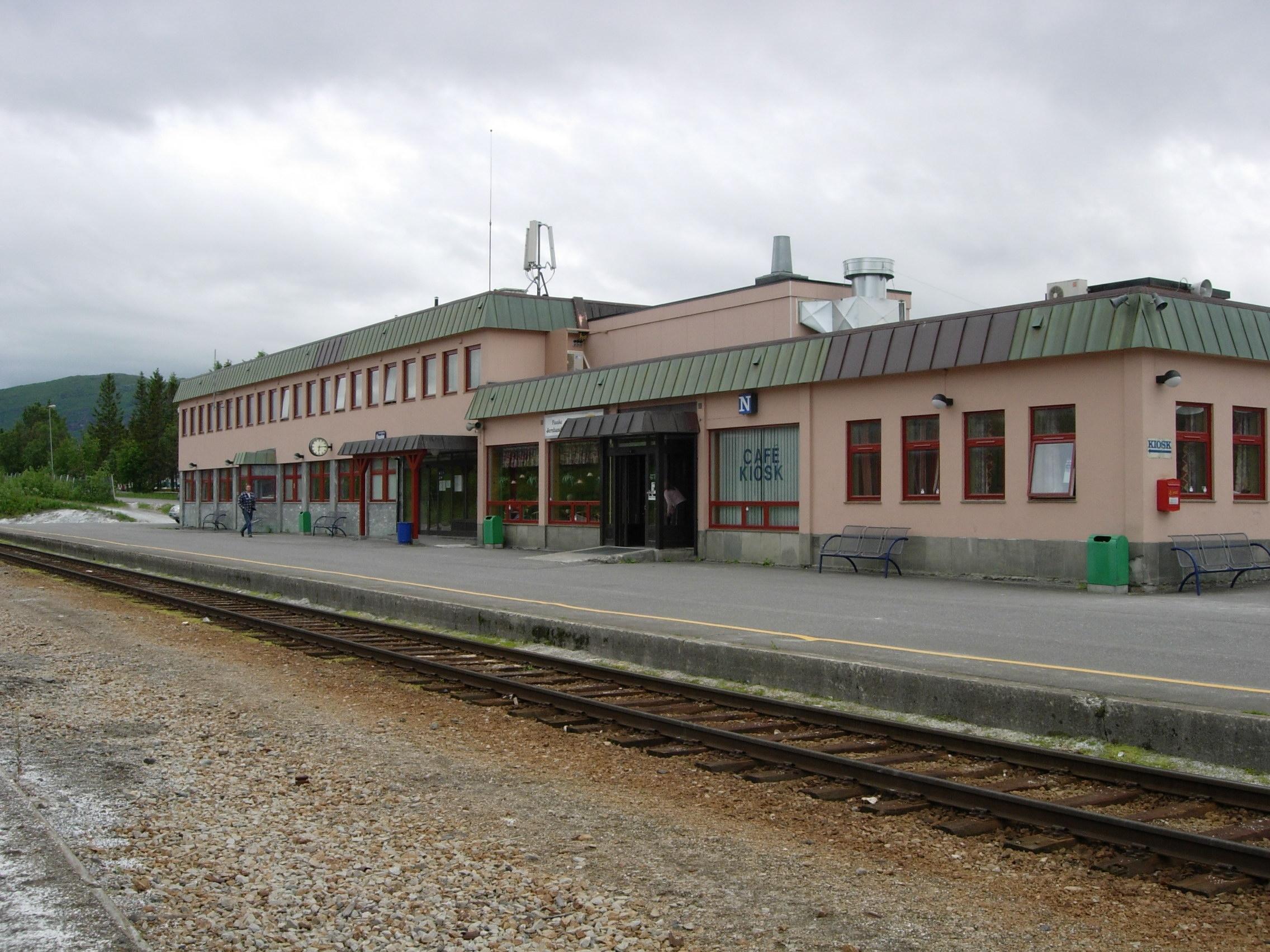
Fauske Station, terminus from 1958 to 1962, had a plainer style in concrete.

The section from Sunnan to Grong was designed by Eivind Gleditsch and in a transitional style between Historicism and Neo Classism. Increased standardization had been taken into use and the so-called Veggli Class or variations of it were used on most smaller station through Namdal. As the line continued northwards, reduced spending on architectural elegance caused simpler and simpler designs in wood. Once the line reached Salten it was evident that steam traction would soon be history and the functional layout of the stations changed. In Salten the smaller stations typically received a concrete ground floor and a wooden upper floor. The more monumental stations were Fauske in concrete and Bodø in brick.

== Route ==
=== Hell−Bodø ===
Hell station at the mouth of Stjørdalselva at the eponymous Stjørdalsfjord (part of Trondheimsfjord) is left northwards via Trondheim airport and the line crosses over to Åsenfjorden through the coastal hinterland. Vuddudalen is then used as natural corridor to Åsen, from where the Skogn area, still at the Trondheimsfjord, is reached. Further north, the route runs along the eastern shore of the aforementioned fjord, partly inland, via Verdalsøra to Steinkjer, which marks one end of Beitstadfjorden. Coming up Snåsavatnet, where Nordland Line runs alongside the southern shore to Snåsa. From here on, the line crosses over to Namdalen, having been built around Snorronfjellet on its way to Formofoss (and Grong). The Namsen valley corridor is left after about 100 km further north at Smalåsen, where the Nordland Line changes to the Vefsna river corridor until Mosjøen, located at Vefsnfjord.

To get to Mo i Rana, the route crosses inland over Drevjedalen valley, passing by Drevvatnet, in order to reach Elsfjord at the eponymous fjord and runs alongside its coastline via Bjerka to the main branch of Ranfjorden, where the mouth of Ranelva is located right at the fjord's northern end, in Mo i Rana. Ranelvas valley acts as traffic corridor both for European route E6 and the railway and it then leads up to the crossing of Polar circle an, a little bit northwards, the line's summit at about 700m above sea level (Saltfjellet). Downhill, Saltelva valley is used until Rognan at Saltdalsfjorden. Again, the route runs alongside a fjord's flank northwards to Fauske, where it changes direction westwards to reach the end, Bodø.

== Operations ==
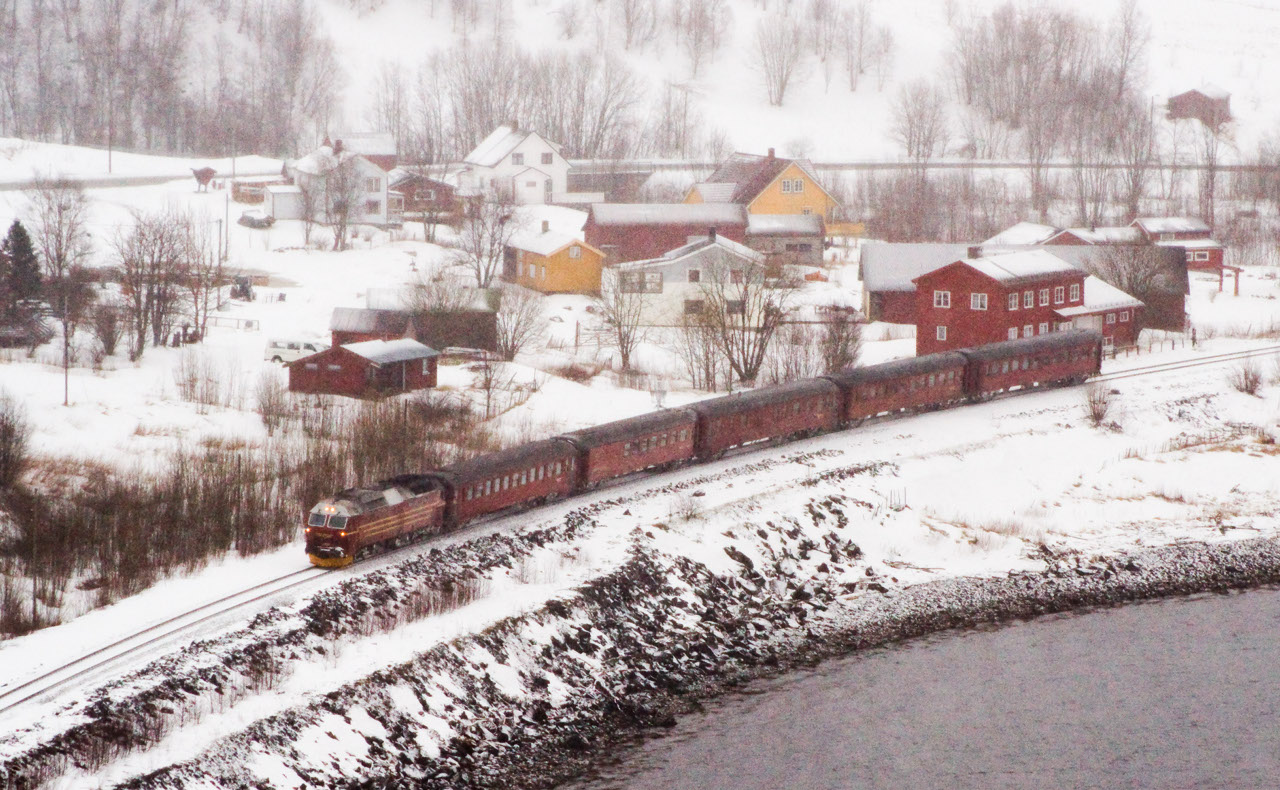
Passenger train at Setså

There is a mix of both local, regional and long-distance passenger and freight traffic on the Nordland Line. SJ Norge operate a daily intercity through service between Trondheim and Bodø, supplemented with a night service on the same route. These are operated using Di 4 locomotives with B5 carriages. SJ also operates morning trains from Mo i Rana to Trondheim, and from Mosjøen to Bodø, with return in the afternoon. There are also seven additional trains in each direction from Rognan or Fauske to Bodø. These are all operated with Class 93 multiple units. Travel time between Trondheim and Bodø is 9 hours and 50 minutes, while the commuter service from Rognan to Bodø takes 1 hour and 5 minutes.

South of Steinkjer SJ operates the Trøndelag Commuter Rail. It operates with a fixed hourly headway with some additional rush-hour services, in total nineteen services per day. These run to Trondheim and onwards along the Dovre Line to Lundamo Station. Travel time from Trondheim to Steinkjer is 2 hours and 6 minutes. The services are operated with Class 92 diesel multiple units.

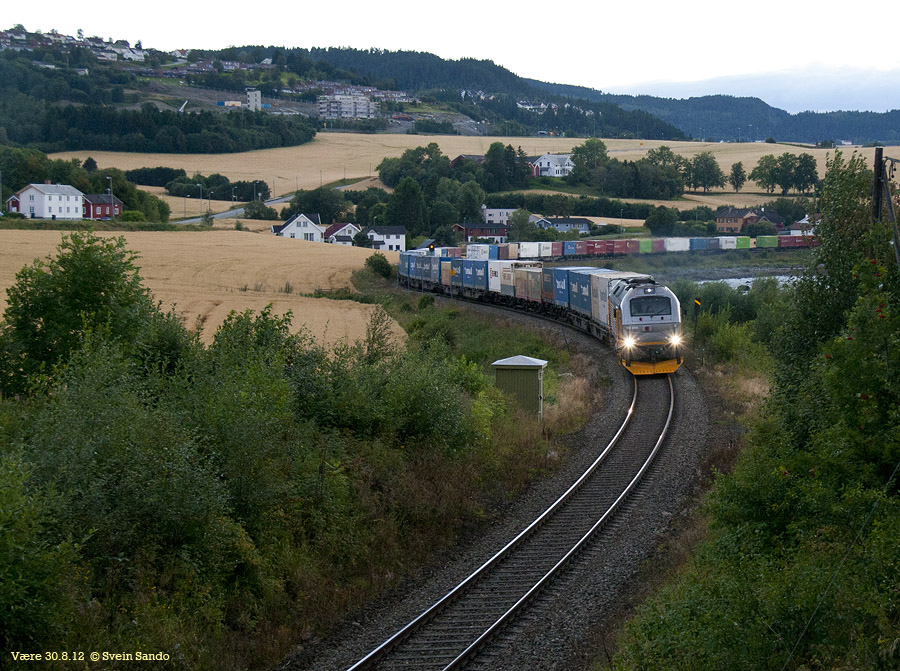
Vossloh Euro-hauled CargoNet freight train past Være in eastern Trondheim

Intermodal cargo trains are operated by CargoNet. They run from Oslo and Trondheim, unloading containers in Mo i Rana, Fauske and Bodø. Cargolink's trains also carry cars. CargoNet operates two trains per day, using 11 hours and 35 minutes from Trondheim, and 20 hours from Oslo. Cargolink operates once per week. Since 2011 they have also operate iron ore trains through the Dunderland Valley to Mo i Rana. The 3,400-tonne trains consist of 35 hopper cars of ore. These operate six times per day, each taking 45 minutes. There are also some lumber trains, mostly operating out of Formofoss Lumber Terminal. CargoNet hauls using Vossloh Euro, while Cargolink uses Di 6 locomotives, respectively.

=== Shortage of locomotives ===
As of March 2025 a shortage of locomotives was hampering train services on the Nordland Line. SJ Norge had to cancel night train services between Bodø and Trondheim. On Thursday 27th of February 2025, a newly repaired train performing a test drive hit a rock inside a tunnel, near Ørtfjell, south of Dunderland. The Nordland railway line was closed and trains were severely delayed. Officials from Bane NOR said they were lucky that the train that hit the rock in the tunnel was running with 2 locomotives, making it easier to restore train service on the line. They added however that there was only one locomotive left to serve the 726 kilometers long Nordland line.

Locomotives and train sets on the Nordland railway line were 45 years old, getting past their expected lifespan. With over 10 million kilometers on the clock, their ongoing maintenance, being in and out the workshop, created shortages, already before the train crash at Finneidfjord (see below). New trains are not expected to be delivered before the year 2030. Two freight train companies, Onrail and BLS Rails, both offered to rent one of their locomotives out to the Norwegian state, but Norske Tog was very slow in answering and decided to share their offer with journalists from public broadcaster NRK. A train set that had previously been offered as a gift to Ukraine, but had been politely refused for being too old, was later considered as a solution for the Nordland railway line, but Norske Tog deemed them to old to be re-entered into passenger service.

People living up north and local politicians were reacting with a demand for a minimum stable train service for Northern Norway. Passengers were complaining that even cashless vending machines onboard the trains were unusable, as there was no sufficient coverage of mobile internet around the Nordland railway line. Sølvi Andersen, leader of the Polar Circle Council, pointed out that new trains are not enough; The whole safety of the Nordland railway line needs to be overhauled. Passengers whose train was cancelled in January 2025 had to charter their own replacement bus, because SJ Norge had failed to offer a solution.

=== Nesvatnet landslide ===
A landslide caused a 10-month break in operation of the line, until June 2026 when a train traveled from Trondheim and past Nesvatnet - on its way towards Steinkjer.

Nordlandsbanen was interrupted on Saturday morning, the 30th of August 2025, because of a landslide at Nesvatnet lake in Levanger Municipality, in Trøndelag county, in Norway. This landslide, likely caused by quick clay, has left a big gap in the new E6 road, the old E6 road and the railway track Nordlandsbanen, between Åsen and Levanger, 63km (39 miles) northeast of Trondheim. One Danish man who was working at the site, preparing the construction of a second track to make passing of oncoming trains possible, is reported missing. Even though searching for the Danish railroad worker was still ongoing by next Sunday, he was not found and is feared to have lost his life in the landslide. As E6 is also cut off, busses to replace trains, if any busses were to be provided, are supposed to drive the long detour through Sweden.

== Accidents ==
The Nordland Line is exposed to landslides and rockfall in many places. Rocks on train tracks can derail trains or cause other accidents. Large parts of the Nordland Line are built on quick clay soils, that can suddenly destabilize, like the part that has collapsed at Nesvatnet-lake in Levanger municipality. (see above)

=== Train crash at Finneidfjord ===
On 24 October 2024 a train traveling from Trondheim to Bodø crashed into a large rock that had fallen on the track. The train derailed, sliding down an embankment, towards the road below, which is European route E6. The train driver was killed in this accident. Four passengers had to go to hospital. The rest of the 46 passengers escaped with minor bruises and were evacuated by bus. The locomotive's front end, some trees and smaller rocks ended up on the northbound lane of the E6, between Bjerka and Finneidfjord. Police had closed both Nordlandsbanen and E6 until further notice, to investigate the cause of the accident, evaluate risks of further rockslides and organize a towing operation for the derailed train cars.

The accident severed Norway's main arterial road, the E6, cutting Norway in two. One detour, using FV17, involved a ferry ship crossing between Levang and Nesna, with very long waiting times. The other detour ran along FV73 and European route E12, through Sweden. Both detours were lengthy and costly. Bane NOR announced on Sunday 27 October 2024 that they had to interrupt their attempts to clear the train wreck, because the mountain slope was still moving. SJ Norge announced that all trains were stopped and no replacement transport was made available for train passengers on the Nordlandsbanen between Mosjøen and Mo i Rana. On Monday 28 October 2024, BaneNOR announced that they did not expect to reopen Nordlandsbanen before the 4 November 2024.

Statens Vegvesen released new press releases almost every day, using new web addresses. Since the 6th of November 2024 the E6 road below the railway line had been reopened for traffic under guidance, with intermittent closures for up to half an hour, to allow for work on the tracks that could cause rockfall. Bane NOR has updated their press release several times, each time pushing forward the day for reopening the Nordland Line. Bad weather was delaying the salvage of the crashed train. By 11 November 2024 it was estimated that work to secure loose rocks above the railway line would continue till the end of November, before trains could run again on the Nordland Line. With each update, BaneNOR made the text of their old press release disappear. The last update of that chain of press statements was published on 25 November 2024. Train traffic for goods trains was restored on Saturday 30 November 2024 and the traffic restrictions on E6 were lifted, 51 days after the train crash near Finneidfjord. Passenger trains started running again on Monday 2 December 2024.

== Future ==
Two major developments have been proposed for the Nordland Line—electrification and installation of centralized traffic control (CTC). The latter is scheduled to take place as part of nationwide implementation of European Train Control System. The sections currently without CTC have the highest priority, with Grong–Bodø scheduled for completion in 2025 and Trondheim–Grong in 2028.

Between 2014 and 2018 the section of track between Hell and Trondheim Airport was rebuilt to double track and upgrade the two stations. Combined with other investments, such as double track onward from Hell to Trondheim and electrification, this would allow travel time from Trondheim to Steinkjer to drop to one hour. Electrification from Trondheim to Steinkjer, combined with that on the Stavne–Leangen Line and the Meråker Line, was scheduled to take place between 2017 and 2023. The project was delayed and ended late 2025.

A report from 2015 concluded that electrification of the rest of the Nordland Line would be profitable for society, but recommended that the Røros and Solør Lines be prioritized, as these could serve as reserve lines to the Dovre Line.

== Driver’s cab documentation ==
Multiple cab ride recordings on the Nordland Line document Arctic light, mountains, long gradients and remote terrain. Directory from Trondheim to Mosjøen:

== Bibliography ==
- Bjerke, Thor (1994). Banedata '94 (in Norwegian). Oslo: Norsk Jernbaneklubb. ISBN 82-90286-15-5.
- Bjerke, Thor; Holom, Finn (2004). Banedata 2004 (in Norwegian). Hamar / Oslo: Norwegian Railway Museum / Norwegian Railway Club. ISBN 82-90286-28-7.
- Ellingsve, Arvid (1995). Nordlandsbanens krigshistorie (in Norwegian). Oslo: Norwegian State Railways.
- Hartmann, Eivind; Mangset, Øistein; Reisegg, Øyvind (1997). Neste stasjon (in Norwegian). Gyldendal. ISBN 82-05-25294-7.
- Hille, L. M. (1892). Vestlandsbanen, Bergensbanen, Romsdalsbanen, Nordlandsbanen (in Norwegian). Oslo: Norwegian State Railways.
- Hjulstad, Ola (1990). Togstopp Namdal: jernbanehistorie for Namdals-distriktet og deler av Innherred (in Norwegian). Grong: Grong bygdeboknemd. ISBN 82-991903-3-9.
- Hoås, Jan; Stene, Morten (2005). Hell Sunnanbanen (in Norwegian). Jubileumskomiteen.
- Norwegian National Rail Administration (2009). "Railway Statistics 2008" (PDF). Archived from the original on 2 March 2012.
- Næss, Ståle (1999). Di 3: Billedboken om en loklegende (in Norwegian). BSN Forlag.
- Røe, Tormod (1982). Merakerbanen 100 år (in Norwegian). Historielaga i Stjørdalsføret. ISBN 8299087902.
- Ryssdal, Reidar (1996). Fra Hans Nielsen Hauge til Norges største industripark: historien om Norsk jernverk (in Norwegian). Mo industripark.
- Svanberg, Erling (1990). Langs vei og lei i Nordland: samferdsel i Nordland gjennom 3000 år (in Norwegian). Nordland County Municipality. ISBN 8274160215.
