= Rinnan =

Village in Levanger Municipality, Norway

- Village
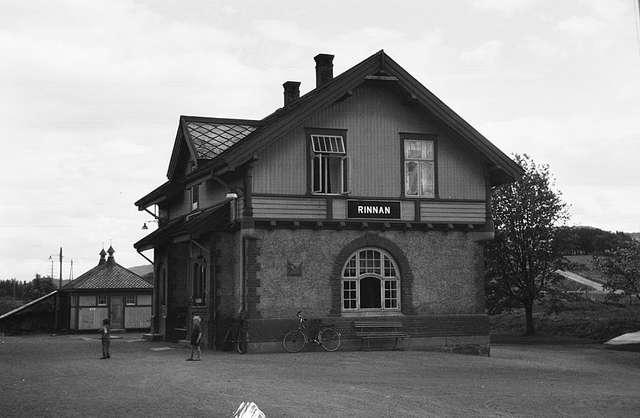
- View of the village railway station
- Interactive map of Rinnan
- Location within Trøndelag Location within Norway
- Coordinates: 63.7613°N 11.4384°E
- Country: Norway
- Region: Central Norway
- County: Trøndelag
- District: Innherred
- Municipality: Levanger Municipality
- Elevation: 14 m (46 ft)
- Time zone: UTC+01:00 (CET)
  - Summer (DST): UTC+02:00 (CEST)
- Post Code: 7600 Levanger

Rinnan is a village in Levanger Municipality in Trøndelag county, Norway. It is the site of the former military camp Rinnleiret and Rinnan Station, a station on the Nordlandsbanen railway line.
