= Sparbu Station =

Railway station in Trøndelag county, Norway

Sparbu Station Sparbu stasjon
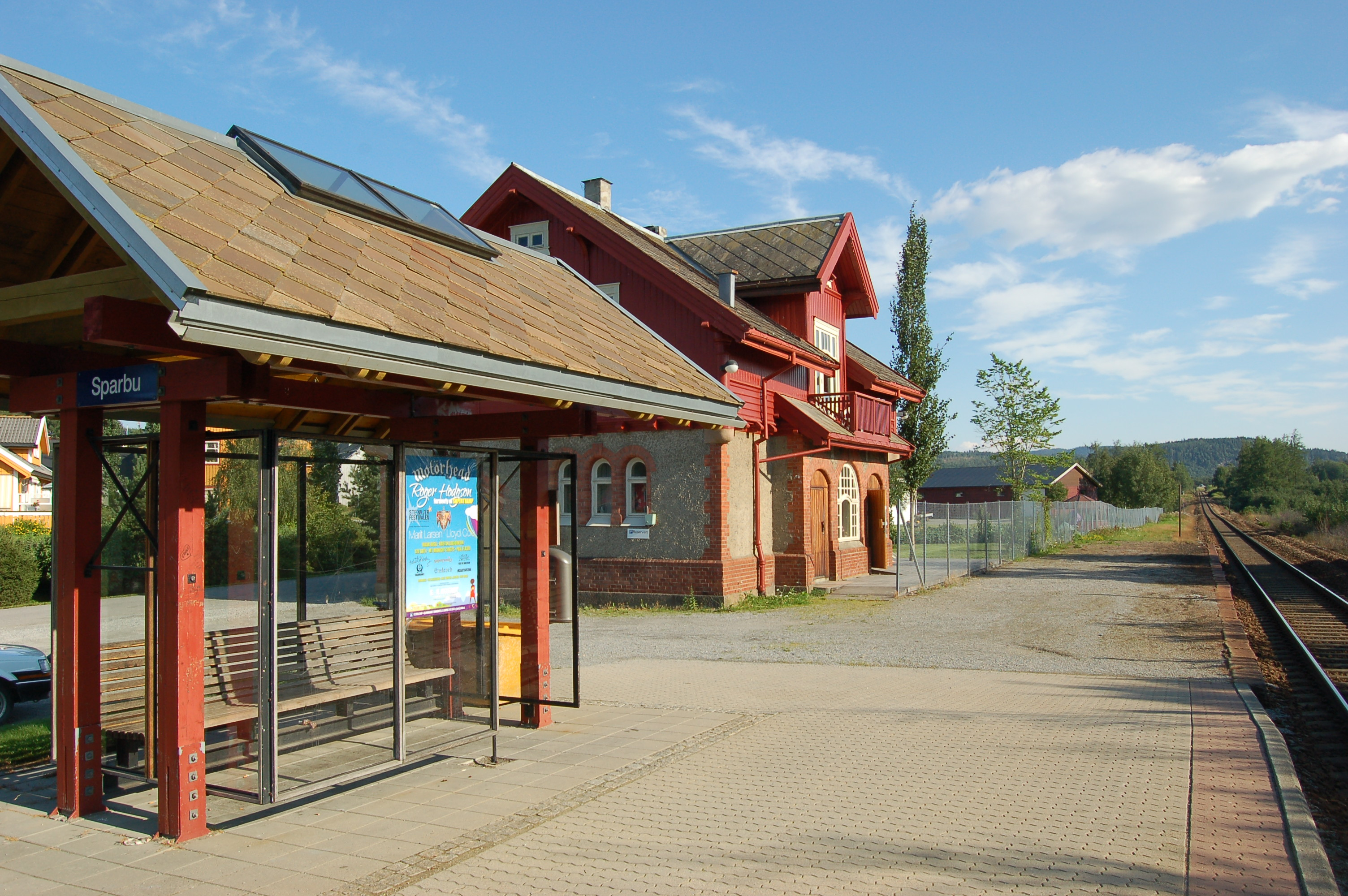
- View of the station

General information
- Location: Sparbu, Steinkjer Municipality; Trøndelag; Norway
- Coordinates: 63°55′7.73″N 11°25′43.32″E
- Elevation: 33.4 metres (110 ft)
- System: Railway station
- Owner: Bane NOR
- Operator: SJ Norge
- Line: Nordlandsbanen
- Distance: 112.93 kilometres (70.17 mi)
- Platforms: 1
- Connections: Bus: AtB

Construction
- Architect: Paul Armin Due

History
- Opened: 1905
Location
- Location within Trøndelag Location within Norway

Sparbu Station (Norwegian: Sparbu stasjon) is a railway station located in the village of Sparbu in Steinkjer Municipality in Trøndelag county, Norway. It is located along the Nordland Line and the station serves the Sparbu and Mære areas of the municipality. The unstaffed station is only served by the Trøndelag Commuter Rail service between Steinkjer and Trondheim, and is located near the E6 highway.

== History ==
The station was built as part of Hell–Sunnan Line and opened on 15 November 1905 along with the rest of the line north of Verdalsøra. The original station included three tracks, the extra two were 315 metres (1,033 ft) and 134 metres (440 ft) long, respectively. These tracks have since been removed and no passing is available at the station. Construction costs for the station were 68,753 kr and plans were drawn by Paul Armin Due. Originally, it was named Sparbuen, but on 15 January 1910, the spelling was changed to Sparbu. The station was staffed until 1980, and it has since been sold and the station building has been converted to a private residence.

=== Location ===
There was an extensive debate about the location of the station locally. Because the municipalities had to finance 15% of the investments in the railway, the municipal councils also got to determine important issues like the location of stations. The policy at the time was to allow one station for each municipality. The first debate was concerning the line through the municipality, where locals suggested two different lines both going further east to go via the settlement Lein where the only dairy and a local store was located. But the chief engineer of the project would not recommend either of the suggestions since they would be up to 2 kilometres (1.2 mi) longer, cost up to 30,000 kr more money, and go through more hilly terrain. So it was chosen to keep the original suggestion for a line from 1893.

Instead a major debate about the location of a station surfaced, with suggestions to place the station at Kåberg (what is now called Sparbu) or at Mære. Advocates for the Kåberg alternative felt that Kåberg was closest to the centre of the community. On the other hand, the Mære advocates felt that proximity to the new Mære Agricultural School was important. In reality, people chose the alternative closest to their own doorstep. The original plans also included a station at Vist. The city council voted to support the Kåberg/Vist alternative on 17 January 1900. But by the time it had reached the Storting (legislature), an alternative to replace the two stations with one at Mære was chosen, and on 5 June 1900 the Storting voted to only build one station in Sparbu, located at Mære. But locals pleaded their members of Storting to reconsider the matter, and on 24 April 1901, the Storting changed their decision to the original suggestion with stations at Kåberg and Vist. In 1904, the county engineer once again suggested moving the station to Mære for technical reasons, but the problems were overcome and two stations built, Sparbu Station and Vist Station. By 1917, Mære patriots had chosen to build the privately funded Mære Station.

Preceding station		Following station
Røra	Nordland Line	Steinkjer
Preceding station	Local trains	Following station
Røra	Trøndelag Commuter Rail	Steinkjer
