= NSB Di 4 =

Class of 5 Norwegian locomotives

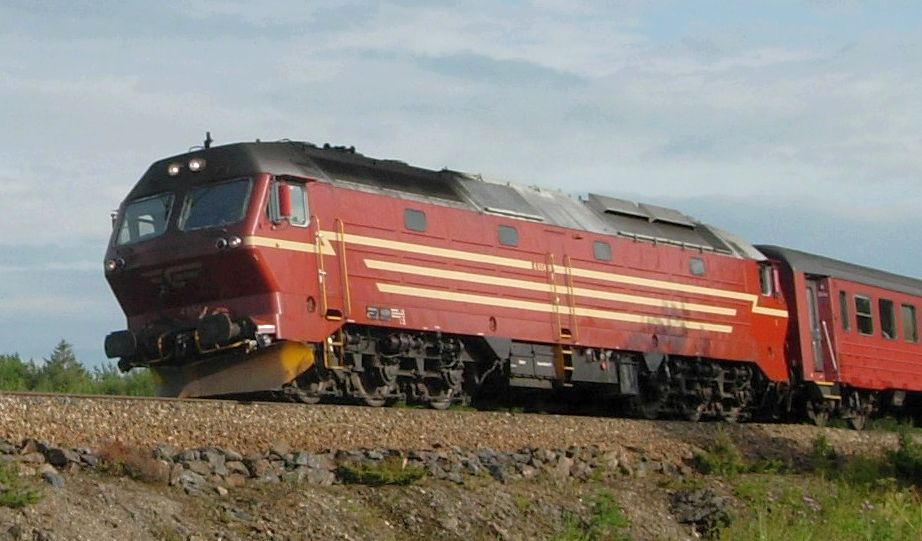
Type and origin
- Power type: Diesel-electric
- Builder: Henschel
- Build date: 1980
Specifications
- Configuration
  - UIC: Co′Co′
- Gauge: 1,435 mm (4 ft 8 1/2 in)
- Wheel diameter: 1,100 mm (3 ft 7 in)
- Wheelbase: 1,850 mm (6 ft 1 in)+2,000 mm (6 ft 7 in) (bogies 15.600 m (51 ft 2.2 in) (between outer axles)
- Length: 20.8 m (68 ft 3 in)
- Height: 4.35 m (14 ft 3 in)
- Axle load: 20 t (20 long tons; 22 short tons)
- Loco weight: 120 t (120 long tons; 130 short tons)
- Prime mover: EMD 16-645E3B
- Traction motors: NEBB QD 335N4A
- Cylinders: V16
- Cylinder size: 230.2 mm × 254 mm (9.06 in × 10.00 in) bore x stroke
- Transmission: Electric
Performance figures
- Maximum speed: 140 km/h (87 mph)
- Power output: 2,450 kW (3,290 hp) @ 900 RPM
- Tractive effort: 360 kN (81,000 lb_{f})
Career
- Operators: Norwegian State Railways SJ Norge
- Number in class: 5
- Numbers: 4.651 – 4.655

NSB Di 4 is a class of five diesel-electric locomotives built by Henschel for the Norwegian State Railways (NSB). Delivered in 1981, the class is used to haul passenger trains on the Nordland Line and are since 2001 the only revenue diesel locomotives used by NSB. The locomotives had electric components from Brown, Boveri & Cie and a General Motors Electro-Motive Division 16-645E prime mover. This gives a power output of 2,450 kilowatts (3,290 hp) and a starting tractive effort of 360 kilonewtons (81,000 lb_{f}).

The locomotives were ordered in the late 1970s as a supplement and later replacement of the Di 3. The class is technically similar to Denmark's DSB Class ME; it was planned to have commonalities with NSB's electric El 17 locomotives, but this was scrapped. The Di 4 was world's first asynchronous locomotive in revenue service. A second batch was planned delivered later in the 1980s, but the order was never placed.

== History ==
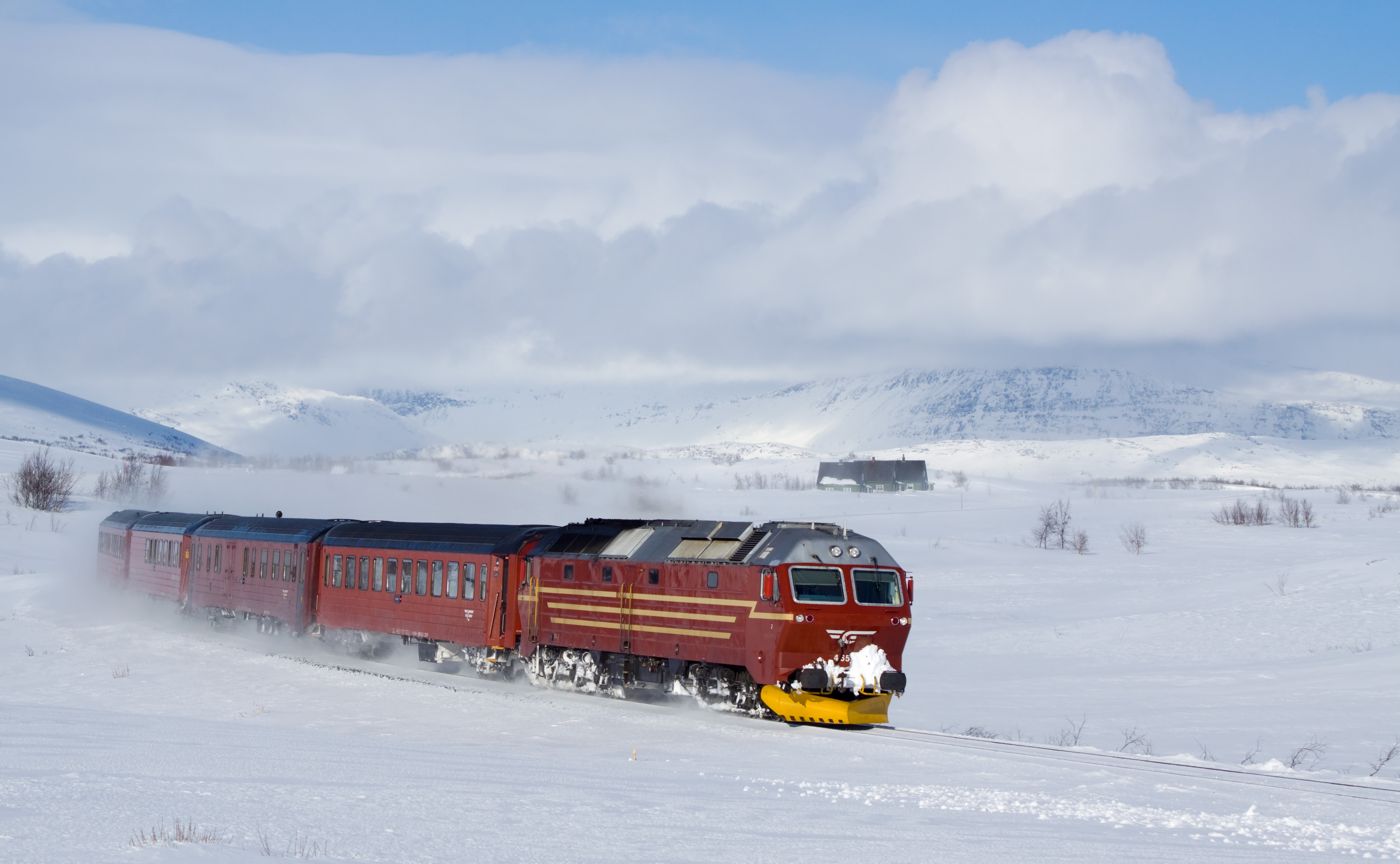
Di 4 hauling a passenger train over Saltfjellet

During the 1950s and 1960s, NSB took delivery of thirty-five Di 3 locomotives. The long-term plan during the 1960s called for an additional orders of Di 3s during the early 1970s, but this was never carried through. Instead, the state railways started planning of a new class. Construction was conducted by Kassel, Germany–based Henschel. The electric components were delivered by Brown, Boveri & Cie of Mannheim, Germany, while the engine-generator was delivered by General Motors. The Di 4 is technically similar to the Class ME procured by DSB in Denmark. Di 4 was the first NSB locomotive to have three-phase and asynchronous motors, and the world's first asynchronous locomotive in revenue service. Henschel was also building the NSB El 17; the two types were planned to use the same traction motors and rectifiers to increase commonality. This was however was discarded because the Di 4's components were too heavy for the El 17.

Delivery of the five locomotives took place in 1981. It was often run in multiple with Di 3. Di 4 has a higher axle load than Di 3, so from the delivery they could not be used north of Mo i Rana on the Nordland Line. By 1987, NSB was planning on an additional order of the class, with delivery in 1989 and 1990, but the order was never placed. The proposed order would have consisted of six to ten units, which would have received a modified ventilation system and a more powerful engine. Because of the time that had passed before a new order would have been placed, NSB was already looking for a more modern class, and placed an order for twelve Di 6 in 1992. The Di 6 proved too unreliable, and was returned to the manufacturer. With the retirement of the Di 3 in 2001, Di 4 remains NSB's only revenue diesel locomotives.

On 24 October 2024, Di 4 number 4.653 was involved in a fatal derailment on the Nordland line, while hauling a passenger train between Bjerka and Mo i Rana on a portion of line paralleling the E6 road. Preliminary investigations suggest the derailment was caused by rockfall. The train driver was killed in the incident, while four passengers were injured.

== Specifications ==
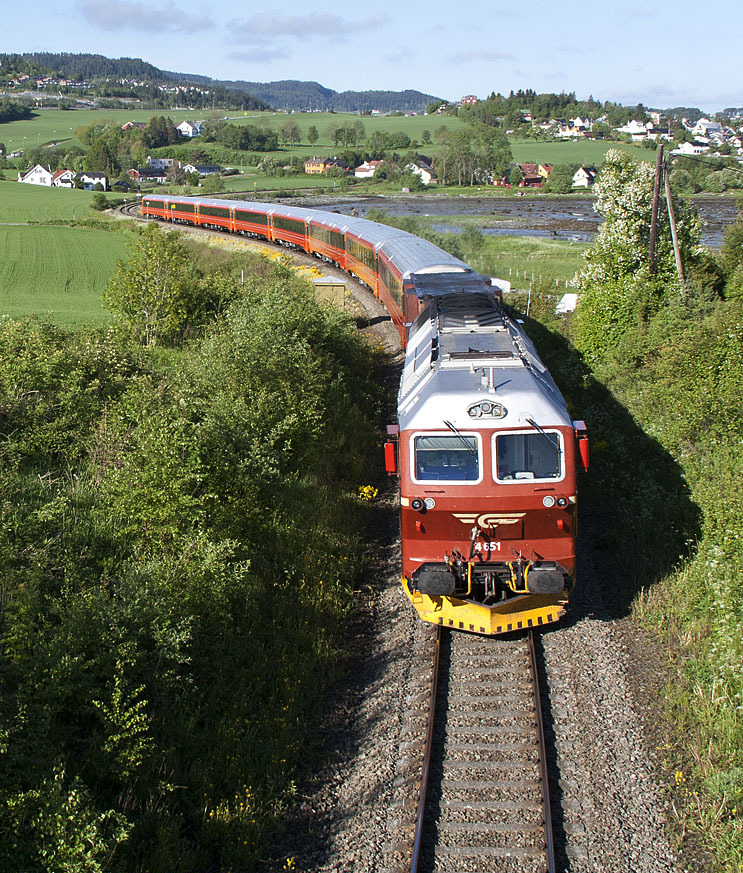
Di 4 train in Malvik Municipality

The locomotives are equipped with a V16 General Motors Electro-Motive Division 16-645E3B prime mover and an EMD AR7-D14B generator which offers a power output of 2,450 kilowatts (3,290 hp) at 900 revolutions per minute. The prime mover has a displacement of 10.570 litres (645.0 cu in) per cylinder, a stroke of 254 millimeters (10.0 in) and a diameter of 230.2 millimeters (9.06 in). This gives a starting tractive effort of 360 kilonewtons (81,000 lb_{f}). The locomotives have a Co′Co′ wheel arrangement, with six Norsk Elektrisk & Brown Boveri QD 335N4A traction motors.

The wheelbase is 1.850 meters (6 ft 0.8 in) between the outer and center wheels and 2.000 meters (6 ft 6.7 in) between the center and inner wheels. The outer axle distance is 15.600 meters (51 ft 2.2 in). The axle load is 19.1 tonnes (18.8 long tons; 21.1 short tons). The locomotives are 20.800 meters (68 ft 2.9 in) long and 4.350 meters (14 ft 3.3 in) tall. The wheel diameter is 1,100 millimeters (43 in) when new.
