= Bodø Station =

Railway station in Bodø, Norway

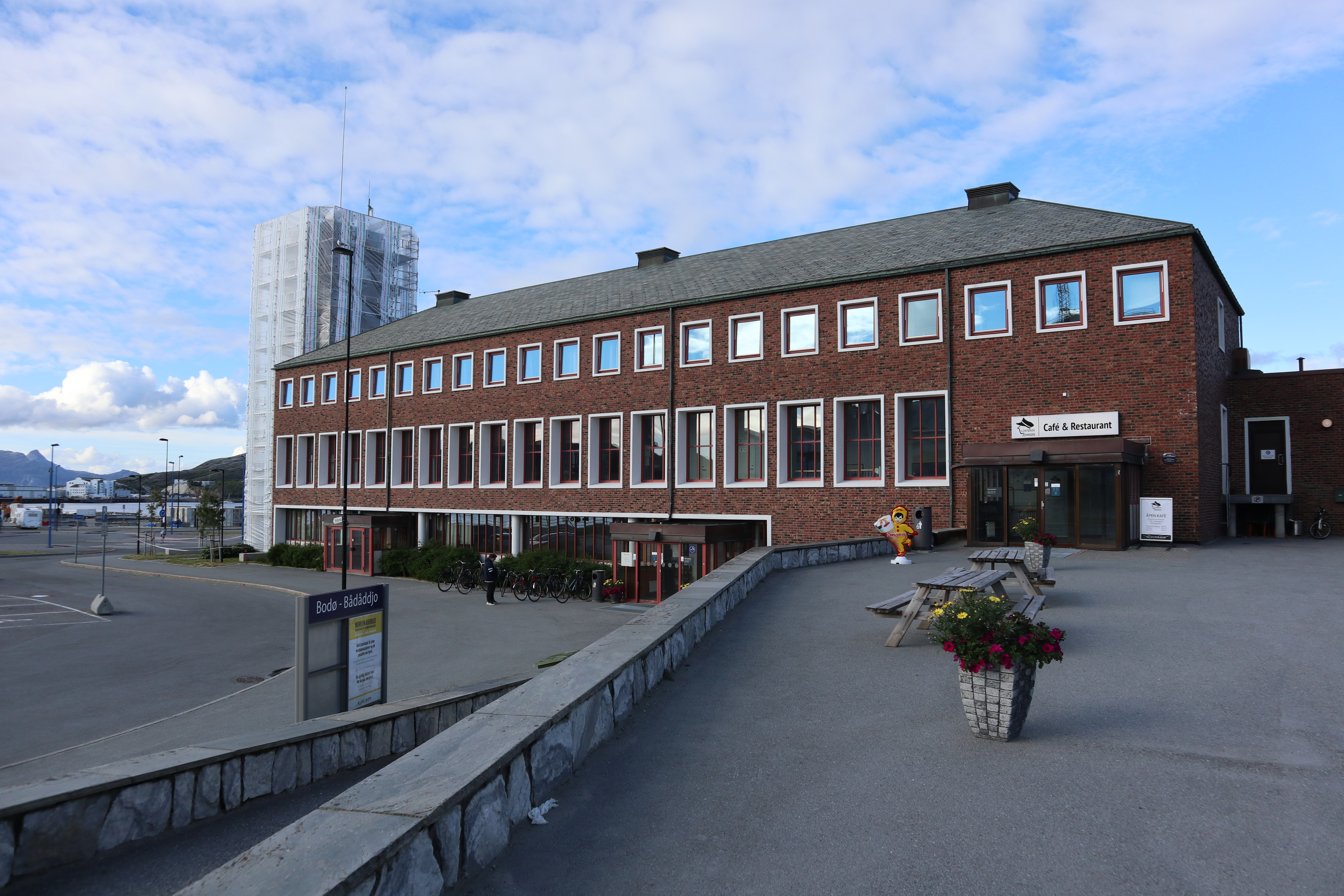
- View of the station in 2020

General information
- Location: Bodø, Bodø Municipality, Nordland county Norway
- Coordinates: 67°17′11″N 14°23′29″E
- Elevation: 2.9 m (9.5 ft)
- System: Railway station
- Owner: Bane NOR
- Operator: SJ Norge
- Line: Nordland Line
- Distance: 728.75 km (452.82 mi)
- Platforms: 2

Construction
- Architect: NSB Architecture Office

Other information
- Station code: BO
- IATA code: BOO

History
- Opened: 1961
Location
- Location within Nordland Location within Norway

Bodø Station (Norwegian: Bodø stasjon) is a railway station located in the center of the town of Bodø in Bodø Municipality in Nordland county, Norway. The station is the terminus of the Nordland Line that was completed in 1961. The station is served by day- and night trains to Trondheim and commuter trains to Rognan, operated by SJ Norge using Class 93 units.

The decision to build the railway to Bodø was made in 1923, but was not completed until the 1960s due to lack of funds and World War II. Freight traffic was permitted starting in December 1961 while the passenger section was opened on 7 June 1962 by King Olav V. In 2010, the station building was upgraded for 25 million kr, including a 23-room, 71-bed hostel.

Preceding station	Express trains	Following station
Fauske towards Trondheim S	F7	Terminus
Preceding station	Regional trains	Following station
Mørkved towards Rognan	R75	Terminus
