= Tyholt Tunnel =

Railway tunnel in Trondheim, Norway

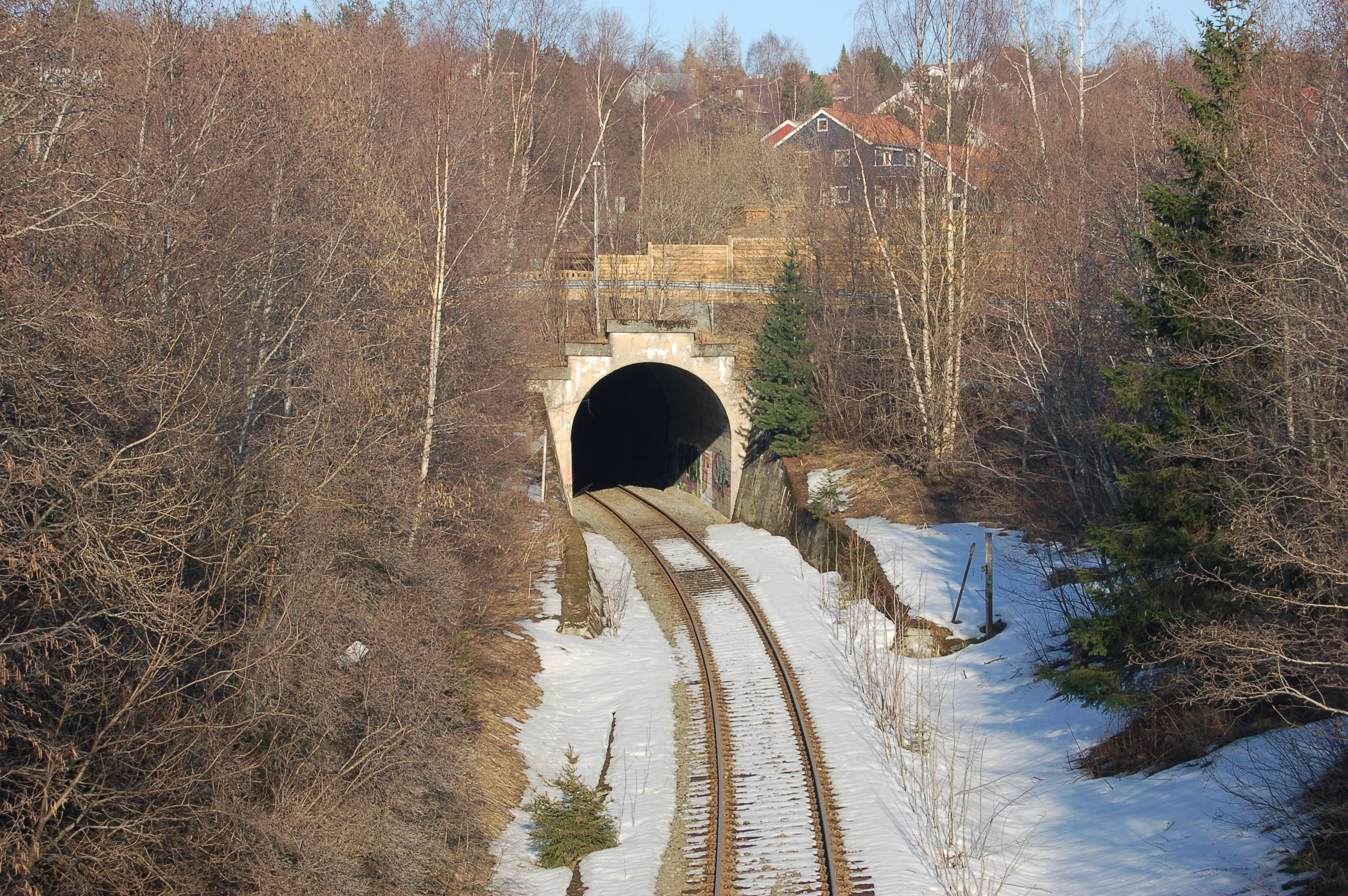
- The tunnel seen from Lerkendal
- Interactive map of Tyholt Tunnel

Overview
- Line: Stavne–Leangen Line
- Location: Trondheim, Norway
- Coordinates: 63°25′33″N 10°25′48″E
- System: Norwegian railway
- Start: Lerkendal
- End: Lademoen

Operation
- Opened: 1 June 1957
- Owner: Norwegian National Rail Administration
- Operator: CargoNet, Cargolink
- Character: Freight

Technical
- Line length: 2,785 m (9,137 ft)
- No. of tracks: Single
- Track gauge: 1,435 mm (4 ft 8 1/2 in)
- Electrified: No

The Tyholt Tunnel is a 2,785-meter (9,137 ft) railway tunnel which runs between Lerkendal and Lademoen on the Stavne–Leangen Line in Trondheim, Norway. The line takes its name for passing under the neighborhood of Tyholt and only sees regular freight traffic.

Construction began by the Wehrmacht during the German occupation of Norway from 1940 to 1945, but the project was never completed. The Norwegian State Railways (NSB) resumed the work in the 1950s. Part of the tunnel was built using cut-and-cover, part using a tunneling shield and most of it was blasted. It opened on 1 June 1957.

== Specifications ==
The Tyholt Tunnel is a 2,785-meter (9,137 ft) un-electrified, single track, standard gauge railway tunnel. It constitutes nearly half of the 5.8-kilometer (3.6 mi) Stavne–Leangen Line, which acts as a bypass around Trondheim. The tunnel is owned by the Norwegian National Rail Administration. From the south end, the first 70 meters (230 ft) is a culvert, the next 198 meters (650 ft) run through sediments and the final 2,517 meters (8,258 ft) are in bedrock.

== History ==
Map of the Stavne–Leangen Line, showing the Tyholt Tunnel and other railway lines in central Trondheim

During the German occupation of Norway as part of the Second World War, the Wehrmacht wanted a railway route past Trondheim which was guarded against sabotage. They decided that the best way to do this was to build a tunnel under the neighborhood of Tyholt. However, construction of the tunnel took much longer than expected, so instead the Wehrmacht started laying railway tracks in the streets in Trondheim. However, neither of the two lines were completed by the time of German capitulation on 8 May 1945.

The Norwegian State Railways regained interest in the line during the 1950s and resumed construction. The Tyholt Tunnel was among the first attempts in Norway to build a tunnel through sediments. The southernmost 70 meters (230 ft) were built using a cut-and-cover method. The next 198 meters (650 ft) were built through sediments using a tunneling shield. It measured 5 meters (16 ft) in length and had a diameter of 8 meters (26 ft). The shield was moved forward with twenty hydraulic pumps, moving it 75 centimeters (30 in) at a time. The tunnel received an outer precast concrete shell and an inner ring cast with formwork.

The main concern was the up to 1.0-meter (3 ft 3 in) thick layer of quick clay, which would stick to the shield. When the shield advanced, it would drag with it some of the clay, creating holes which had to be filled with concrete. After 90 meters (300 ft) an overpressure was required, and a 30 meters (98 ft) section of tunnel was sealed off. At first a pressure of 0.9 km/cm^{3} (90 Pa) was used, later increasing to 1.8 km/cm^{3} (180 Pa). The remainder of the tunnel was blasted.

The line and tunnel were officially opened on 1 June 1957 and revenue traffic started the following day. The tunnel was originally only used for freight trains, although it was occasionally used by passenger trains, especially when there was maintenance work on bridges. Ownership of the tunnel passed to the Norwegian National Rail Administration from 1 December 1996. NSB launched a now abandoned proposal in 2002 to establish an urban train service in Trondheim, which would have included passenger trains running in a loop through the tunnel. It would have required investments of 120 million Norwegian krone, including a connection for trains to be able to run from the east end of the line and westwards on the Nordland Line, and investments to noise insulate the Tyholt Tunnel.
