= Aalesund University College =

Institution of higher education in Norway

Coordinates: 62°28′19.87″N 6°14′8.58″E

- Høgskolen i Ålesund
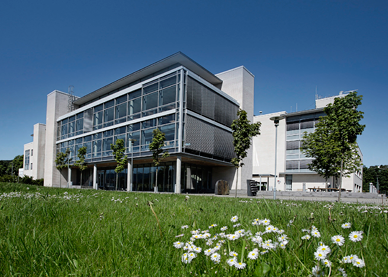
- Type: Public University
- Established: 1994
- Rector: Marianne Synnes
- Administrative staff: 224 (2014)
- Students: 2,249 (2014)
- Location: Ålesund, Norway
- Website: Official web site

Aalesund University College (Norwegian: Høgskolen i Ålesund) was a medium-sized institution of higher education in Norway with 2249 students and 224 employees.

AAUC was founded in 1994 as a result of the reorganisation of professional higher education in Norway. Three former colleges in Ålesund, the College of Marine Studies, the College of Engineering and Aalesund College of Nursing were then merged into one institution.

The college was divided into five faculties:

- Faculty of Health Sciences
- Faculty of International Marketing
- Faculty of Life Sciences
- Faculty of Engineering and Natural Sciences
- Faculty of Maritime Technology and Operations

AAUC was merged with NTNU, Sør-Trøndelag University College and Gjøvik University College under the name NTNU in Aalesund in January 2016.
