= Stavne–Leangen line =

Railway line in Norway

Stavne–Leangen Line
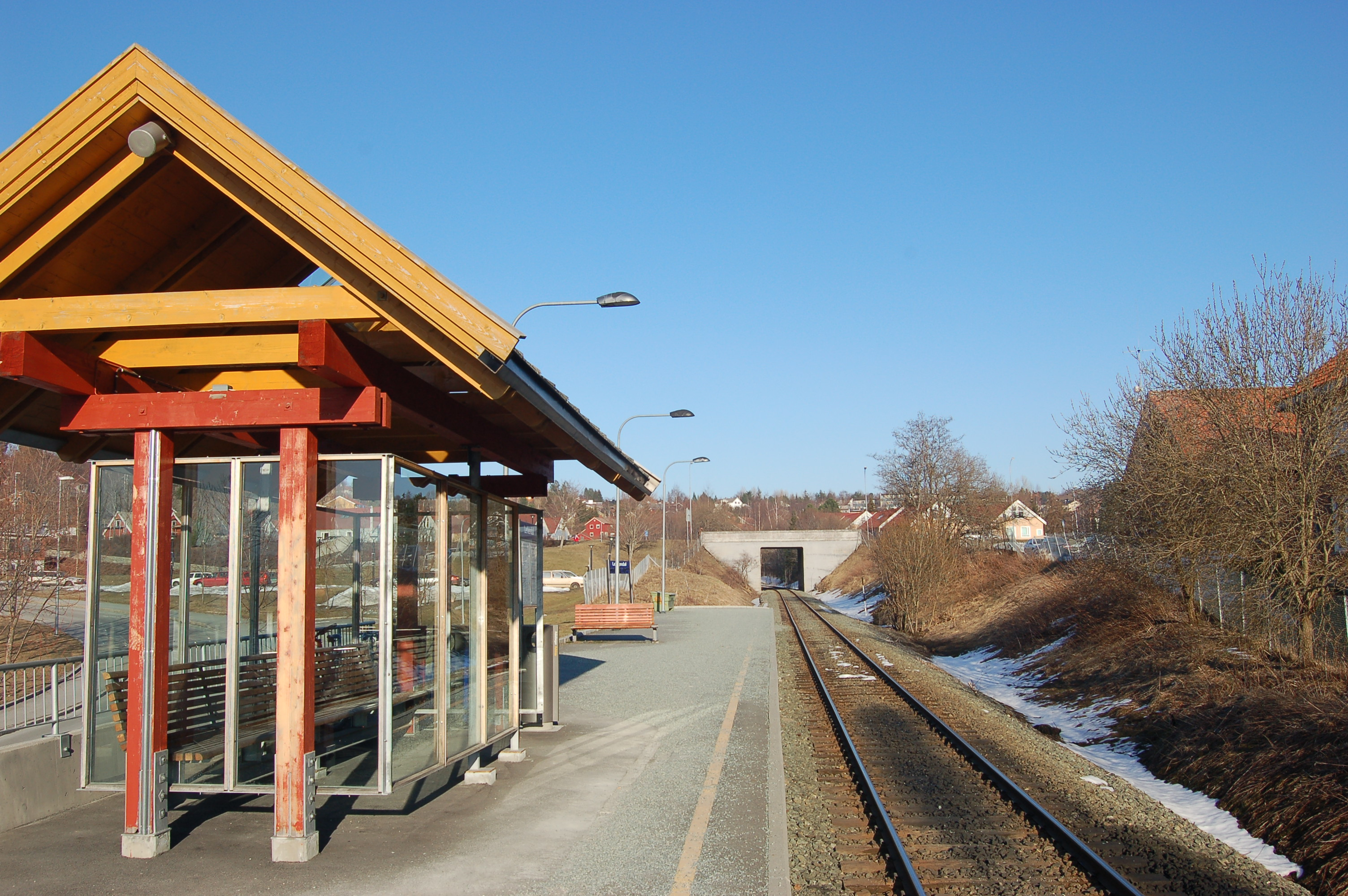
- Lerkendal Station

Overview
- Owner: Bane NOR
- Termini: Marienborg Station; Leangen Station
- Stations: 1
- Website: Jernbanedirektoratet (in Norwegian Bokmål)

Service
- Type: Railway
- System: Rail transport in Norway
- Operator(s): SJ Norge
- Rolling stock: Class 92

History
- Opened: 2 June 1957

Technical
- Line length: 5.8 km (3.6 mi)
- Number of tracks: Single
- Character: Commuter trains
- Track gauge: 1,435 mm (4 ft 8 1/2 in) standard gauge
- Electrification: Yes
- Operating speed: 100 km/h (62 mph)

The Stavne–Leangen Line (Norwegian: Stavne–Leangenbanen) is a 5.8-kilometer (3.6 mi) railway line between Stavne and Leangen in Trondheim, Norway. The line provides an alternative connection between the Dovre Line and Nordland Line, allowing trains to bypass Trondheim Central Station. The line includes the Stavne Bridge over the river of Nidelva, Lerkendal Station and the 2.7-kilometer (1.7 mi) long Tyholt Tunnel. Construction of the line started during the Second World War by the Wehrmacht, the German military occupying Norway, in an attempt to make the railway in Trondheim resistant to sabotage. Because of the long construction time of the tunnel, tracks were laid in the city streets, but neither route was completed before the end of the war. Construction was placed on hold and the Stavne–Leangen Line did not open until 2 June 1957. At first it was primarily used by freight trains.

Since 1988, passenger services from the Dovre Line to Lerkendal Station have been provided, but they do not use the Tyholt Tunnel, instead taking a U-turn back across the Nidelva onto the Dovre Line. After having been electrified in the mid-2020's, the line was put in use as a backup for passenger trains for if the equivalent sections of the Dovre Line were closed. However, no regularly scheduled passenger services are known to have occurred on the line.

== Route ==
Map of the line and other railway lines in central Trondheim

The Stavne–Leangen Line is 5.8 kilometers (3.6 mi) and acts as a connection between the Dovre Line and the Nordland Line (formerly the Meråker Line) in Trondheim. It is single track and standard gauge, is not electrified and has no passing loops. It is equipped with centralized traffic control (CTC), has eight bridges, two tunnels and no level crossings. The line is owned by the Norwegian National Rail Administration.

To the southwest, the line connects to the Dovre Line at Stavne. There are two forks, laid triangularly, one each from the north and south. On the Dovre Line's side of the triangle is the closed Stavne Station. The track from the north branches off just after passing Marienborg Station. The station is built in such a way that trains on the Dovre Line use the one track and trains on the Stavne–Leangen Line use the other track. The Stavne–Leangen Line's northern switch is located 547.82 kilometers (340.40 mi) from Oslo Central Station, and 2.82 kilometers (1.75 mi) from Trondheim Central Station. The southern fork merges with the northern fork 1.79 kilometers (1.11 mi) after the northern fork branches from the mainline.

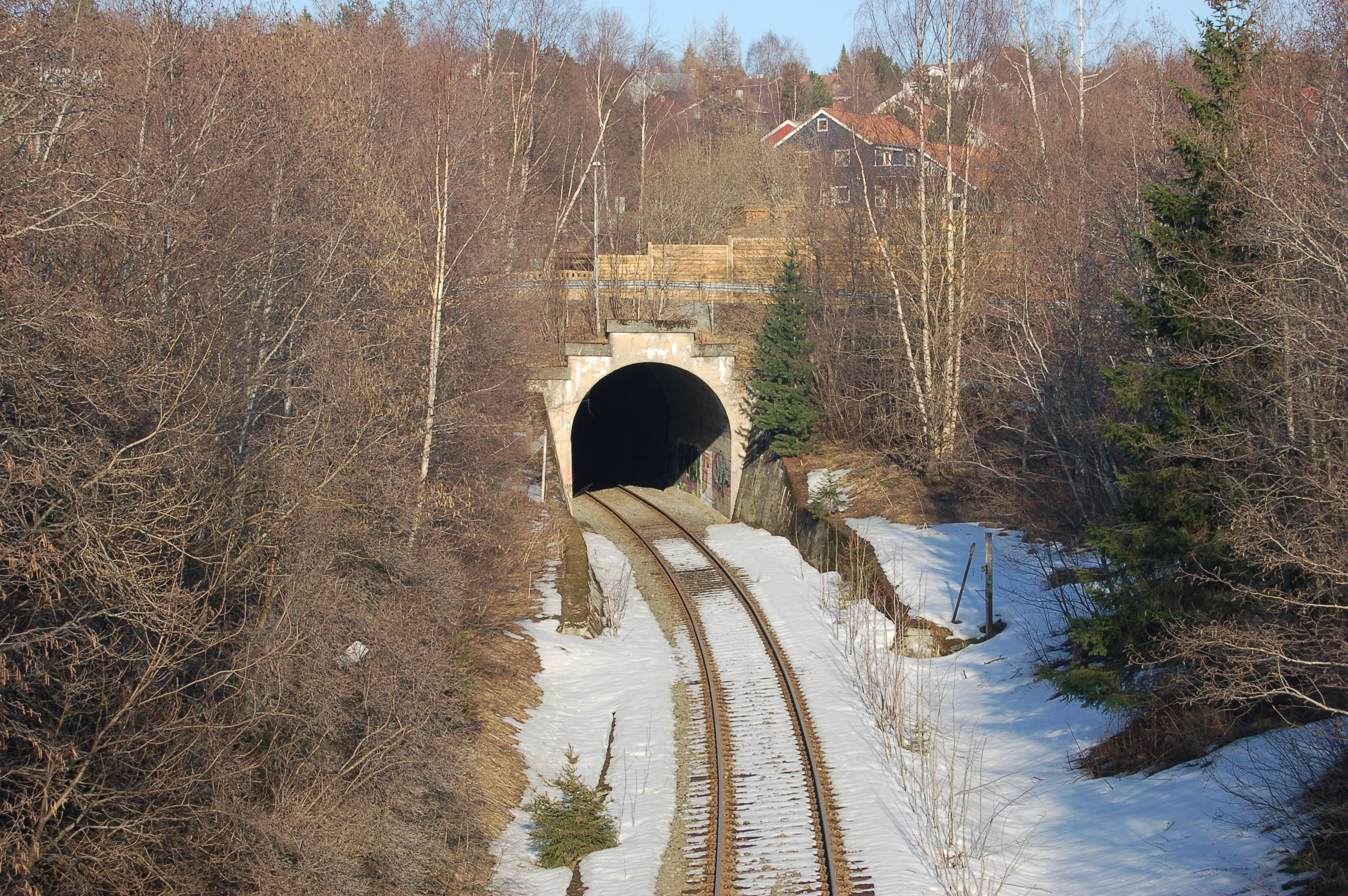
Western entrance of the Tyholt Tunnel

At 80 meters (260 ft) after the merger, the line crosses Nidelva on the 186-meter (610 ft) long Stavne Bridge before crossing European Road E6 on a 25.3-meter (83 ft) long concrete bridge. The line then reaches Lerkendal Station, which is located 2.55 kilometers (1.58 mi) from Marienborg. It serves the Gløshaugen campus of the Norwegian University of Science and Technology, and Lerkendal Stadion, the home ground of Rosenborg BK. The line continues through the 2,785-meter (9,137 ft) long Tyholt Tunnel, which starts 270 meters (890 ft) after Lerkendal Station. The line merges with the Nordland Line at Leangen Station, which is located 3.49 kilometers (2.17 mi) from Trondheim Central Station.

== History ==
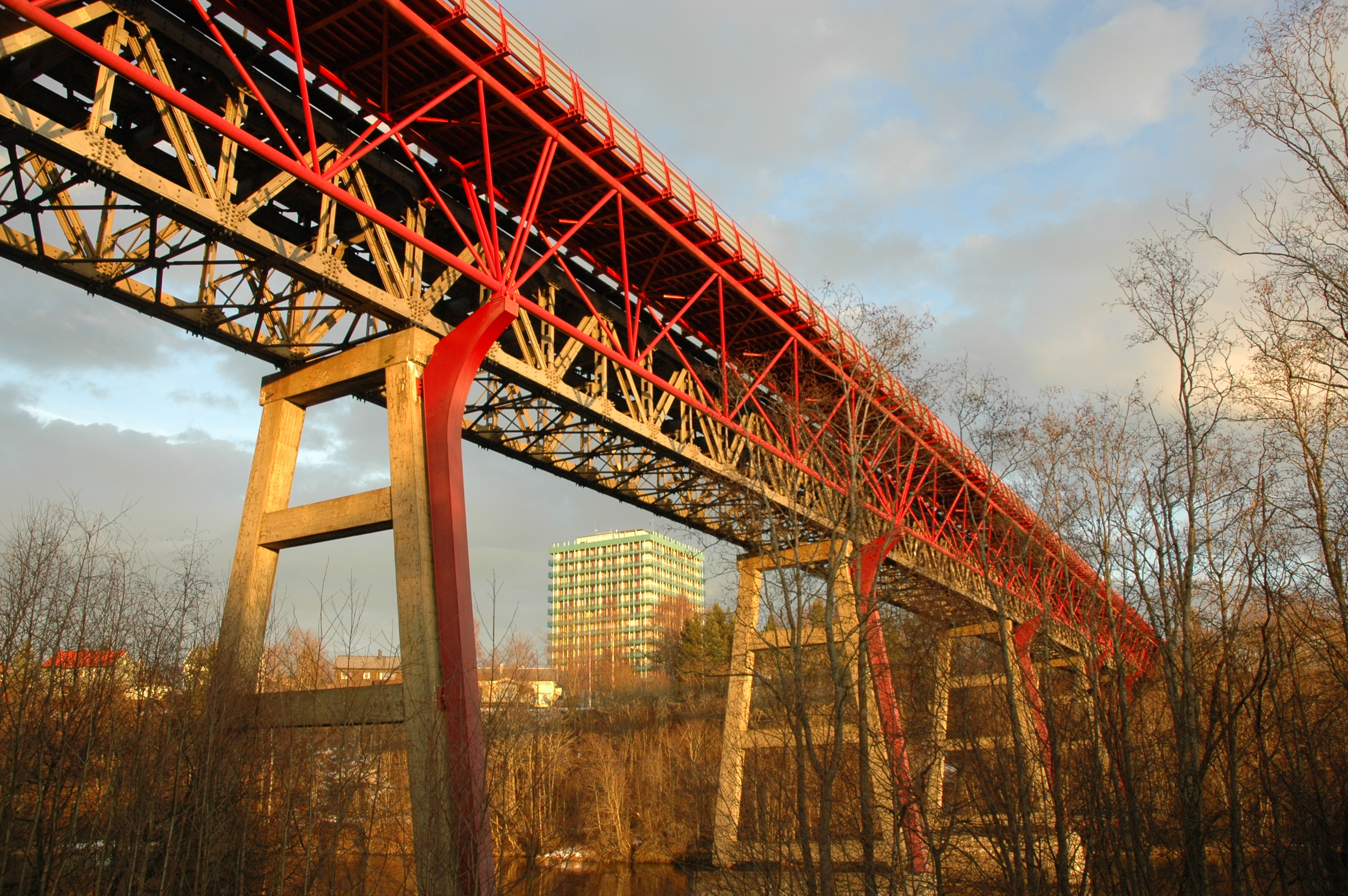
Stavne Bridge

During the German occupation of Norway as part of the Second World War, the Wehrmacht wanted a railway route past Trondheim which was guarded against sabotage. They decided that the best way to do this was to build a tunnel under the neighborhood of Tyholt. However, construction of the tunnel took much longer than expected, so instead Wehrmacht started laying railway tracks in the streets in Trondheim. They planned that the railway would branch from the Dovre Line at Skansen Station and then follow Sandgata and Olav Tryggvasons gate, cross Nidelva on Bakke Bridge and then run up Innherredsveien before reaching the Meråker Line at Lademoen Station. However, by German capitulation on 8 May 1945, construction of the railway had only reached Søndre gate.

The Norwegian State Railways regained interest in the line during the 1950s and resumed construction. The line was officially opened on 1 June 1957 and revenue traffic started the following day. The line was originally only used for freight trains, although it was occasionally used by passenger trains, especially when there was maintenance work on bridges. The line received CTC on 11 January 1976. Lerkendal Station was opened on 1 December 1988, and with the establishment of the Trøndelag Commuter Rail in 1993, the station started being used for scheduled commuter rail services. Ownership of the line passed to the Norwegian National Rail Administration from 1 December 1996. Marienborg Station opened in 1999, and from 2001, all commuter trains operating to and from Steinkjer had Lerkendal Station as their southern terminus, which is no longer the case as their terminus is now in Lundamo (Støren from 2022 onwards).

In 2002, NSB launched a now abandoned proposal to establish an urban train service in Trondheim. According to the proposal, trains would have operated along the Dovre Line from Melhus Station and then run to Lerkendal before continuing onwards to Lademoen and running in a loop back to the central station. The services was proposed to be operated as part of the commuter rail system. It would have required investments of 120 million Norwegian krone, including a connection for trains to be able to run from the east end of the line and westwards on the Nordland Line, and investments to noise insulate the Tyholt Tunnel. In a 2005 report, SINTEF recommended that if such a service should be introduced, it should have four services per hour and operated with light rail rolling stock as a circle line with a tail southwards to Heimdal or Melhus. The report further commented that the new connection at Lademoen would have a 3.6-percent gradient, which would be too steep for mainline trains.
