= 1991 Rotvoll protests =

1991 protest in Norway

The Rotvoll controversy refers to a political protest in Norway in 1991 against the construction of a research and development (R&D) facility for Statoil at Rotvoll.

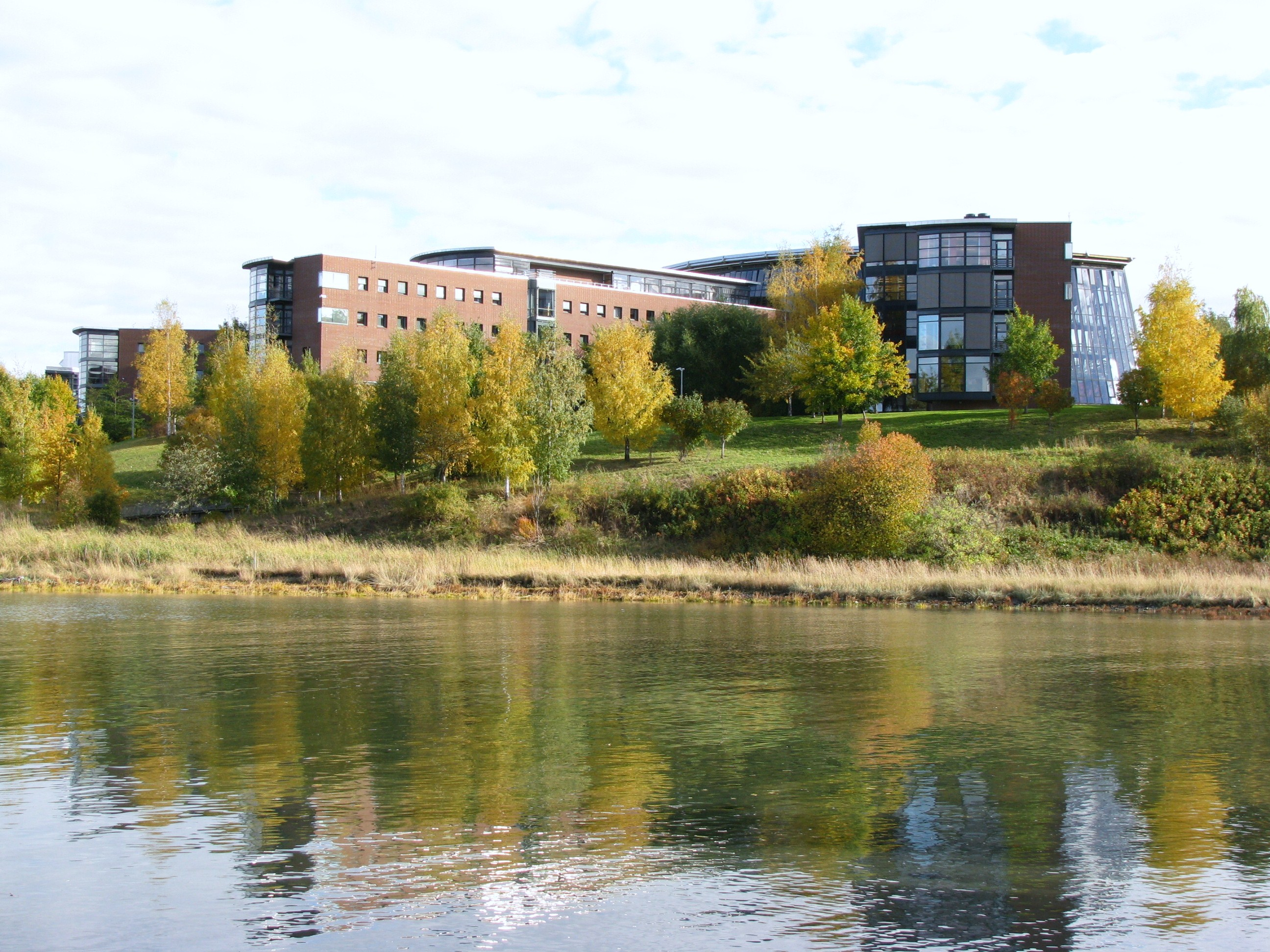
Statoil centre at Rotvoll, Trondheim

== Key events ==
Statoil wanted to establish a new R&D centre in Trondheim and in 1985 had acquired land at the recreational area Rotvoll east of Trondheim. The environmental organization Norges Naturvernforbund called the land an "area of national importance" and claimed that Statoil had not been sufficiently open with the public about its purchase. Naturvenforbund also argued that other suitable options existed in the Trondheim area. Protesters argued that the area, as a "manor landscape," was part of the city's cultural heritage and an important bird nesting site. Statoil defended the choice of site for the R&D center, saying it had been thoroughly considered and was the most environmentally friendly solution of the options available.

The controversy became national on 30 June when the Norwegian Broadcasting Corporation made a large story on the national news, followed up by a number of national newspapers. The main content of the news was a tent camp that had been established at Rotvoll, by activists to protest against the construction. The tent camp consisted among others of members of Natur og Ungdom and the Norwegian Society for the Conservation of Nature. Each weekend there was a family day at Rotvoll, including appearances of singer Hans Rotmo. Statoil CEO Harald Norvik met with the protesters, but came to no agreement. Statoil also published multiple full-page advertisements in the Trondheim newspapers Arbeider-Avisa and Adresseavisen.

On August August 6, 1991, the Norwegian government granted Statoil's building permit. Several opposition parties, including the Socialist Left and the Liberal Party, urged Statoil to reconsider its choice of building site.

After school started in August there were few activists left at the camp, and in early October Statoil sent a letter to them informing them that they would start construction soon. At 7:00 on the morning of 10 October 1991, following a formal complaint by Statoil to the police, the camp was cleared by local police. Around 13 people were arrested and released without charge. Statoil began moving in construction equipment immediately. However, at 11:00, around 50 further protesters broke through the newly erected barriers and attempted to occupy the construction site. They were also arrested and fined ca. kr 3,000 each (US$462.75 today). The following day a legal demonstration was held by 500 people outside the construction area.

On October 11, a further 30 protesters entered the site and stopped work for 7 hours. They were arrested and fined; the police increased the fine to kr 4000 (US$617 today). The same day, Greenpeace sent a letter to the Norwegian Parliament urging it to force Statoil to reconsider. Greenpeace saw the issue in connection with its opposition to the construction of a third natural gas pipeline from the Ekofisk oil field to Germany.

The R&D center was completed in 1993.

== Legacy ==
The controversy was quite prominent in Trondheim, and though Statoil Rotvoll was built, it resulted in other environmental victories later:

- A few years later a green area at Fagerheim in Trondheim was not demolished, partially to avoid a new Rotvoll incident.
- Area planning in Trondheim has since shifted, and instead of building large work places outside the town, they are being moved into town. Examples of this include Fokus Bank, the city administration, the county administration and Adresseavisen (announced) in addition to the planned centralising of the Norwegian University of Science and Technology and Sør-Trøndelag University College, totaling many thousands of jobs.
- Environmental groups threatened with new demonstrations and actions when Statoil announced plans for expansions of Statoil Rotvoll in 2004.
