= Lilleby Station =

Railway station in Trondheim, Norway

Lilleby
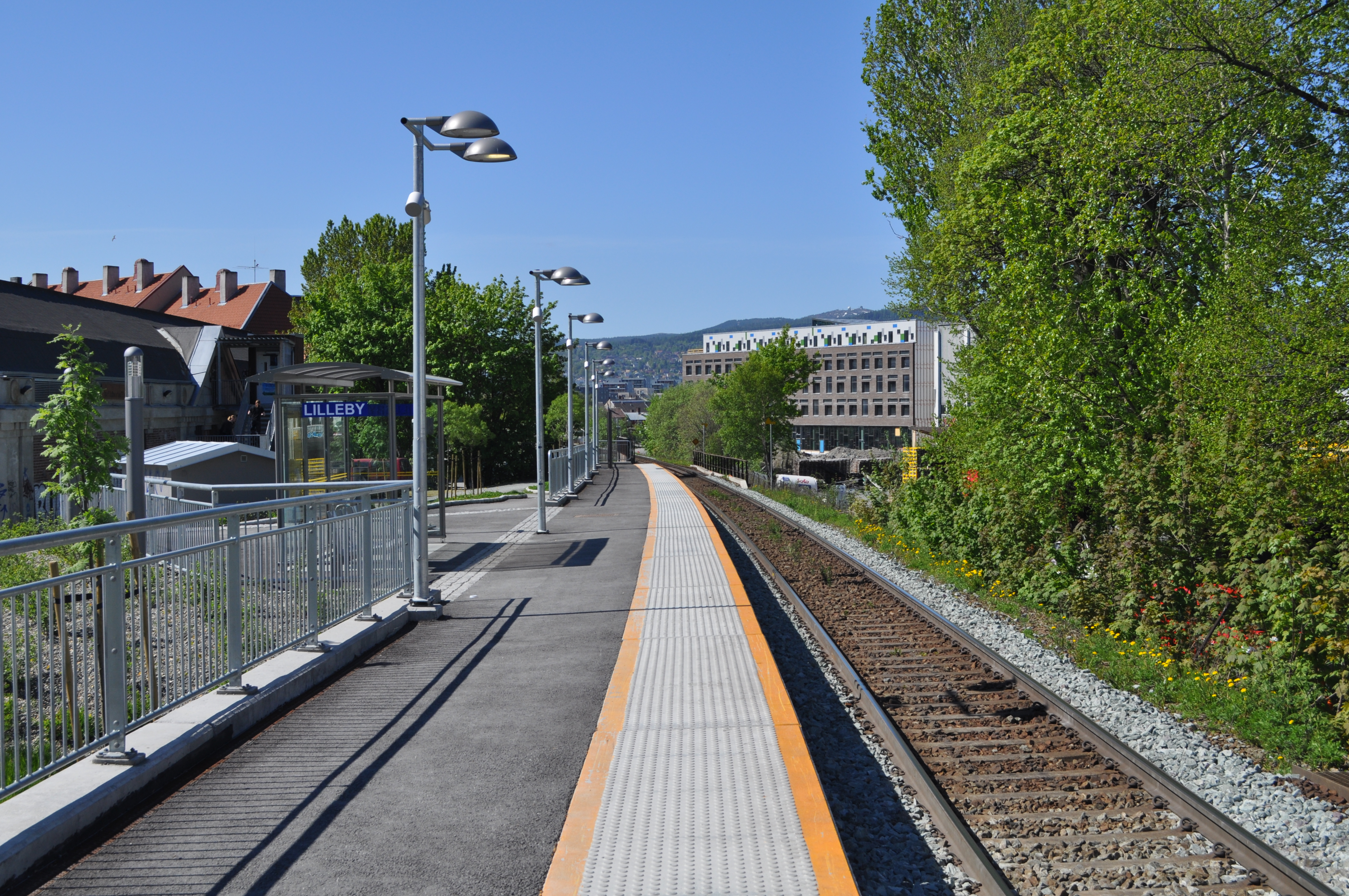

General information
- Location: Lademoen, Trondheim; Norway
- Coordinates: 63°26′14″N 10°25′13″E
- Owner: Bane NOR
- Operator: SJ Norge
- Line: Nordland Line
- Distance: 1.77 km (1.10 mi)
- Platforms: 1

History
- Opened: 1967
Location

Lilleby is a railway station on the Nordland Line located in Trondheim, Norway serving the area of Lademoen. The station is serviced by the Trøndelag Commuter Rail operated by SJ Norge. In 2006 the station changed its name from Lademoen so the Lademoen name could be used for the new station Lademoen located at Nedre Elvehavn. Lilleby was opened in 1967 and is 1.77 km from Trondheim Central Station. Lademoen is primarily a residential area.

Preceding station		Following station
Lademoen	Nordland Line	Leangen; Ladalen
Preceding station	Local trains	Following station
Lademoen	Trøndelag Commuter Rail	Leangen
