= Leangen Station =

Railway station in Trondheim, Norway

Leangen

General information
- Location: Leangen, Trondheim; Norway
- Coordinates: 63°26′12″N 10°27′51″E
- Elevation: 33.6 m (110 ft)
- Owner: Bane NOR
- Operator: SJ Norge
- Line: Nordland Line
- Distance: 3.49 km
- Platforms: 2

History
- Opened: 1882
- Rebuilt: 2019
Location

Leangen is a railway station on the Nordland Line located in Trondheim, Norway, serving the area of Leangen. The station is served by the local trains Trøndelag Commuter Rail operated by SJ Norge. The station dates back to the construction of the Meråker Line (as the line was called then), and opened in 1882. Leangen serves a mostly industrial area, but there is also some housing, a shopping mall and Queen Maud's College of Early Childhood Education and the faculty of nursing at Sør-Trøndelag University College.

The station was renewed and re-opened on 28. august 2019.

| Preceding station | | Following station |
|---|---|---|
| Lilleby; Ladalen | Nordland Line | Rotvoll |
| Lerkendal | Stavne–Leangen Line | — |
| Preceding station | Local trains | Following station |
| Lilleby | Trøndelag Commuter Rail | Rotvoll |
