= Verftsbrua =

Bridge in Norway

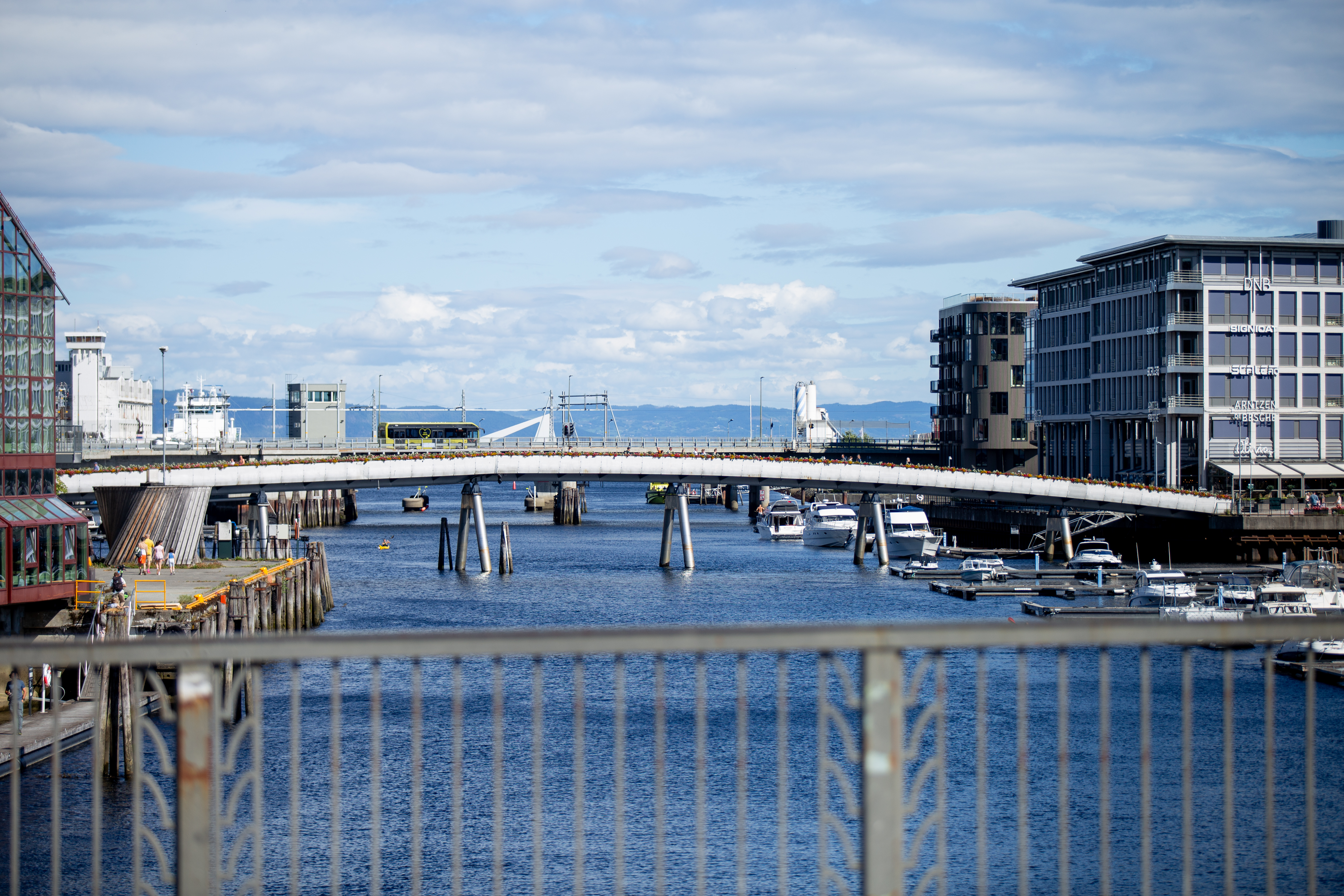
- Verftsbrua shot from Bakke bru
- Coordinates: 63°26′N 10°25′E
- Crosses: Nidelva
- Locale: Trondheim

Characteristics
- Material: Steel
- Total length: 125 meter
- Width: 4.5 meter
- Height: 6 meter

History
- Opened: 2003

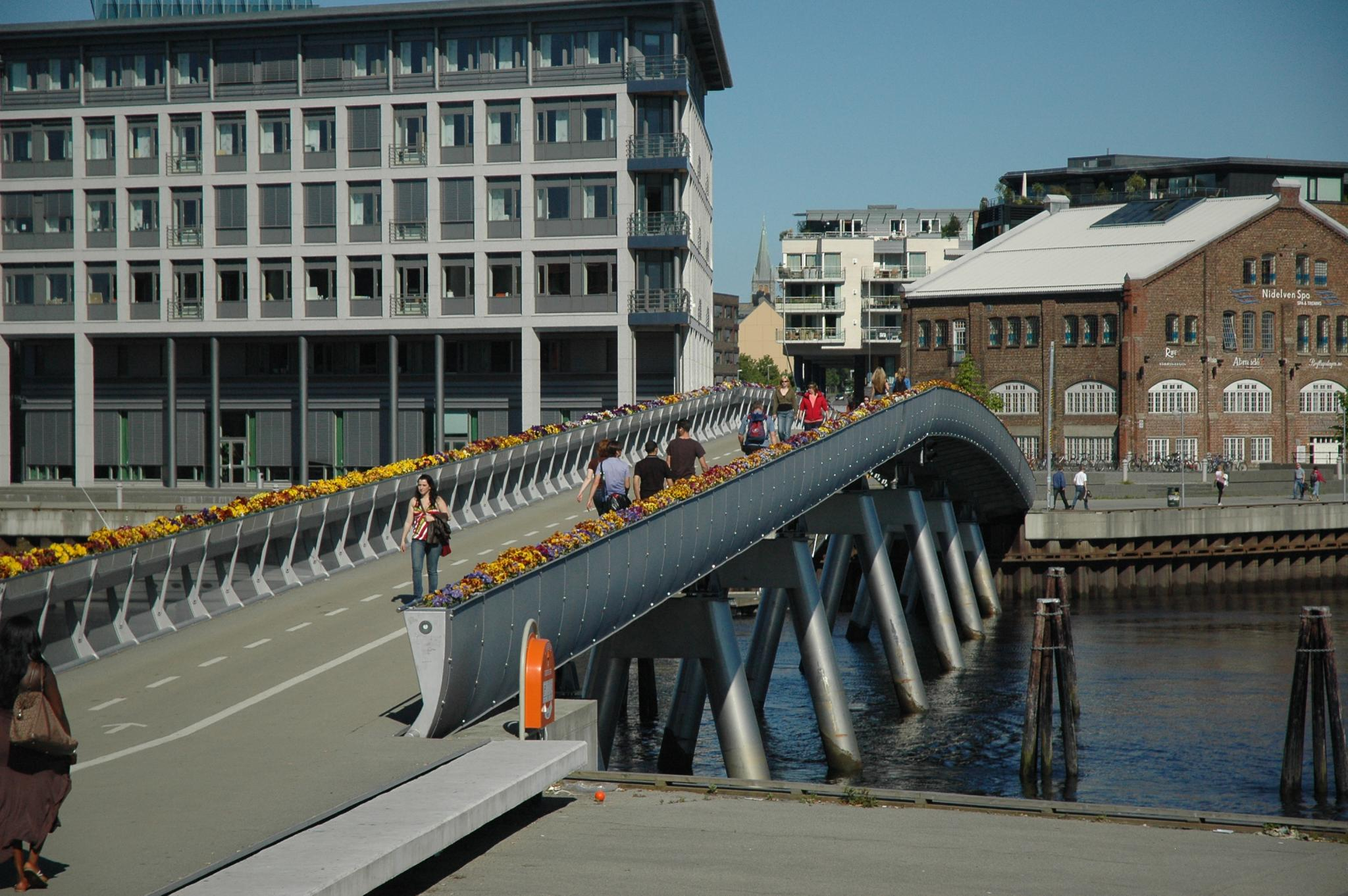

Verftsbrua (Norwegian for "Yard Bridge"), also popularly called Blomsterbrua ("Flower Bridge"), is a bridge at the bay of Trondheim. The bridge, built in 2003, spans 125 metres (410 ft). The name Verftsbrua comes from the nearby shipyard, Trondhjems mekaniske Værksted, while the name Blomsterbrua is due to the bridge featuring flowerbeds along its edges.

It is mainly used for walking and biking, with over 5,000 people using it every day. It was built so people could reach the centre of the city without taking a long detour. Boats up to a height of 6 metres (20 ft) can pass the bridge, with a channel width of 12.5 metres (41 ft). The bridge is retractable, and can be opened to allow taller boats to pass.
