= Ladalen Station =

Former railway station in Trondheim, Norway

Ladalen
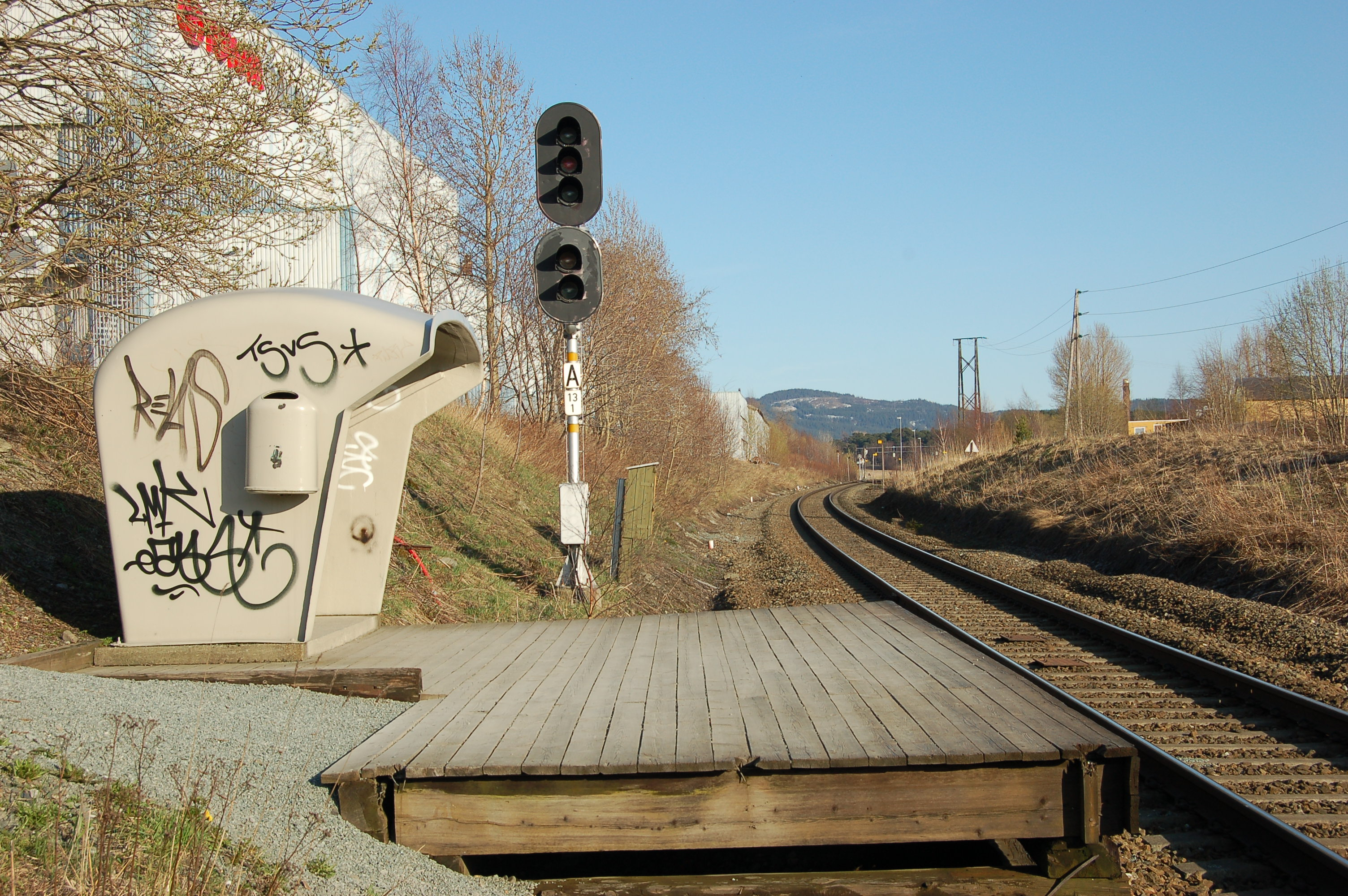

General information
- Location: Lade, Trondheim; Norway
- Coordinates: 63°26′22″N 10°27′15″E
- Owner: Norwegian National Rail Administration
- Line: Nordland Line
- Distance: 2.91 km (1.81 mi)
- Platforms: One island
- Tracks: Single

History
- Opened: 29 May 1989
- Closed: 15 June 2008
Location

Ladalen Station (Norwegian: Ladalen holdeplass) is a disused railway station on the Nordland Line located in Trondheim, Norway serving the area of Lade. The station was serviced by the local trains Trøndelag Commuter Rail operated by the Norwegian State Railways (NSB). The station opened in 1989, and was closed on 15 June 2008, when a bridge at Leangen Station allowed access to the north side of the tracks. It served what is primarily an industrial area. The station was located west of Lilleby and east of Leangen.

Preceding station		Following station
Lilleby	Nordland Line	Leangen
