= Trondheim Business School =

Coordinates: 63°24′50″N 10°26′1″E

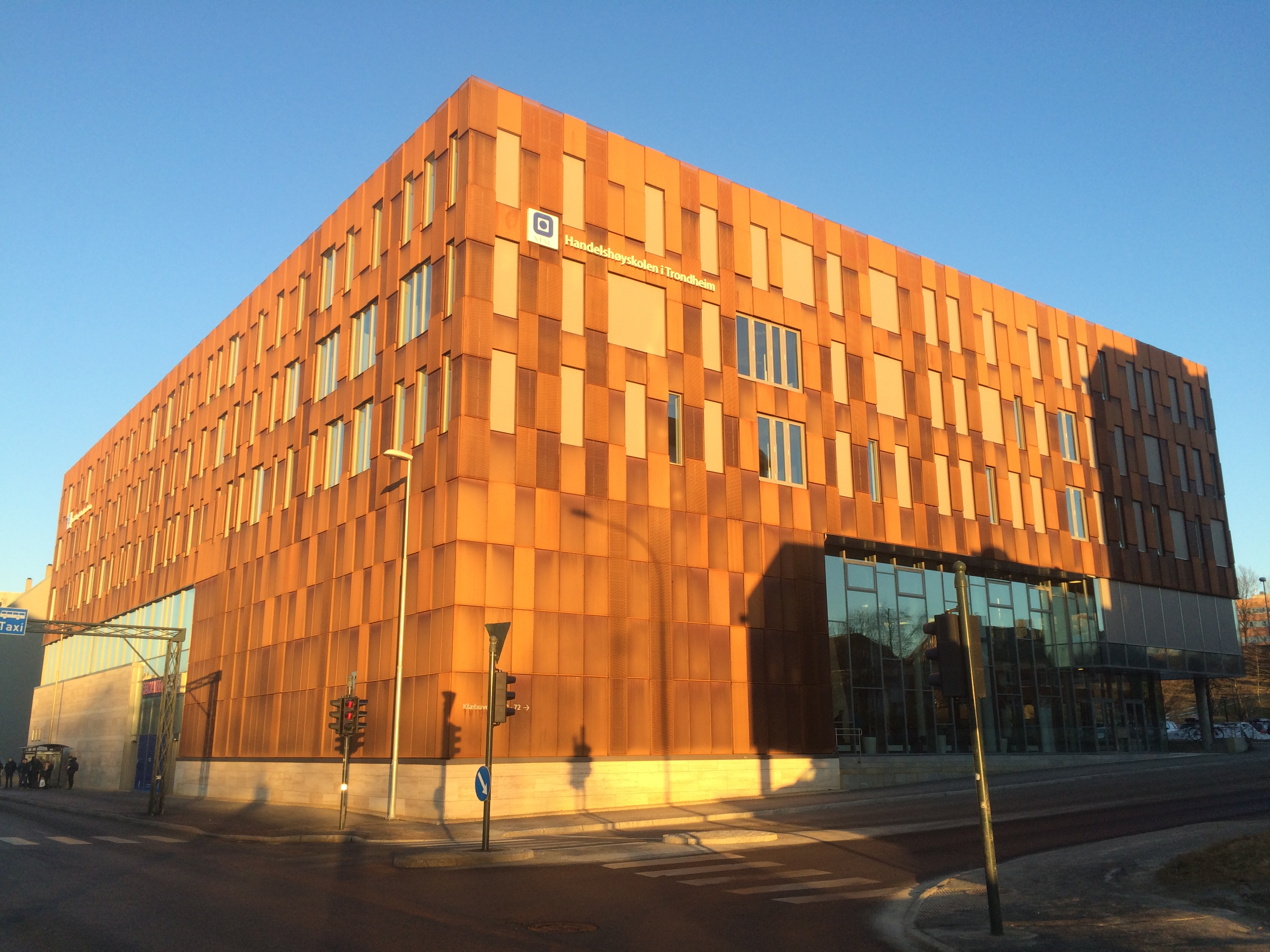
The school building seen from South West. Architect: Rambøll

Trondheim Business School (Norwegian: Handelshøyskolen i Trondheim) or HHiT, former a faculty of Sør-Trøndelag University College (HiST) in Trondheim, Norway, is, as of 2016, a faculty of Norwegian University of Science and Technology. The school provides economics and business management education. It was founded in 1967 as an independent university college, but in 1994 it and seven other university colleges in Trondheim merged to form HiST. From the merger until 2003 the school was called Sør-Trøndelag University College, Faculty of Economics and Administration.

The school is located at Elgeseter, in a building that was officially opened in 2014.

The school has about 1200 students, including 150 postgraduate and a few doctoral students. The school only offers one bachelor degree, in business administration, but with possibilities to specialise in finance, accounting, marketing, management, sport management and audition. There is also possibility to get a Master of Science in Business Administration with specialisation in finance, management or marketing.
