= Lademoen Station =

Railway station in Trondheim, Norway

Coordinates: 63°26′15.40″N 10°24′57.04″E

Lademoen/Nedre Elvehavn
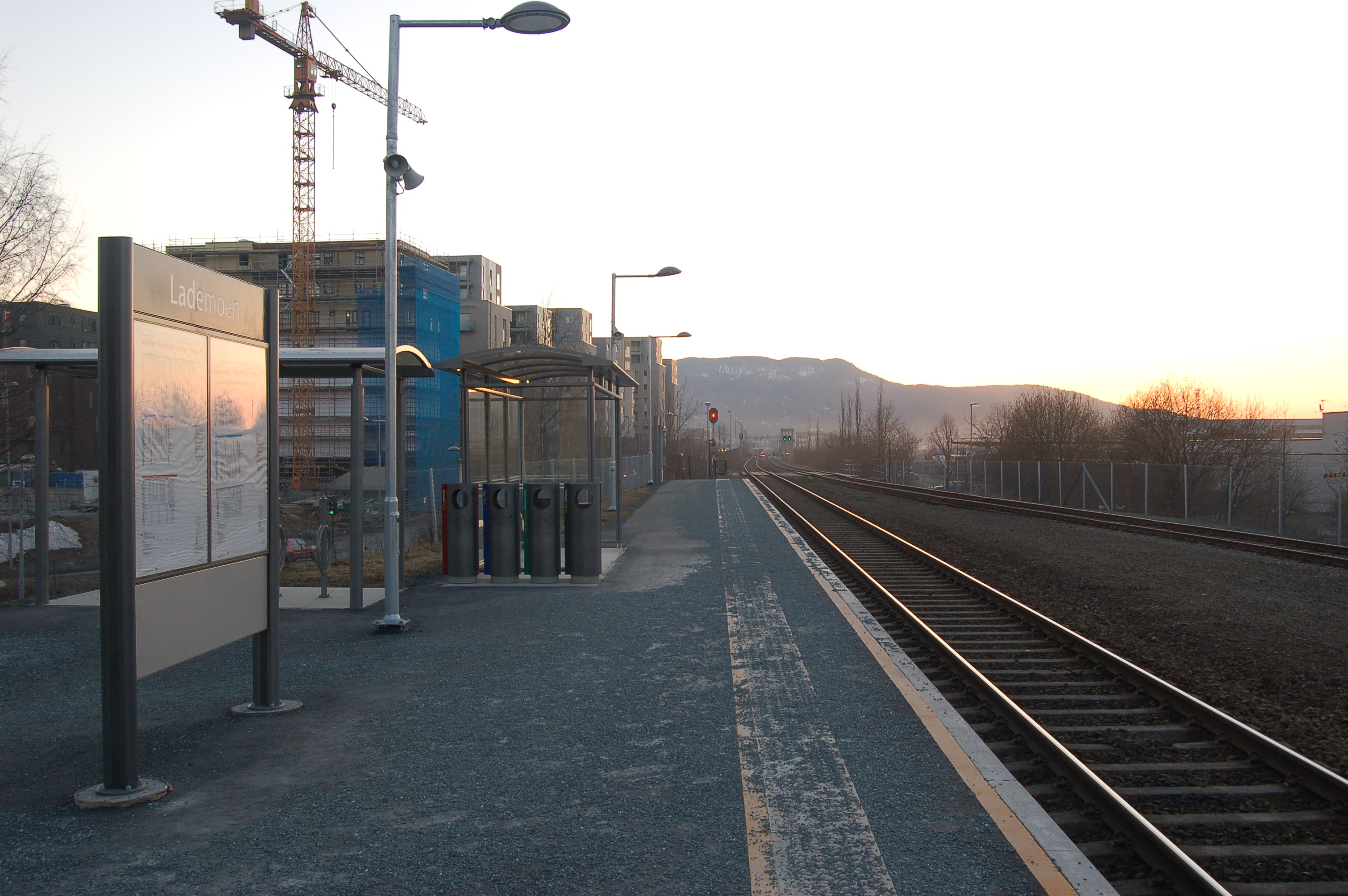

General information
- Location: Nedre Elvehavn, Trondheim; Norway
- Elevation: 6 m (20 ft)
- Owner: Bane NOR
- Operator: SJ Norge
- Line: Nordland Line
- Distance: 0.94 km (0.58 mi)
- Platforms: 1
- Connections: Bus: AtB

History
- Opened: 7 January 2007
Location

Lademoen or Lademoen/Nedre Elvehavn is a railway station on the Nordland Line at Nedre Elvehavn in Trondheim, Norway. The station was opened on 7 January 2007 and is served by the local trains Trøndelag Commuter Rail by SJ Norge. It is located 0.94 km from Trondheim Central Station and at 6 meters above sea level.

The station serves the areas of Nedre Elvehavn and Nyhavna. This includes dense residential areas and large workplaces including DnB NOR, PricewaterhouseCoopers, Deloitte and Teekay Petrojarl in addition to Solsiden shopping mall and the Trondheim Academy of Fine Art, part of the Norwegian University of Science and Technology.

== Naming conflict ==
After Trondheims Mekaniske Verksted was closed, an urban renewal program was initiated on the site at Nedre Elvehavn, with the first steps being finished in 2003. Before 1967 the station was the site of the old station named Lademoen, but this station was moved to the present location of Lilleby Station in 1967. The station kept the name Lademoen.

When a new station was to be opened at Nedre Elvehavn, local politicians wanted to use a traditional name for the station and chose to call the new station Lademoen and change the existing station's name to Lilleby. This was despite that the name Nedre Elvehavn has been used for centuries in Trondheim. Also, this has resulted in the station Lademoen being located at Nedre Elvehavn and the station Lilleby being located at Lademoen, and not at Lilleby. NSB has chosen to use the term Lademoen/Nedre Elvehavn in its routes.

Preceding station		Following station
Trondheim S	Nordland Line	Lilleby
Preceding station	Local trains	Following station
Trondheim S	Trøndelag Commuter Rail	Lilleby
