= Lademoen Church =

Church in Trøndelag, Norway

- Lademoen kirke
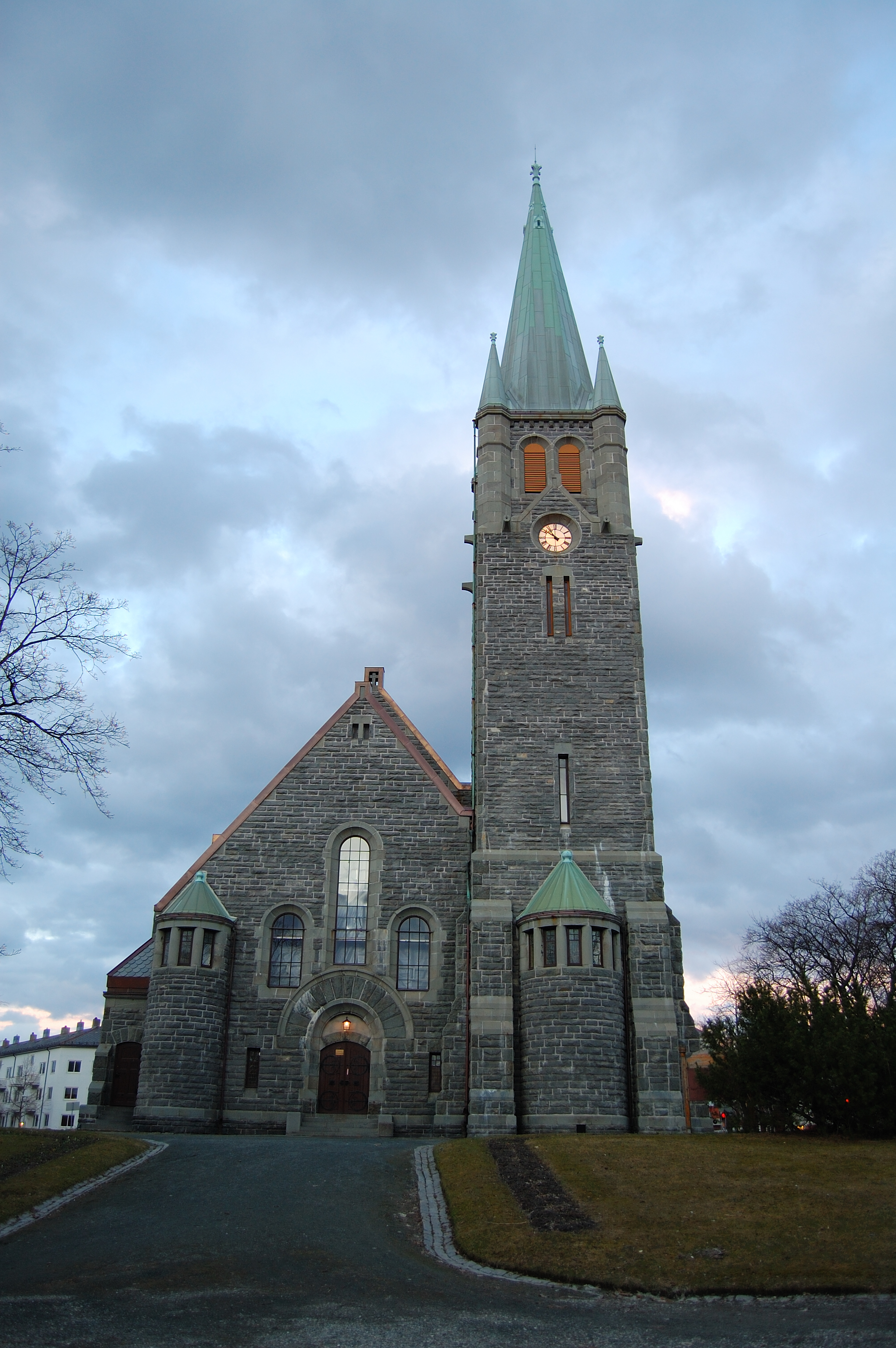
- View of the church
- Lademoen Church
- 63.437077539°N 10.4303276538°E
- Location: Trondheim Municipality, Trøndelag
- Country: Norway
- Denomination: Church of Norway
- Churchmanship: Evangelical Lutheran

History
- Status: Parish church
- Founded: 1905
- Consecrated: 15 Nov 1905

Architecture
- Functional status: Active
- Architect: Ole Stein
- Architectural type: Cruciform
- Style: Art Nouveau
- Completed: 1905 (121 years ago)

Specifications
- Capacity: 500
- Materials: Stone and brick

Administration
- Diocese: Nidaros bispedømme
- Deanery: Nidaros domprosti
- Parish: Bakklandet og Lademoen
- Norwegian Cultural Heritage Site
- Type: Church
- Status: Listed
- ID: 84882

Lademoen Church (Norwegian: Lademoen kirke) is a parish church of the Church of Norway in Trondheim Municipality in Trøndelag county, Norway. It is located in the Lademoen area of the city of Trondheim, immediately north of the old European route E6 highway. It is one of the churches for the Bakklandet og Lademoen parish which is part of the Nidaros domprosti (arch-deanery) in the Diocese of Nidaros. The stone-and-brick Art Nouveau church was built in a cruciform style in 1905 using plans drawn up by the architect Ole Stein. The church seats about 500 people, making it the second-largest church in Trondheim.

== History ==
The church was built in 1905 on the east end of the Lademoen park. The building was constructed out of roughly hewn granite on the exterior with a brick interior. The building was designed using neo-Romanesque and Art Nouveau elements. The building was consecrated on 15 November 1905. From 1954-1956, the church was closed for a major renovation. In 1966, the church received a new roof.

== Media gallery ==
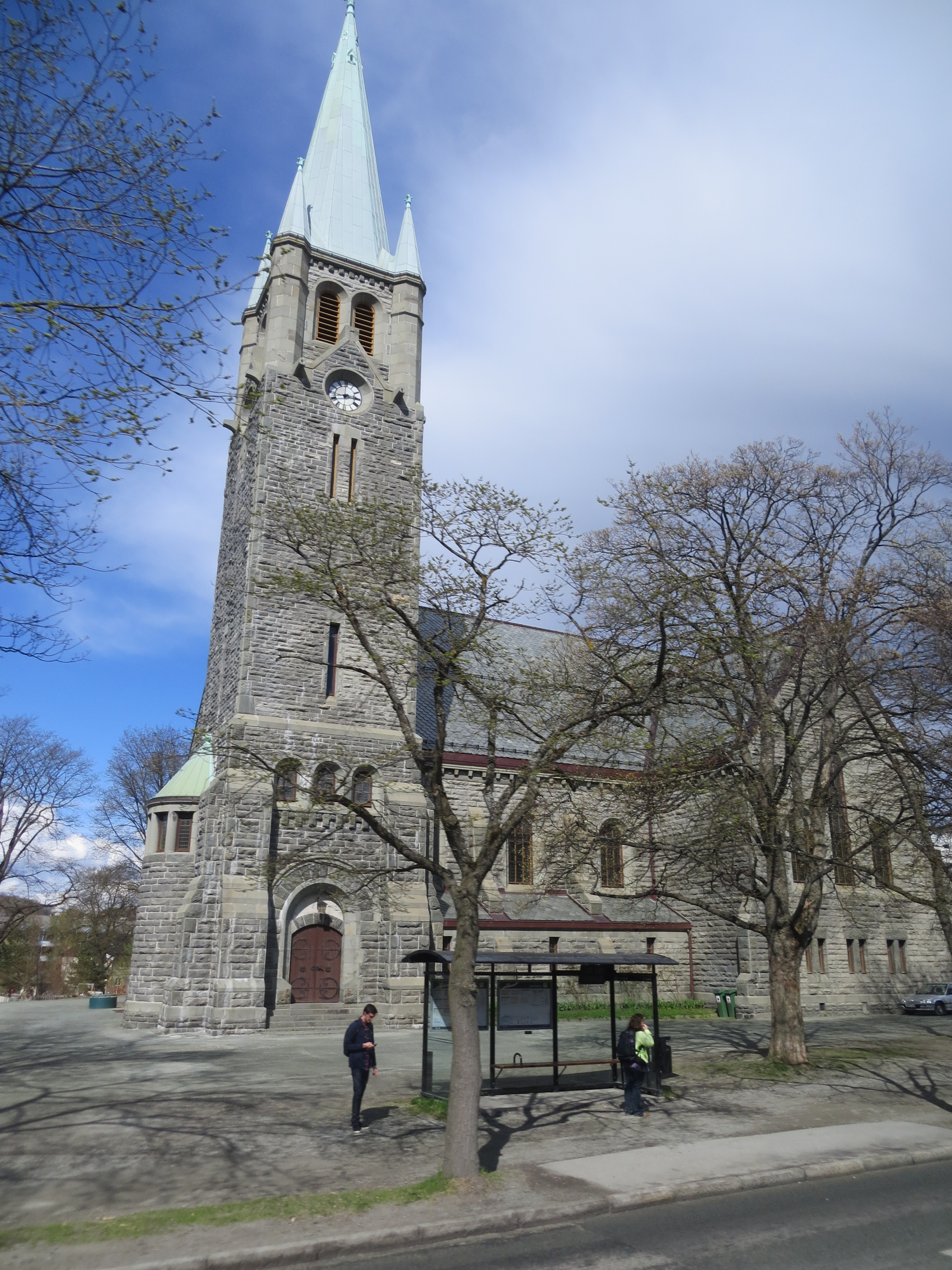
Exterior view

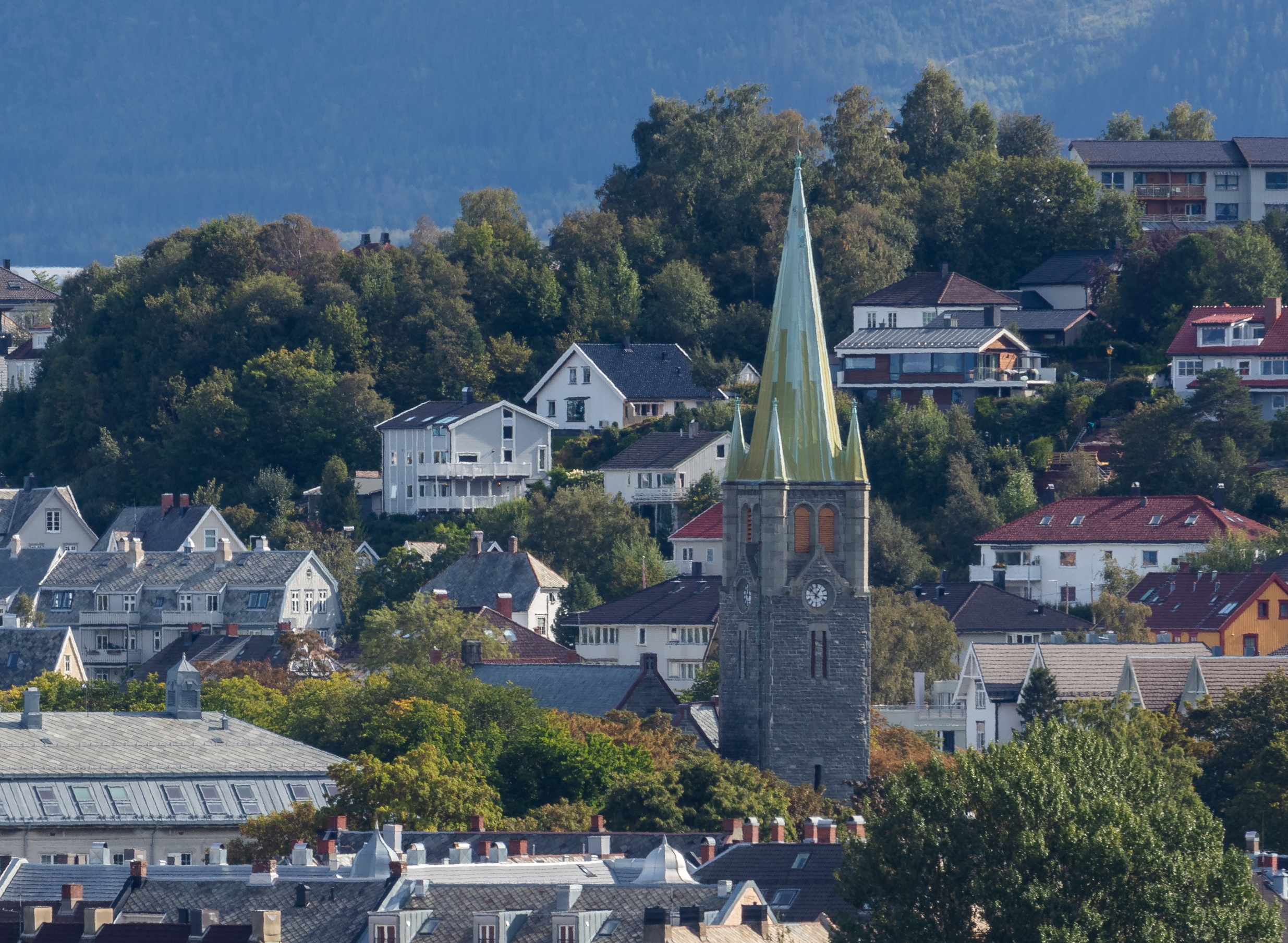
Far view (2019)

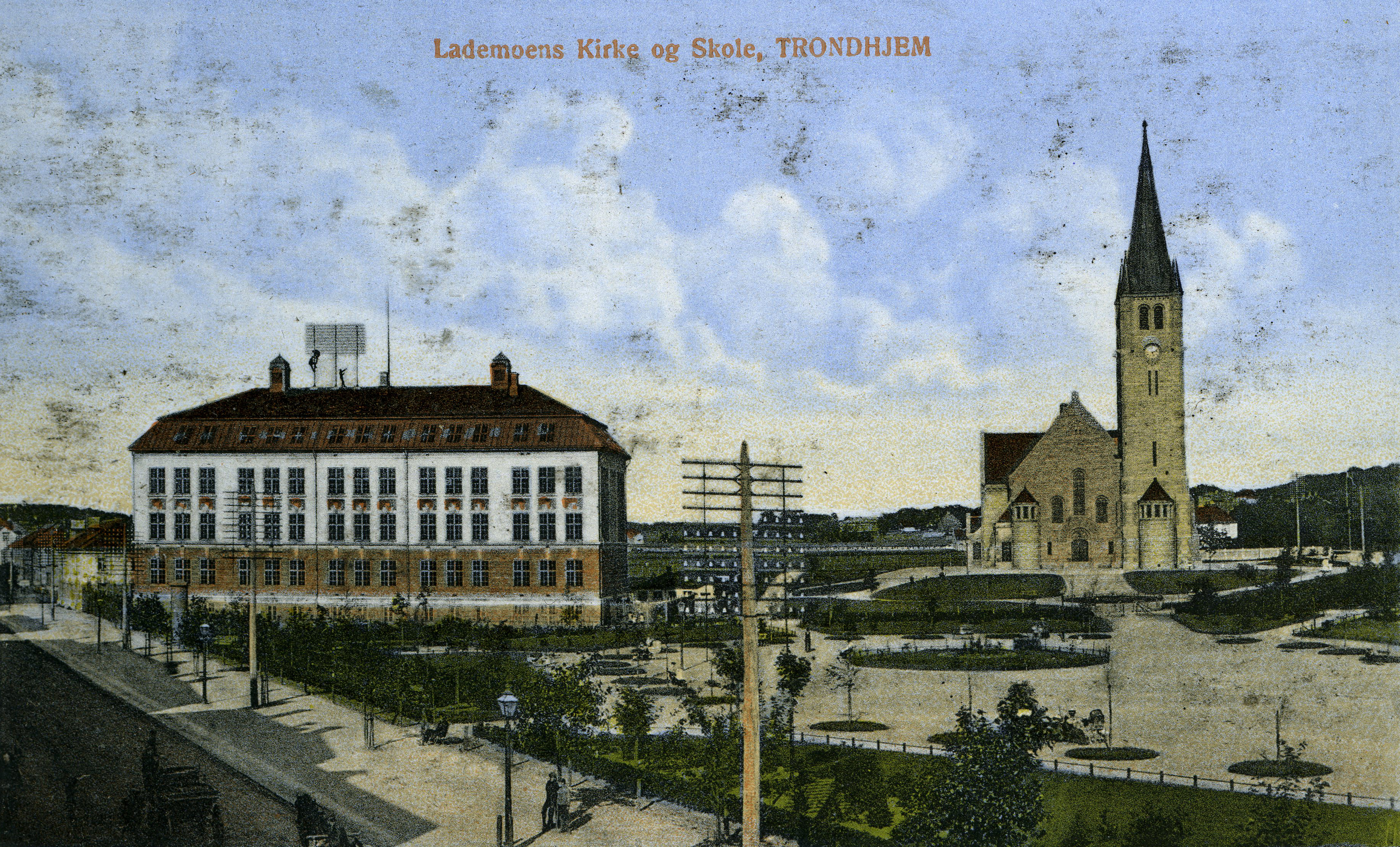
View of the church and nearby school (c. 1915)

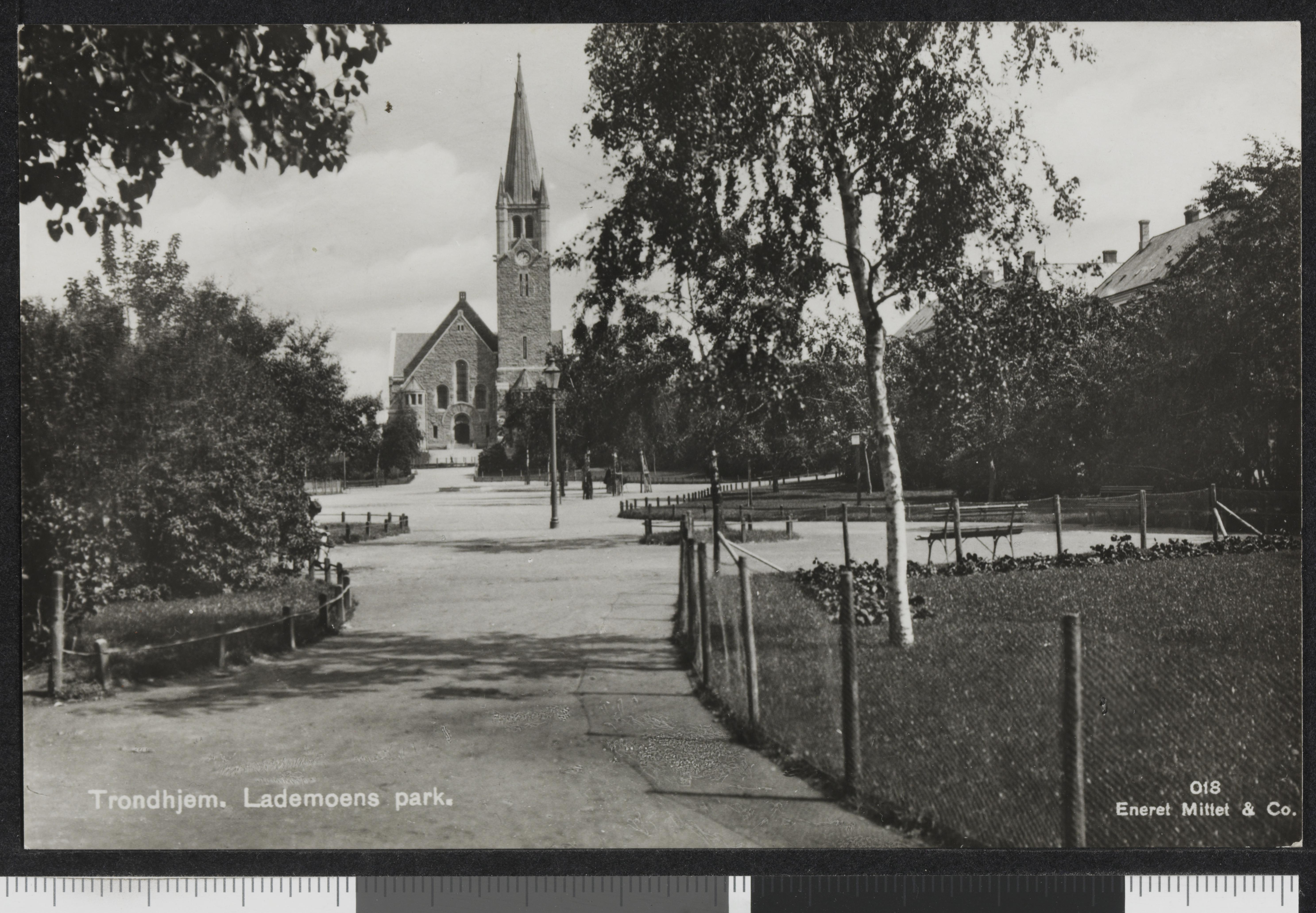
Neighborhood (c. 1925)

== See also ==
- List of churches in Nidaros
