= Rotvoll Station =

Railway station in Trondheim, Norway

Rotvoll
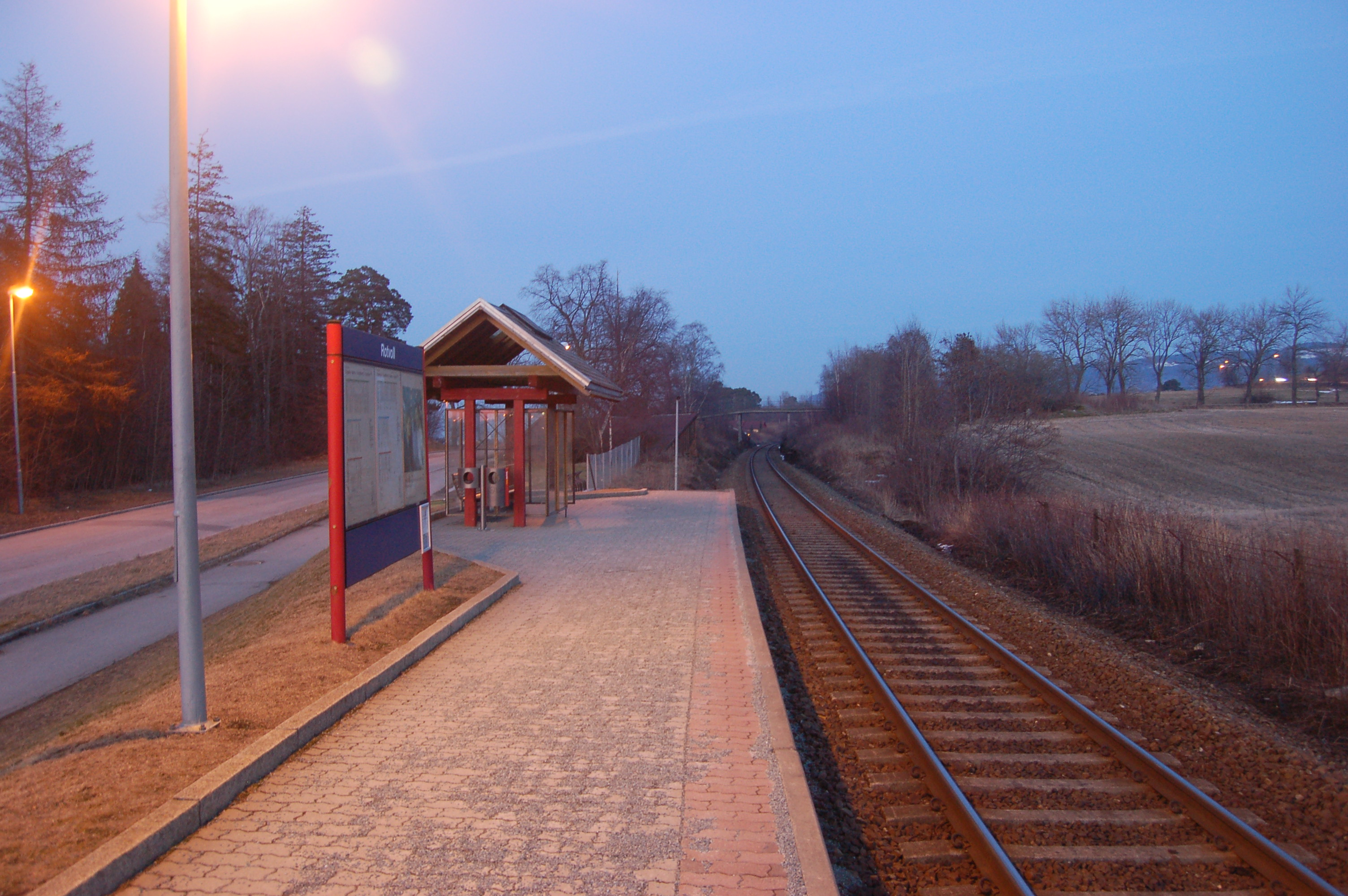

General information
- Location: Rotvoll, Trondheim Municipality; Norway
- Coordinates: 63°26′12″N 10°28′51″E
- Owner: Bane NOR
- Operator: SJ Norge
- Line: Nordland Line
- Distance: 4.31 km (2.68 mi)
- Platforms: 1
- Connections: Bus: AtB

History
- Opened: 1909
Location

Rotvoll is a railway station on the Nordland Line at Rotvoll in Trondheim Municipality, Norway. It is served by the Trøndelag Commuter Rail operated by SJ Norge with hourly service to Trondheim and Steinkjer.

The station is located beside the Equinor offices at Rotvoll. Bus connections are also available with AtB.

Preceding station		Following station
Leangen	Nordland Line	Vikhammer
Preceding station	Local trains	Following station
Leangen	Trøndelag Commuter Rail	Vikhammer
