= Nedre Elvehavn =

Neighborhood in the city of Trondheim, Norway

- Neighborhood in Trondheim
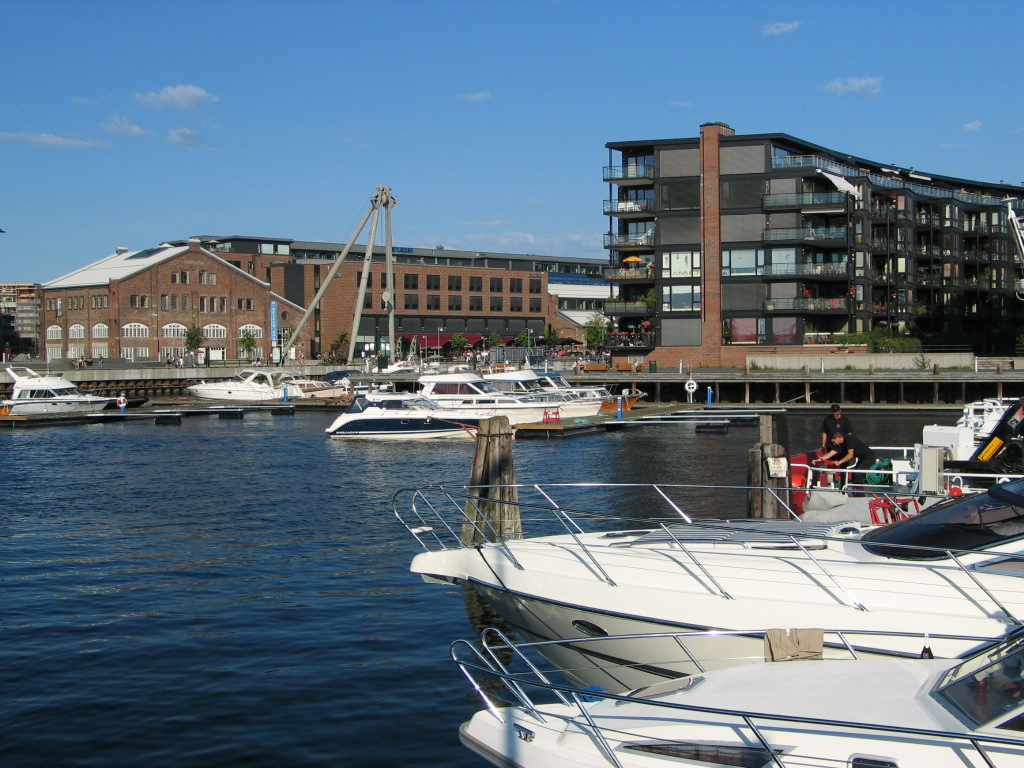
- View of Nedre Elvehavn seen from Midtbyen
- Interactive map of Nedre Elvehavn
- Coordinates: 63.4358°N 10.4150°E
- Country: Norway
- Region: Central Norway
- County: Trøndelag
- Municipality: Trondheim Municipality
- Borough: Østbyen
- Elevation: 1 m (3.3 ft)
- Time zone: UTC+01:00 (CET)
  - Summer (DST): UTC+02:00 (CEST)

Nedre Elvehavn is a neighborhood in the city of Trondheim in Trøndelag county, Norway. It is situated the borough of Østbyen in Trondheim Municipality. The neighborhood is on the east side of the river Nidelva (across the river from the borough of Midtbyen, but Nedre Elvehavn is generally considered to be part of the city center). Nedre Elvehavn is within walking distance of the Midtbyen and Trondheim Central Station. The area is located north of the neighborhood of Bakklandet, west of Møllenberg, and south of Nyhavna. In the late 1990s, the borough went through a major renovation, resulting in a new and expensive area close to the city centre with business, shopping, restaurants, pubs, and housing. Almost all buses running from the east into town stop at Nedre Elvehavn, as does the commuter train service Trønderbanen at Lademoen Station.

The area has developed on the site of Ørens Mekaniske Verksted and Trondheims Mekaniske Verksted, a mechanical workshop that was once the largest employer in Trondheim. The industrial site became disused in the late 1990s and turned into a new high-end area, though some of the original buildings and artifacts have been kept, including a dry dock and a crane. The area includes the shopping centre Solsiden, a hotel, marina, and the Trondheim offices of many companies, including DnB NOR, Vital, PwC, Capgemini, Deloitte, Petrojarl, the British Consulate, the Mexican Consulate, the Polish Consulate, Google, NextGenTel, Radio 1, Scandinavian Airlines, and InCreo Interactive Creations AS. Across the street from Nedre Elvehavn is Trondheim Art Academy, part of the Norwegian University of Science and Technology.
