= Stavne =

Neighborhood in the city of Trondheim, Norway

- Neighborhood in Trondheim
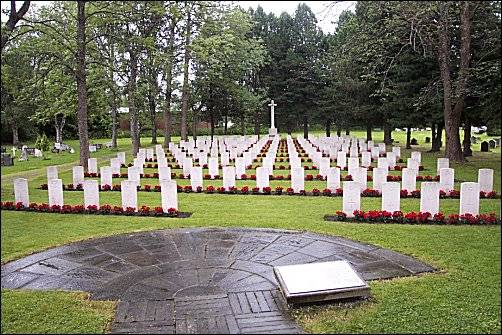
- View of the neighborhood Stavne Cemetery
- Interactive map of Stavne
- Coordinates: 63.4118°N 10.3848°E
- Country: Norway
- Region: Central Norway
- County: Trøndelag
- Municipality: Trondheim Municipality
- Borough: Midtbyen
- Elevation: 22 m (72 ft)
- Time zone: UTC+01:00 (CET)
  - Summer (DST): UTC+02:00 (CEST)

Stavne is a neighbourhood in the city of Trondheim in Trøndelag county, Norway. It is located in the borough of Midtbyen in Trondheim Municipality. It is located on the west shore of the river Nidelva, east of Byåsen. It lies across the river from Elgeseter. The area was previously served the Dovre Line. It is presently served by the Stavne–Leangen Line which runs between Stavne and Leangen.

Stavne is the location of Trondheim (Stavne) Cemetery which is maintained by the Commonwealth War Graves Commission.
