= Lademoen =

Neighborhood in the city of Trondheim, Norway

- Neighborhood in Trondheim
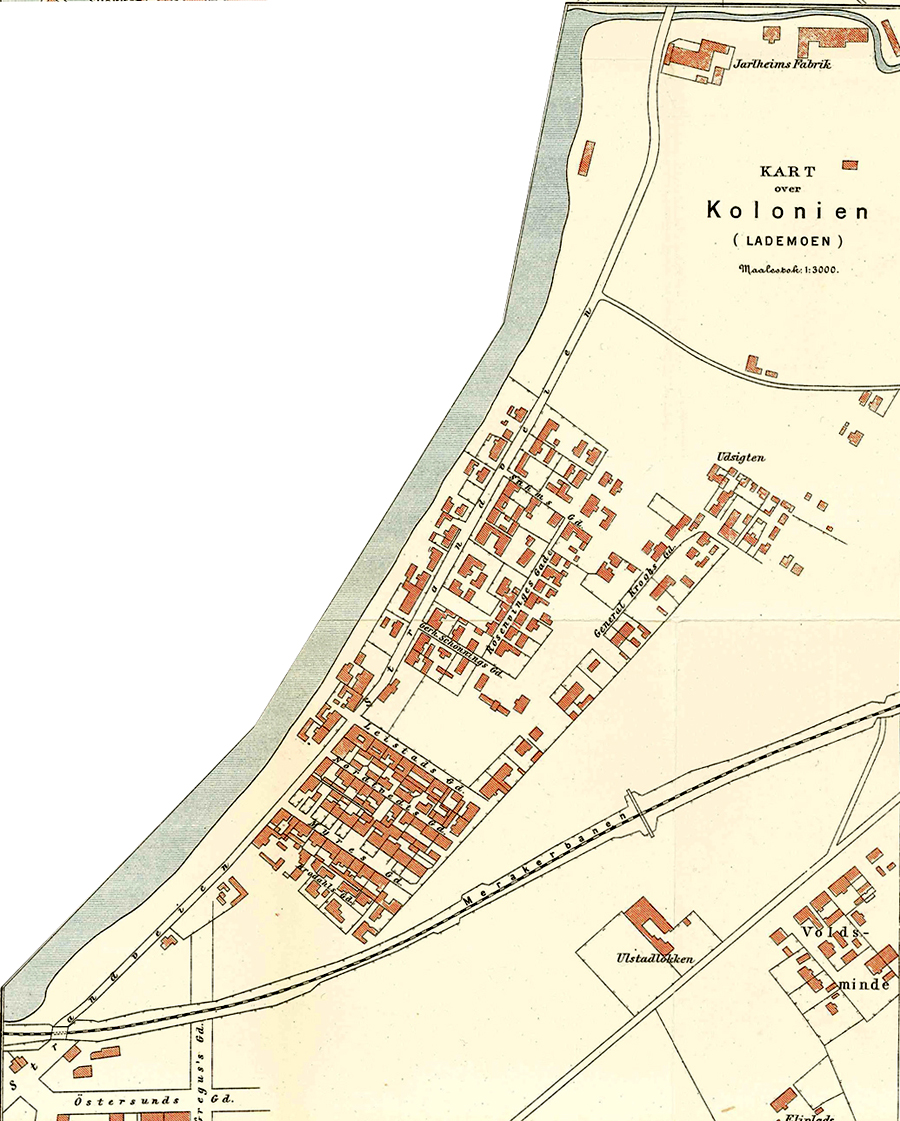
- View of an 1898 map of the neighborhood
- Interactive map of Lademoen
- Coordinates: 63.4374°N 10.4251°E
- Country: Norway
- Region: Central Norway
- County: Trøndelag
- Municipality: Trondheim Municipality
- Borough: Østbyen
- Elevation: 8 m (26 ft)
- Time zone: UTC+01:00 (CET)
  - Summer (DST): UTC+02:00 (CEST)

Lademoen is a neighborhood in the city of Trondheim in Trøndelag county, Norway. It is situated the borough of Østbyen in Trondheim Municipality, about 2 kilometres (1.2 mi) east of Midtbyen, the city centre of Trondheim. Lademoen was transferred from Strinda Municipality to Trondheim Municipality in 1893.

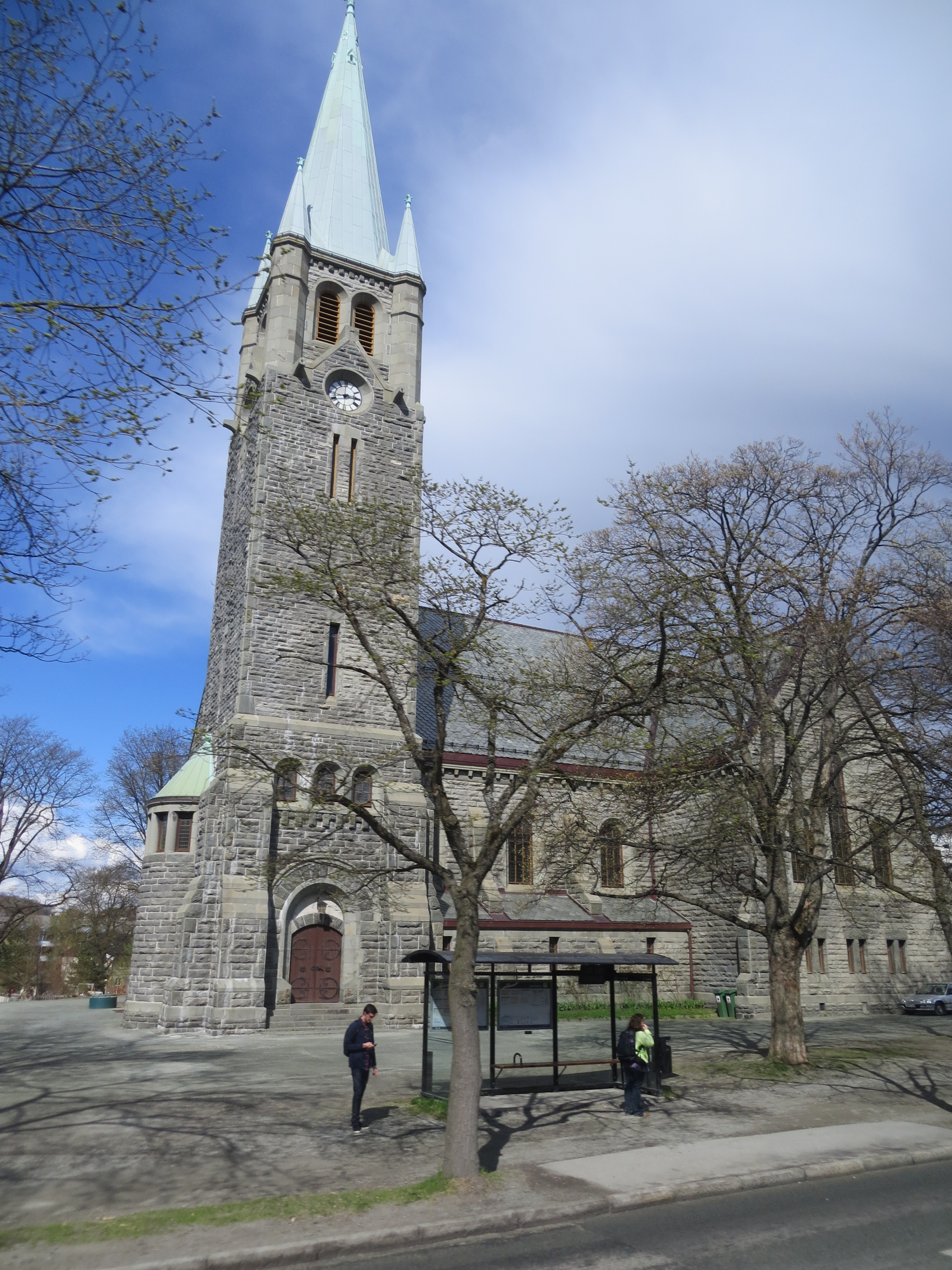
Lademoen Church

The neighborhood is the site of Lademoen Church (Lademoen kirke). The area is served by the Trøndelag Commuter Rail (Trønderbanen) with access at Lilleby Station. All buses east of town stop at Lademoen. Between 1893 and 1988 the Trondheim Tramway had a tram route from the city centre to Lademoen, which was expanded to Lade in 1958.

== See also ==
- Lademoen Station
