= Rotvoll =

Neighborhood in the city of Trondheim, Norway

- Neighborhood in Trondheim
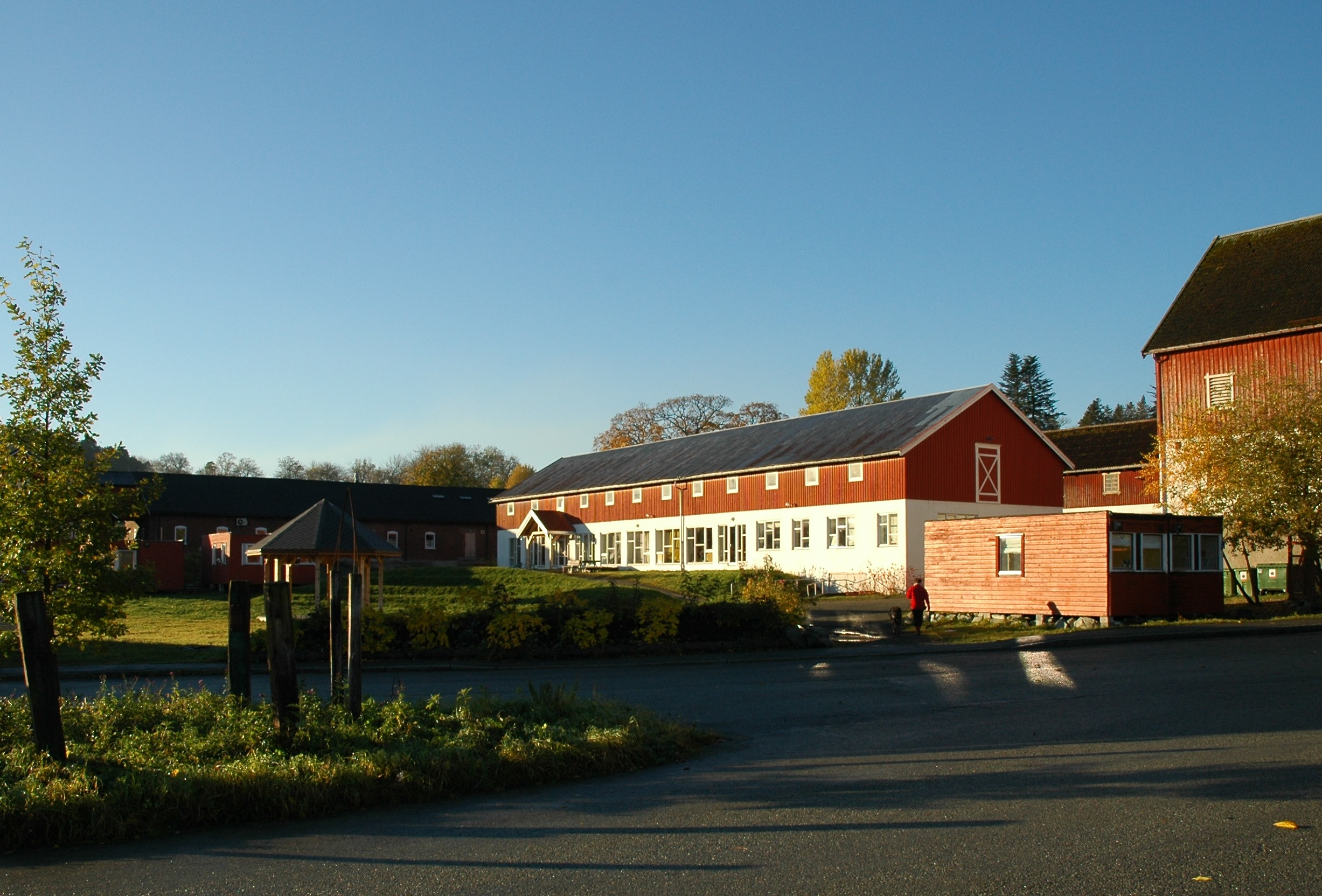
- View of the Rotvoll Waldorf School, Rotvoll farmhouse, and Camphill Rotvoll - Kristoffertunet
- Interactive map of Rotvoll
- Coordinates: 63.4401°N 10.4844°E
- Country: Norway
- Region: Central Norway
- County: Trøndelag
- Municipality: Trondheim Municipality
- Borough: Charlottenlund
- Elevation: 18 m (59 ft)
- Time zone: UTC+01:00 (CET)
  - Summer (DST): UTC+02:00 (CEST)

Rotvoll is a neighbourhood in the city of Trondheim in Trøndelag county, Norway. It is located in the borough of Østbyen in Trondheim Municipality. It is located next to the Trondheimsfjord between Leangen to the west and Grillstad to the east.

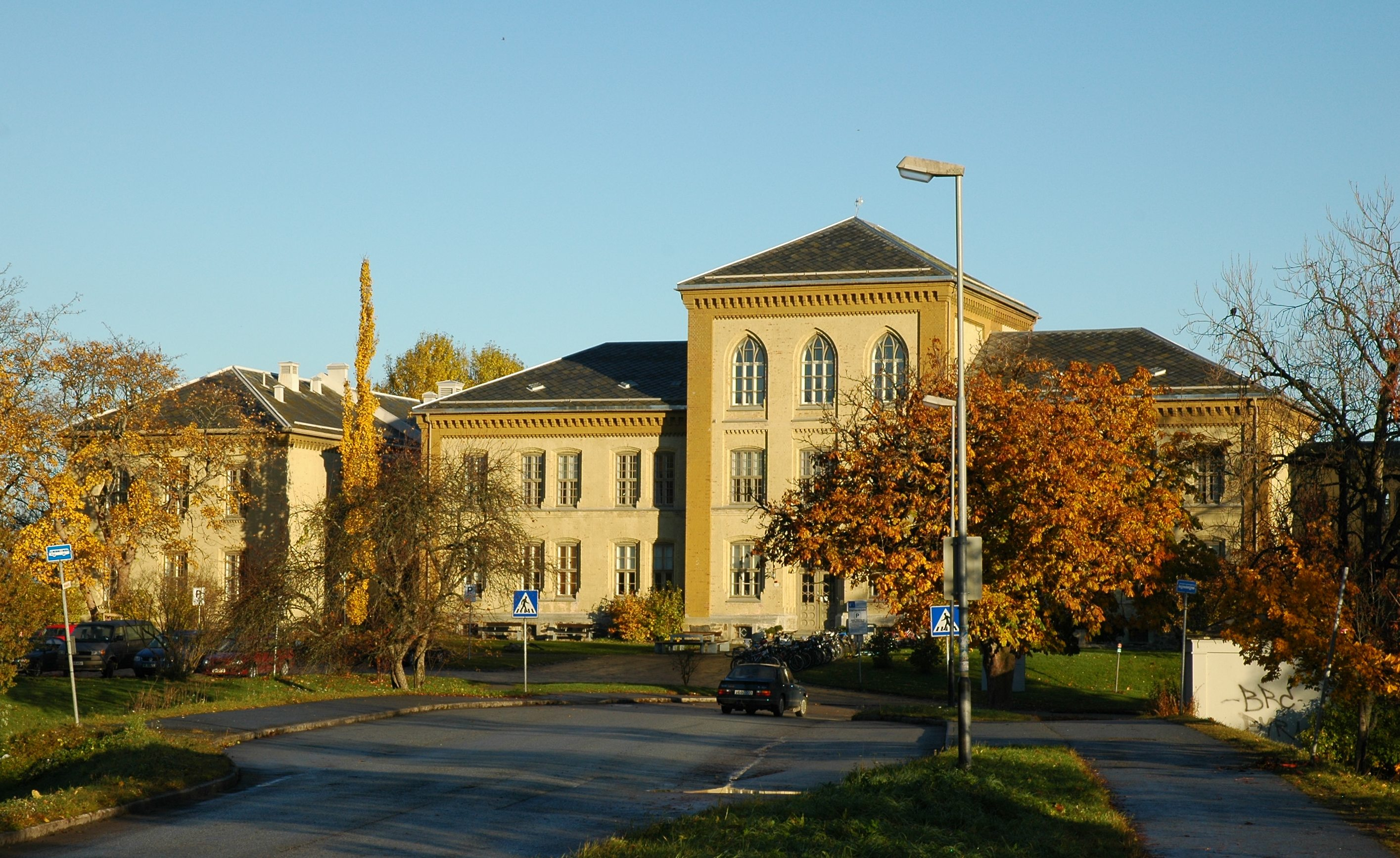
Sør-Trøndelag University College (formerly Rotvoll Asylum) near Rotvoll. Designed by Ole Falck Ebbell(1872)

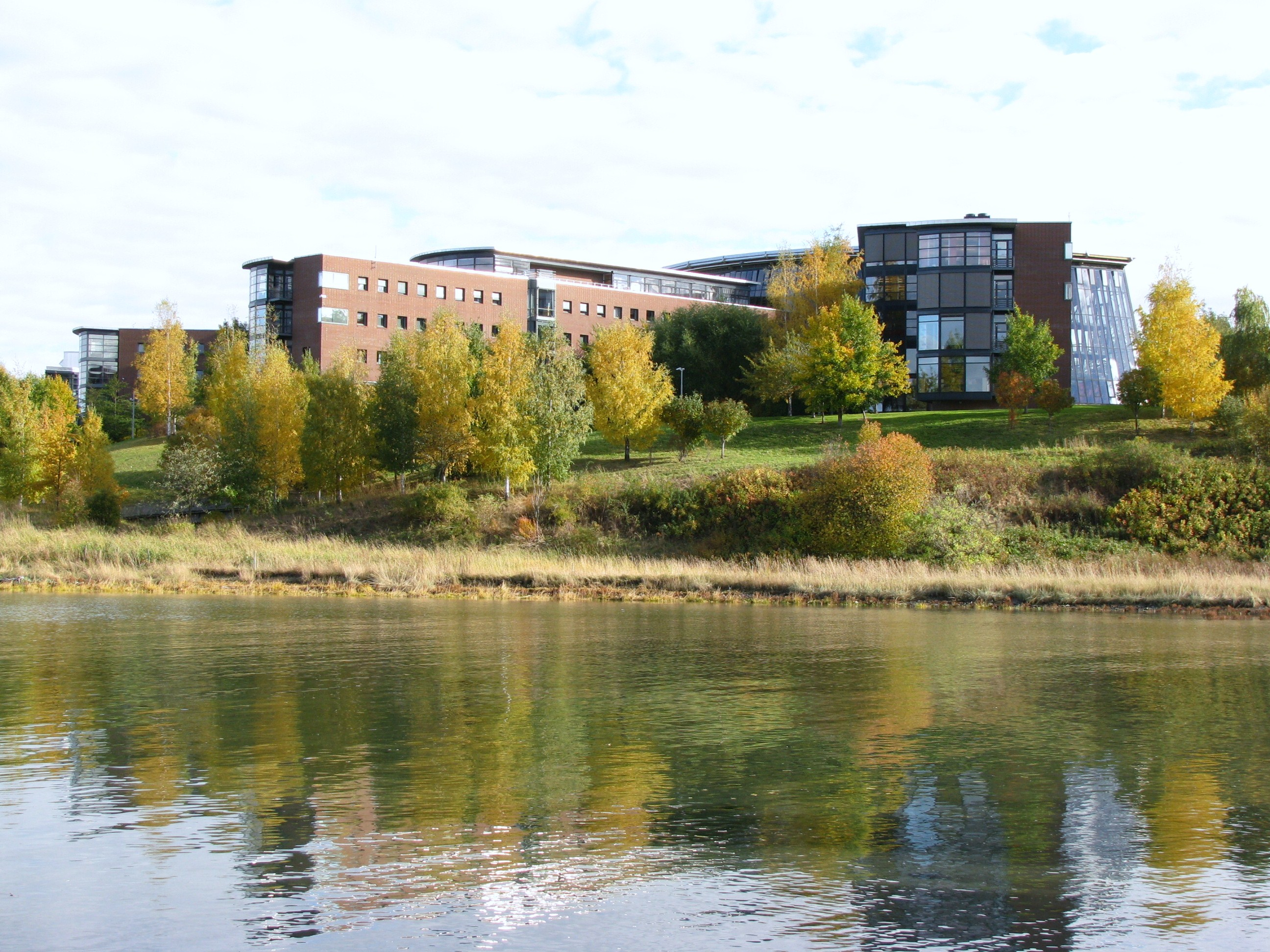
Statoil research and development facility at Rotvoll

The area is known for its rich bird life and has several times been proposed for protection. When a Statoil research and development facility was built there in the 1991, a months-long protest and civil disobedience ensued.

The area has some suburban housing and is otherwise dominated by the Statoil research facility and Sør-Trøndelag University College campus for teacher training and Norwegian Sign Language interpreters. Rotvoll is served by city buses and by Rotvoll Station on Trønderbanen, the commuter train in Trøndelag. There are also several conjoint Anthroposophical projects:

- Camphill Rotvoll (Camphill Rotvoll - Kristoffertunet) is an intentional community, consisting of 3 family houses; a mixed community with 25 people, some of whom with special needs. Camphill Rotvoll run several workshops: Rotvoll Safteri - a juice and jam facility, Rotvoll landhandel - a general store with mostly bio- dynamic foodstuffs and Rotvoll farm as well as a bakery, weavery and a small market-garden.
- Rotvoll Waldorf School (Steinerskolen på Rotvoll) is a school is based on the educational philosophy of Rudolf Steiner, the founder of anthroposophy.

== See also ==
- Camphill Movement
- Waldorf education
