= Sør-Trøndelag University College =

Former Norwegian University

Coordinates: 63°25′43″N 10°23′18″E

- Høgskolen i Sør-Trøndelag
- Type: State College
- Established: 1994
- Rector: Trond Michael Andersen
- Administrative staff: 780
- Students: 8,000
- Undergraduates: 8,000
- Postgraduates: 150
- Location: Trondheim, Norway
- Website: hist.no

Sør-Trøndelag University College (Norwegian: Høgskolen i Sør-Trøndelag) or HiST was a Norwegian university college located in Trondheim. The school offered higher education within nursing, teaching, economics, food science, engineering and information technology. The college had six campuses throughout the city and was created in 1994 as a merger between a number of independent colleges in the city. In January 2016, HiST merged with Norwegian University of Science and Technology and Aalesund University College and Gjøvik University College.

== Faculties ==
- Faculty of Health Education and Social Work, located at Leangen
- Faculty of Nursing, located at Øya
- Faculty of Informatics and e-Learning, located at Kalvskinnet
- Faculty of Teacher Education and Deaf Studies, located at Rotvoll
- Faculty of Technology, located at Kalvskinnet, Tunga and Øya
- Faculty of Business Administration, Trondheim Business School, located at Moholt

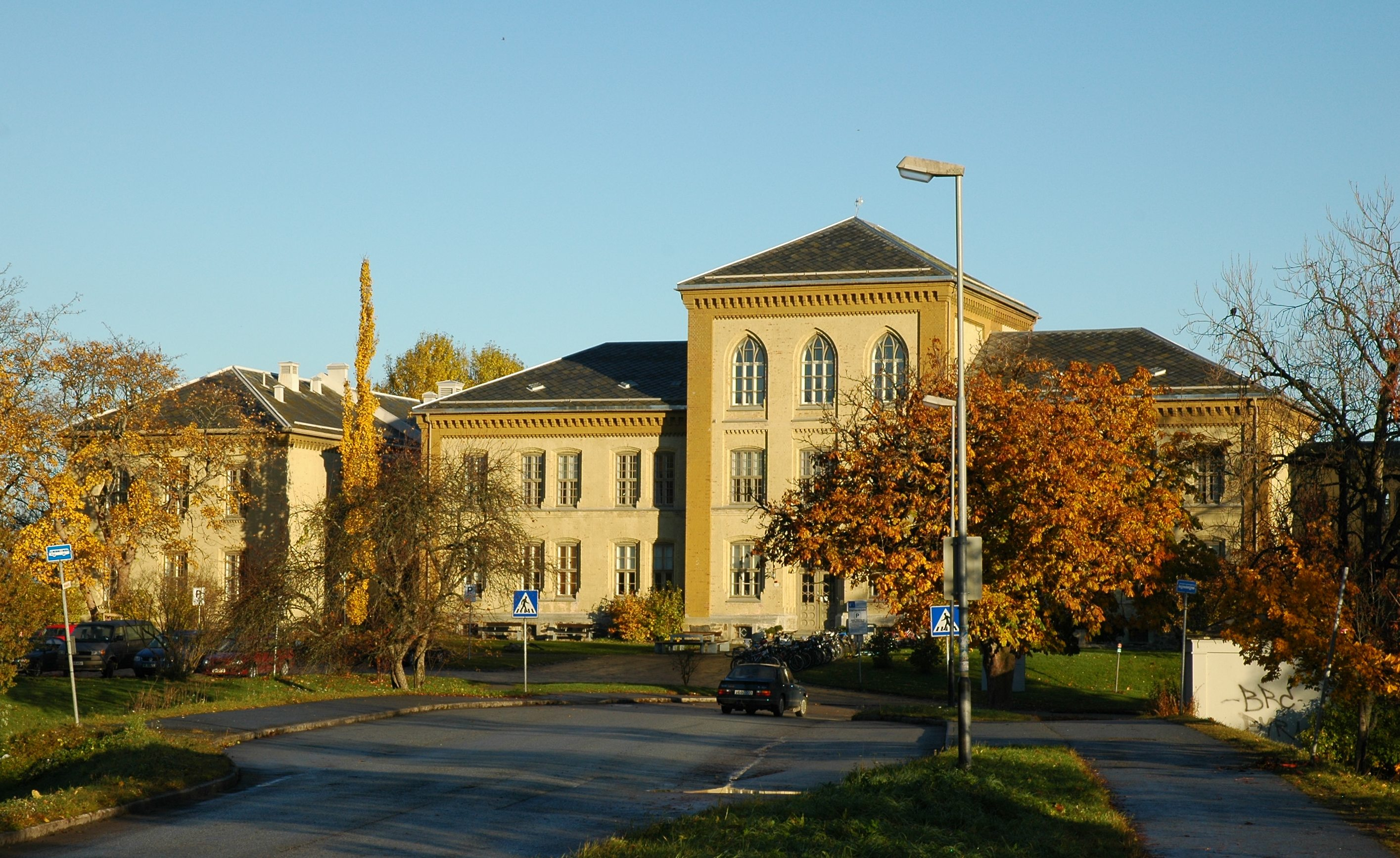
Faculty of Teacher Education and Deaf Studies – formerly Rotvoll Asylum (1872) designed by Ole Falck Ebbell

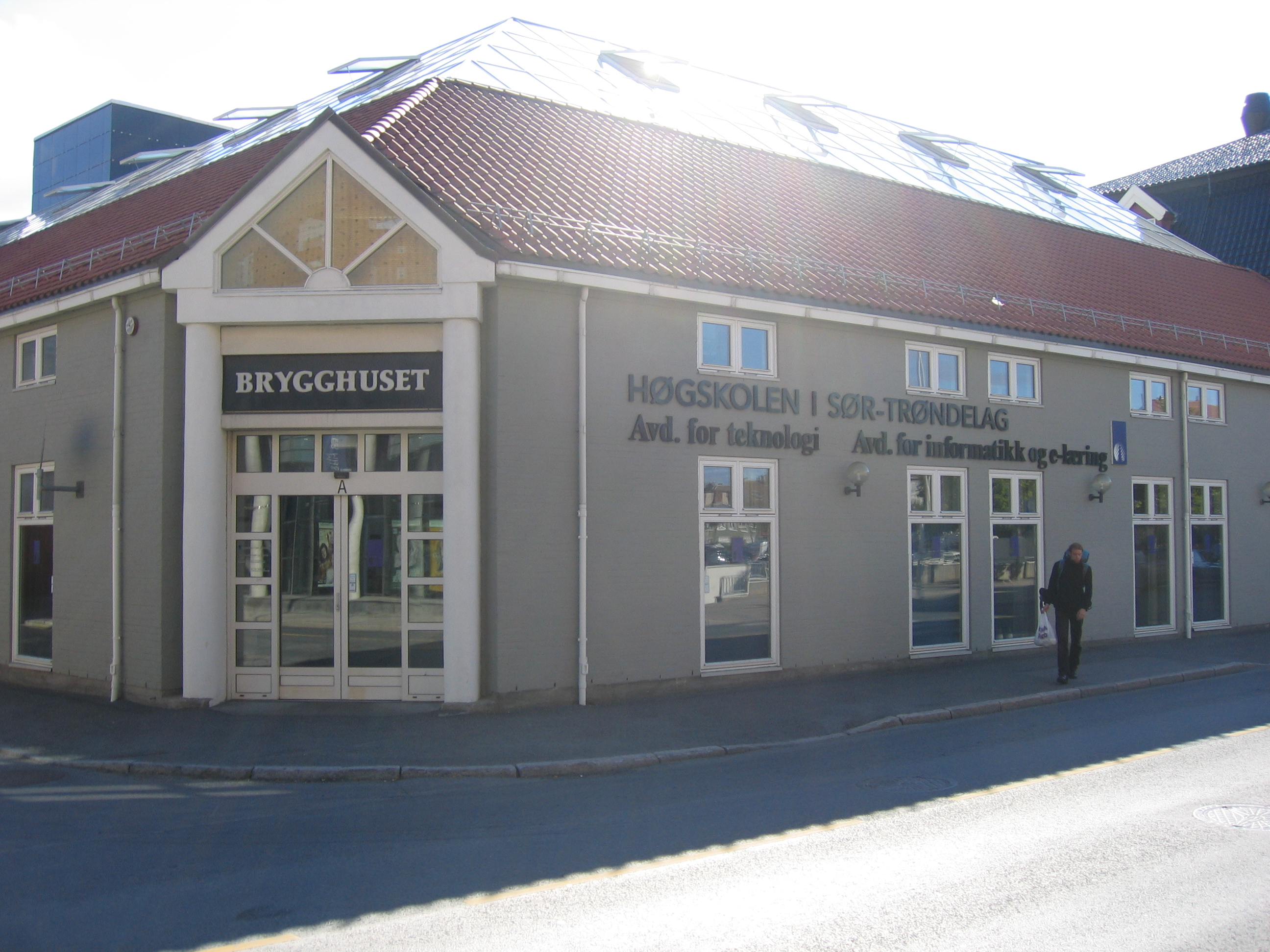
Kalvskinnet Faculty of Informatics and e-Learning
