= Trondheim Academy of Fine Art =

Coordinates: 63.4340°N 10.4139°E

Trondheim Academy of Fine Art is a department of the Norwegian University of Science and Technology (NTNU) in Trondheim, Norway responsible for Bachelor and Master education within fine art. Located at a separate campus at Nedre Elvehavn it is part of the Faculty of Architecture and Fine Art.

The academy was created after World War II and in 1979 a college and from 1987 a state art academy. It was merged into NTNU in 1996.
