= InCreo Interactive Creations AS =

InCreo
- Company type: Private company
- Industry: Information technology
- Founded: 1997
- Headquarters: Trondheim, Norway
- Area served: Scandinavia
- Key people: Hallgrim Bjørvik, CEO
- Products: Web design, web hosting
- Services: IT consulting
- Revenue: ▲NOK 24 million (2020)
- Number of employees: 35 (2020)
- Website: www.increo.no

InCreo Interactive Creations AS (InCreo in short) is a Norwegian software corporation founded in 2000 with headquarters in Trondheim and departments in Oslo and Bodø. InCreo primarily develops custom software for corporate or governmental websites. InCreo has developed their own CMS, the InCreo CMS.

== History ==
Bjørviks webdesign was founded by Hallgrim Bjørvik in 1997. This company was in 2000 converted to an employee-owned company. In 2004, the department in Bodø opened, and the Oslo department opened in 2009. In the start, the company focused on Internet hosting services, the later years the main focus has been on developing web sites, webdesign and webshops.

During the last tree years, InCreo has been credited for their work in the Norwegian Gulltaggen competition a reward for web design and web sites.

== Technology ==
InCreo's software and CMS is based on the Microsoft ASP.NET platform.

== Services ==
Its service offerings include:

- IT Consulting
- Webdesign
- Internet hosting services
- Application Development
- Application Management
