= Trondhjems mekaniske Værksted =

Company

Coordinates: 63°26′1″N 10°24′29″E

Aktieselskabet Trondhjems mekaniske Værksted
- Industry: Shipyard
- Founded: 1872
- Defunct: 1960
- Fate: Merger
- Successor: Aker
- Headquarters: Trondheim, Norway
- Key people: Sophus August Weidemann (founder)

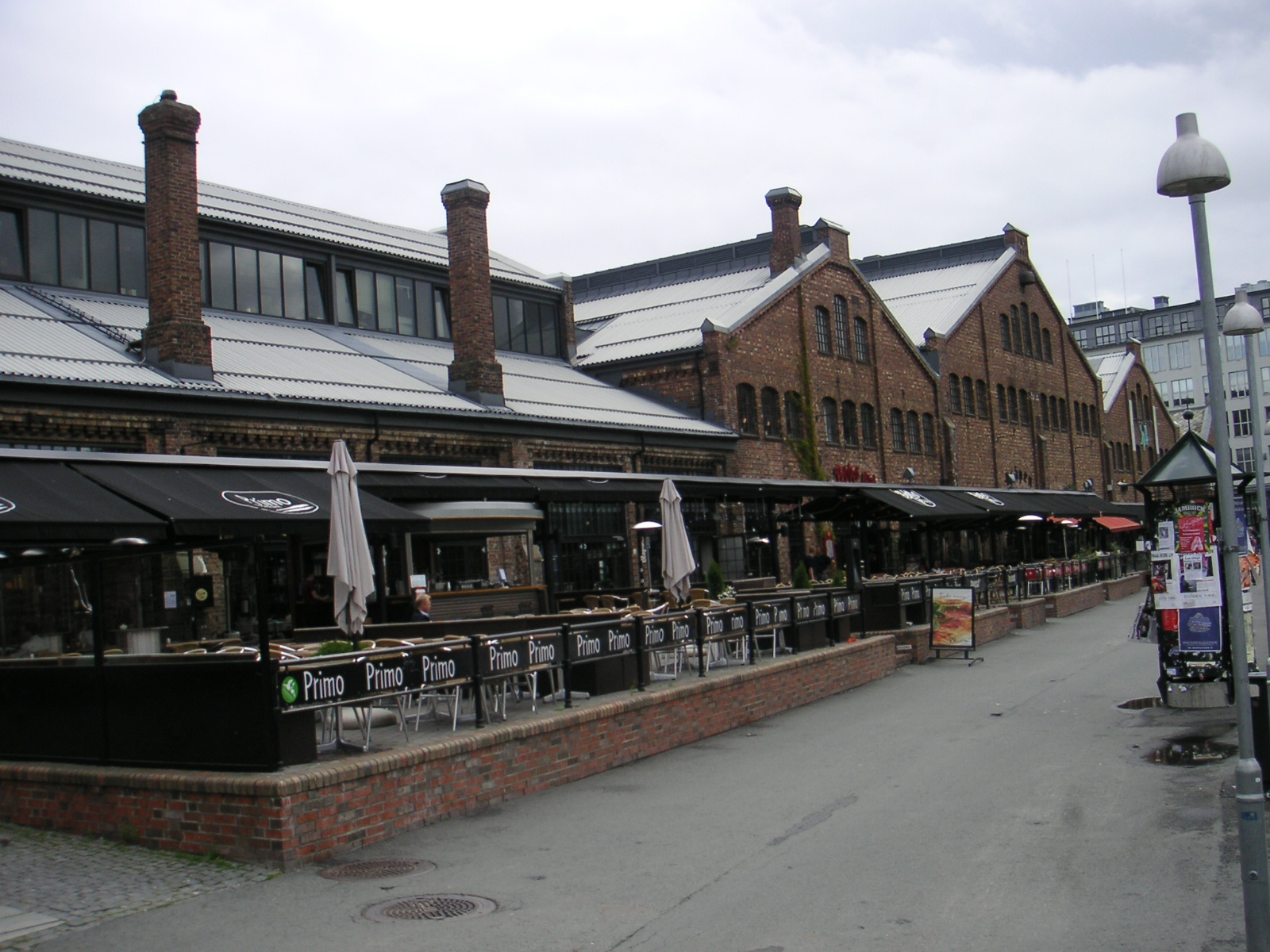
Former site of TMV

Trondhjems mekaniske Værksted or TMV was a major shipbuilding company in Trondheim, Norway.

== History ==
It was founded in 1872 by engineer and industrialist Sophus August Weidemann. Weidemann started in 1864 as the manager of one of the pioneer companies in Trondheim. Weidemann resigned from his managerial position in 1871 and founded Trondhjems mekaniske Værksted the following year.

The company grew gradually until the turn of the century when it had over 700 employees and was one of Norway's largest companies. For many years TMV was the biggest employer in Trondheim.

When Germany invaded Norway in 1940, it pressed TMV into war service. German authorities seized the ship SS Springfjord, which TMV had launched in 1939 and was completing for a British shipping company, and assigned it to the Deutsche Dampfschiffahrts-Gesellschaft "Hansa" (DDG Hansa).

In 1960 the Norwegian holding company Aker bought the majority of TMV's shares, merging them into the Aker Group. The company was closed in 1983.

The former location of the company's shipbuilding business is still referred to as TMV by some citizens of Trondheim. The site currently houses the offices of the Nedre Elvehavn borough of Trondheim. The entire area has been subject to an urban renewal project. Solsiden shopping centre was built on the grounds in October 2000, and the surrounding area now has several apartment buildings and a hotel.

The history of the area as a shipyard is preserved; the dry docks, many of the company buildings, and even some of the shipbuilding equipment (such as a large crane) is still present. When a pedestrian bridge connecting Nedre Elvehavn to the city centre of Trondheim was built in 2003, it was named Verftsbrua, meaning "the (ship)yard bridge".
