= Gjøvik University College =

University college in Norway

Coordinates: 60.790039°N 10.683049°E

- Høgskolen i Gjøvik
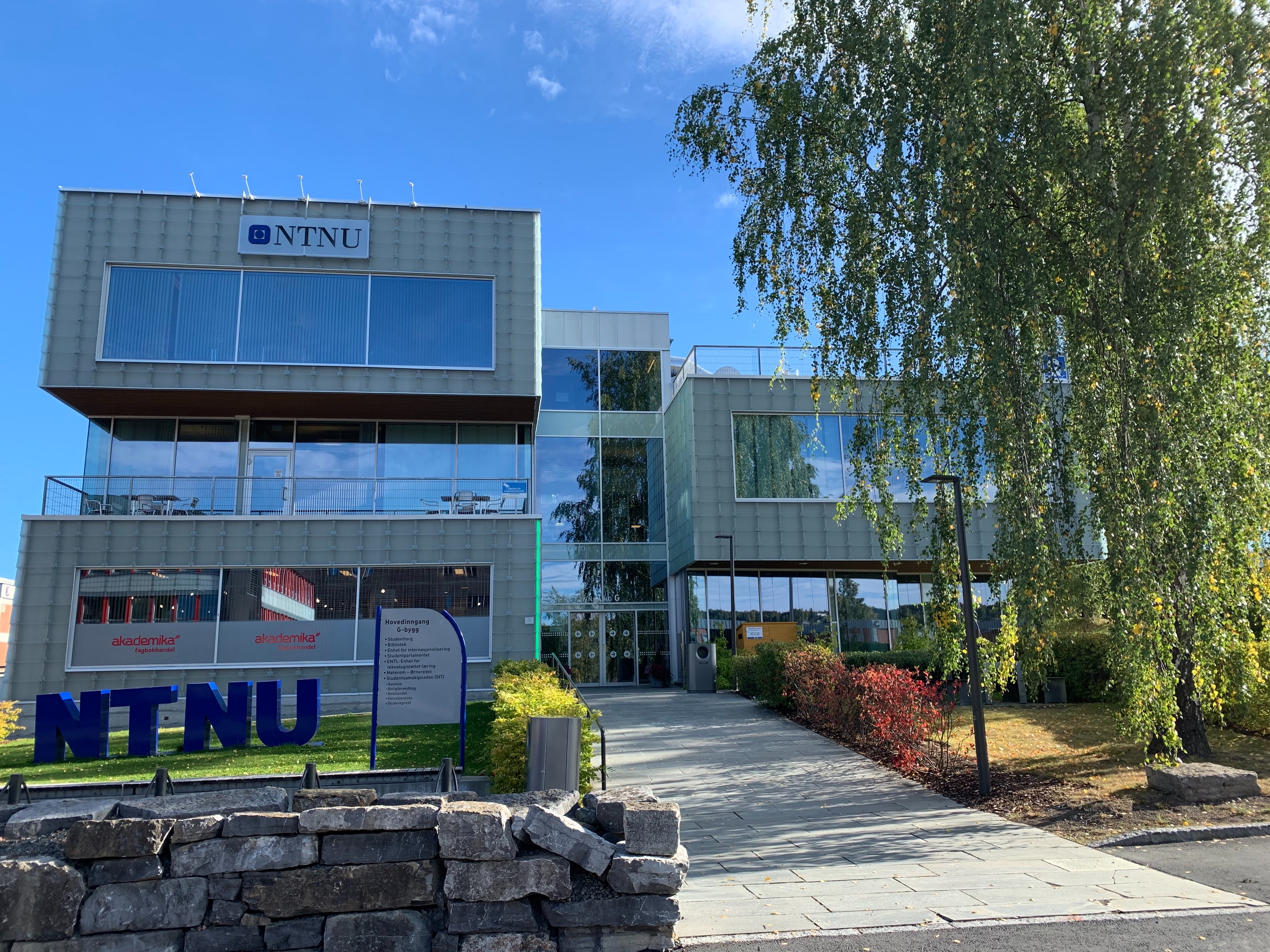
- Type: Public
- Established: 1 August 1994
- Location: Gjøvik, Norway
- Website: http://english.hig.no/

Gjøvik University College (Norwegian: Høgskolen i Gjøvik, HiG) is a university college in Norway. In January 2016, Gjøvik University College joined the Norwegian University of Science and Technology (known as NTNU). HiG is now referred to as the NTNU campus in Gjøvik.

== College ==
Gjøvik University College was established 1 August 1994 in the town of Gjøvik when two governmental colleges Gjøvik College of Engineering and Oppland College of Nursing were combined as part of the reform of Norway's colleges. In 2007, Gjøvik University College took over BI Norwegian Business School's operations in the region.

It has approximately 2800 students and 280 employees. The University College is led by an executive board, and its rector, deans and section heads. The institution has three faculties:

- Faculty of Health, Care and Nursing
- Faculty of Computer Science and Media Technology
- Faculty of Technology, Economy and Management

== Profile ==
Gjøvik University College is a research-intensive university college. It is seeking to focus all its activities, research and education.

1. Challenges to the future welfare of Norway's citizens.
2. Challenges with respect to the future of value creation in Norway.
3. Environmental challenges (including sustainability and climate adaptation challenges).
4. Security challenges.

== Study programs ==
Gjøvik University College offers a number of study programs in the areas of Health, Computer Science, Engineering, Media Technologies, and Business Management. Most areas are offered at both Bachelor and Master levels, some also on PhD level. There are also a number of shorter programs and offers for continued education

The University College has introduced value creation (including innovation, entrepreneurship and quality-increasing processes) as a component in all its study programs. In addition, it offers a separate bachelor program in Media Management and Innovation. The Innovatorion is the college's interdisciplinary idea lab, a workshop for the development of ideas and projects where students, researchers and external companies collaborate on projects, mock businesses and real businesses. Participation in a 24-hour ideas competition "Idélab-24" is mandatory for all students.

The University College offers research education in all its faculties. All master's programs offer paths to doctoral programs, either to one of the college's own programs or in collaboration with other universities. The college has its own PhD programs in computer science and in information security. The college is also a member of several Graduate Schools, including the Norwegian Research School in Technology and the European Graduate School in Technology (EuTec). The research schools integrate the research education resources of their members, offering their PhD students free flow of services like courses, supervision and industry collaboration.

Gjøvik University College is internationally oriented, with employees of 21 nationalities. Most of the masters programs are offered in English. The students can choose several paths towards a high level of internationalization, or continue the study at a partner university abroad after finishing a degree at Gjøvik.

== Research ==
Gjøvik University College is a research-intensive university college. It has PhD programs in Computer Science and Information Security. The University College has a number of research labs, some of them unique in Scandinavia, including:

- Center for Care Research
- Norwegian Research Laboratory for Universal Design
- Norwegian Information Security Laboratory (NISlab)
- Norwegian Biometrics Laboratory
- Testimon Forensic Laboratory
- Media Technology Laboratory (MTL)
- The Color and Media Computing Laboratory

== Sources ==
- NTNU in Gjøvik Campus
