= Røra Municipality =

Former municipality in Trøndelag, Norway

Røra Municipality Røra herad
- Former municipality
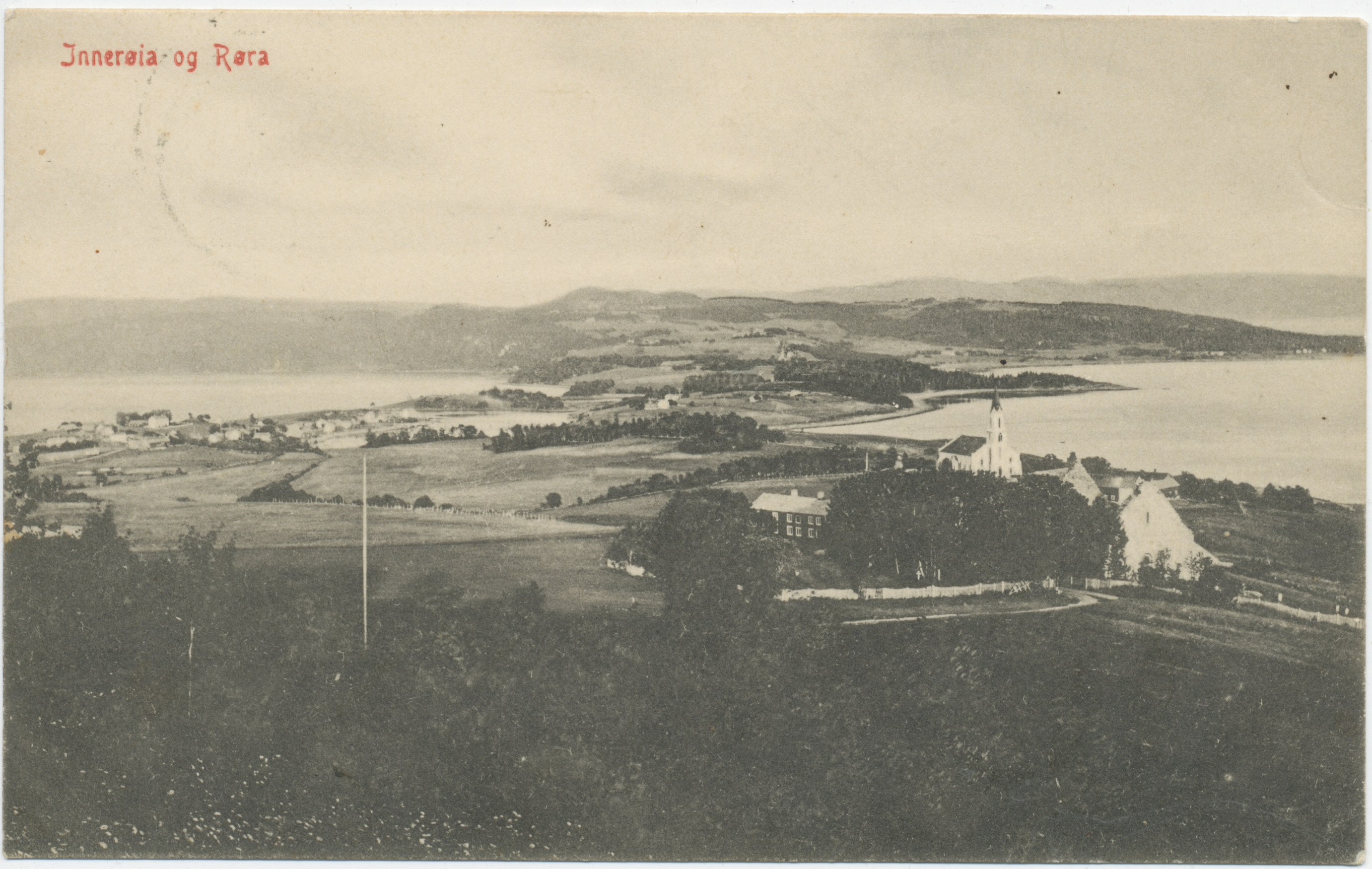
- View of Røra in the background (the Old Sakshaug Church is in the foreground)

- Nord-Trøndelag within Norway

- Røra within Nord-Trøndelag
- Coordinates: 63°51′27″N 11°24′00″E
- Country: Norway
- County: Nord-Trøndelag
- District: Innherred
- Established: 1 Jan 1907
  - Preceded by: Inderøy Municipality
- Disestablished: 1 Jan 1962
  - Succeeded by: Inderøy Municipality
- Administrative centre: Røra

Government
  - Mayor (1960–1961): Jens Austad (Sp)

Area (upon dissolution)
  - Total: 28.9 km^{2} (11.2 sq mi)
  - Rank: #648 in Norway
- Highest elevation: 442 m (1,450 ft)

Population (1961)
  - Total: 1,011
  - Rank: #640 in Norway
  - Density: 35/km^{2} (91/sq mi)
  - Change (10 years): ▲ +3.7%
- Demonym: Rørbygg

Official language
  - Norwegian form: Nynorsk
- Time zone: UTC+01:00 (CET)
  - Summer (DST): UTC+02:00 (CEST)
- ISO 3166 code: NO-1730

Røra is a former municipality in the old Nord-Trøndelag county, Norway. The 29-square-kilometre (11 sq mi) municipality existed from 1907 until its dissolution in 1962. It was located at the northeastern end of the Trondheimsfjorden, just north of the towns of Verdalsøra and Levanger. It is located in what is now the southeastern part of Inderøy Municipality in Trøndelag county. The administrative centre of the municipality was the village of Røra where Salberg Church is located.

Prior to its dissolution in 1962, the 28.9-square-kilometre (11.2 sq mi) municipality was the 648th largest by area out of the 731 municipalities in Norway. Røra Municipality was the 640th most populous municipality in Norway with a population of about 1,011. The municipality's population density was 35 inhabitants per square kilometre (91/sq mi) and its population had increased by 3.7% over the previous 10-year period.

== General information ==
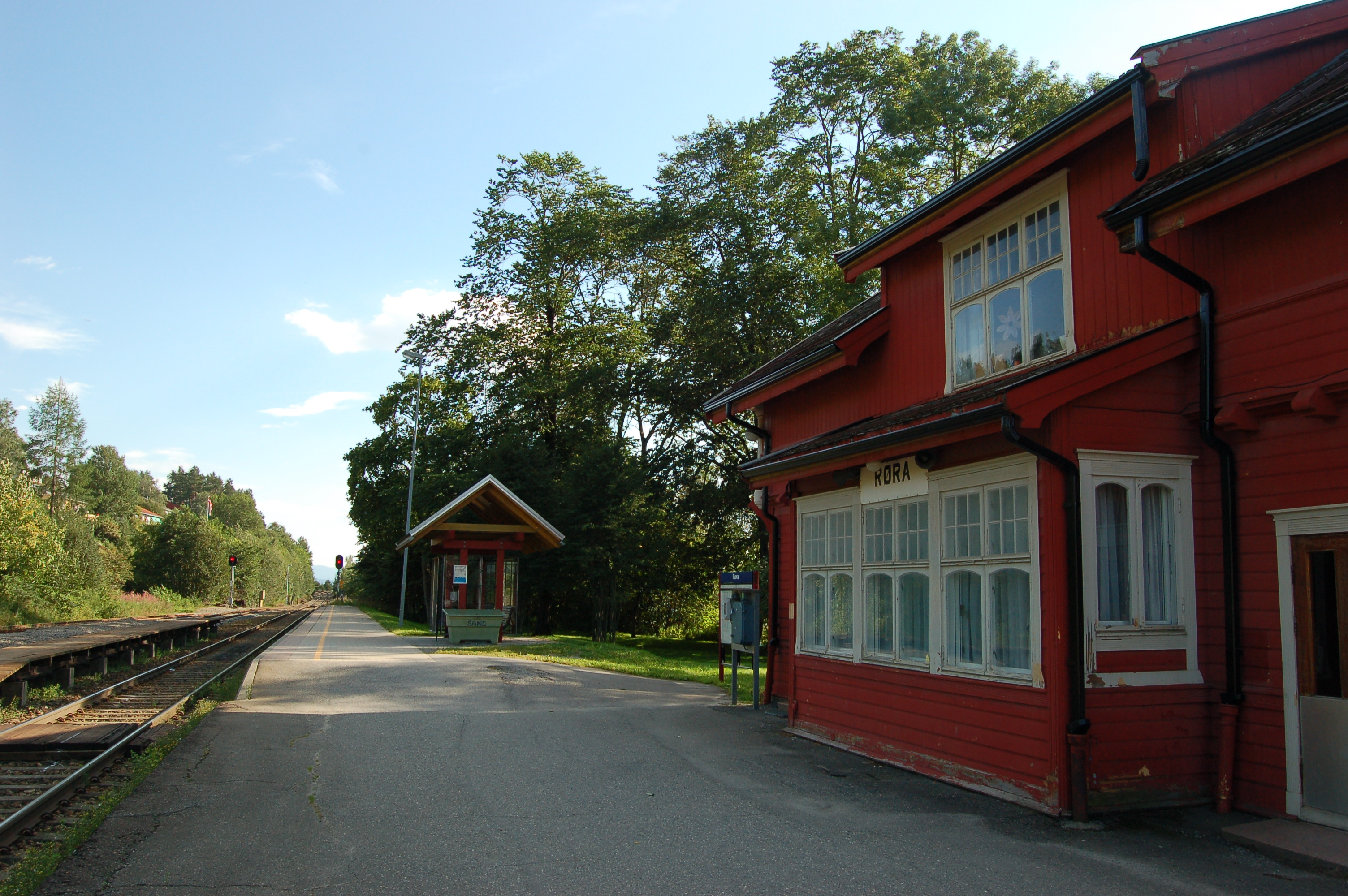
View of the local railway station, Røra Station.

The municipality of Røra was established on 1 January 1907 when the old Inderøy Municipality was divided into three: Røra Municipality (population: 866) in the southeast, Hustad Municipality (population: 732) in the north, and Inderøy Municipality (population: 2,976) in the west. In 1950, Røra had 947 residents and an area of about 29 square kilometres (11 sq mi).

During the 1960s, there were many municipal mergers across Norway due to the work of the Schei Committee. On 1 January 1962, Røra Municipality (population: 1,003), Sandvollan Municipality (population: 750), and Inderøy Municipality (population: 3,194) were merged to form a new, larger Inderøy Municipality.

=== Name ===
The municipal name is Røra which is an old name for the area (Old Norse: Ryr). The name likely comes from the genitive case of the word hrœrar which means "groin", probably referring to the shape of the bay near Røra.

=== Churches ===
The Church of Norway had one parish (sokn) within Røra Municipality. At the time of the municipal dissolution, it was part of the Inderøy prestegjeld and the Nord-Innherad prosti (deanery) in the Diocese of Nidaros.

Churches in Røra Municipality
Parish (sokn)	Church name	Location of the church	Year built
Røra	Røra Church	Røra	1715

== Geography ==
Røra lies between Stiklestad and Mære, and is in an area of rich historical monuments. An early highway, The King's Road (Norwegian: kongevei), was at a higher elevation than the current highway. Along this route there are several minor finds from earlier habitation. On the boundary between Nedre Vådal and Røflo remains have been found from a very old habitation, probably from the Iron Age. Defense works indicate that the habitation must have been over a long period and been substantial. The location was on a small peninsula between the Trondheimsfjorden and Børgin.

The entire landscape has been changed after a major landslide in the 14th century. Most of the disturbed mass slid into Hylla fjord, but some was diverted to Borgen fjord. The source of the slide is thought to be in the area near the Øvre Vådal farms near the present-day border with Steinkjer Municipality. Much of the agricultural area lies in the disturbed area. The highest point in the municipality was the 442-metre (1,450 ft) tall mountain Marsteinsvola, a tripoint border with Røra Municipality, Sparbu Municipality, and Verdal Municipality.

The coastal settlement at Hylla, which had steamship connections, was the original centre of the area, but when the railway arrived in 1905 a new centre grew up around the station that took over most of the functions.

== Economy ==
Traditionally, agriculture was the most important industry in the area, but Røra has two important industrial of major importance. The limestone quarry at Hylla has been an important place of employment in the municipality. In addition Røra Fabrikker, owned by the Coop NKL, the Norwegian retailers' co-operative association produces an assortment of jams, juices, and other processed agricultural products are made in the factory. The company currently employs about 59 people.

== Government ==
While it existed, Røra Municipality was responsible for primary education (through 10th grade), outpatient health services, senior citizen services, welfare and other social services, zoning, economic development, and municipal roads and utilities. The municipality was governed by a municipal council of directly elected representatives. The mayor was indirectly elected by a vote of the municipal council. The municipality was under the jurisdiction of the Frostating Court of Appeal.

=== Municipal council ===
The municipal council (Herredsstyre) of Røra Municipality was made up of 13 representatives that were elected to four year terms. The tables below show the historical composition of the council by political party.

Røra heradsstyre 1959–1961
Party name (in Nynorsk)	Number of representatives
Labour Party (Arbeidarpartiet)	6
Centre Party (Senterpartiet)	4
Liberal Party (Venstre)	3
Total number of members:	13
Note: On 1 January 1962, Røra Municipality became part of Inderøy Municipality.

Røra heradsstyre 1955–1959
Party name (in Nynorsk)	Number of representatives
Labour Party (Arbeidarpartiet)	8
Farmers' Party (Bondepartiet)	3
Liberal Party (Venstre)	2
Total number of members:	13

Røra heradsstyre 1951–1955
Party name (in Nynorsk)	Number of representatives
Labour Party (Arbeidarpartiet)	7
Joint List(s) of Non-Socialist Parties (Borgarlege Felleslister)	5
Total number of members:	12

Røra heradsstyre 1947–1951
Party name (in Nynorsk)	Number of representatives
Labour Party (Arbeidarpartiet)	7
Joint List(s) of Non-Socialist Parties (Borgarlege Felleslister)	5
Total number of members:	12

Røra heradsstyre 1945–1947
Party name (in Nynorsk)	Number of representatives
Labour Party (Arbeidarpartiet)	6
Farmers' Party (Bondepartiet)	3
Liberal Party (Venstre)	3
Total number of members:	12

Røra heradsstyre 1937–1941*
Party name (in Nynorsk)	Number of representatives
Labour Party (Arbeidarpartiet)	6
Farmers' Party (Bondepartiet)	4
Liberal Party (Venstre)	2
Total number of members:	12
Note: Due to the German occupation of Norway during World War II, no elections were held for new municipal councils until after the war ended in 1945.

=== Mayors ===
The mayor (Nynorsk: ordførar) of Røra Municipality was the political leader of the municipality and the chairperson of the municipal council. Here is a list of people who held this position:

- 1907–1916: Sivert Austad (V)
- 1917–1934: Johan Koa (V)
- 1935–1941: Anders Austad (Bp)
- 1941–1942: Marius Lunnan (V)
- 1942–1944: Knut Forseth (NS)
- 1944–1945: Ivar Ertzgaard (NS)
- 1945–1945: Arthur Løe
- 1945–1947: Anders Austad (Bp)
- 1948–1955: John Følstad (Ap)
- 1956–1959: Kåre Sjøvold (Ap)
- 1960–1961: Jens Austad (Sp)

== See also ==
- List of former municipalities of Norway
