= Sandvollan Municipality =

Former municipality in Trøndelag, Norway

Sandvollan Municipality Sandvollan herad
- Former municipality
- Hustad herad (historic name)
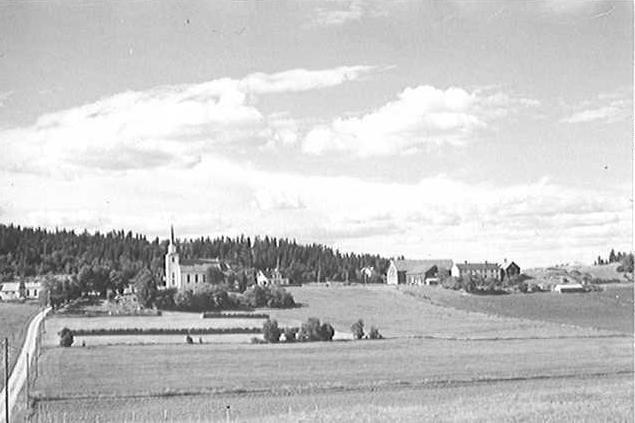
- View of the Heggstad Church and surrounding area (c. 1936)

- Nord-Trøndelag within Norway

- Sandvollan within Nord-Trøndelag
- Coordinates: 63°56′47″N 11°19′42″E
- Country: Norway
- County: Nord-Trøndelag
- District: Innherred
- Established: 1 Jan 1907
  - Preceded by: Inderøy Municipality
- Disestablished: 1 Jan 1962
  - Succeeded by: Inderøy Municipality
- Administrative centre: Sandvollan

Government
  - Mayor (1960–1961): Andreas Nygård (Ap)

Area (upon dissolution)
  - Total: 27.7 km^{2} (10.7 sq mi)
  - Rank: #651 in Norway
- Highest elevation: 144 m (472 ft)

Population (1961)
  - Total: 757
  - Rank: #684 in Norway
  - Density: 27.3/km^{2} (71/sq mi)
  - Change (10 years): ▼ −7.1%

Official language
  - Norwegian form: Nynorsk
- Time zone: UTC+01:00 (CET)
  - Summer (DST): UTC+02:00 (CEST)
- ISO 3166 code: NO-1728

Sandvollan is a former municipality in the old Nord-Trøndelag county, Norway. The 28-square-kilometre (11 sq mi) municipality existed from 1907 until its dissolution in 1962. It was located in the north part of what is now Inderøy Municipality in Trøndelag county. The administrative centre of the municipality was located at Sandvollan, where Hustad Church was located (just southeast of Gangstad. There are two main villages in Sandvollan: Gangstad and Småland. Gangstad has a grocery store. Between the two villages lies Skjelvågen, a harbour that used to be a stop on the steam ship routes.

Prior to its dissolution in 1962, the 28-square-kilometre (11 sq mi) municipality was the 651st largest by area out of the 731 municipalities in Norway. Sandvollan Municipality was the 684th most populous municipality in Norway with a population of about 757. The municipality's population density was 27.3 inhabitants per square kilometre (71/sq mi) and its population had decreased by 7.1% over the previous 10-year period.

There were two churches in Sandvollan Municipality: the 12th-century Hustad Church and Heggstad Church from 1887. The older church was built for the chieftain of Hustad, Bård Standale, who was sheriff for Eystein Haraldsson around 1150. The newer church was built because the old one had become too small.

== General information ==
The municipality of Hustad was established on 1 January 1907 when the old Inderøy Municipality was divided into three: Røra Municipality (population: 866) in the southeast, Hustad Municipality (population: 732) in the north, and Inderøy Municipality (population: 2,976) in the west. In 1912, the name was changed to Sandvollan Municipality. During the 1960s, there were many municipal mergers across Norway due to the work of the Schei Committee. On 1 January 1962, Røra Municipality (population: 1,003), Sandvollan Municipality (population: 750), and Inderøy Municipality (population: 3,194) were merged to form a new, larger Inderøy Municipality.

=== Name ===
The municipality was originally named Hustad, after the old Hustad farm (Old Norse: Hússtaðir) since the first Hustad Church was built there. The first element is hús which means "house". The last element is the nominative case of staðr which means "place" or "abode". On 16 October 1911, a royal resolution changed the name of the municipality to Sandvollan. The new name was actually an old name for the area (Old Norse: Sandvǫllr). The first element comes from the word sandr which means "sandy ground" or "sandbank". The last element is vǫllr which means "field" or "meadow".

=== Attractions ===
Norway's first ever approved farm dairy located is located at Gangstad is open to public, serving home made ice cream and selling the 2023 worlds best cheese.

=== Culture ===
Quite a number of local activities are oriented around culture, including the annual festival "Skjelvvågendåggån". There is also a gallery, Stuberg Ueno, other small artist workshops. The deer farm Gjørv hold art exhibitions on historic lands, where people have been living for over 3000 years, as well as hosting weddings. At Hustad church there is a memorial site for the first englishman to lose his life during world war 2. The Sandvollan Bingo is well visited by people from around Innherred, and the surplus funds most of the development initiatives locally.

The Church of Norway had one parish (sokn) within Sandvollan Municipality. At the time of the municipal dissolution, it was part of the Inderøy prestegjeld and the Nord-Innherad prosti (deanery) in the Diocese of Nidaros.

Churches in Sandvollan Municipality
| Parish (sokn) | Church name | Location of the church | Year built |
|---|---|---|---|
| Sandvollan | Heggstad Church | Heggstad, near Gangstadhaugen | 1887 |
| Sandvollan | Hustad Church | Gangstad | c. 1150 |

== Geography ==
Sandvollan is located on the northern part of the Inderøya peninsula. Bordered by Sparbu Municipality and the Børgin fjord to the east, Inderøy Municipality to the southwest, and the Trondheimsfjord to the north. Sandvollan Municipality was mostly an agricultural area, though it also functions as a suburb of the nearby town of Steinkjer, located about 10 kilometres (6.2 mi) away. The highest point in the municipality was the 144-metre (472 ft) tall mountain Nosa, on the border with Inderøy Municipality to the south.

== Government ==
Sandvollan is responsible for primary education (through 7th grade), outpatient health services, senior citizen services, welfare and other social services, zoning, economic development, and municipal roads and utilities. The municipality was governed by a municipal council of directly elected representatives. The mayor was indirectly elected by a vote of the municipal council. The municipality was under the jurisdiction of the Frostating Court of Appeal.

=== Municipal council ===
The municipal council (Herredsstyre) of Sandvollan Municipality was made up of 13 representatives that were elected to four year terms. The tables below show the historical composition of the council by political party.

Sandvollan heradsstyre 1959–1961
| Party name (in Nynorsk) | Number of representatives |
|---|---|
| Labour Party (Arbeidarpartiet) | 8 |
| Centre Party (Senterpartiet) | 4 |
| Liberal Party (Venstre) | 1 |
| Total number of members: | 13 |
Note: On 1 January 1962, Sandvollan Municipality became part of Inderøy Municipality.

Sandvollan heradsstyre 1955–1959
| Party name (in Nynorsk) | Number of representatives |
|---|---|
| Labour Party (Arbeidarpartiet) | 9 |
| Farmers' Party (Bondepartiet) | 3 |
| Liberal Party (Venstre) | 1 |
| Total number of members: | 13 |

Sandvollan heradsstyre 1951–1955
| Party name (in Nynorsk) | Number of representatives |
|---|---|
| Labour Party (Arbeidarpartiet) | 8 |
| Farmers' Party (Bondepartiet) | 3 |
| Liberal Party (Venstre) | 1 |
| Total number of members: | 12 |

Sandvollan heradsstyre 1947–1951
| Party name (in Nynorsk) | Number of representatives |
|---|---|
| Labour Party (Arbeidarpartiet) | 7 |
| Joint List(s) of Non-Socialist Parties (Borgarlege Felleslister) | 5 |
| Total number of members: | 12 |

Sandvollan heradsstyre 1945–1947
| Party name (in Nynorsk) | Number of representatives |
|---|---|
| Labour Party (Arbeidarpartiet) | 7 |
| Joint List(s) of Non-Socialist Parties (Borgarlege Felleslister) | 5 |
| Total number of members: | 12 |

Sandvollan heradsstyre 1937–1941*
| Party name (in Nynorsk) | Number of representatives |
|---|---|
| Labour Party (Arbeidarpartiet) | 6 |
| Joint list of the Farmers' Party (Bondepartiet) and the Liberal Party (Venstre) | 6 |
| Total number of members: | 12 |
Note: Due to the German occupation of Norway during World War II, no elections were held for new municipal councils until after the war ended in 1945.

=== Mayors ===
The mayor (Nynorsk: ordførar) of Sandvollan Municipality was the political leader of the municipality and the chairperson of the municipal council. Here is a list of people who held this position:

- 1907–1919: Tørris Hustad (V)
- 1920–1922: Kristian Sletvold (V)
- 1923–1925: Ole Stornes (Bp)
- 1926–1928: Petter Heggstad (Bp)
- 1929–1931: Ole Stornes (Bp)
- 1932–1934: Sivert Bragstad (Bp)
- 1935–1937: Ole Stornes (Bp)
- 1938–1941: Lars Overrein (Bp)
- 1941–1945: Petter Heggstad (NS)
- 1945–1945: Lars Overrein (Bp)
- 1946–1957: Oluf B. Meistad (Ap)
- 1958–1959: Håkon A. Hustad (Ap)
- 1960–1961: Andreas Nygård (Ap)

== See also ==
- List of former municipalities of Norway
