= Røra Station =

Railway station in Inderøy, Norway

Røra Station Røra stasjon
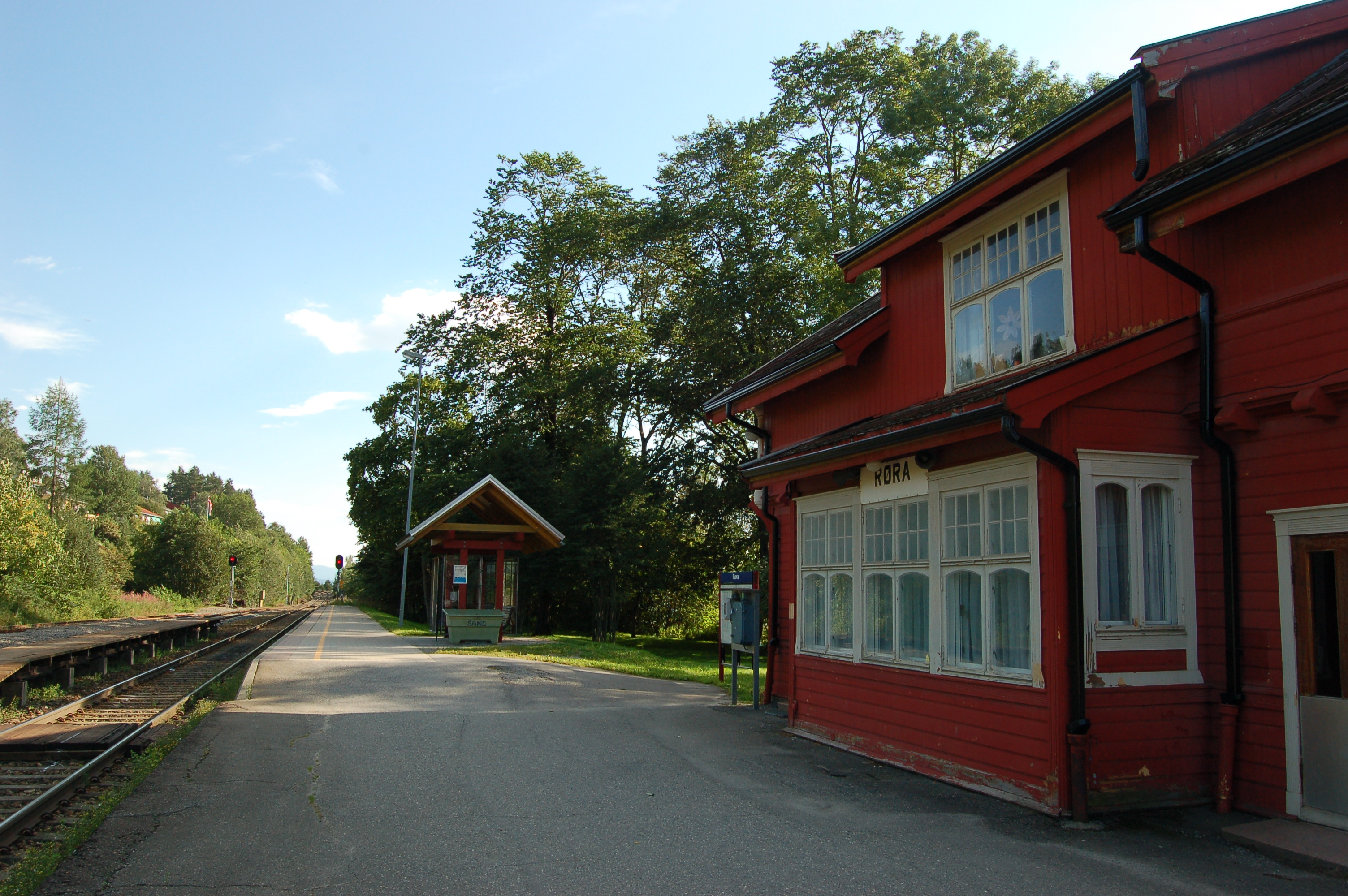
- View of the station

General information
- Location: Røra, Inderøy Municipality; Trøndelag; Norway
- Coordinates: 63.857512°N 11.401619°E
- Elevation: 51.5 metres (169 ft) above sea level
- System: Railway station
- Owner: Bane NOR
- Operator: SJ Norge
- Line: Nordlandsbanen
- Distance: 105.47 kilometres (65.54 mi)
- Platforms: 2

History
- Opened: 1905
Location
- Location within Trøndelag Location within Norway

Røra Station (Norwegian: Røra stasjon) is a railway station located in the village of Røra in Inderøy Municipality in Trøndelag county, Norway. The station is located along the Nordlandsbanen railway line. It serves the entire municipality of Inderøy, though there is no corresponding bus service. The station is only served by the Trøndelag Commuter Rail service that goes between Steinkjer and Trondheim.

== History ==
The station was built as part of the Hell–Sunnan Line. It opened on 15 November 1905 along with the rest of the line north of Verdal. Originally the station was named Salberg, but it was renamed Røra on 1 August 1918. The station cost 51,130 kr. As one of only two stations on the Hell–Sunnanbanen line, it was not custom designed, but is a standard design. In 1977, the signaling system was automated and remote controlled. The station has been completely unstaffed since 2003.

At the time of construction the only settlement at Røra was located at Hylla, along the coast. But the site chosen for its location near the Salberg Church. Since then, the Hellemshaugen housing development, a grocery store, a school, and other public facilities have been built near the station, making it a very urban area.

| Preceding station | | Following station |
|---|---|---|
| Verdal | Nordland Line | Sparbu |
| Preceding station | Local trains | Following station |
| Verdal | Trøndelag Commuter Rail | Sparbu |
