= Røra =

Village in Inderøy Municipality, Norway

- Village
- Interactive map of Røra
- Location within Trøndelag Location within Norway
- Coordinates: 63.8587°N 11.4006°E
- Country: Norway
- Region: Central Norway
- County: Trøndelag
- District: Innherred
- Municipality: Inderøy Municipality

Area
  - Total: 0.64 km^{2} (0.25 sq mi)
- Elevation: 51 m (167 ft)

Population (2024)
  - Total: 475
  - Density: 742/km^{2} (1,920/sq mi)
- Time zone: UTC+01:00 (CET)
  - Summer (DST): UTC+02:00 (CEST)
- Post Code: 7670

Røra is a village in Inderøy Municipality in Trøndelag county, Norway. The village is located on a small peninsula between the Trondheimsfjorden and the Børgin fjord. The village is located about 7 kilometres (4.3 mi) north of the town of Verdalsøra and about 20 kilometres (12 mi) south of the town of Steinkjer. The village of Hylla lies just south of Røra and the municipal centre of Straumen lies a short distance to the west.

The European route E6 highway and the Nordlandsbanen railway line both run through the village, with the train stopping at Røra Station. Norwegian County Road 755 begins in Røra and continues on toward Leksvik to the south. The historic Salberg Church is located in the village.

The 0.64-square-kilometre (160-acre) village has a population (2024) of 475 and a population density of 742 inhabitants per square kilometre (1,920/sq mi).

== History ==
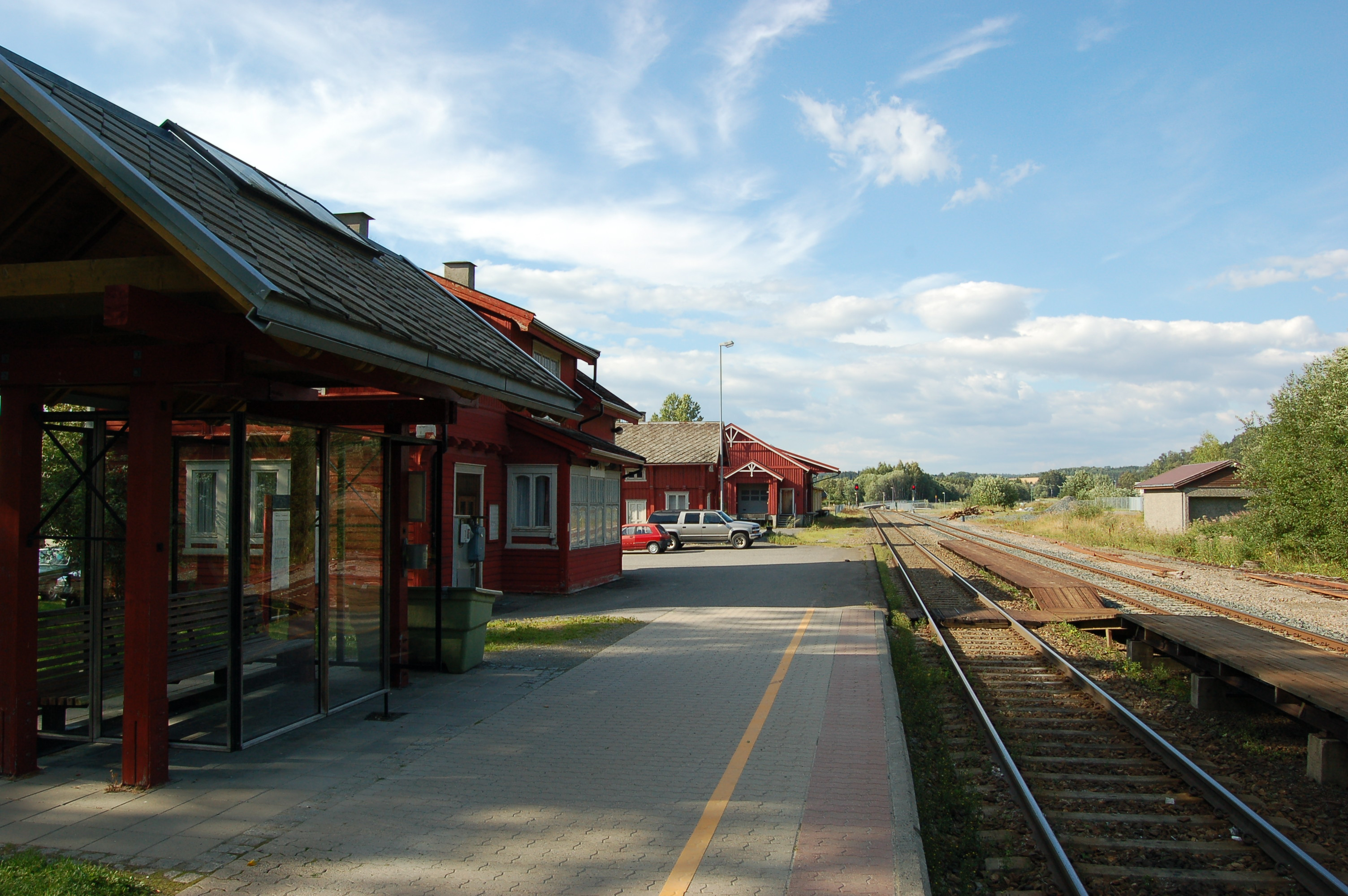
Røra Station

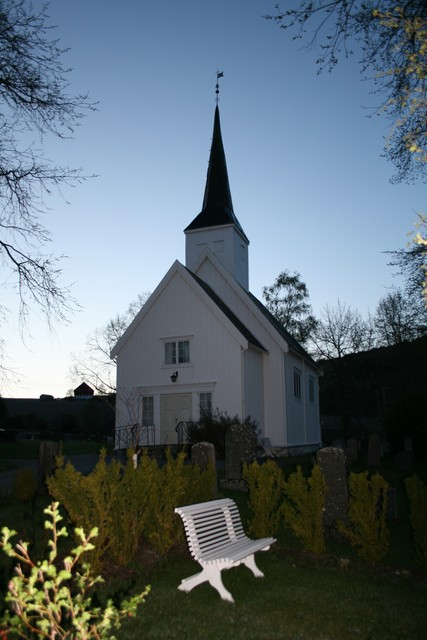
Salberg Church, just south of Røra

Røra lies between Stiklestad and Mære, and is in an area of rich historical monuments. An early highway, The King's Road (Norwegian: kongevei), was at a higher elevation than the current highway. Along this route there are several minor finds from earlier habitation. On the boundary between Nedre Vådal and Røflo remains have been found from a very old habitation, probably from the Iron Age. Defense works indicate that the habitation must have been over a long period and been substantial.

The entire landscape has been changed after a major landslide in the 14th century. Most of the disturbed mass slid into Hylla fjord, but some was diverted to Børgin fjord. The source of the slide is thought to be in the area near the Øvre Vådal farms near the border with Steinkjer Municipality. Much of the agricultural area lies in the disturbed area.

The coastal settlement at Hylla which had steamship connections was the original centre of the area, but when the railway arrived in 1905 a new centre grew up around the station that took over most of the functions.

From 1907-1962, this village was the administrative centre of the old Røra Municipality.

== Economy ==
Traditionally, agriculture has been the most important industry in the area, but Røra has two important industrial of major importance. Hylla limestone quarry is a short distance to the southwest of Røra and has been an important place of employment in the area. In addition Røra Fabrikker, owned by the Coop NKL, the Norwegian retailers' co-operative association produces an assortment of jams, juices, and other processed agricultural products are made in the factory. The company currently employs about 59 people.
