= Heggstad Church =

Church in Trøndelag, Norway

- Heggstad kirke
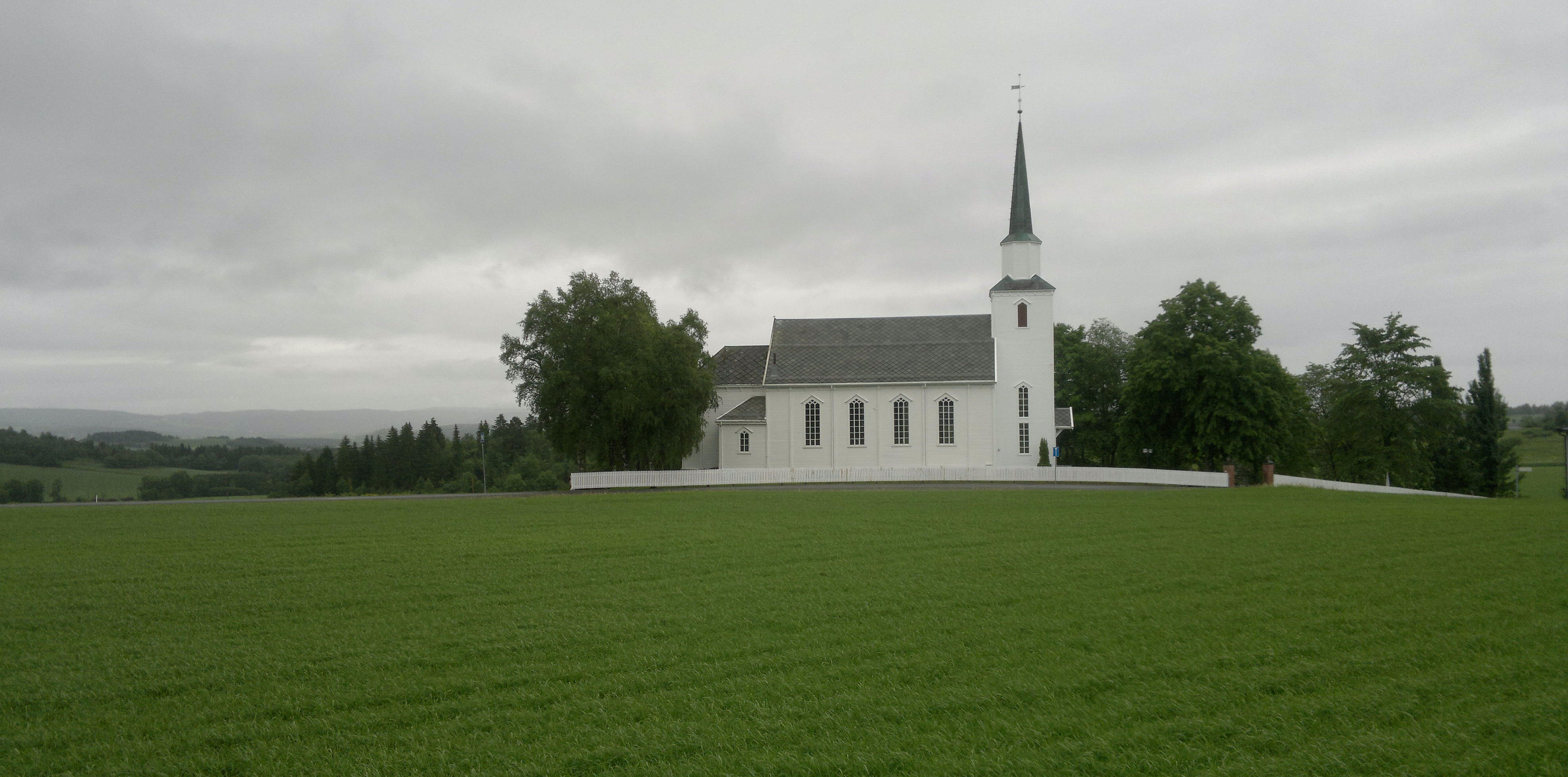
- View of the church
- Heggstad Church
- 63.94667881°N 11.32743135°E
- Location: Inderøy Municipality, Trøndelag
- Country: Norway
- Denomination: Church of Norway
- Churchmanship: Evangelical Lutheran

History
- Status: Parish church
- Founded: 1887
- Consecrated: 21 Aug 1887

Architecture
- Functional status: Active
- Architect: Håkon Mosling
- Architectural type: Long church
- Completed: 1887 (139 years ago)

Specifications
- Capacity: 250
- Materials: Wood

Administration
- Diocese: Nidaros bispedømme
- Deanery: Stiklestad prosti
- Parish: Sandvollan
- Norwegian Cultural Heritage Site
- Type: Church
- Status: Listed
- ID: 85395

Heggstad Church (Norwegian: Heggstad kirke) is a parish church of the Church of Norway in Inderøy Municipality in Trøndelag county, Norway. It is located at Sandvollan, just south of the village of Gangstadhaugen. It is the main church for the Sandvollan parish which is part of the Stiklestad prosti (deanery) in the Diocese of Nidaros. The white, wooden church was built in a long church style in 1887 using plans drawn up by the architect Håkon Mosling. The church seats about 250 people. The church was built to replace the centuries-old Hustad Church located nearby.

== History ==
The centuries-old Hustad Church was in need of being replaced because it was too small for the parish, but instead of tearing it down, it was decided to build a new church nearby and turn the old church into a museum. Håkon Mosling was hired as the architect in 1874 and his design and plans were completed by 1876. It wasn't until 1885 that the government gave formal approval and funding to build the new church. The new church was built about 2.5 kilometres (1.6 mi) southwest of the old Hustad Church. The new building was consecrated on 31 August 1887. In 1967, there was a fire in the church which caused some damage that needed to be repaired.

== Media gallery ==
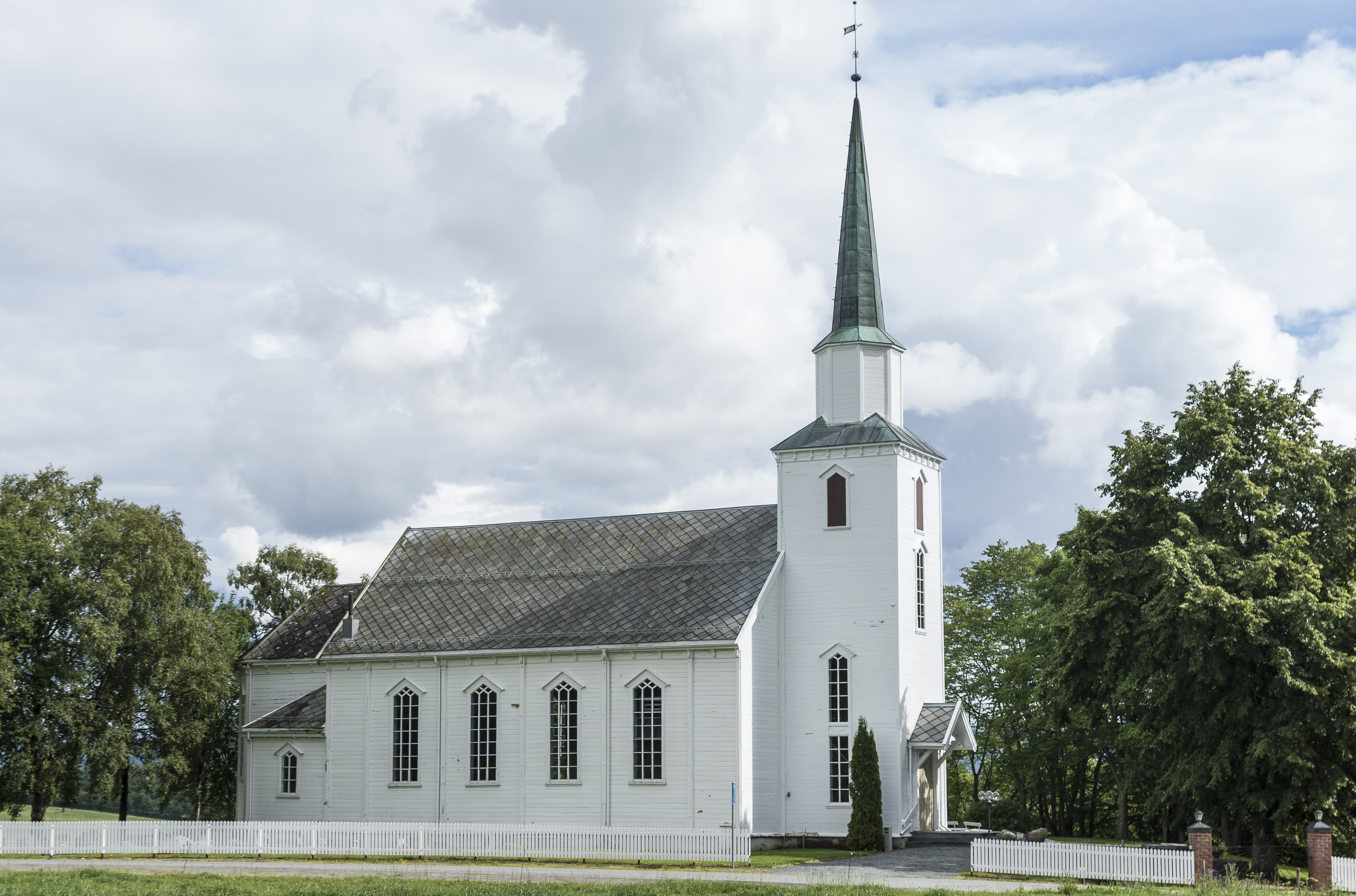

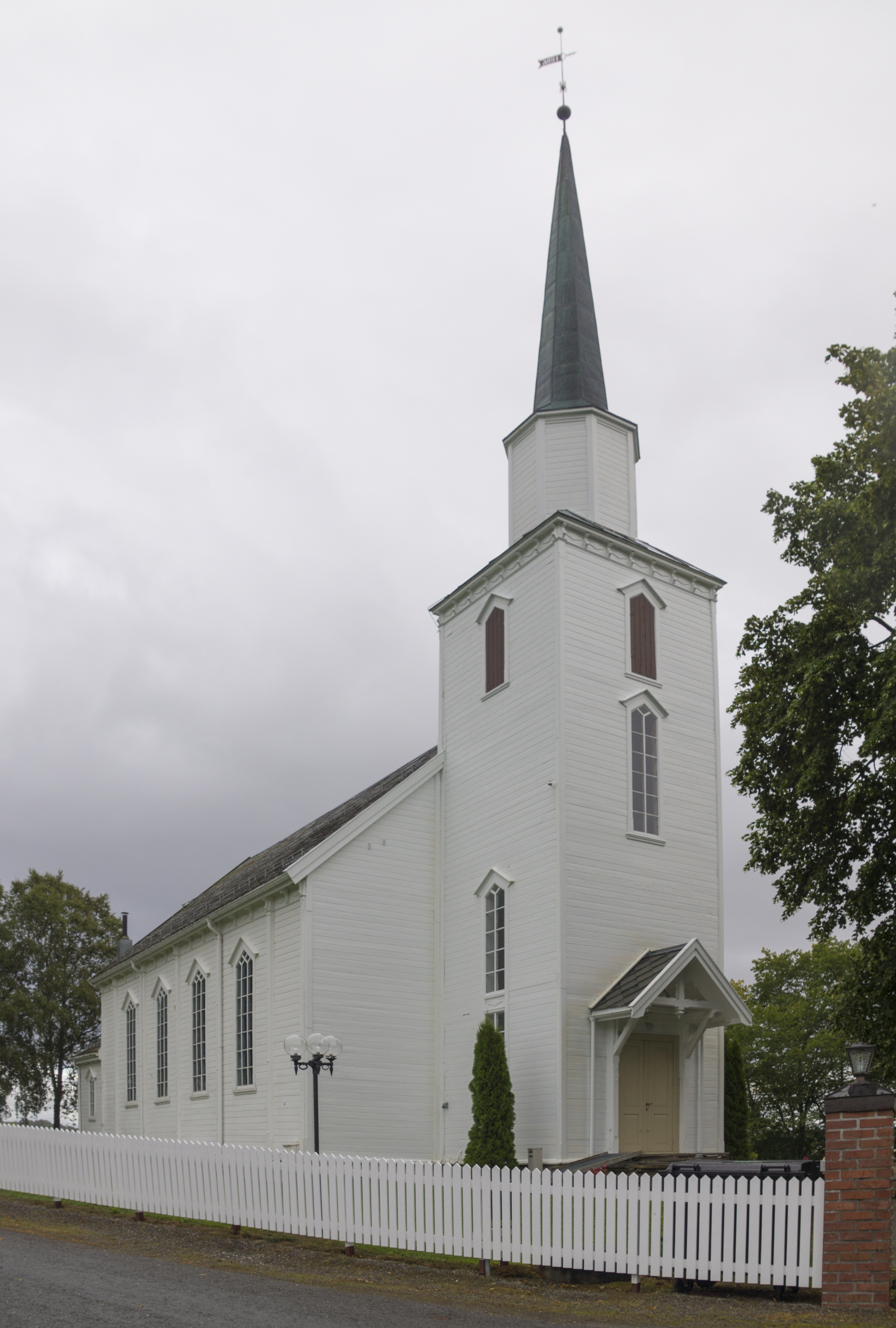

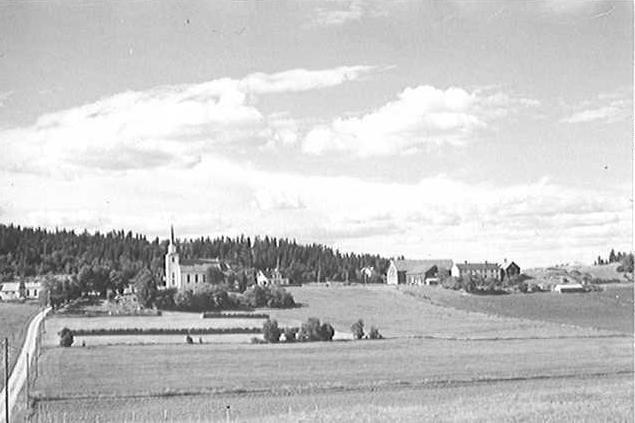

== See also ==
- List of churches in Nidaros
