= Verdal Station =

Railway station in Verdal, Norway

Verdal Station Verdal stasjon
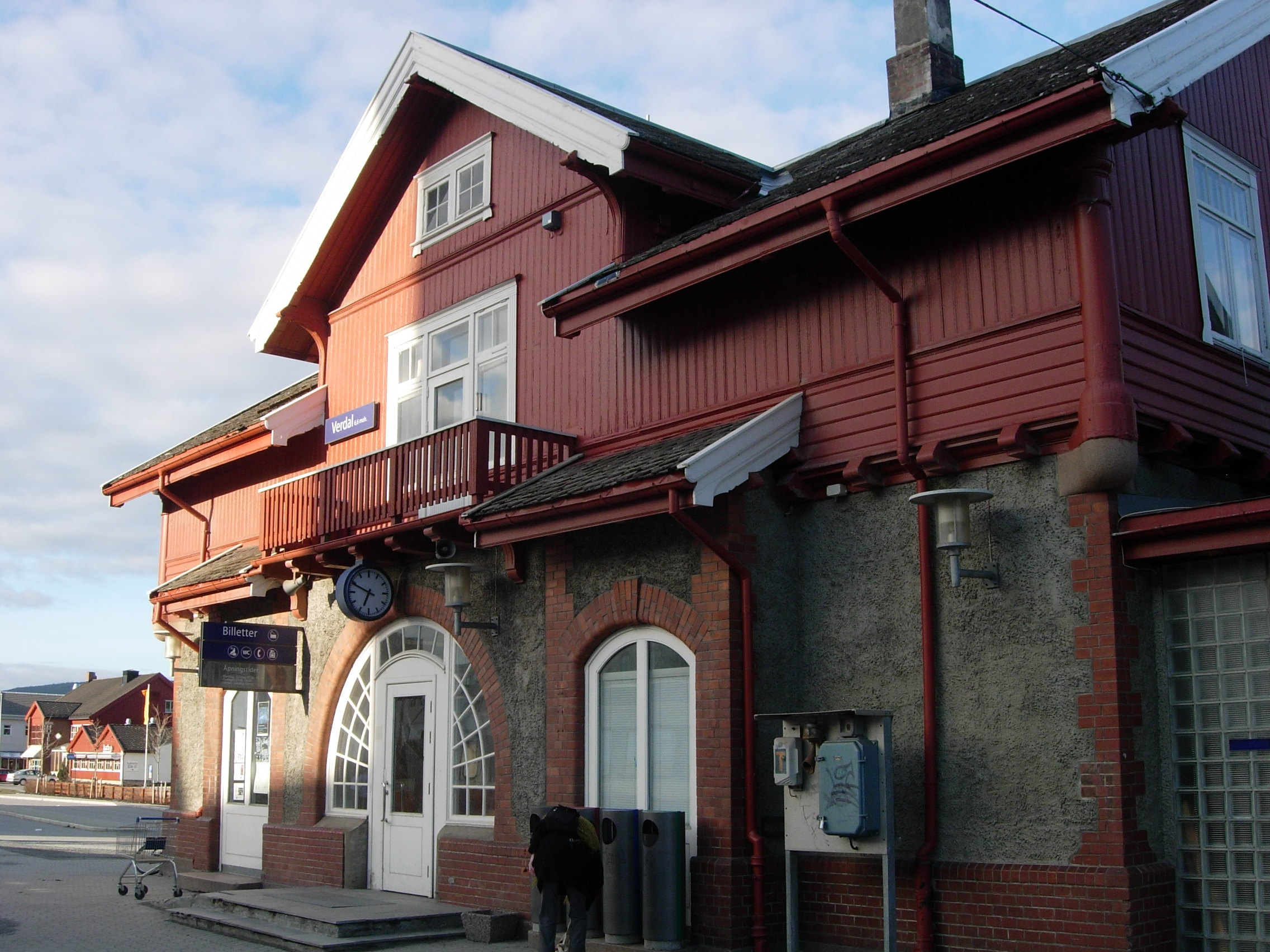
- View of the station

General information
- Location: Verdalsøra, Verdal Municipality; Trøndelag; Norway
- Coordinates: 63.79073°N 11.48470°E
- Elevation: 6.6 metres (22 ft) above sea level
- System: Railway station
- Owner: Bane NOR
- Operator: SJ Norge
- Line: Nordlandsbanen
- Distance: 96.23 kilometres (59.79 mi)
- Platforms: 2
- Connections: Bus: AtB

Construction
- Architect: Paul Armin Due

History
- Opened: 1 November 1904
Location
- Location within Trøndelag Location within Norway

Verdal Station (Norwegian: Verdal stasjon) is a railway station located in the town of Verdalsøra in Verdal Municipality in Trøndelag county, Norway.

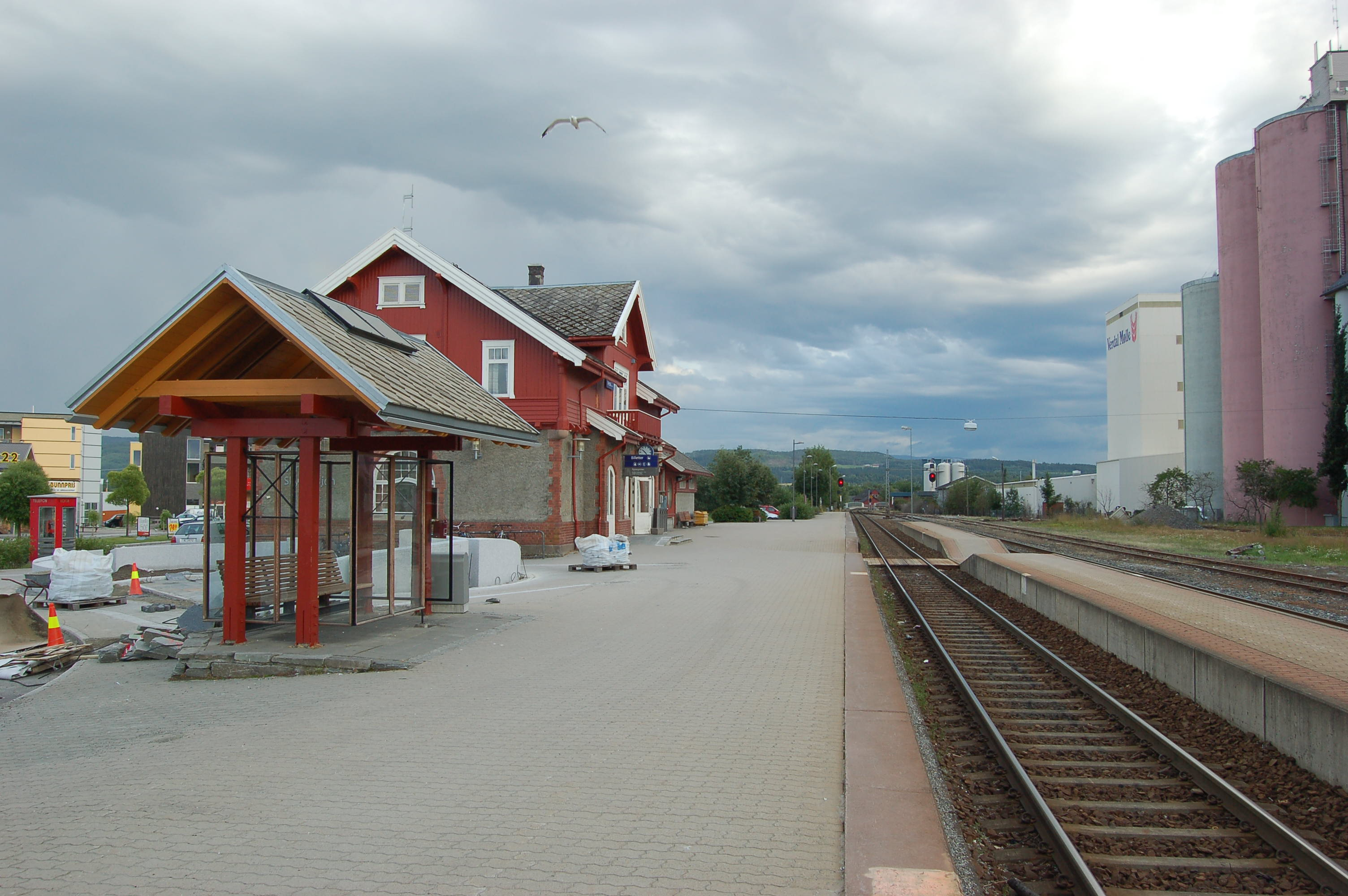
Verdal station

== History ==
The station was opened on 1 November 1904 on the Hell–Sunnan Line as the section to Verdal was finished. It was built based upon designs by Paul Armin Due. It was named Værdalen until 1 June 1919 when it was changed to its present name.

The station is located along the Nordland Line and it serves the entire municipality of Verdal except the Vinne area which is served by Bergsgrav Station. The station is served by the Trøndelag Commuter Rail service between Steinkjer and Trondheim and also by regional trains to Bodø and Trondheim.

Preceding station		Following station
Bergsgrav	Nordland Line	Røra
Preceding station	Local trains	Following station
Bergsgrav	Trøndelag Commuter Rail	Røra
