= Småland, Inderøy =

Village in Inderøy Municipality, Norway

Småland Breivika / Breidvik
- Village
- Interactive map of Småland
- Location within Trøndelag Location within Norway
- Coordinates: 63.9631°N 11.3104°E
- Country: Norway
- Region: Central Norway
- County: Trøndelag
- District: Innherred
- Municipality: Inderøy Municipality

Area
  - Total: 0.2 km^{2} (0.077 sq mi)
- Elevation: 15 m (49 ft)

Population (2024)
  - Total: 261
  - Density: 1,305/km^{2} (3,380/sq mi)
- Time zone: UTC+01:00 (CET)
  - Summer (DST): UTC+02:00 (CEST)
- Post Code: 7670 Inderøy

Småland is a village in Sandvollan - Inderøy Municipality in Trøndelag county, Norway. It is located along the Trondheimsfjord in the northern part of the Inderøya peninsula, about 1.5 kilometres (0.93 mi) northwest of the village of Gangstadhaugen. Boat harbour, cafe and music stage at Skjelvvågen and beach at Stornesøra.

The 0.2-square-kilometre (49-acre) village has a population (2024) of 261 and a population density of 1,305 inhabitants per square kilometre (3,380/sq mi).
