= Hustad Church =

Church in Trøndelag, Norway

- Hustad kirke
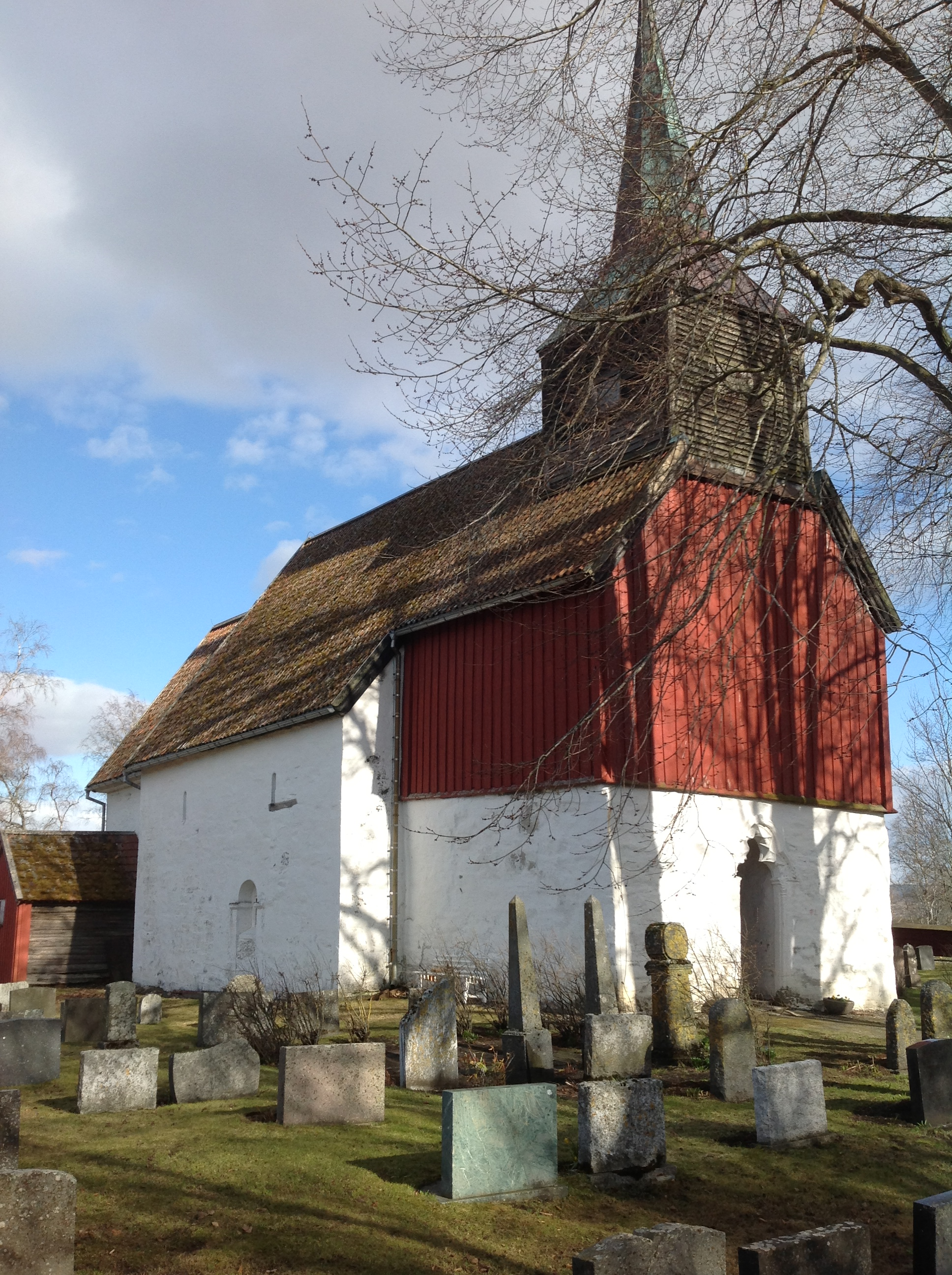
- View of the church
- Hustad Church
- 63.96684994°N 11.34816831°E
- Location: Inderøy Municipality, Trøndelag
- Country: Norway
- Denomination: Church of Norway
- Previous denomination: Catholic Church
- Churchmanship: Evangelical Lutheran

History
- Status: Parish church
- Founded: c. 1160
- Consecrated: c. 1160

Architecture
- Functional status: Preserved
- Architectural type: Long church
- Style: Romanesque
- Completed: c. 1160 (866 years ago)

Specifications
- Materials: Stone

Administration
- Diocese: Nidaros bispedømme
- Deanery: Stiklestad prosti
- Parish: Sandvollan
- Norwegian Cultural Heritage Site
- Type: Church
- Status: Automatically protected
- ID: 84672

Hustad Church (Norwegian: Hustad kirke) is a preserved former parish church of the Church of Norway in Inderøy Municipality in Trøndelag county, Norway. It is located just north of the village of Gangstadhaugen. It is the former main church for the Sandvollan parish which is part of the Stiklestad prosti (deanery) in the Diocese of Nidaros. The white Romanesque, stone church was built in a long church style around the year 1150. The church seats about 150 people. In 1887, the new Heggstad Church replaced this church. At that time, this church was closed and sold to the Society for the Preservation of Ancient Norwegian Monuments (Fortidsminneforeningen) to be maintained as a museum. The church is no longer regularly used, but it is used for special occasions.

== History ==
The earliest existing historical records of the church date back to the year 1533, but the church was not new that year. The church was likely constructed around the year 1160. It is one of the few remaining stone churches from the Middle Ages in Norway. Hustad Church was built of quarry stone. The masonry is almost completely preserved. The church has an entry porch on the west end with a tower above it. There is a rectangular nave and a narrower, rectangular chancel. Dendrochronological datings from the church show that the trees used to build the roof structure of the nave was cut down in the years 1162–1163. Based on masonry technique and stylistic features at the portals, it can be concluded that the church was started in the first half of the 12th century and completed around 1163. The two portals to the north and south are arched in Romanesque style. After it was completed, the tower on the west end was constructed, completing that work around the year 1180. Some unique aspects of this small church include the pews which are original, and the cemetery which is surrounded by a log joined fence, the only such preserved fence in the traditional region of Trøndelag.

In 1650, the tower was replaced and rebuilt on top of the stone base that is the main entrance to the building. Also that year, a wooden sacristy was constructed on the north side of the building. Much of the interior baroque-style furniture was added to the building during the renovations of 1650. The current altarpiece is from 1702 and it has the image of the Crucifixion of Jesus. On the pulpit is the painted carvings of the Evangelists.

The church, like most other Norwegian churches, was sold at the Norwegian church auction in the 1720s so that the King could pay debts from the Great Northern War. The last private owner sold the church to the people of the parish in 1838. The church was renovated and the interior painted in bright colors soon after that. An increase in the population and the Church Act of 1851, which required that church buildings have room to hold 30% of the people living in the parish, meant that the church was too small. In 1885, permission was granted to build a new church nearby (Heggstad Church). After the new church was put into use, the old church was closed and sold to the Society for the Preservation of Ancient Norwegian Monuments (Fortidsminneforeningen) who maintains the building and runs it as a museum.

== Gallery ==
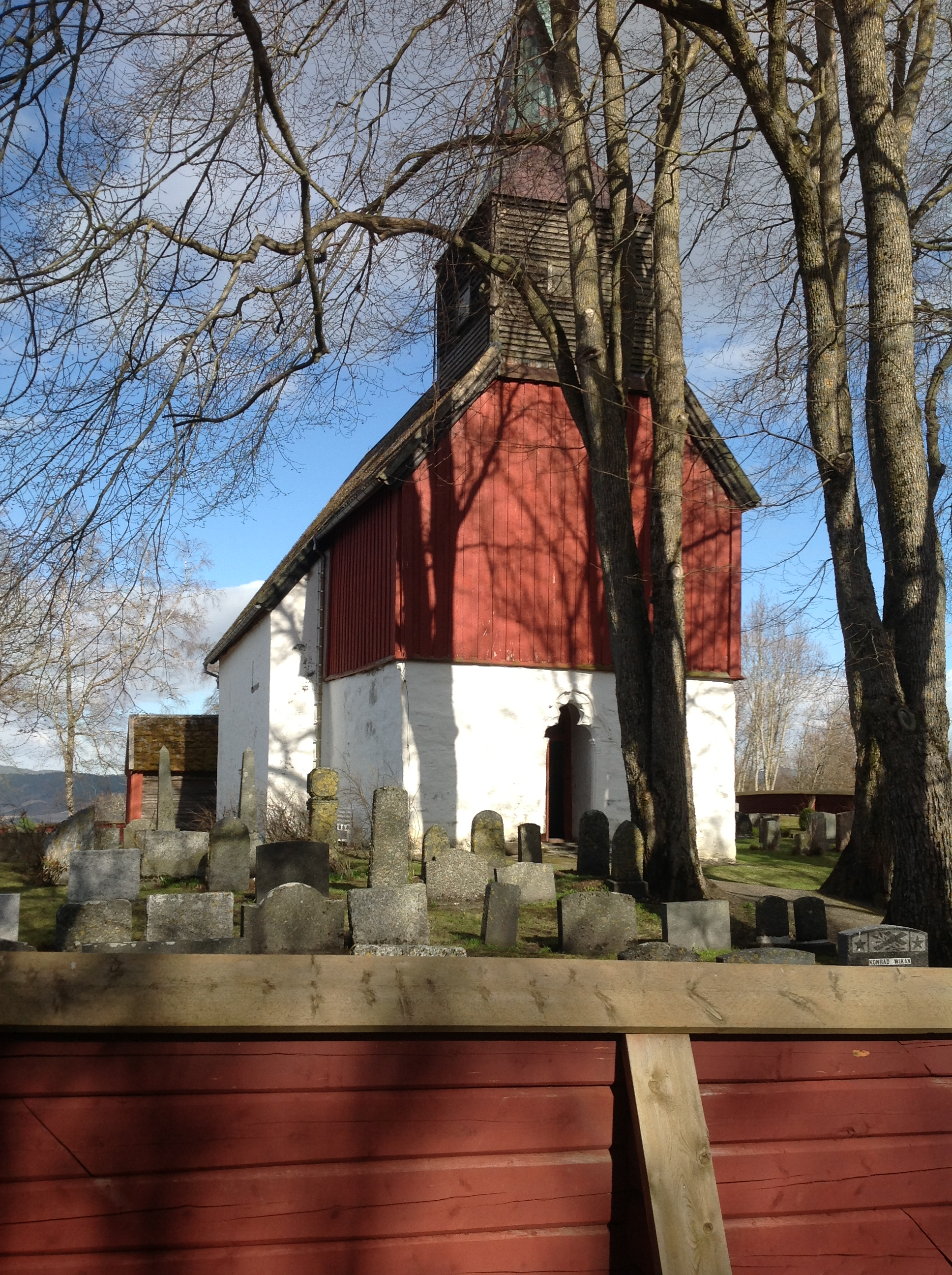
Exterior view

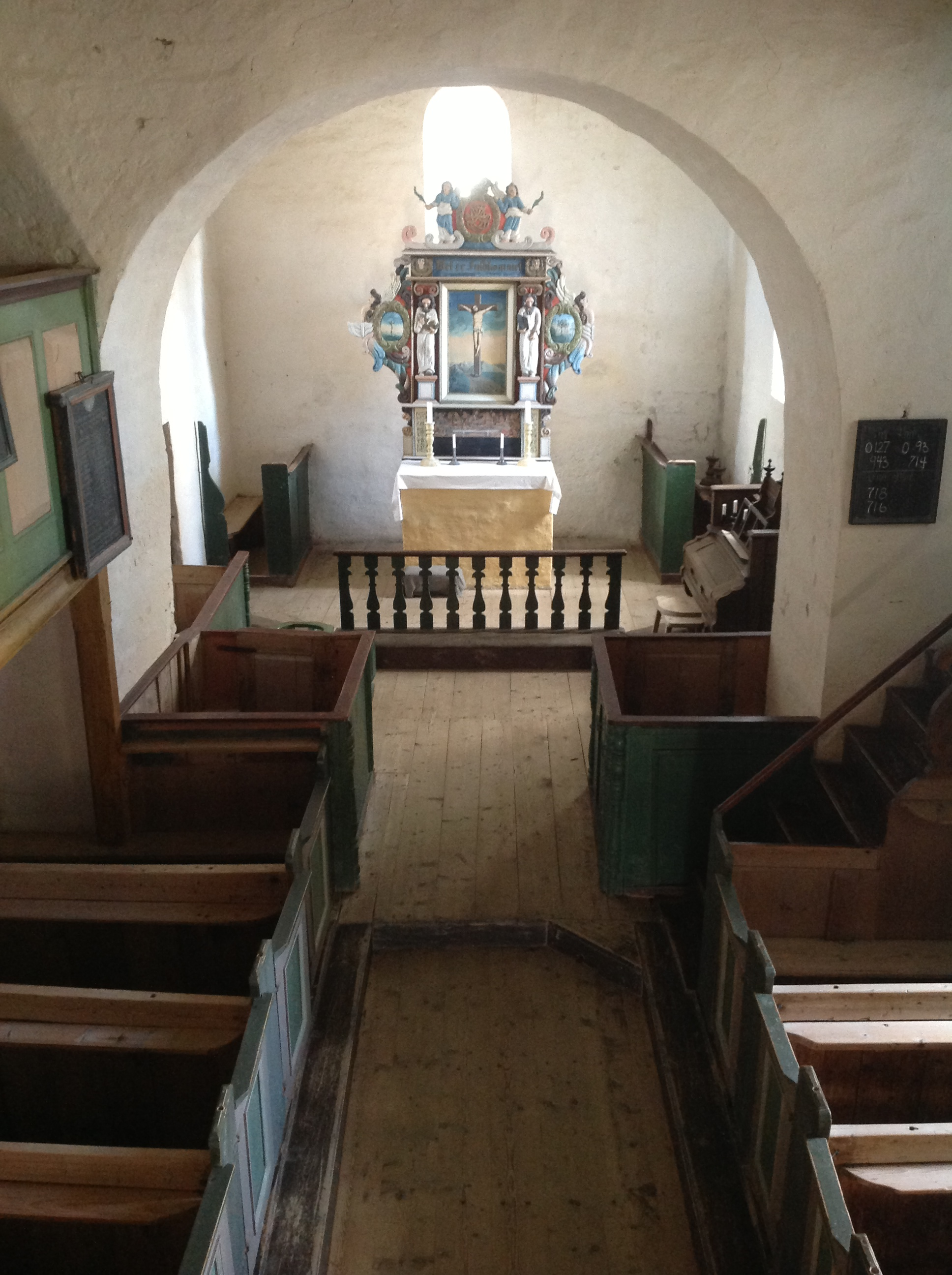
Nave and choir

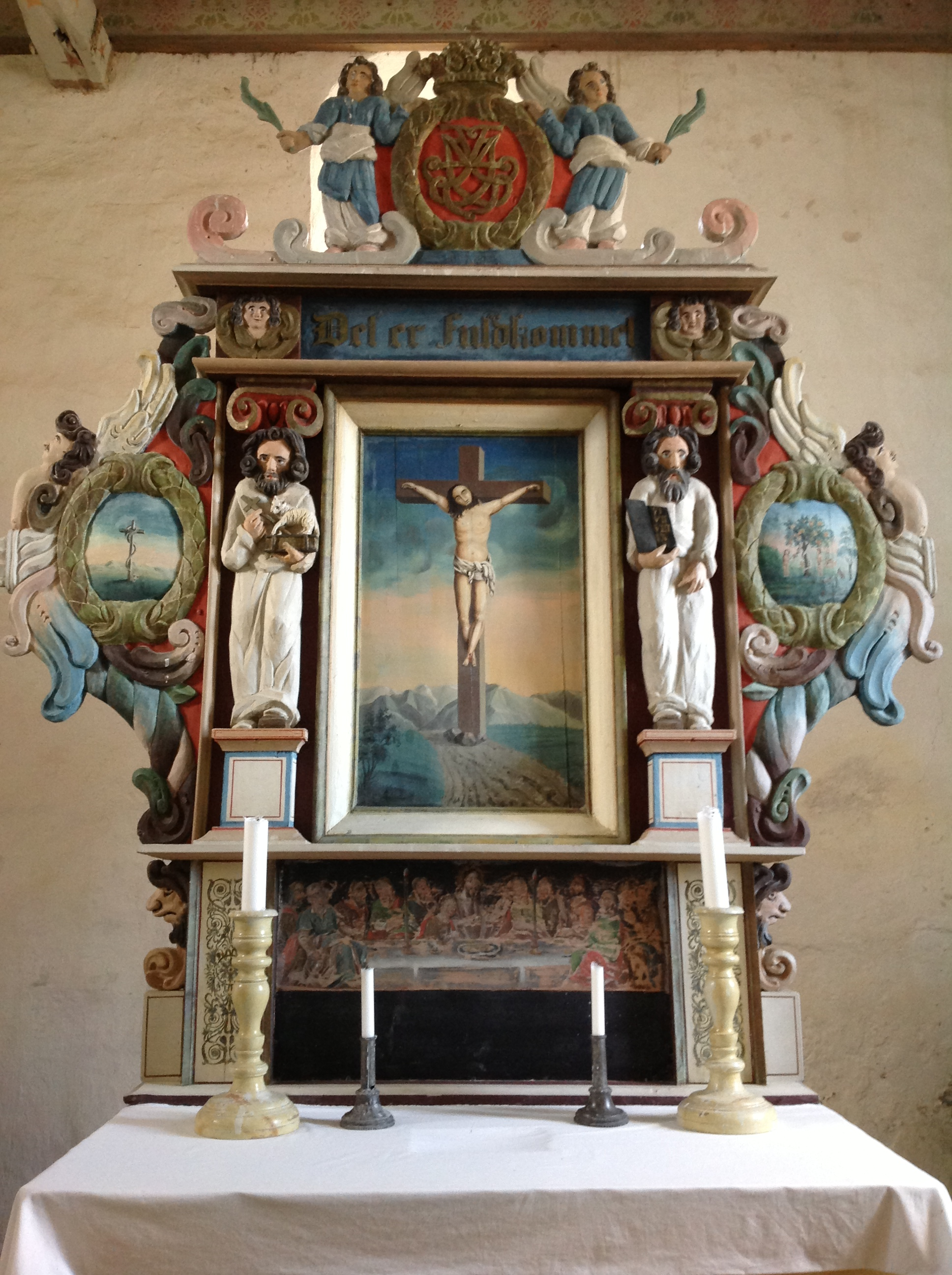
Altar

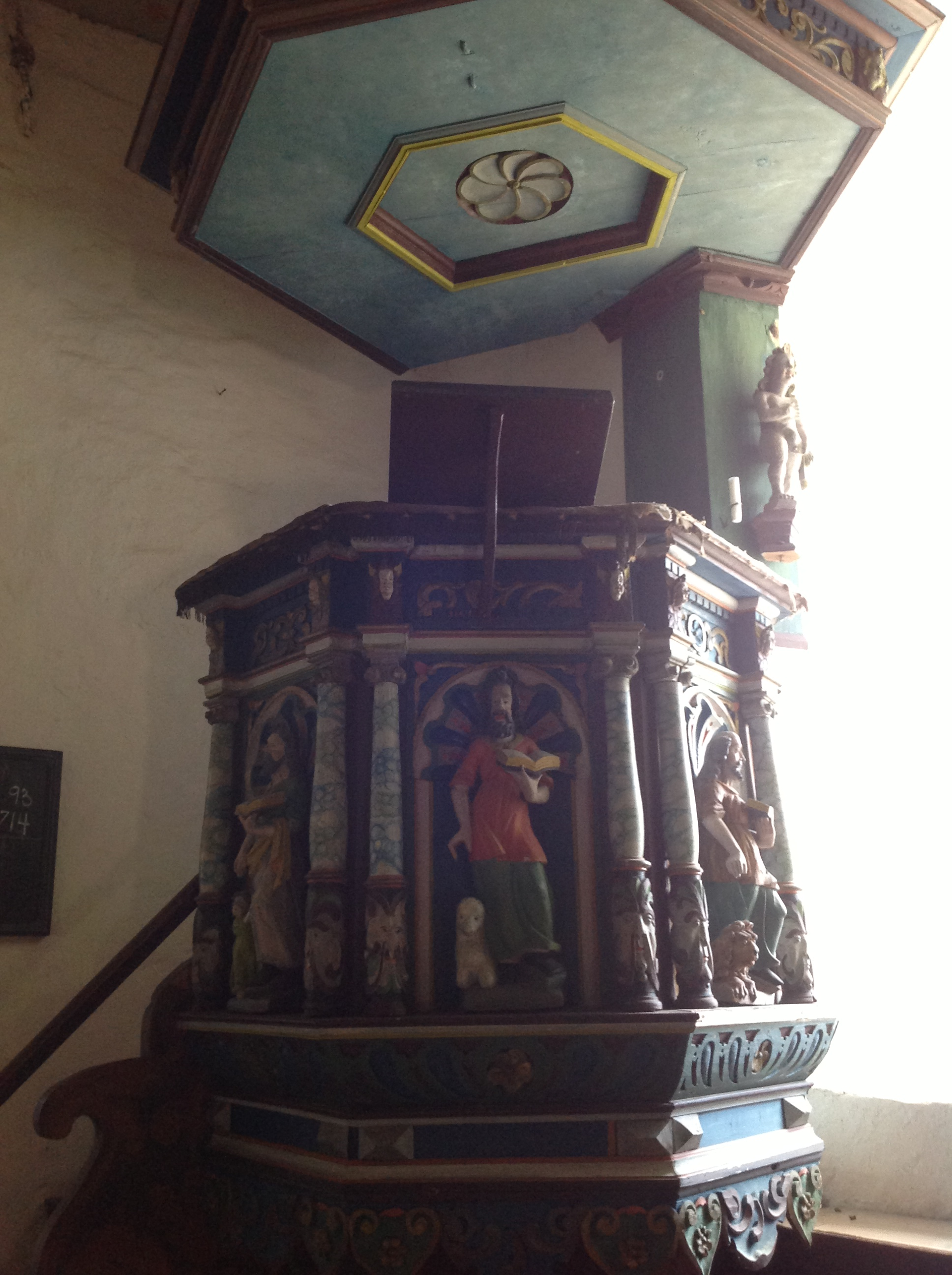
Pulpit

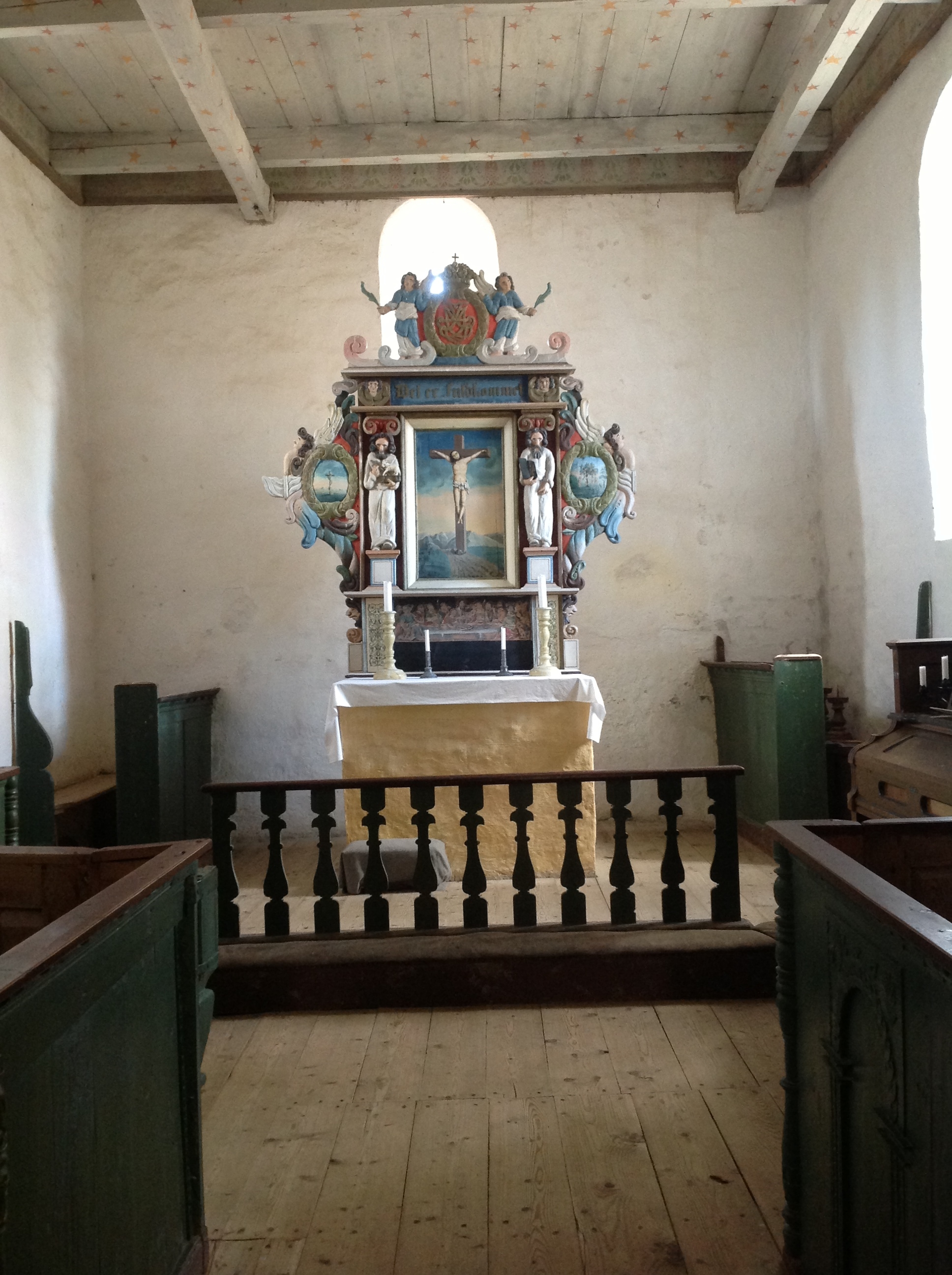
Choir

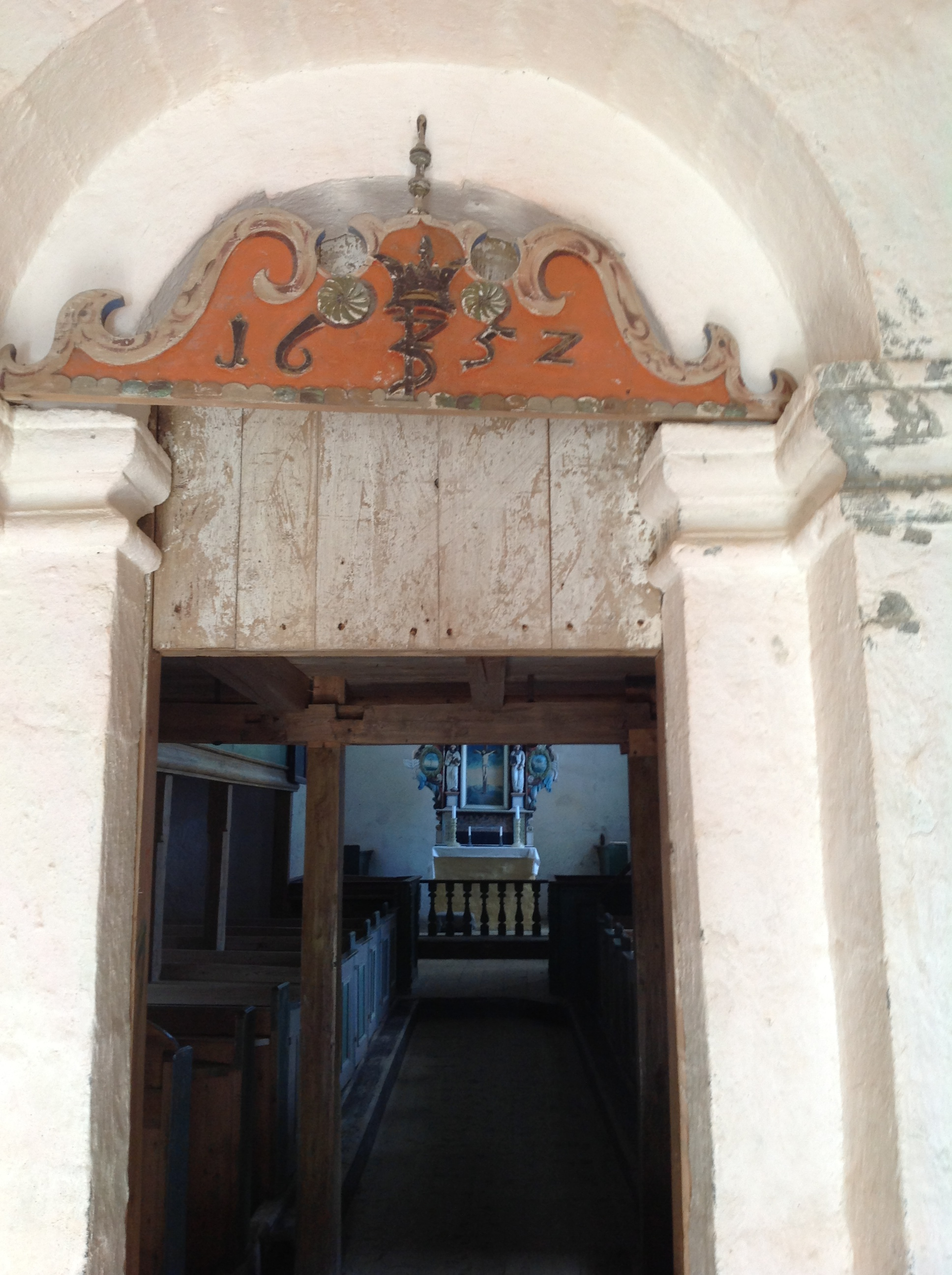
Main entrance

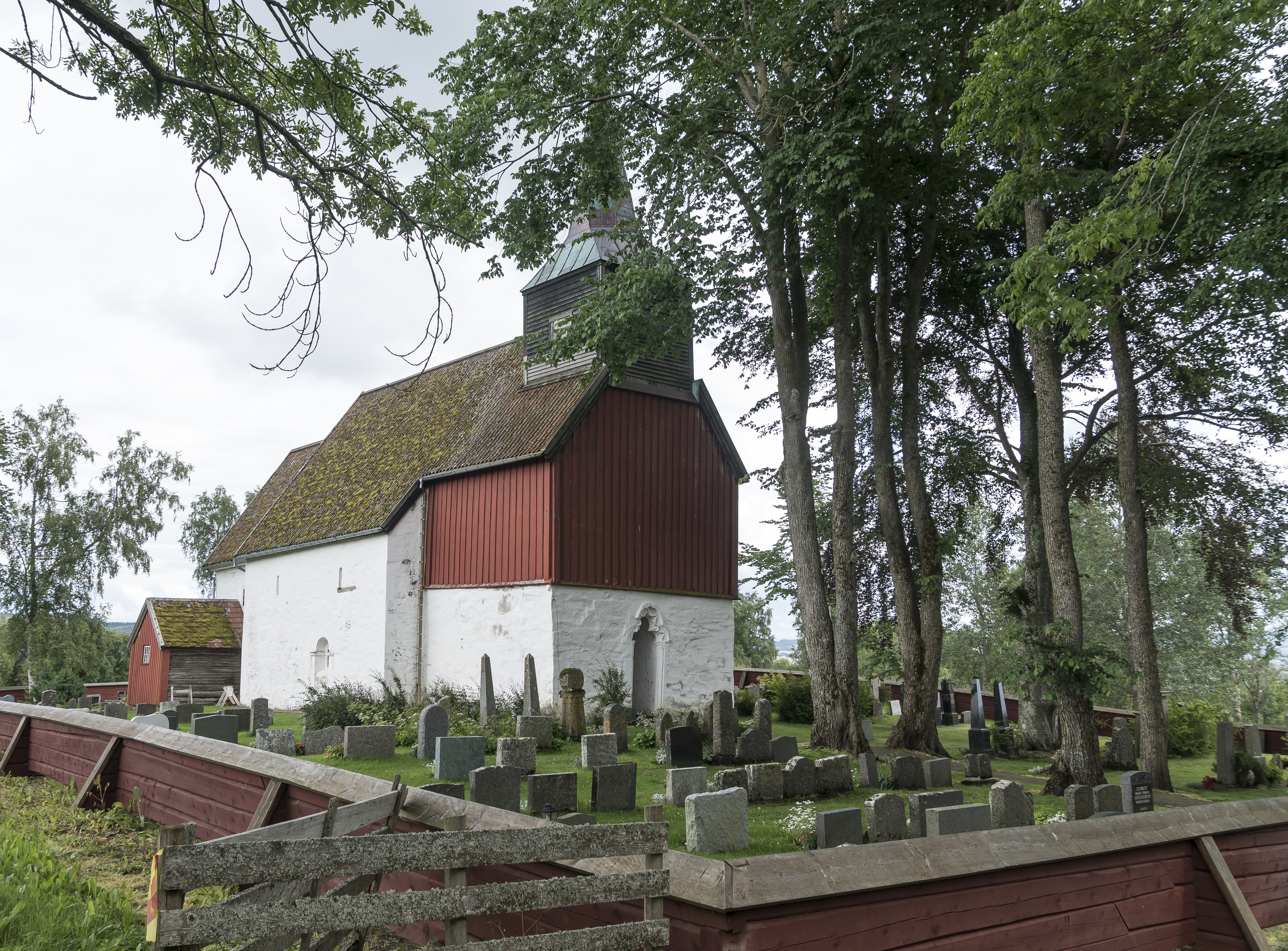
Churchyard and cemetery

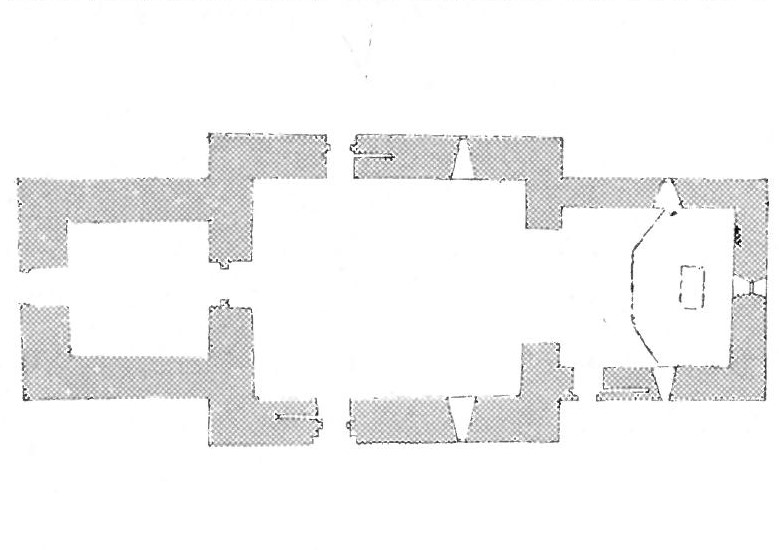
Layout

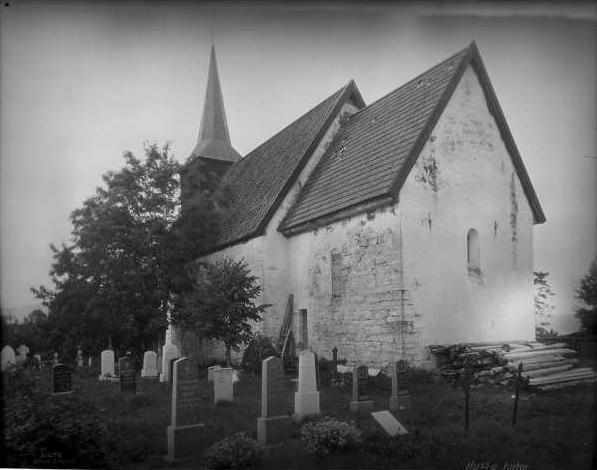
Exterior view (1927)

== See also ==
- List of churches in Nidaros
