= Gangstadhaugen =

Village in Inderøy Municipality, Norway

Gangstadhaugen Gangstad
- Village
- Interactive map of Gangstadhaugen
- Location within Trøndelag Location within Norway
- Coordinates: 63.9582°N 11.3323°E
- Country: Norway
- Region: Central Norway
- County: Trøndelag
- District: Innherred
- Municipality: Inderøy Municipality

Area
  - Total: 0.14 km^{2} (0.054 sq mi)
- Elevation: 33 m (108 ft)

Population (2024)
  - Total: 228
  - Density: 1,629/km^{2} (4,220/sq mi)
- Time zone: UTC+01:00 (CET)
  - Summer (DST): UTC+02:00 (CEST)
- Post Code: 7670 Inderøy

Gangstadhaugen or Gangstad is a village in Sandvollan - Inderøy Municipality in Trøndelag county, Norway. It is located on the northern part of the Inderøya peninsula, near the shore of the Beitstadfjorden, about 1.5 kilometres (0.93 mi) southeast of the village of Småland. Most famous for the local cheese factory Gangstad Gårdsysteri. Hustad Church is located about 1 kilometre (0.62 mi) north of the village.

The 0.14-square-kilometre (35-acre) village has a population (2024) of 228 and a population density of 1,629 inhabitants per square kilometre (4,220/sq mi).
