= Salberg Church =

Church in Trøndelag, Norway

- Salberg kirke
- Røra kirke
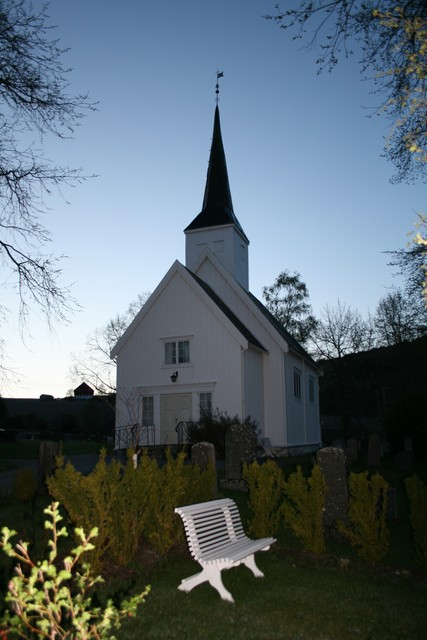
- View of the church
- Salberg Church
- 63.850382324°N 11.40789521°E
- Location: Inderøy Municipality, Trøndelag
- Country: Norway
- Denomination: Church of Norway
- Churchmanship: Evangelical Lutheran

History
- Status: Parish church
- Founded: 13th century
- Consecrated: 1715

Architecture
- Functional status: Active
- Architectural type: Long church
- Completed: 1715 (311 years ago)

Specifications
- Capacity: 130
- Materials: Wood

Administration
- Diocese: Nidaros bispedømme
- Deanery: Stiklestad prosti
- Parish: Røra
- Norwegian Cultural Heritage Site
- Type: Church
- Status: Automatically protected
- ID: 85360

Salberg Church (Norwegian: Salberg kirke) is a parish church of the Church of Norway in Inderøy Municipality in Trøndelag county, Norway. It is located in the village of Røra, between the Nordland Line and European route E6 highway. It is the church for the Røra parish which is part of the Stiklestad prosti (deanery) in the Diocese of Nidaros. The small, white, wooden church was built in a long church style in 1715 using plans drawn up by an unknown architect. The church seats about 130 people.

== History ==
The earliest existing historical records of the church date back to the year 1432, but the church was not new that year. The first church on the site was a stave church that may have been constructed in the 13th century. Around the year 1644, the old church was expanded. A new nave was built on the west side of the existing building. The old nave was converted into a choir and the old choir was turned into a sacristy. An inspection in the year 1700 describes the church as old and dilapidated as well as small. The roof was also found to be rotting. So, the parish began planning for a replacement building. In 1712, the old church was torn down and construction work began on a new church on the same site. The new long church was consecrated in 1715.

== See also ==
- List of churches in Nidaros
