= Hylla =

Village in Inderøy Municipality, Norway

- Village
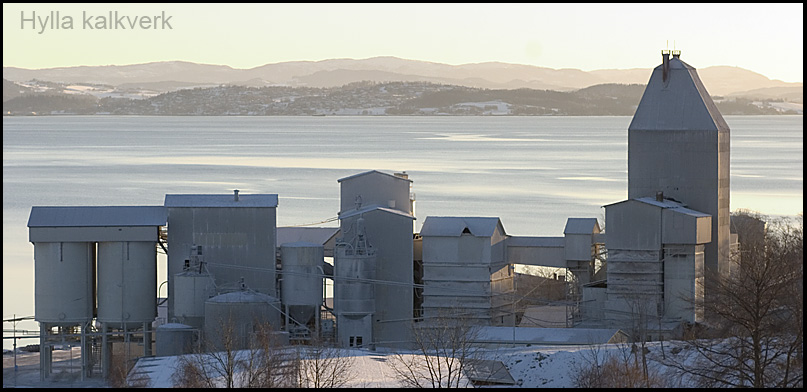
- View of the Hylla limestone factory
- Interactive map of Hylla
- Location within Trøndelag Location within Norway
- Coordinates: 63.8414°N 11.3874°E
- Country: Norway
- Region: Central Norway
- County: Trøndelag
- District: Innherred
- Municipality: Inderøy Municipality

Area
  - Total: 0.29 km^{2} (0.11 sq mi)
- Elevation: 18 m (59 ft)

Population (2024)
  - Total: 356
  - Density: 1,228/km^{2} (3,180/sq mi)
- Time zone: UTC+01:00 (CET)
  - Summer (DST): UTC+02:00 (CEST)
- Post Code: 7670 Inderøy

Hylla is a village in Inderøy Municipality in Trøndelag county, Norway. Hylla is located along the Trondheimsfjord, about 2 kilometres (1.2 mi) south of the village of Røra and about 8 kilometres (5.0 mi) east of the villages of Straumen and Sakshaug. The village is home to a large limestone quarry and processing facility.

The 0.29-square-kilometre (72-acre) village has a population (2024) of 356 and a population density of 1,228 inhabitants per square kilometre (3,180/sq mi).
